= Flying Africans =

African diaspora legend

The flying Africans legend reflects a longing for a reversal of the Middle Passage in the Atlantic slave trade.

Flying Africans are figures of African diaspora legend who escape enslavement by a magical passage back over the ocean. Most noted in Gullah culture, they also occur in wider African-American folklore, and in that of some Afro-Caribbean peoples.

Though it is generally agreed that the legend reflects a longing for a reversal of the Atlantic slave trade, scholars differ on the extent to which this should be seen as supernatural belief or as allegory: of freedom, death, the afterlife, and even metamorphosis or reincarnation. A common Gullah etiology given for this belief is the 1803 mass suicide at Igbo Landing as a form of resistance among newly enslaved people, although versions of the legend also occur across the African diaspora.

== Folklore ==
In a Gullah context, the flying Africans are associated with Hoodoo spirituality, and sometimes perform their ascension through a ritual like a ring shout. Gullah lore also associates flying Africans with a magical iron hoe that works by itself, and a never-empty pot that they leave behind, perhaps relating to the influence of the Yoruba deity Ogun on Hoodoo. Another figure described in Gullah lore as flying on occasion and eventually returning to Africa is the folk hero John the Conqueror.

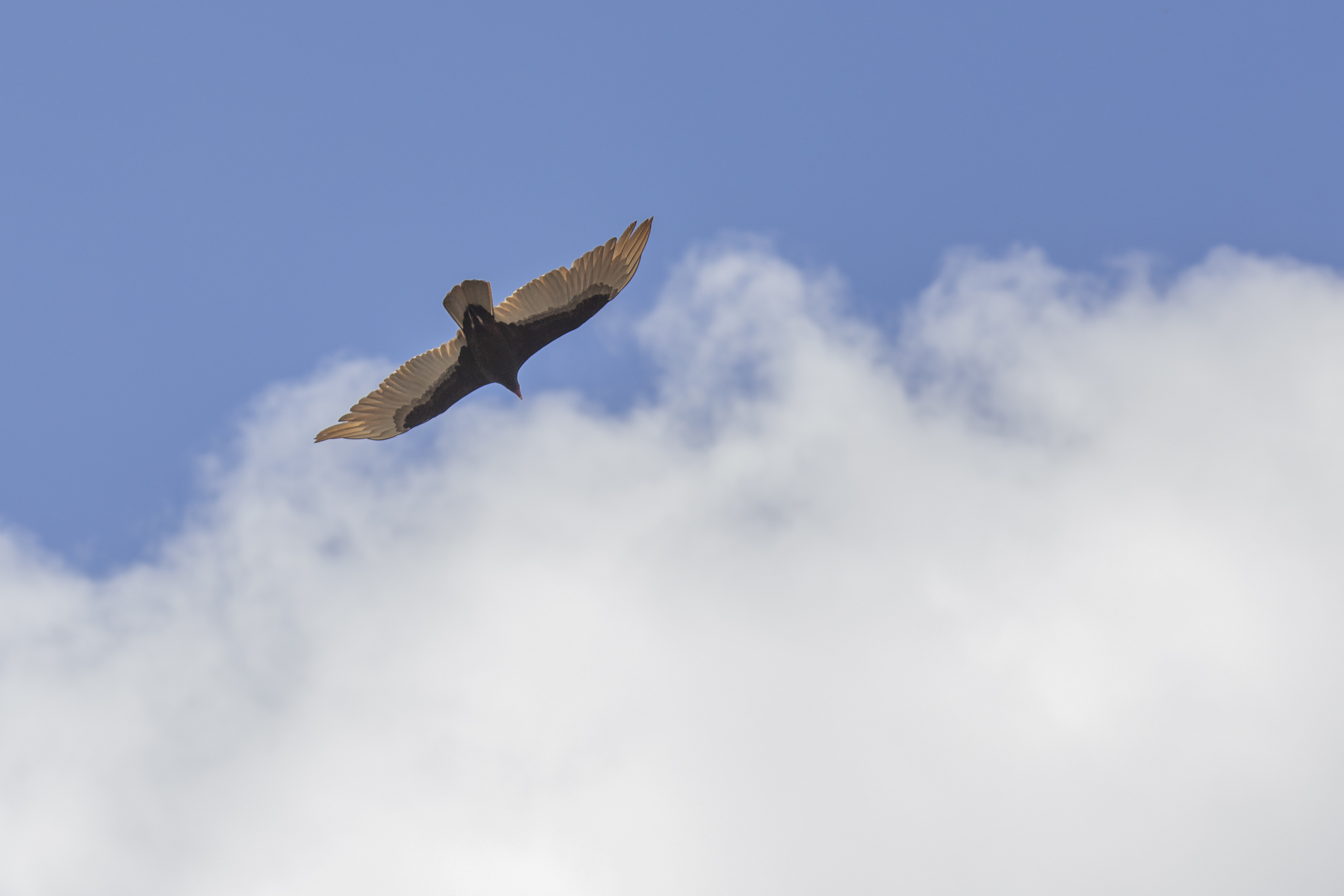
Some versions have the Africans shapeshifting into turkey buzzards.

Sometimes flight is mentioned as a general ability of select ancestors, outside of the specific context of an African return. Flight could be by an individual, by a married couple (who might have to leave behind their children if not African-born), or as a collective act. In some Caribbean versions, salt prevents people from flying, perhaps linked to the soucouyant tradition. The means of flight varied, from levitation, to growing wings, to turning into birds (sometimes buzzards), or in the case of the Igbo Landing drownings, they were allegorized as walking on water to Africa.

The legend has been compared to the flying imagery found in a number of spirituals, and also to the metaphor of a "caged bird". Spirituals in this vein include "Swing Low, Sweet Chariot", "Now Let Me Fly" and "All God's Chillun Got Wings". Harriet Tubman experienced dreams of flying "like a bird" in her youth.

== Legacy ==
The legend appears a number of times in interviews for the Federal Writers' Project Slave Narrative Collection of the 1930s, though given the circumstances these are difficult to interpret; it appears in somewhat greater cultural detail in the slightly later Drums and Shadows. Zora Neale Hurston includes a Jamaican version in her 1938 Tell My Horse, where those who have consumed salt are unable to fly away. John Bennett in 1946 published a story under the title of the spiritual "All God's Chillun Got Wings" as told to him by Caesar Grant. It appears in The Book of Negro Folklore of 1958, edited by Langston Hughes and Arna Bontemps.

Ralph Ellison's short story Flying Home was written in 1967. It is mentioned in Ishamel Reed's 1976 Flight to Canada. Toni Morrison's 1977 novel Song of Solomon references the legend directly, and it is also alluded to in much of her other writing. In interviews, Morrison emphasized the flying Africans as a real folk belief, not a mere metaphor. It also appears in Octavia Butler's 1980 Wild Seed, Paule Marshall's 1983 Praisesong for the Widow and Charles R. Johnson's 1990 Middle Passage.

The legend itself is included as the title story of Virginia Hamilton's 1986 collection The People Could Fly: American Black Folktales, and in the 2004 standalone reissue The People Could Fly: The Picture Book, with enhanced illustrations by Leo and Diane Dillon.

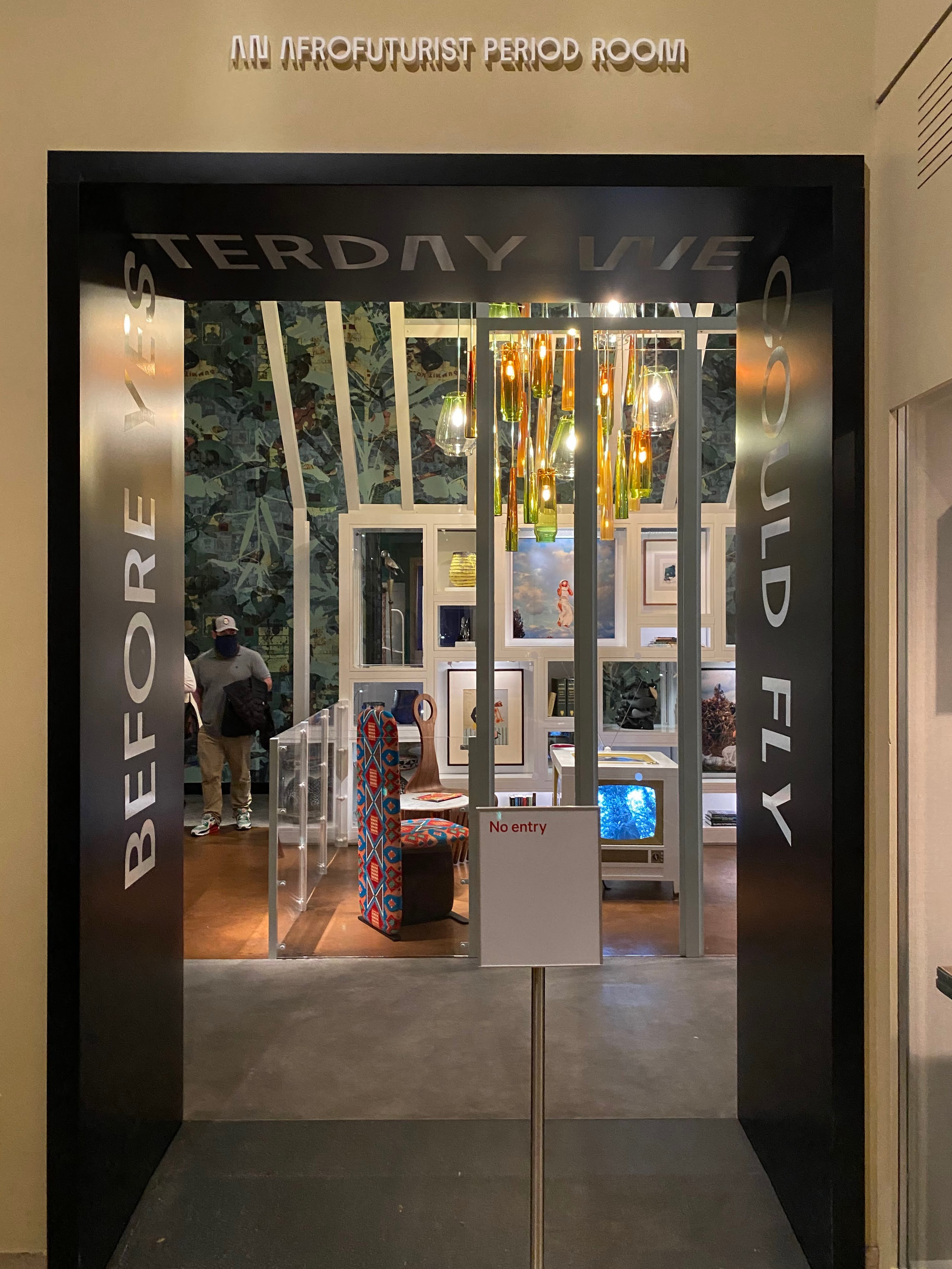
Before Yesterday We Could Fly at the Metropolitan Museum of Art.

Julie Dash's 1991 film Daughters of the Dust quotes from Praisesong for the Widow at Igbo Landing. In Dash's research for the film, she found Igbo Landing had such salience that it was identified by tradition in many local places in the Gullah region. Faith Ringgold utilized elements of the legend in her 1991 illustrated children's book Tar Beach, and in subsequent artworks including the 1996 subway mosaic Flying Home: Harlem Heroes and Heroines at 125th Street station, also inspired by the Lionel Hampton composition "Flying Home". Ngozi Onwurah's 1994 film Welcome II the Terrordome references the appearance in Daughters of the Dust. The legend is the basis for the song "We Could Fly" on Rhiannon Giddens's 2017 album Freedom Highway. Sophia Nahli Allison began her Dreaming Gave Us Wings self portrait series in 2017, including an experimental documentary in The New Yorker. Hamilton's collection also inspired the naming of the 2021 Metropolitan Museum of Art exhibition Before Yesterday We Could Fly.
