= African-American folktales =

Storytelling and oral history

African-American folktales refer to the storytelling and oral history practices of enslaved African Americans from the 1700s through the 1900s and African Americans descendants. Common themes in African-American folktales include tricksters, life lessons, heartwarming tales, and slavery. African Americans created folktales that spoke about the hardships of slavery, telling stories of folk spirits who could outwit their slaveholders and defeat their enemies. These folk stories gave hope to enslaved people, suggesting that folk spirits would liberate them from slavery.

Folktales have also been misused to perpetuate negative stereotypes about the African American community, from minstrel shows to academic journals. One of these figures is High John de Conqueror. He often symbolized empowerment for newly freed slaves, It was said that if they needed him, his spirit resided in a local root. Other common figures in African American folktales include Anansi, Br'er Rabbit, and Uncle Monday. Many folktales are unique to African-American culture, while African, European, and Native American tales influenced others. In the present, the impact of African American folklore is apparent in Hip-hop music, where themes like gangsters and pimps are influenced by the "badman" and "trickster" archetypes.

In some contexts, folklorists employ the terms "culture keepers" or contemporary "griots" to refer to the people who contribute to the preservation of African American folklore through sharing and creation.

== African-American folklore ==
African-American folklore encompasses the informally learned folk traditions of African Americans as expressed in its oral traditions, customs and customary rituals, and material culture.

== African-American folktales overview ==
African-American folktales are a storytelling tradition rooted in Africa. These folktales are a testament to a rich oral tradition that spread when Africans were brought to the Americas as slaves. Most African-American folktales fall into one of eight categories of tales: origin stories, trickery and trouble, triumph over natural or supernatural evils, comic or heartwarming, God and the devil, life lessons, ghosts and spirits, slaves and their enslavers. Many revolve around anthropomorphic animals with the same morals and shortcomings as humans, providing a sense of relatability. New tales voice the African experience in the Americas; however, many tales still maintain the traditional style and tell of their African roots. Although many of the original stories evolved since Africans were brought to the Americas as slaves, their meanings and life lessons have remained the same.

=== History ===
Enslaved Black people frequently crafted stories featuring animals such as rabbits, foxes, bears, wolves, turtles, snakes, and possums, imbuing them with the traits of the individuals they encountered in the unfamiliar setting of the plantation.

== Themes ==
African-American tales place emphasis on beginnings and transformations, whether focused on a character, an event, or the creation of the world. Some examples of origin stories include "How Jackal Became an Outcast" and "Terrapin's Magic Dipper and Whip", which respectively explain the solitary nature of jackals and why turtles have shells.

=== Trickery and trouble ===
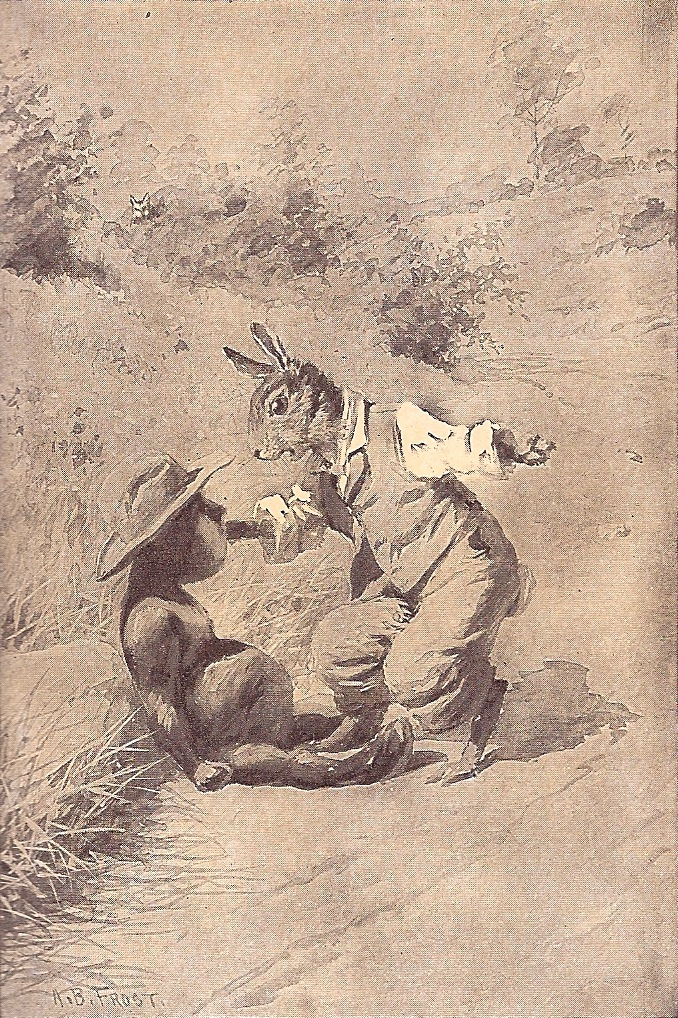
Br'er Rabbit and the Tar Baby

Tricksters in folk stories are commonly amoral characters, whether human or animal who succeed through deception and exploiting the weaknesses of others. They use their wits to resolve conflict and achieve their goals. Two examples of African-American tricksters are Br'er Rabbit and Anansi.

Tricksters in African-American folktales take a comedic approach and contain underlying themes of inequality, compared to other folktales that label their tricksters as menaces. The National Humanities Center notes that trickster stories "contain serious commentary on the inequities of existence in a country where the promises of democracy were denied to a large portion of the citizenry, a pattern that becomes even clearer in the literary adaptations of trickster figures".

African-American folktales do not always contain an actual trickster. Sometimes, they operate around themes of trickery tactics. For example, Charles Chesnutt collected a series of stories and created The Conjure Woman (1899). One of the trickster's tactics in the story is "how an enslaved man is spared being sent from one plantation to another by having his wife, who is a conjure woman, turns him into a tree. The trickery works until a local sawmill selects that particular tree to cut".

In other tales, personified animals try to imitate the trickster, though it backfires on them. An example is in Crawling Into the Elephant's Belly, in which Yawarri, an anteater, follows Anansi, the trickster, and blackmails him to be brought to the king's elephants. Yawarri's family is starving, and he is upset at Anansi because of all the elephant meat Anansi is eating, which is the king's property. After jumping the wall, Anansi instructs Yawarri on how to get inside the elephant, telling him only to take a small piece of meat from the elephant so the king will not notice. However, since Yawarri is starving, he eats at the inside of the elephant until it dies. At sunrise, the king finds him in the beast's belly and kills him. This shows how an ordinary citizen can get wrapped up in the scheme of a trickster. Other tales that display this theme are "Why They Name the Stories for Anansi" and "A License to Steal", although there are many more.

=== Comic heartwarming tales ===
Comic and heartwarming African-American folktales "stimulate the imagination with wonders and are told to remind us of the perils and the possibilities." The stories are about heroes, heroines, villains, and fools. Some examples:

- "The Red Feather": responds to the intertwining of cultures, ending with heroes bringing forth gifts.
- "Rabbit Rides Wolf": is a story that represents the amalgamation of African and Creek descent where a hero emerges during a time of conflict.

=== Teaching life lessons ===
African folklore is a means to hand down traditions and duties through generations. Stories are often passed down orally at gatherings by groups of children and elders. This type of gathering was known as "Tales by Midnight"and contained cultural lessons that prepared children for their future. These anthropomorphic animals made the stories compelling to young children, and included singing, dancing, or themes such as greed, honesty, and loyalty.

One example used by generations of storytellers for African children is the "Tale of The Midnight Goat Thief", which originated in Zimbabwe, and is a tale of misplaced trust. A hare betrays the trust of a loyal baboon, framing him for the death of a goat. After the baboon's friend, a jackal, hears about what happened to him, he tries to replicate what the hare did to the baboon to get revenge. However, the hare outwits the jackal and finds a way to counter his actions. When the sun rises, the jackal is caught red-handed with the blood he planned to frame the hare with. The moral of the story is to be loyal and honest, and to not copy the ways of the cunning, as they may outwit you.

=== Spiritual ===
==== Ghosts and spirits ====
African-American tales of ghosts and spirits were commonly told of a "spook" or "haint" or "haunt," referring to repeated visits by ghosts or spirits that keep one awake at night. Another type of haint, or spirit, feared in Gullah culture and connected to Hoodoo is the plat eye. The plat eye is a one-eyed ghost that can morph into various forms. It is said to be conjured when a person buries the head of a murdered man inside a hole with treasure.

The story "Possessed of Two Spirits" recounts a personal experience in conjuring magic powers in both the living and the spiritual world, a common trope in African-American folklore. The story "Married to a Boar Hog" emerged during the American Revolution against the British. The story is of a young woman who marries a supernatural entity, such as a boar, and is saved from her disease, such as leprosy, clubfoot, or yaws. "Married to a Boar Hog" is passed down from British Caribbean slaves in reference to their African origin and the hardships they endured. Night Doctors, although based on some factual occurrences, have been mythical creatures identical to bogeymen.

==== God and the Devil ====
African-American folktales show how the world was formed and the foundations of morality. Supernatural conflicts between God and the Devil are often the main focus of these tales. However, man versus man, and slave versus master are also popular disputes. There is typically a "negotiator" in these tales who is actively trying to persuade "the judge" to side with their position. However, if the judge, or God, does not like the outcome of the situation, they will often invoke a countermeasure to bring order to the situation. In these tales, the God, or gods, are inherently good and do not invoke wrath upon the people, even if the subject veers off the path of righteousness. Whereas, the devil, or devils, are sometimes a personification of evil. Additionally, there is often a transaction between God and man in these tales, one in which God is willing to help man, but only if the man is "offering sacrifices and performing rites and ceremonies in a manner acceptable to the god".

An example of one of these tales is "Never Seen His Equal". The opening dialogue of this tale discusses how only man has seen his equal, but God has not. It then describes how the devil opposes God and, in Genesis, ultimately manifests himself as a serpent to trick Adam and Eve who reside in the Garden. This tells the story of the fall of man through Adam and Eve eating the forbidden fruit when tempted by the serpent, and how women now have to have pain in childbirth and men have to work for survival.

=== Slavery ===
Although many slaves during this time could not read or write, they could recite folktales as a method of relaying information to each other, sharing vital knowledge that would aid in their survival. In African-American tales, the depiction of slavery often employs a rhetoric that may appear unconventional by modern standards, as the language transmitted across generations deviates from the typical racial narrative. When confronted with the harsh reality of slavery, African-American folktales served as a method to cope with the situation and document their history of slavery in America. An example of a work that conveys the African-American slave experience in America is The Conjure Woman. This collection of short stories, written by African-American author Charles W. Chestnutt, deals with the theme of racial identity from the perspective of a freed slave.

Chesnutt's tales depict the challenges encountered by freed slaves in the post-war South, offering a reflective view on the difficulties of those who were marginalized during this period.

Chesnutt's language surrounding African-American folklore derived from the standards of the racial narrative of his era. By using vernacular language, Chesnutt was able to deviate from the racial norms and formulate a new, more valorized message of folk heroes. Chesnutt writes "on the other side" of standard racial narratives, effectively refuting them by evoking a different kind of "racial project" in his fictional work.

== Examples ==
=== High John de Conqueror ===
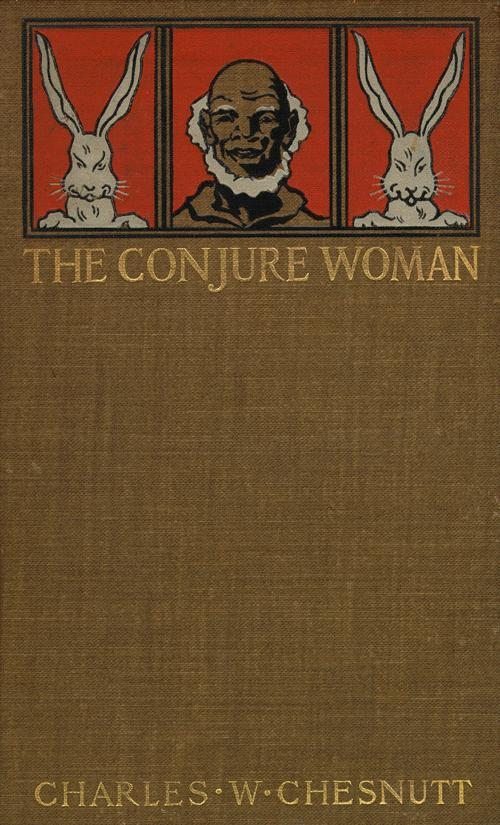
Conjure Woman (1899)

The book Mojo Workin': The Old African American Hoodoo System discusses the folk spirit High John de Conqueror, whose spirit lies within the "John the Conqueror root" in the Hoodoo tradition. In African-American folk stories, High John de Conqueror was an African prince who was kidnapped from Africa and enslaved in the United States. He was a trickster and used his charm to deceive and outsmart his slaveholders. After the American Civil War, before High John de Conqueror returned to Africa, he told the newly freed slaves that if they ever needed his spirit for freedom, his spirit would be at rest within a root they could use. According to some scholars, the origin of High John de Conqueror may have originated from African male deities such as Elegua, who is a trickster spirit in West Africa.

Zora Neale Hurston documented some history about High John de Conqueror from her discussions with African Americans in the South in her book, The Sanctified Church. Some African Americans believed High John de Conqueror freed the slaves, and that President Abraham Lincoln and the Civil War did not bring freedom for Black people. Aunt Shady Anne Sutton, a woman interviewed by Hurston, affirms this belief: "These young Negroes reads they books and talk about the war freeing the Negroes, by Aye Lord! A heap sees, but a few knows. 'Course, the war was a lot of help, but how come the war took place? They think they knows, but they don't. John de Conqueror had done put it into the white folks to give us our freedom". In consonance with Sutton's statement, it had been the teachings by High John de Conqueror that assisted in the freedom of slaves, as opposed to the efforts by Lincoln and the actions taken during the Civil War. The root also provided protection against whippings from slaveholders and provided freedom from chattel slavery. Frederick Douglass' experience with the root supports this belief, as it is said he avoided being whipped and beaten by a slave-breaker because he had it in possession. A second instance of the root's impact is told through the eyes of Henry Bibb, who was born into slavery, as he used the root to protect himself by chewing and spitting it towards his enslaver.

=== Flying Africans ===
Flying Africans of legend escaped enslavement by a magical flight over the ocean back to Africa. Novelist Toni Morrison makes references to African American spirituality in her literature, and her novel Song of Solomon, published in 1977, tells the story of the character Milkman, an African American in search of his African ancestors. Milkman lived in the North but returned to the South in search of his ancestry. By the end of the book, Milkman learns he comes from a family of African medicine people and gained his ancestral powers and his soul flew back to Africa after he died. The legend may have been inspired by a historical event in Georgia. In 1803, a slave ship landed on the coast of Georgia in St. Simons Island with captive Africans from Nigeria with a cargo of Igbo people. The Igbo people chose suicide than a lifetime of slavery by walking into the swamp and drowning. The most common saying from slaves was, "I would rather live on my feet than die on my knees". This location became known as Igbo Landing in Georgia. According to African American folklore, the souls of the Igbos that committed suicide flew back to Africa.

=== Sukey and The Mermaid ===
In African-American folklore, there is a story about a girl named Sukey meeting a mermaid named Mama Jo. Mama Jo in the story helps and protects Sukey and financially supports her by giving her gold coins. This story comes from the belief in Simbi spirits from the Bakongo people of West-Central Africa, who came to the United States during the trans-Atlantic slave trade. In Africa, Simbi nature spirits protect and provide riches to their followers. In West-Central Africa, there are folk stories of people meeting mermaids. Among the Gullah Geechee people in the Carolina Lowcountry and Sea Islands is a children's story called Sukey and the Mermaid written by Robert D. San Souci. In the African diaspora, there are Afro-American folk stories of a little girl meeting a mermaid. During the era of slavery, Simbi folk stories in enslaved black communities provided hope from enslavement. It was believed that Simbi spirits help guide freedom seekers (runaway slaves) to freedom or to maroon communities during their escape from slavery on the Underground Railroad, because Simbi spirits reside in nature.

=== Uncle Monday ===
In African-American folklore, Uncle Monday was a conjurer, medicine man, and shapeshifter from Africa enslaved in the Southern United States. Uncle Monday escaped from slavery on the Underground Railroad and traveled through South Carolina and Georgia and made his final stop in Florida living amongst the Seminole people and Black Seminoles. He led a resistance movement against enslavement using his conjure powers. In the folktale, Seminole people and Black Seminoles beat their drums and Uncle Monday danced to the rhythms of Seminole and African music and turned into an alligator. After turning into an alligator, Uncle Monday went to the swamp waters and the other alligators followed him. In his alligator form, he and the others defeated the slaveholders. This folktale added historical accounts of the alliance between the Seminole people and Black Seminoles and their resistance movement against enslavement, and fictional stories about magic and shapeshifting.

== Impact of African-American folklore ==
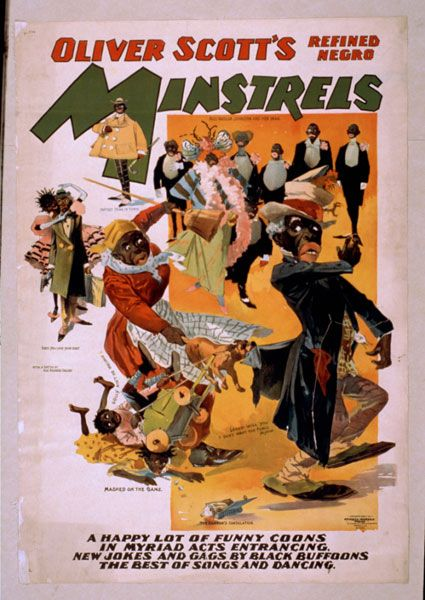
"Oliver Scott's Refined Negro Minstrels . . . ," 1898, Prints and Photographs Division, Library of Congress

During the 19th century, the white community began to use African-American folklore as a propaganda tool for disseminating Black stereotypes and erroneous views, such as characterizing the African-American Vernacular as strange and grammatically unstructured. The advent of these ideologies coincided with the rise of the minstrel shows, whose performers and producers would compose songs and books in the "black dialect" with a view to boosting their reputation. This practice is exemplified by the famous minstrel artist Thomas D. Rice who popularized the character Jim Crow. Through songs, dances, and other forms of African-American folklore, he and other minstrels cemented harmful portrayals of African Americans. Some Maafa apologists used these stories to push racist ideologies. Some academic journals have appeared to challenge this rhetoric, as these authors displayed bias and utilized stories that showed negative stereotypes. In 1877, journalist William Owens stated that African-American traits have "a fitness" to the characteristics portrayed in African folklore. Some claim that author Roger D. Abrahams perpetuated these in his book Afro-American folktales. He pushed the point that African-American folklore is an "immoral reflection" of African religions and "animal tales are a reflection of African's childlike mannerisms".

African-American folklore was predominantly used for guidance and protection. Some say the folklore acts as a "secret language". Folklore like "Wade in the Water", "Down by the River", and "Old Bill Rolling Pin", were used to help people escaping enslavement alert each other to danger like dogs or people patrolling.

== African-American folklore in media ==
=== Art and craft ===
- Quilting, including story quilting and pictorial quilting.

=== Music ===
==== Hip-Hop ====
Folklore's impact also translates to today, as some tropes are seen in modern-day Hip-Hop. The trickster trope originated as a way to display enslaved people's wit over slave masters. After emancipation, this trope transformed into badman, which reflected the new ways of life. The badman was viewed as more of an outlaw. In the badman trope existed a sub-genre called Stagolee, which was based on a pimp named Lee Shelton, who killed a man after gambling and losing his hat. Stagolee's story was told in many forms, from blues to jazz, and made its way to a style called "Toast". Toast is "a story told in the first person that was recited in verse". The rappers would use this trope to embody themselves, and it gave them charisma. This translates to the beginning of Hip-Hop and artists like Snoop Dogg, utilized these story-telling methods. Stagolee's influence also translated to clothing similar to Hip-Hop. In the late 1800s, black men wore the Stetson Hat worn by Stagolee as a status symbol. This commodification can be seen in Hip-hop today through cars, girls, baggy pants, etc. Some artists still use characteristics of the original trickster archetype as well. Common themes in hip-hop, such as hyper-sexuality, vulgarity, hyper-masculinity, and revenge, are seen through lyrics of rap artists like Da Brat to Juvenile and heavily used in Tricker-related folklore like Anansi.

=== Movies and cartoons ===
The 1946 Film Song of the South adapted Joel Chandler Harris's publication of African-American folktales collected under the title Uncle Remus and His Tales of Br'er Rabbit The film received poor reviews for of its portrayal of Uncle Remus and for being unengaging. "Glorification of slavery" is how NAACP executive Walter White described it. Despite these flaws, Song of the South won an Academy Award for best original song with "Zip-A-Dee-Doo-Dah", while James Baskett, the actor in the role of Uncle Remus, received an Honorary Oscar.

Director and cartoonist Frederick Bean "Tex" Avery was known to invoke ethnic stereotypes in his films. He would notably use the Bebop trope in his animations. The use of Bebop can be seen through one of his most famous characters, Bugs Bunny from Looney Tunes. Bugs Bunny's personality borrows from the mannerisms of Bebop musicians. One of these characteristics can be seen in the animation titled, A Wild Hare (1940). When Bugs allows Elmer Fudd, to shoot at him, displaying "aloofness in the face of violence", commonly associated with Bebop. Bug's popular catchphrase "What's up, Doc" shows "coolness" to the threat posed by Elmer Fudd. Some have argued that his catchphrase is similar to black people during the mid-1900s, like "You don't scare me".

In numerous superhero films and cartoons, there are mentions of various African American Folklore Characters. For example, Anansi the Spider has been seen in Static Shock, The Amazing Spider-Man, and American Gods. John Henry is also seen in animated shows like The Grim Adventures of Billy & Mandy Season 6, Teen Titans Go! Season 5, and a modern-day movie adaptation starring Terry Crews called John Henry.

=== Video games ===
Writer Zaire Lanier incorporated folk tales and creatures from African-American and Southern history, and original tales, in the fictionalized south in South of Midnight.

== List of African-American folktales ==
- A Story, A Story – by Gale E. Hayley
- Afiong the Proud Princess
- Anansi the Spider – by Gerald McDermott
- Annie Christmas
- Big Liz
- Boo Hag
- Candyman
- Chloe (or Cloe) of Myrtles Plantation
- Finding the Green Stone – by Alice Walker
- Gullah storytelling
- Hold Him, Tabb
- I Know Moon Rise
- I'm Coming Down Now
- John Henry the Steel Driving Man
- Mirandy and Brother Wind
- Mufaro's Beautiful Daughters – by John Steptoe
- Never Mind Them Watermelons
- No King as God
- Signifying monkey
- Sukey and the Mermaid – by Robert D. San Souci
- The Baby Mouse and the Baby Snake
- The Black Cat's Message
- The Calabash Kids – from Tanzania
- The Cheetah and the Lazy Hunter – from the Zulu
- The Midnight Goat Thief
- The Shrouded Horseman
- The Talking Eggs – by Robert D. San Souci
- The Value of a Person
- Uncle Remus stories (List of Uncle Remus characters)
  - Br'er Fox and Br'er Bear (Br'er Bear's House)
  - Br'er Frog
  - Br'er Rabbit
  - Tar-Baby
- Wait Until Emmet Comes
- Why Dogs Chase Cats
- Why Lizards Don't Sit
- Why Mosquitoes Buzz in People's Ears – Verna Aardema
- Why the Sky is Far Away – by Mary-Joan Gerson
- Woe and Happiness
- Mythopia – Digital archive of African folktales, myths, and legends

== See also ==
- Anansi
- Br'er Bear
- Dozens
- African-American folklorists
- Slavery in the United States
- Treatment of the enslaved in the United States
