= In the Beginning: Creation Stories from Around the World =

1988 illustrated collection of 25 creation myths by Virginia Hamilton

In The Beginning: Creation Stories from Around the World
- Author: Virginia Hamilton
- Illustrator: Barry Moser
- Cover artist: Barry Moser
- Language: English
- Genre: Mythology
- Publisher: Harcourt
- Publication date: 1988
- Publication place: United States
- Media type: Hardback / Paperback
- ISBN: 0-15-238740-4

In The Beginning: Creation Stories from Around the World is a 1988 collection of 25 creation stories from cultures around the world written by Virginia Hamilton and illustrated by Barry Moser. It was well-received, earning a Newbery Honor in 1989, Hamilton's second after Sweet Whispers, Brother Rush in 1983, an American Institute of Graphic Arts design award, a Children's Book Council notable book recognition, and a National Science Teaching Association outstanding book recognition.

== Included stories ==
The culture, mythology, or source is listed in parentheses

- The Pea-Pod Man (Inuit)
- Finding Night (Qat)
- An Endless Sea of Mud (Kono)
- Bursting from the Hen's Egg (Pangu)
- Traveling to Form the World (Blackfoot)
- First Man Becomes the Devil (Ülgen; Erlik; Pajana)
- Turtle Dives to the Bottom of the Sea (Maidu)
- Moon and Sun (Fon)
- Bandicoots Come from His Body (Arrernte)
- Spider Ananse Finds Something (Wulbari)
- The Woman Who Fell from the Sky (Wyandot)
- Man Copies God (Lozi)
- The Frost Giant (Norse; section of Prose Edda)
- Owner of the Sky (Yoruba)
- Marduk, God of Gods (section of Enūma Eliš)
- Four Creations to Make Man (Kʼicheʼ; see also Popol Vuh)
- The Angry Gods (Ta-aroa; Tangaroa)
- Sun, Life, Wind, and Death (Lowa)
- The Sun-God and the Dragon (Egyptian)
- Separation of Earth and Sky (Minyong)
- First Man, First Woman (Hebrew; section of the Torah)
- The Coming of All Things (Greek; section of Theogony)
- The God Brings Fire to Man (Greek)
- Pandora (Greek)
- In the Beginning (Hebrew; section of the Torah)
