= 1972–1973 Mark Twain Awards =

The Mark Twain Readers Award is given annually to a book for children in grades four through six.

== Winner ==
- Mrs. Frisby and the Rats of Nimh by Robert C. O'Brien

== Nominations ==
- The King's Fountain by Lloyd Alexander
- Goody Hall by Natalie Babbitt
- Feldman Fieldmouse by Nathaniel Benchley
- Joseph, The Dreamer by Clyde Robert Bulla
- A Room Made of Windows by Eleanor Cameron
- The Spider, The Cave and the Pottery Bowl by Eleanor Clymer
- Jingo Django by Sid Fleischman
- All Upon a Stone by Jean Craighead George
- The Planet of Junior Brown by Virginia Hamilton
- The Trees Stand Shining by Hettie Jones
- The Tombs of Atuan by Ursula K. Le Guin
- Kate by Jean Little
- Annie and the Old One by Miska Miles
- The Vicksburg Veteran by F. N. Monjo
- Deep Trouble by Walt Morey
- The Almost Year by Florence Randall
- The Bear's House by Marilyn Sachs
- The Headless Cupid by Zilpha Snyder
- By the Highway Home by Mary Stolz
- Chipmunks on the Doorstep by Edwin Tunis
