= Justice and Her Brothers =

1978 children's science fiction novel by Virginia Hamilton

- Author: Virginia Hamilton
- Series: The Justice Trilogy
- Genre: science fiction young adult
- Publisher: Greenwillow Books
- Publication date: 1978
- Publication place: United States of America
- ISBN: 978-0-688-80182-3
- Followed by: Dustland; The Gathering

Justice and Her Brothers is a 1978 science fiction novel for young adults by award-winning author Virginia Hamilton. The novel, like many by Hamilton, is set in Yellow Springs, Ohio — the author's birthplace. It is the first novel of The Justice Trilogy and is followed by Dustland (1980) and The Gathering (1981).

== Background ==
In an article for The Horn Book Magazine, Hamilton explained that Blackness in her works is sometimes significant and sometimes not. In Justice and Her Brothers, Hamilton noted:

"race has nothing whatever to do with plot and the outcome for the characters. The powers of extrasensory perception, telepathy, and telekinesis the children have are not meant to be peculiarities. They represent a majestic change in the human race."

== Plot ==
The story is told over one week during a hot summer in Ohio. Protagonist Justice Douglass is dealing with the fact that her mother is attending college and has to spend time away from the home, leaving Justice to the care of her twin older brothers, Thomas and Levi. Levi clearly cares for Justice, both with domestic tasks and emotionally, while Thomas is antagonistic toward Justice.

Thomas has established the Great Snake Race, a competition for the boys in the neighborhood, and Justice prepares by seeking out the snake that is both the largest and the fastest. Concurrently, Justice notices that Thomas seems to be able to mentally control his twin brother Levi. Fear of Thomas brings Justice to the home of Mrs. Leona Jefferson and her son Dorian Jefferson, mother and child. Mrs. Leona Jefferson teaches Justice about her own psychic abilities, both to protect Levi and to practice her own power.

Justice learns that the object of the Great Snake Race is not to actually race snakes but to catch the most. Justice, thinking she will lose, ends up winning over Thomas, as her snake was pregnant and had offspring. After the Race, Thomas probes Justice's mind and tries to control her. Justice and neighbor Dorian battle against Thomas, defeating him. The children then link minds and Justice transports them to the future, briefly, where they learn that as a group, they are the "first unit," a new kind of human.

== Characters ==
- Justice Douglass, aged 11, is the protagonist of the novel. Justice is dealing with her mother's absence from the home (to attend college). Throughout the novel, Justice comes to learn that she has psychic abilities
- Thomas Douglass, aged 13, is Justice's brother. He is an avid drummer
- Levi Douglass is Thomas's twin brother
- Mrs. Douglass, Justice and the twins' mother, attends college
- Mr. Douglass, the children's father, is a stonecutter
- Dorian Jefferson is a neighborhood boy who has psychic powers
- Mrs. Leona Jefferson is Dorian's mother. She is a Sensitive who teaches Justice about her abilities

== Themes ==
The novel deals with ideas of loneliness in childhood, the family unit and its effect on children, and identity.

== Reception ==
In a review in The New York Times, Jean Fritz wrote that "the book is like an expertly crafted, highly original painting over which a surrealistic film has been tacked." School Library Journal praised Hamilton's descriptions, noting "many rich details... are skillfully woven into a complex plot all the more chilling for being so firmly grounded in reality." In The Junior Bookshelf, M. Hobbs noted "[Hamilton] is a Black novelist using racial characteristics in a new, altogether fascinating way."

One critic debated the appropriate age of the novel's audience, due to its complexity. In The Christian Science Monitor, Clive Lawrence wrote "Is it suitable for 12-year-olds? I have to say no. The average child will find it boringly serious."

== Influence ==
At the time of its publishing, Justice and Her Brothers was one of few science-fiction young adult novels featuring Black characters.

== Awards ==
The novel was a Coretta Scott King Award honor book in 1979.
