= Igbo Landing =

Historic site at Dunbar Creek, Georgia, US

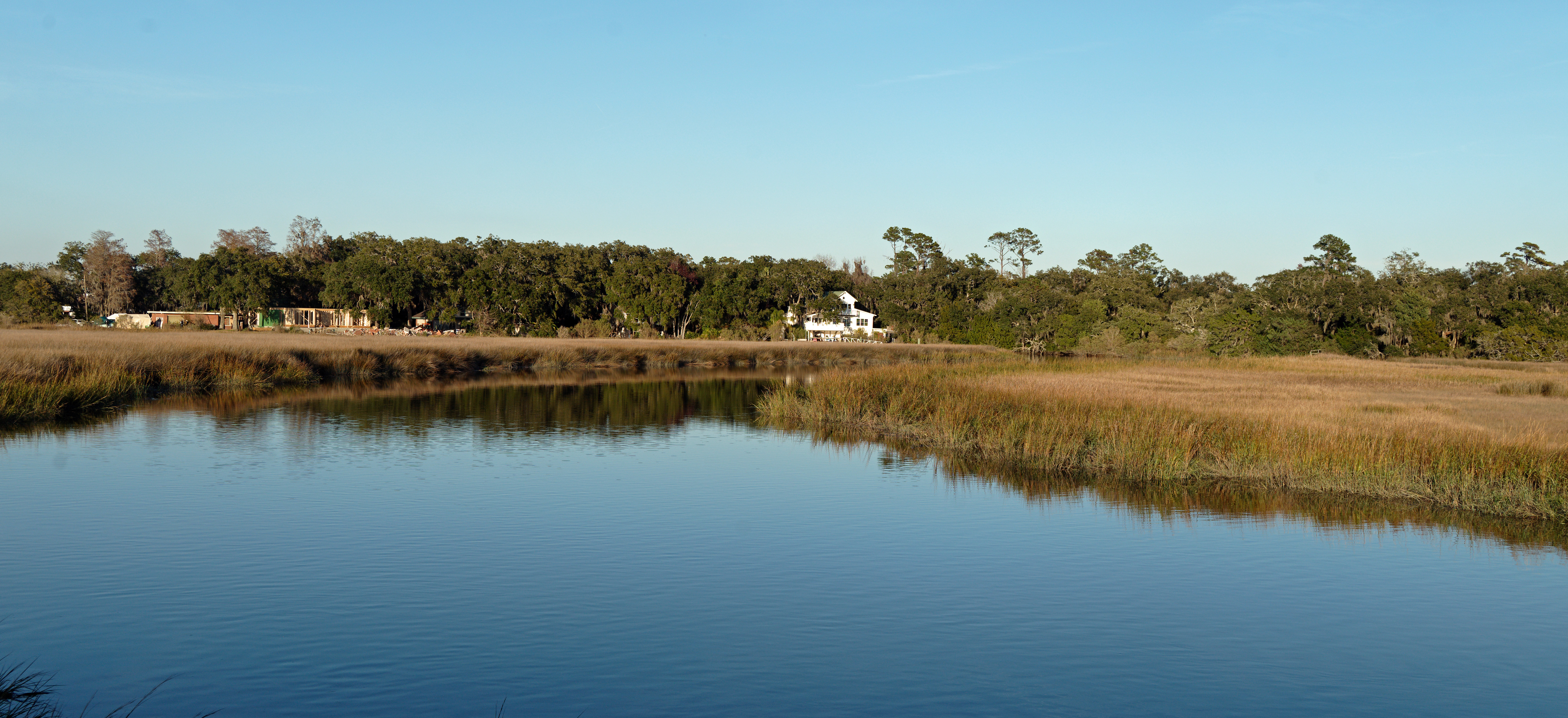
- The area of Igbo Landing

- Location within Georgia Location within the United States
- 31°11′14″N 81°23′14″W
- Location: Dunbar Creek, St. Simons Island in Glynn County, Georgia, United States

Igbo Landing
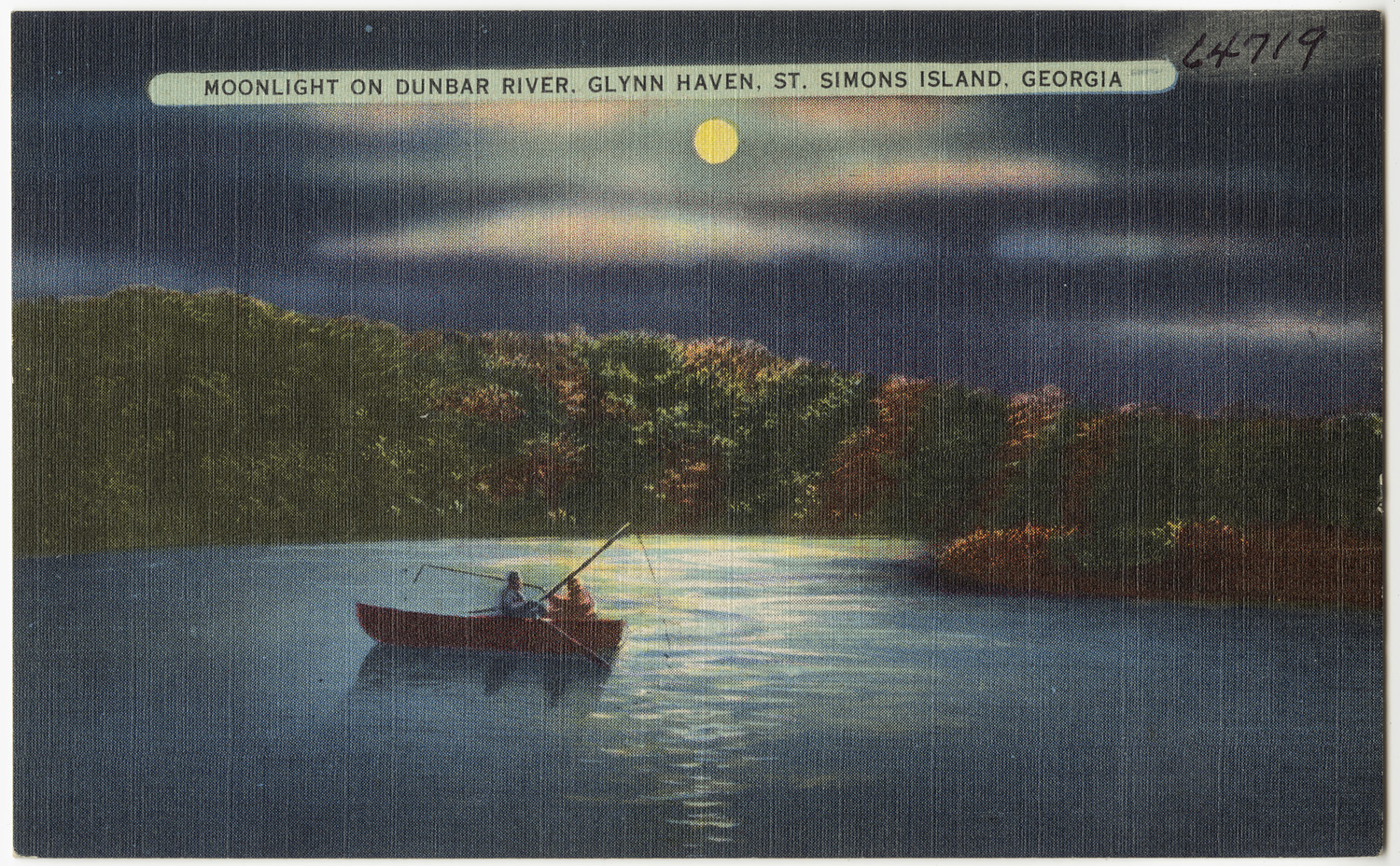
- A 1930 post card showing moonlight on Dunbar River, Glynn Haven, St. Simons Island, Georgia
- Date: May 1803
- Participants: A group of 75 Igbo enslaved people
- Outcome: Mass suicide in opposition to slavery in the United States. Notable influence on African American folklore and literature
- Deaths: 13 bodies of drowned enslaved people were recovered and 3 white overseers drowned but actual numbers of deaths uncertain

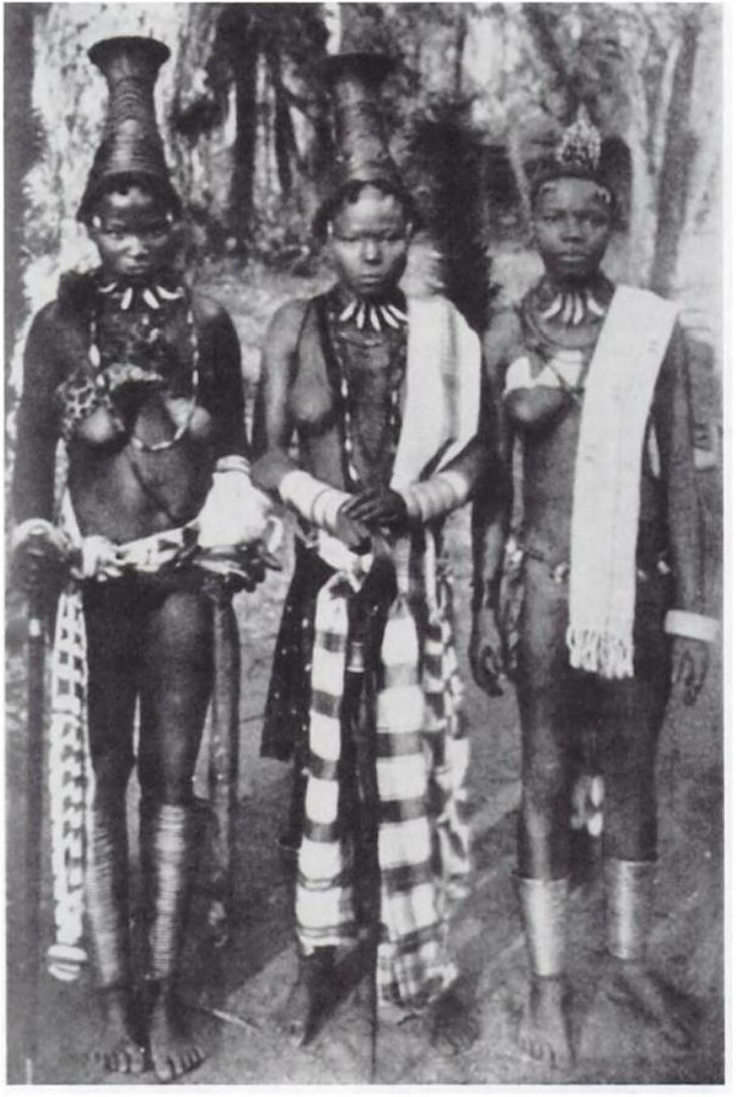
Igbo women, photographed in Nigeria, early 20th century

Igbo Landing (also called Ibo Landing, Ebo Landing, or Ebos Landing) is a historic site at Dunbar Creek on St. Simons Island, Glynn County, Georgia. It was the setting of a mass suicide in 1803 by captive Igbo people who had taken control of the slave ship they were on, and refused to submit to slavery in the United States. The event's moral value as a story of resistance towards slavery has symbolic importance in African American folklore as the flying Africans legend, and in literary history.

== History ==
In May 1803 a shipload of captive West Africans, upon surviving the Middle Passage, were landed by U.S.-paid captors in Savannah by a slave ship, to be auctioned off at one of the local slave markets. The ship's enslaved passengers included a number of Igbo people from what is now Nigeria. The Igbo were known by planters and slavers of the American South for being fiercely independent and resistant to chattel slavery. The group of 75 enslaved Igbo people were bought by agents of John Couper and Thomas Spalding for forced labor on their plantations in St. Simons Island for $100 each.

The chained enslaved people were packed under the deck of a small vessel named The Schooner York to be shipped to the island (other sources say the voyage took place aboard The Morovia). During this voyage the Igbo slaves rose up in rebellion, taking control of the ship and drowning their captors, in the process causing the grounding of the Morovia in Dunbar Creek at the site now locally known as Igbo Landing.

The following sequence of events is unclear, as there are several versions of the revolt's development, some of which are considered mythological. Apparently the Africans went ashore and subsequently, under the direction of a high Igbo chief among them, walked in unison into the creek singing in the Igbo language "The Water Spirit brought us, the Water Spirit will take us home". They thereby accepted the protection of their god Chukwu and death over the alternative of slavery. Roswell King, a white overseer on the nearby Pierce Butler plantation (Butler Island Plantation), wrote one of the few contemporary accounts of the incident, which states that as soon as the Igbo landed on St. Simons Island they took to the swamp, committing suicide by walking into Dunbar Creek. A 19th-century account of the event identifies the captain by the surname Patterson and names Roswell King as the person who recovered the bodies of the drowned. A letter describing the event written by Savannah slave dealer William Mein states that the Igbo walked into the marsh, where 10 to 12 drowned, while some were "salvaged" by bounty hunters who received $10 a head from Spalding and Couper. According to some sources, survivors of the Igbo rebellion were taken to Cannon's Point on St. Simons Island and Sapelo Island.

== Historical context ==
Igbo Landing was the final scene of events which in 1803 amounted to a "major act of resistance" by the Africans. These events have had enduring symbolic importance in African-American folklore and literary history. The mutiny by the Igbo people has been referred to as the first "freedom march" in the history of America. Although for more than two centuries most authorities considered the accounts to be an Afro-American folktale, research since 1980 has verified the factual basis of the legend and its historical content. The site was included as a historic resource in a 2009 county survey.

The site itself bears no official historical marker, but one has been placed in a space nearby. A sewage disposal plant was built beside the historical site in the 1940s despite local opposition by African Americans. The site is still routinely visited by historians and tourists. The event has recently been incorporated into the history curriculum of coastal Georgia schools.

== Oral history ==
The story of the Igbo slaves who chose death over a life of slavery is a recurring story that has taken deep roots in African American and Gullah oral history. As is typical of oral histories, the facts have evolved over time.

=== Myth of the water-walking Africans ===
Floyd White, an elderly African American interviewed by the Federal Writers' Project in the 1930s is recorded as saying:

Heard about the Ibo's Landing? That's the place where they bring the Ibos over in a slave ship and when they get here, they ain't like it and so they all start singing and they march right down in the river to march back to Africa, but they ain't able to get there. They gets drown.

A typical Gullah telling of the events, incorporating many of the recurrent themes that are common to most myths related to the Igbo Landing, is recorded by Linda S. Watts:

The West Africans upon assessing their situation resolved to risk their lives by walking home over the water rather than submit to the living death that awaited them in American slavery. As the tale has it, the tribes people disembark from the ship, and as a group, turned around and walked along the water, traveling in the opposite direction from the arrival port. As they took this march together, the West Africans joined in song. They are reported to have sung a hymn in which the lyrics assert that the water spirits will take them home. While versions of this story vary in nuance, all attest to the courage in rebellion displayed by the enslaved Igbo.

=== Myth of the flying Africans ===
Another popular legend associated with Igbo Landing is known as the myth of the flying Africans. It was recorded from various oral sources in the 1930s by members of the Federal Writers' Project. In these cases, the Africans are reputed to have grown wings, or turned into vultures, before flying back home to freedom in Africa. Wallace Quarterman, an African American born in 1844, who was interviewed in 1930, when asked if he had heard about the Igbo landing states:

Ain't you heard about them? Well, at that time Mr. Blue he was the overseer and ... Mr. Blue he go down one morning with a long whip for to whip them good. ... Anyway, he whipped them good and they got together and stuck that hoe in the field and then ... rose up in the sky and turned themselves into buzzards and flew right back to Africa. ... Everybody knows about them.

As Professor Terri L. Snyder notes:

The flying African folktale probably has its historical roots in an 1803 collective suicide by newly imported slaves. A group of Igbo (variously, Ebo or Ibo) captives who had survived the middle passage were sold near Savannah, Georgia, and reloaded onto a small ship bound for St. Simon's Island. Off the coast of the island, the enslaved cargo, who had "suffered much by mismanagement," "rose" from their confinement in the small vessel, and revolted against the crew, forcing them into the water where they drowned. After the ship ran aground, the Igbos "took to the marsh" and drowned themselves—an act that most scholars have understood as a deliberate, collective suicide. The site of their fatal immersion was named Ebos Landing. The fate of those Igbo in 1803 gave rise to a distinctive regional folklore and a place name.

This theory is disputed, however, by Professor Jeroen Dewulf, who argues that there are frequent references to Igbos as well as to enslaved Africans flying home in the Federal Writers' Project interviews, but that theories connecting both are built on weak foundations. Dewulf, instead, traces the origins of the myth of the flying Africans to the Kingdom of Loango and the Kingdom of Kongo in Central Africa.

=== Reported haunting ===
Local people claim that the Igbo Landing and surrounding marshes in Dunbar Creek are haunted by the souls of the dead Igbo who were enslaved.

== Legacy ==
In September 2002, the St. Simons African-American Heritage Coalition organized a two-day commemoration with events related to Igbo history and a procession to the site. The 75 attendees came from other states, as well as Nigeria, and Belize and Haiti, where similar resistance had taken place. They gathered to designate the site as holy ground and give the souls rest. The account of the Igbo is now part of the curriculum for coastal Georgia schools.

=== Historical marker ===
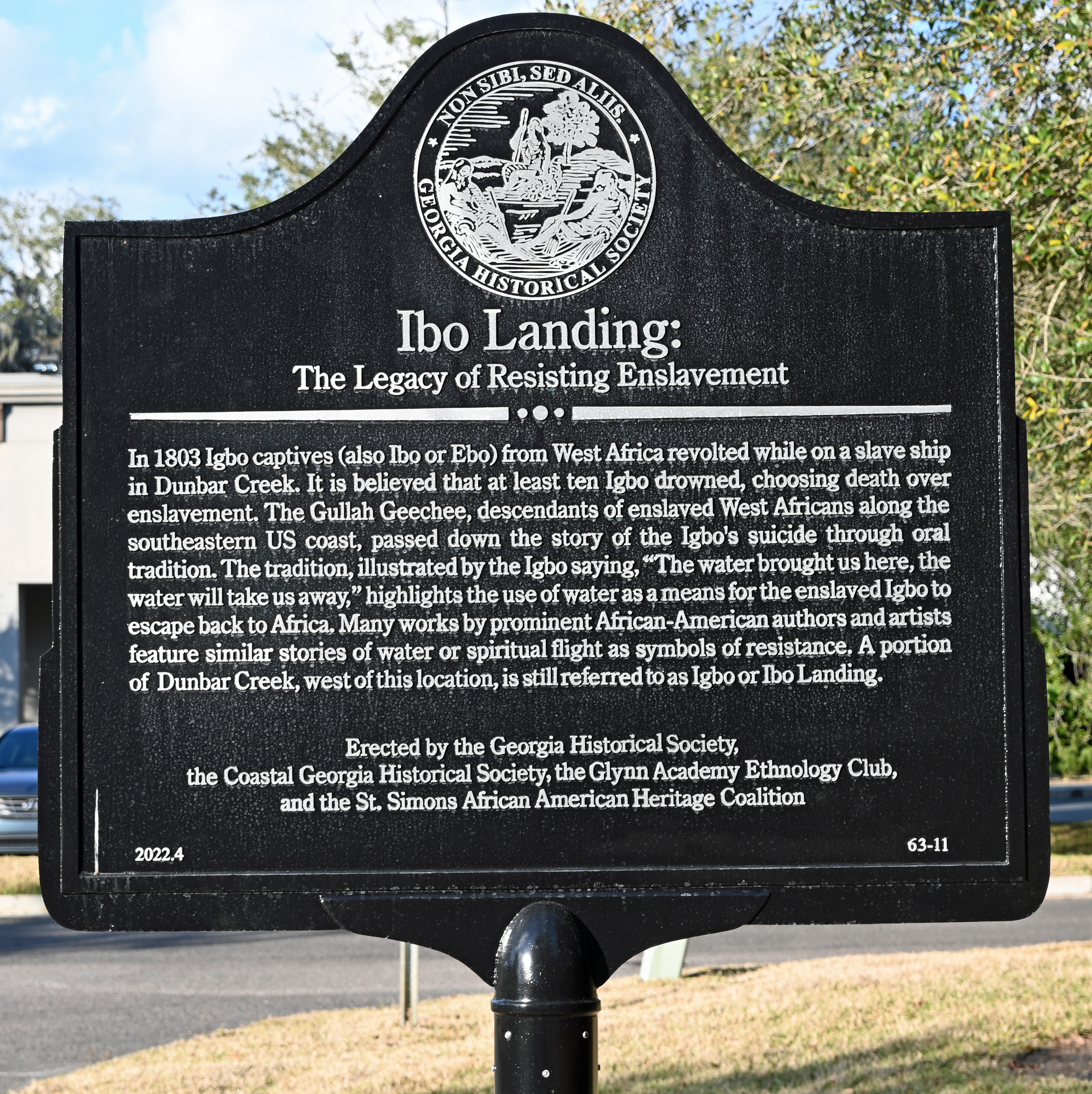
Historical marker, unveiled on May 24, 2022

In 2021, a group of students at the Glynn Academy Ethnology Club submitted an application to the Georgia Historical Society to erect a historical marker in honor of Igbo Landing. This included writing an in-depth and accurate research paper using primary source documents as part of the Georgia Historical Marker Program Marker Application, a competitive and selective process. The Glynn Academy Club reached out to the Coastal Georgia Historical Society and local Saint Simons African American Coalition for guidance.

After the application's acceptance, the Glynn Academy Ethnology Club raised roughly $2,500 for the marker. Another $2,500 came from the Coastal Georgia Historical Society. Igbo Landing itself is located on private property, and the historical marker was erected at a nearby greenspace owned by the St Simons Land Trust.

A celebration in honor of the unveiling of the sign was held on May 24, 2022, and was attended by roughly 100 people. The sign is located at Old Stables Corner on St Simons Island, Georgia, at the northwest corner of Frederica Road and Sea Island Road. It reads:

Ibo Landing: The Legacy of Resisting Enslavement

In 1803, Igbo captives (also Ibo or Ebo) from West Africa revolted while on a slave ship in Dunbar Creek. It is believed that at least ten Igbo drowned, choosing death over enslavement. The Gullah Geechee, descendants of enslaved West Africans along the southeastern US coast, passed down the story of the Igbo's suicide through oral tradition. The tradition, illustrated by the Igbo saying, "The water brought us here, the water will take us away," highlights the use of water as a means for the enslaved Igbo to escape back to Africa. Many works by prominent African-American authors and artists feature similar stories of water or spiritual flight as symbols of resistance. A portion of Dunbar Creek, west of this location, is still referred to as Igbo or Ibo Landing.

Erected by the Georgia Historical Society, the Coastal Georgia Historical Society, the Glynn Academy Ethnology Club, and the St. Simons African American Heritage Coalition

=== Representation in other media ===
The historical events pertaining to the Igbo slave escape in Dunbar Creek, and the associated myth, have inspired and influenced a number of artists from the African diaspora.

Examples include Nobel laureate Toni Morrison, who used the myth of the flying Africans in her novel, Song of Solomon, and Alex Haley, who retells the story in his book Roots. The Paule Marshall novel Praisesong for the Widow also was inspired by these events.

Beverly Buchanan's sculpture Marsh Ruins (1981), located at the Marshes of Glynn Overlook Park near Dunbar Creek, is partly an homage to Igbo Landing.

The events are retold from the context of the Gullah descendants in the feature film Daughters of the Dust (1991), directed by Julie Dash. The 1994 Ngozi Onwurah film Welcome II the Terrordome features a dramatization of the Igbo Landing, serving as a frame for the film's main plot and dystopian setting.

Other contemporary artists that allude to, or have integrated the complete tale of the Flying Africans in their work, include Joseph Zobel, Maryse Condé, Toni Cade Bambara, and Jamaica Kincaid. Imagery from the "Love Drought" portion of Beyoncé's visual album Lemonade is said to be inspired by Daughters of the Dust and the story of Igbo Landing.

In the 2018 Marvel film Black Panther, Michael B. Jordan, as Killmonger, references Igbo Landing during his death scene: "Bury me in the ocean with my ancestors who jumped from ships, 'cause they knew death was better than bondage."
