= Drylongso =

Drylongso, An African American idiom, may refer to:

- A sense of being that exemplifies the average African American way of being, doing, and thinking.
- Drylongso: A Self Portrait of Black America, a 1980 nonfiction oral history book by John Langston Gwaltney
- Drylongso (Hamilton book), a 1992 children's book by Virginia Hamilton, illustrated by Jerry Pinkney
- Drylongso (film), a 1998 film by Cauleen Smith
