= The Planet of Junior Brown =

- Directed by: Clement Virgo
- Written by: Clement Virgo; Cameron Bailey
- Based on: The Planet of Junior Brown by Virginia Hamilton
- Produced by: Eric Jordan; Paul Stephens; Victor Solnicki
- Starring: Martin Villafana; Rainbow Sun Francks; Clark Johnson; Lynn Whitfield; Margot Kidder
- Cinematography: Jonathan Freeman
- Edited by: Susan Maggi
- Music by: Christopher Dedrick
- Release date: 6 September 1997 (TIFF)
- Running time: 91 minutes
- Country: Canada
- Language: English

The Planet of Junior Brown, retitled Junior's Groove in some releases, is a 1997 Canadian drama film. Directed by Clement Virgo, the film was written by Virgo and Cameron Bailey as an adaptation of Virginia Hamilton's 1971 novel The Planet of Junior Brown. The adaptation changes the novels setting from 1970s Harlem to 1997 Toronto, where Virgo grew up.

The film stars Martin Villafana as the titular Junior Brown, an overweight and schizophrenic child prodigy studying piano from music teacher Miss Peebs (Margot Kidder). The film's cast also includes Rainbow Sun Francks, Clark Johnson, Lynn Whitfield, Sarah Polley, Richard Chevolleau, Denis Akiyama and Dan Lett.

The film premiered at the 1997 Toronto International Film Festival on September 6, 1997, but was distributed primarily as a CBC Television film airing in November of that year. The film aired on Showtime and Fox Family Channel in the United States in 1999, following which Whitfield won the NAACP Image Award for Outstanding Performance in a Youth/Children's Series or Special in 2000.

== See also ==
- List of films featuring diabetes
