= The Planet of Junior Brown (novel) =

Book by Virginia Hamilton

- Author: Virginia Hamilton
- Illustrator: Jerry Pinkney
- Language: English
- Genre: Young adult fiction
- Published: 1971 (Macmillan)
- Publication place: USA
- Media type: Print (paperback)
- Pages: 210
- ISBN: 9780027425109
- OCLC: 210830

The Planet of Junior Brown is a 1971 young adult novel by Virginia Hamilton and illustrator Jerry Pinkney. It is about two boys, Junior Brown and Buddy, who with a school janitor, Mr. Pool, construct a mechanical solar system.

== Reception ==
Barbara Bader reviewing The Planet of Junior Brown in Kirkus Reviews wrote "This is not a story to be judged on grounds of probability, but one which makes its own insistent reality; it endures along with its promise long after the story ends." and revisiting the book in Horn Book 40 years later noted that children were not borrowing the book from libraries but wrote "the human drama will prevail and Junior Brown will continue to find susceptible readers, here and there, to whom it will mean a great deal."

The Planet of Junior Brown has also been reviewed by African American Review, and Literature Arts Medicine Database.

== Awards and nominations ==
- 1972–1973 Mark Twain Awards - nomination
- 1971 Horn Book fanfare book
- 1972 Lewis Carroll Shelf Award - winner
- 1972 Newbery Medal - honor

== Adaptations ==
In 1997 a film of the same name, adapted from the novel was released.
