= Patricia Miles Martin =

American children's author

- Born: November 14, 1899; Cherokee, Kansas, USA
- Died: January 2, 1986 (aged 86)
- Occupation: Author
- Writing career
- Pen name: Miska Miles
- Genre: Children's literature

Patricia Miles Martin (November 14, 1899 – January 2, 1986) was an American children's author who wrote American historical fiction, non-fiction, and biographies. She published under her own name as well as the names Miska Miles, Patricia A. Miles, and Jerry Lane. As Miska Miles, she received a Newbery Honor for her book Annie and the Old One in 1972.

== Biography ==
Born in Cherokee, Kansas, she graduated from the University of Wyoming. Following her graduation, she worked for four years as an elementary school teacher in Denver, Colorado and Arminto, Wyoming. Martin and her husband, Edward R. Martin, then moved to California.

In 1957, Martin enrolled in an upholstery class at San Mateo College. When she discovered that the class was full, she sat down instead in a creative writing class where seats were available. During that course, she wrote the manuscript that would become her first published book, Sylvester and the Voice in the Forest (1958). Martin would go on to write more than 100 stories in her career under several pen names. In 2013, a passage from Martin's Otter in the Cove was used in the New York State standardized test in reading in the second year that the tests were aligned to the Common Core.

Martin wrote fiction with characters from a wide range of ethnic communities, picture books for beginning readers, and twelve biographies, for Putnam's "See & Read/Begin to Read Biography Series." Some of her inspiration came from the events that happened in her youth while living on a farm in Kansas and on a Navajo reservation. Stories with Navajo characters, for example, include Annie and the Old One, Gracie and the Biggest Pumpkin and Navajo Pets. She presented a child's view of many social and family struggles. The Washington Post, described Annie and the Old One, the story of a Navajo “girl's love for her grandmother and her struggle to understand the impending death of the old woman," a topic she presented with "gentle restraint."

Martin died in 1986. Her papers are held by the University of Southern Mississippi library, the University of Minnesota library, and University of Wyoming's American Heritage Center.

== Awards and honors ==
Pointed Brush was a New York Herald Tribune Children’s Spring Book Festival Honor book in 1959.

Wharf Rat received a New York Academy of Science Citation in 1973.

Annie and the Old One was an ALA Newbery Medal Honor book for 1972. It also won a Christopher Medal (1972), and received the Brooklyn Museum-Brooklyn Public Library Art Book for Children’s citation (1973). It was nominated for a 1972-1973 Mark Twain Award. It was also made into a short film in 1976.

Fourteen of Martin's books were honored as Junior Literary Guild selections.

== Published books ==
- Sylvester Jones and the Voice in the Forest (1958)
- Happy Piper and the Goat (1960)
- The Little Brown Hen (1960)
- The Pointed Brush (1960)
- Suzu and the Bride Doll (1960)
- Benjie Goes into Business (1961)
- Kickapoo (1961)
- The Raccoon and Mrs. McGinnis (1961)
- Dusty and the Fiddlers (1962)
- The Rice Bowl Pet (1962)
- Show and Tell (1962)
- The Birthday Present (1963)
- Little Two and the Peach Tree (1963)
- See a White Horse (1963)
- Abraham Lincoln (1964)
- Calvin and the Cub Scouts (1964)
- The Greedy One (1964)
- No, No, Rosina (1964)
- Pocahontas (1964)
- Pony in the Schoolhouse (1964)
- The Bony Pony (1965)
- The Broomtail Bronc (1965)
- Jump From Jump (1965)
- Mississippi Possum (1965)
- Daniel Boone (1965)
- Andrew Jackson (1966)
- Rolling the Cheese (1966)
- Jefferson Davis (1966)
- Fox and the Fire (1966)
- Mrs. Crumble & Fire Engine No. 7 (1966)
- Sing, Sailor, Sing (1966)
- Teacher's Pet (1966)
- Dolley Madison (1967)
- Dolls from the Cheyenne (1967)
- Friend of Miguel (1967)
- John Marshall (1967)
- The Pieces of Home (1967)
- Rabbit Garden (1967)
- Trina (1967) -- originally released as Trina's Boxcar
- Grandma's Gun (1968)
- Kumi and the Pearl (1968)
- A Long Ago Christmas (1968)
- One Special Dog (1968)
- Uncle Fonzo's Ford (1968)
- Apricot ABC (1969)
- The Dog and the Boat Boy (1969)
- Jacqueline Kennedy Onassis (1969)
- Nobody's Cat (1969)
- That Cat! 1-2-3 (1969)
- Zachary Taylor (1969)
- Eddie's Bear (1970)
- Eskimos: People of Alaska (1970)
- Gertrude's Pocket (1970)
- Hoagie's Rifle-Gun (1970)
- James Madison (1970)
- Indians: The First Americans (1970)
- Chicanos: Mexicans in the United States (1971)
- Thomas Alva Edison (1971)
- Navajo Pet (1971)
- Annie and the Old One (1971)
- Be Brave, Charlie (1972)
- Two Plays about Foolish People (1972)
- Wharf Rat (1972)
- Gracie and the Biggest Pumpkin (1973)
- Somebody's Dog (1973)
- How Can You Hide an Elephant? (1974)
- In the Zoo (1974) (as Jerry Lane)
- Otter in the Cove (1974)
- Run! (1974) (as Jerry Lane)
- Tree House Town (1974)
- Chicken Forgets (1976)
- Swim, Little Duck (1976)
- Aaron's Door (1977)
- Small Rabbit (1977)
- Beaver Moon (1978)
- Mouse Six and the Happy Birthday (1978)
- Jenny's Cat (1979)
