= The Justice Trilogy =

The Justice Trilogy, also called the Justice Cycle, was a series of young-adult science-fiction books written by Virginia Hamilton. Considered philosophically significant by critics within the field of young adult literature, the series is also notable as one of the first young-adult science fiction novels by a significant African American author.

The series consists of three books:

- Justice and Her Brothers (1978). A young African-American girl finds her idyllic rural summer disturbed by the discovery that both she and her somewhat sinister twin brothers have powerful psychic powers.
- Dustland (1980). The siblings from the first volume, together with a friend, time travel into a strange post-apocalyptic future.
- The Gathering (1981). Justice and her brothers must overcome their sibling rivalries in order to defeat a malevolent entity from the future.
