= M. C. Higgins, the Great =

1974 novel by Virginia Hamilton

- First edition
- Author: Virginia Hamilton
- Language: English
- Genre: Children's novel
- Publisher: Macmillan (US); Hamish Hamilton (UK)
- Publication date: 1974
- Publication place: United States
- Media type: Print (hardcover & paperback)
- Pages: 278 pp
- ISBN: 0027424804
- OCLC: 312852502
- LC Class: PZ7.H1828 Mac

M. C. Higgins, the Great, first published in 1974, is a realistic novel by Virginia Hamilton that won the 1975 Newbery Medal for excellence in American children's literature. It also won the National Book Award for Young People's Literature and the Boston Globe-Horn Book Award; it was the first of only two books to do so (the other being 1998's Holes by Louis Sachar).

M.C. Higgins does a bildungsroman (coming-of-age novel) that covers three eventful days in the life of teenager Mayo Cornelius Higgins. It is set in the Appalachian Mountains on Sarah's Mountain, a fictional mountain in Kentucky, near the Ohio River, that is being encroached upon by a mining company. The book highlights the customs of the hill people, including their traditions of song and superstition. At its core is the reconciliation M.C. must make between tradition and change.

== Reception ==
At the time of the book's publication, Kirkus Reviews said: "Hamilton is at her best here; the soaring but firmly anchored imagery, the slant and music of everyday speech, the rich and engaging characters and warm, tough, wary family relationships, the pervasive awareness of both threat and support connected with the mountain -- all mesh beautifully in theme and structure to create a sense of organic belonging." Author and activist Nikki Giovanni wrote in The New York Times, "'M. C. Higgins, the Great' is not an adorable book, not a lived-happily-ever-after kind of story. It is warm, humane and hopeful and does what every book should do—creates characters with whom we can identify and for whom we care." According to The Horn Book Magazine, "All of the characters have vitality and credibility as well as a unique quality that makes them unforgettable... All of the themes are handled contrapuntally to create a memorable picture of a young boy's growing awareness of himself and of his surroundings." In a retrospective essay about the Newbery Medal-winning books from 1966 to 1975, children's author John Rowe Townsend wrote: "As of this writing, M.C. Higgins, The Great is too large and still too close to be seen whole; the perspective of time is needed to discern its shape and its standing; but I should not be surprised if it emerged as being the nearest thing to a masterpiece to appear on the children's lists in its decade."

According to scholar Jonda C. McNair, M.C. Higgins, the Great also made history by becoming the first book for which an African-American author was granted the Newbery Medal (101).

== Translations and adaptations ==
The book has been translated into many languages, including Japanese and German, and was made into a movie in 1986.

Awards
Preceded by The Slave Dancer	Newbery Medal recipient 1975	Succeeded by The Grey King
