= Precious and the Boo Hag =

Children's book by Patricia C. McKissack and Onawumi Jean Moss

- Author: Patricia McKissack; Onawumi Jean Moss
- Illustrator: Kyrsten Brooker
- Language: English
- Genre: Children's picture book, fairy tale
- Publisher: Atheneum Books
- Publication date: 2005
- Publication place: United States
- Media type: Print (hardback)
- Pages: 32
- ISBN: 9780689851940
- OCLC: 936924705

Precious and the Boo Hag is a children's fairy tale by Patricia C. McKissack and Onawumi Jean Moss with illustrations by Kyrsten Brooker. The story revolves around Precious, a young girl, who is left home, told by her mother to not let "nothing or nobody" into the house. Her brother teasingly warns her about Pruella the Boo Hag who can change her shape and will do "most anything" to get inside. Precious is not sure whether to believe him, but while she is alone the Boo Hag arrives on the back of a storm.

The tricky Boo Hag tries to wheedle her way inside, transforming into a thirsty passerby and then into a neighbor girl, but Precious is able to outwit her. Pruella almost succeeds when she transforms herself into a shiny new penny, but Precious realizes at the last minute that the penny has George Washington's face on it instead of Abraham Lincoln's. As her brother had told her, Pruella "aine too smart".
