= Brown Girl, Brownstones =

1959 novel by Paule Marshall

- Cover of Brown Girl, Brownstones (1959)
- Author: Paule Marshall
- Language: English
- Publisher: Random House
- Publication date: 1959
- Publication place: United States
- Media type: Print
- ISBN: 978-1558614987
- Followed by: Soul Clap Hands and Sing

Brown Girl, Brownstones is the debut novel by the internationally recognized writer Paule Marshall, first published in 1959, and dramatized by CBS Television Workshop in 1960. The story is about Barbadian immigrants in Brooklyn, New York. The book gained further recognition after it was reprinted in 1981 by the Feminist Press.

== Synopsis ==
=== Book 1. A Long Day and a Long Night ===
Ten-year-old Selina Boyce lives in a brownstone in Brooklyn with her Barbadian immigrant family: her mother Silla, father Deighton, and sister Ina. Silla is a strict, no-nonsense woman whose goal is to save enough money to purchase the brownstone they are leasing. Deighton is lackadaisical, impulsive, and he frequently cheats on his wife. His dreams of returning to Barbados and his frivolousness are a source of tension between Silla and him. Deighton inherits a piece of land; Silla wants him to sell it so they can buy the brownstone, but Deighton has fantasies about moving back and building an extravagant house. Suggie Skeete, Miss Mary, and Miss Thompson are a few other characters who appear sporadically; Selina goes to them for companionship and advice.

=== Book 2. Pastorale ===
Book 2 opens with a brief description of Deighton and Silla's drawn-out argument over selling the piece of land, and Selina imagining herself as one of the sleeping children who lived in the brownstone before the Boyces. Selina starts to think about womanhood and growing up. She goes to the park with her friend Beryl, where they have an argument about how babies are born: c-section or vaginal birth. Beryl confides to Selina that she has started menstruating. Selina is confused and somewhat repulsed by the idea, as she believes it will never happen to her. In reality, Selina feels left out and confused by puberty.

=== Book 3. The War ===
World War II is in progress at the start of the third book; this section spans a few years, beginning when Selina is around eleven and ends when she is fifteen. Book 3 is titled "The War" partially in reference to the war, but also in reference to the continuing argument between Silla and Deighton about his piece of land. A group of a few other Bajan women visits Silla in her kitchen while she makes Barbadian cuisine to sell. She vents her frustrations about the land, but she comes with a plan that will get it taken care of. Selina overhears, and Silla threatens to punish her if she tells her father.

Selina searches for someone she can tell about Silla's plans because she wants to protect her father. Deighton, still jobless, begins to devote his time to studying the trumpet. He believes that music will be his next get-rich-quick scheme. Selina tells him about the conversation Silla had with the other Bajan women and her plans to somehow sell the land, but reassures him that it's probably nothing to worry about. She fights with her sister, feeling ignored and unloved. Ina says that no one will ever like her because of her bold and brash personality.

Selina tells Miss Thompson about her fight and her concerns about her mother's plans. Miss Thompson, being a maternal and nurturing person, tries to help by distracting her. She fixes Selina's hair in curls, then Selina heads to her mother's work with the intention of confronting her about her plans to sell the land behind Deighton's back. Silla chastises her for travelling to the part of town by herself at night.

Silla reveals that she has successfully sold Deighton's land for nine hundred dollars. Over the course of a year, Silla forged letters to Deighton's sister and granted his sister the power of attorney to sell the land. Deighton seems to be resigned to this fact, and agrees to take out the money the following day. He is gone the entire day, which raises Silla's suspicions. Deighton comes home with an abundance of frivolous and extravagant gifts. Silla mourns the loss of the money that could have gotten them the brownstone.

The community attends the wedding of ’Gatha Steed’s daughter, which turns out to be an extravagant celebration. Deighton shows up to the reception, but it is clear that everyone know what he’s done, and he is essentially excommunicated. He severely injures his arm while incorrectly using machinery at a factory job, then begins to follow a cultist religion led by a man called Father Peace. Deighton he demands to be called "Brother Boyce", and he renounces his family to be with other followers of Father Peace. Silla calls the authorities to have him deported back to Barbados. The family receives news that Deighton either jumped or fell off the ship that was on its way to Barbados, and he drowned.

=== Book 4. Selina ===
Since her father's death, Selina's grief has removed her even further from the community. She attends a party hosted by her childhood friend, Beryl, where Selina learns about the Association. She realizes that her peers are all conforming to their parents’ wishes rather than deciding their futures for themselves. Selina begins college. Silla owns the brownstone, and she works to get rid of Miss Mary and Suggie. Miss Mary passes away, and Silla is able to evict Suggie on the grounds that her promiscuous behavior seems suspiciously like prostitution. Selina loses two of the people she's closest to in a short span. Convinced Silla's doing it on purpose, she becomes even angrier and more reclusive.

Miss Thompson reveals to Selina how she got the sore on her leg. It was the result of a racist attack while she was in the South, where a man injured her with a shovel. She also encourages her to attend an Association meeting so she can re-connect with her "people" and her culture a bit more and stop feeling so alienated. Selina begrudgingly agrees to go, but she tells the group they are money-hungry, narrow-minded, etc. and their concerns are petty compared to what they have to face in the white world.

Selina meets Clive, a melancholy artist about ten years her senior. He initially seems to share a lot of Selina's personal values, and they begin a secret relationship. Selina joins her school dance team, discovering she has natural talent and enjoys it. Silla finds out about Clive, but Selina lies and says they are just friends. Silla warns Selina about him, saying that he is not the sort of person she should hang around with.

Selina decides to rejoin the Association under the pretense of wanting the scholarship they are offering. She plans to take the money and use it to run away with Clive. Selina dances a sola in a recital and has a racist encounter with one of the other dancer's mother afterwards. Selina goes straight to Clive's, and realizes that he never meant to go away with her. Selina leaves her copy of the key to his apartment and returns home to cry herself to sleep.

Selina wins the Association scholarship, but she declines the award. In private, she tells her mother she never stopped seeing Clive and what she had planned to do with the money. Selina plans to leave school and go to Barbados alone. The novel ends with Selina walking alone and tossing one of the silver bangles she has had since she was a baby towards a set of brownstones that are being torn down for a city project.

== Reviews ==
"Remarkable for its colorful characters, the cadence of its dialogue and its evocation of a still-lingering past." — New York Times Book Review

"Marshall brings to her characters ... an instinctive understanding, a generosity and free humor that combine to form a style remarkable for its courage, its color, and its natural control." — The New Yorker

"An unforgettable novel written with pride and anger, with rebellion and tears." — New York Herald Tribune

== Criticism ==
Trudier Harris in her essay "No Outlet for the Blues: Silla Boyce’s Plight in Brown Girl, Brownstones" highlights the opposing ideals of Selina's mother and father, and the effect of their ideas on their daughter Selina. Harris writes: "Paule Marshall's Brown Girl, Brownstones presents a clash of cultures not only for the young protagonist Selina Boyce, who is torn between her father's love for Barbados and her mother's desire to succeed to the American Dream, but also for Silla Boyce, who has similar conflicts. This strong, bitter, frustrated, disappointed, loving, vindictive woman, who keeps striving in the face of all disappointments, is perhaps one of the most complex black women characters in contemporary American literature". By the end of the novel, however, the author concludes that Silla is unable to change sufficiently to escape her blues: “She has grown in her knowledge of herself and of the actions of the people with whom she identifies, but she has not grown to the point of accepting the changes which should be dictated by such knowledge. She continues to give up something of her humanity by her refusal to change, and that perfect control of one's destiny, that inability to give oneself up to the release of music or of love, is what insures that her state of the blues will never find an outlet".

The tension between the themes of individualism and ethnicity are explored in Martin Japtok's essay "Paule Marshall's Brown Girl, Brownstones: Reconciling Ethnicity and Individualism", which concludes: "The simultaneous assertion of ethnicity and individualism must thus be accomplished through a constructionist conceptualization of ethnicity that allows one to see ethnic solidarity as an original response to an Old World environment that still has validity in the New World, though maybe not the same urgency. […] Selina accepts ethnic communalism while pursuing an individualist agenda, creating a new conceptualization of ethnicity in the process".

Gavin Jones begins his essay "'The Sea Ain’ Got No Back Door': The Problems of Black Consciousness in Paule Marshall's Brown Girl, Brownstones" by quoting Marshall saying that unlike Ralph Ellison’s protagonist in Invisible Man, her own mother and friends "'suffered a triple invisibility, being black, female, and foreigners'". The essay goes on to explore this complex triple-identity. Jones concludes: "Marshall's novel is a radical expression of how the black self, when it exists at the intersections of ethnicity, nationhood, and gender, has its wholeness challenged by alternative and frequently conflicting definitions. Just as the sea in Brown Girl contains contradictory multitudes—it is the sea of female creativity, diasporic consciousness, and African history, yet also the sea of colonial exploitation, industrial decay, and obliteration of the black past—Marshall’s novel as a whole proposes a sense of selfhood which, like a prism, contains many faces, each one refracting at an acute angle of difference".
