= Boo hag =

Mythical creature in Gullah Geechee folklore

A boo hag, also known as a witch hag, old hag, skin hag, or simply hag, is a supernatural being in the folklore of the Gullah-Geechee people of the coastal areas of the U.S. states of North Carolina, South Carolina, Georgia and northern Florida. Boo hags are a locally created, unique contribution to the worldwide folklore of the hag or nightmare, a malevolent entity that "rides" a sleeping person to drain their life force. The distinctive feature of the Gullah-Geechee hag is that it removes its skin to prey on its victims.

== Stories ==
In Gullah folklore, boo hags are similar to vampires. Unlike vampires, they gain sustenance from a person's breath, as opposed to their blood, by riding their victims. Hags who were "witches" sold their souls to the devil and had the power to change into animals and insects and drain their victims' spiritual essence.

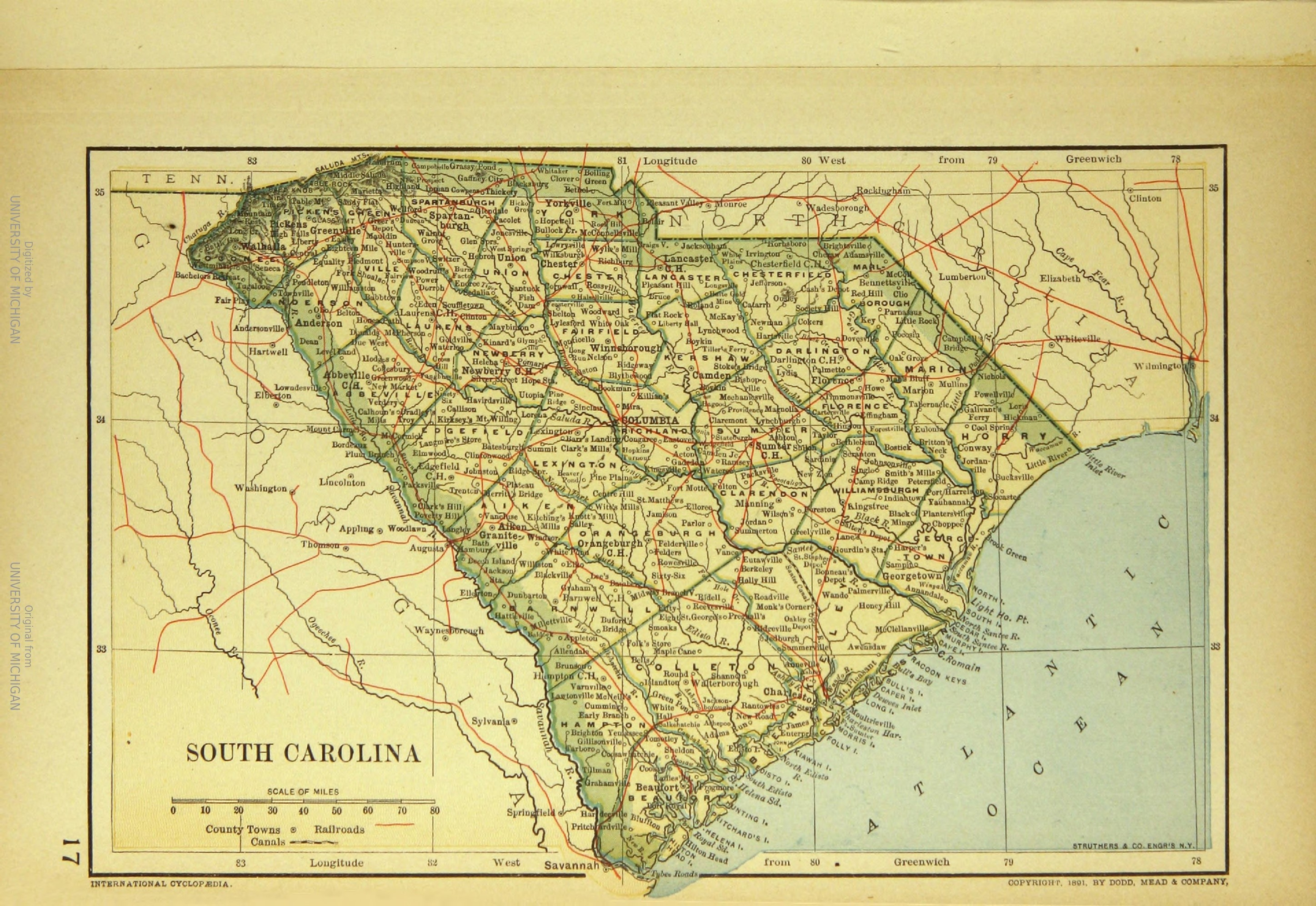
Map of South Carolina, 1894

Jacob Stroyer, born enslaved in South Carolina in 1849, wrote about hags and conjurers on a plantation in South Carolina. According to his autobiography:

The witches among slaves were supposed to have been persons who worked with them every day, and were called old hags or jack lanterns. Those, both men and women, who, when they grew old, looked odd, were supposed to be witches. Sometimes after eating supper the enslaved would gather in each other's cabins which looked over the large openings on the plantation, and when they would see a light at a great distance and saw it open and shut they would say 'there is an old hag,' and if it came from a certain direction where those lived whom they called witches, one would say 'dat looks like old Aunt Susan,' another said 'no, dat look like man hag,' still another 'I tink dat look like ole Uncle Renty.' When the light disappeared, they said that the witch had gotten into the plantation and changed itself into a person, and went around on the place talking with the people like others until those whom it wanted to bewitch went to bed, then it would change itself into a witch again. They claimed that they rode human beings like horses, and the spittle on the side of the cheek when one slept was the bridle that the witch rode with.

If enslaved people did not have a Bible, they sprinkled a mixture of cayenne pepper and salt in the corners and around the room to protect themselves from boo hags. Items or surfaces in haint blue were also used to ward off haints and boo hags.

The Gullah story of the boo hag was passed down through generations of families on the coastal islands of Georgia. Between 1930 and 1940, the Federal Writers Project recorded stories for historical preservation. The WPA Slave Narrative Collection includes tales of boo hags from formerly enslaved people, as recorded in accounts in the book Drums and Shadows (1940).

== Boo hags outside of Gullah culture ==
While boo hags are a product of Gullah culture, the legend has become known on a wider scale. The legend has been used as an object lesson in stranger danger. The legend has also been the subject of song and poetry.

An expression sometimes used in South Carolina is "don't let the hag ride ya." This expression may come from the boo hag legend.

In 2005, a boo hag became a character in a children's book called Precious and the Boo Hag by Patricia C. McKissack and Onawumi Jean Moss. In the story, the boo hag is said to be strange and tricky, and it does anything to get into the house. Precious, the main character, is told by her brother that the boo hag also "...tries to make you disobey yo' mama!" In Black Wings, Grey Skies by Hailey Edwards, a boo hag has gone rogue and starts killing children and the occasional adult. A group of boo hags decides to help the main character bring the villain down.

The book Hush Hush by Remy Wilkins has the antagonists attempting to open a portal in a hurricane in an attempt to summon the boo hag.

Lady Night, a kind of boo hag, appears as a character in Tristan Strong Destroys the World, the second book in the Tristan Strong series.

The 2024 horror film The Geechee Witch: A Boo Hag Story (directed by Jeremiah Kipp) tells the story of a young couple oppressed by a boo hag.

== See also ==
- Baba Yaga
- Black Annis
- Crone
- Hag
- Hoodoo (folk magic)
- Mare (folklore)
- Muma Pădurii
- Onibaba (folklore)
- Precious and the Boo Hag
- The Witch (fairy tale)
