= The People Could Fly: The Picture Book =

Book by Virginia Hamilton

- Author: Virginia Hamilton
- Illustrator: Leo and Diane Dillon
- Language: English
- Subject: Children's literature, Picture book, Slavery in the United States, Folklore
- Published: 2004 (Knopf/Random House)
- Publication place: United States
- Media type: Print (hardback, paperback)
- Pages: 32 (unpaginated)
- ISBN: 9780375824050
- OCLC: 859073829

The People Could Fly: The Picture Book is a 2004 picture book by Virginia Hamilton and illustrated by Leo and Diane Dillon. It is a reissue, by the Dillons, of Hamilton's title story of her 1985 book The People Could Fly: American Black Folktales and is about a group of African-American slaves who call upon old magic to escape their oppression by flying away.

== Reception ==
Booklist, reviewing The People Could Fly, noted "Leo and Diane Dillons' illustrations for the collection were in black and white, but the art here is beautiful full color, in the style of the cover of the collection. The large paintings are magic realism at its finest.." and concluded "This special picture-book story will be told and retold everywhere." The School Library Journal, in a starred review, wrote "The Dillons add much to savor in this elegant picture-book rendering. .. The book is a lovely tribute to Hamilton."

The People Could Fly has also been reviewed by Publishers Weekly, and Kirkus Reviews.

It was awarded a 2005 Coretta Scott King Award illustrator honor, and was a 2005 CCBC Choices book.
