= Bruh Rabbit and the Tar Baby Girl =

Book by Virginia Hamilton

- Author: Virginia Hamilton
- Illustrator: James Ransome
- Language: English
- Subject: Children's literature, picture book, folklore
- Published: 2003 (Blue Sky Press)
- Publication place: United States
- Media type: Print (hardback, paperback)
- Pages: 32 (unpaginated)
- ISBN: 9780590473767
- OCLC: 50859107

Bruh Rabbit and the Tar Baby Girl is a 2003 picture book by Virginia Hamilton and illustrated by James Ransome. It is a retelling by Hamilton, in the Gullah dialect, of the classic story of Bruh Rabbit outwitting Bruh Wolf.

== Reception ==
Booklist, in a review of Bruh Rabbit and the Tar Baby Girl, wrote "In this version of the beloved Tar Baby trickster story, she drew on Gullah folklore from the Sea Islands of South Carolina. Her rhythmic, immediate version is well matched by Ransome's paintings, both cozy and exciting, which extend the fun with beautiful farmland scenes at dayclean (dawn) and daylean (evening) picturing the wily rabbit thief in human clothes repeatedly outwitting the wolf." and the School Library Journal described it as "meticulously paced, lyrical, hilarious, and a joy to read aloud" with "lush watercolors [that] suit the story perfectly".

Bruh Rabbit and the Tar Baby Girl has also been reviewed by The Horn Book Magazine, Kirkus Reviews, and Publishers Weekly, and the Florida Media Quarterly.

It is a 2004 ALA Notable Book for children, and a 2004 CCBC Choices book.
