= Wee Winnie Witch's Skinny =

Book by Virginia Hamilton

Wee Winnie Witch's Skinny: An Original Scare Tale for Halloween
- Author: Virginia Hamilton
- Illustrator: Barry Moser
- Language: English
- Subject: Children's literature, Picture book, American Folklore
- Published: 2004 (Blue Sky Press)
- Publication place: United States
- Media type: Print (hardback, paperback)
- Pages: 32 (unpaginated)
- ISBN: 9780590288804
- OCLC: 861755682

Wee Winnie Witch's Skinny: An Original African American Scare Tale is a 2004 picture book by Virginia Hamilton and illustrated by Barry Moser. It is about a witch, Wee Winnie, who terrifies Uncle Big Anthony but is then killed by Mamma Granny.

== Reception ==
Booklist, reviewing Wee Winnie Witch's Skinny, wrote "This original scare tale, which may be her creepiest, is a wonderful horror story that draws on traditional beliefs about witches hanging up their skins and riding people using braided hair as a bridle. Moser's framed, colored wood engravings do a great job of bringing the wild, shivery adventure close to home, their black backgrounds and strong lines lit with garish Halloween images in shades of green and red." The School Library Journal recommended that "This tale is admirably suited to Halloween telling, or for any time that shivers are in order."

The Horn Book Magazine drew comparisons with Zora Neale Hurston's The Skull Talks Back (HarperCollins, 2004) and wrote that some of the illustrations "reflect a reality of historical suffering" and "casts an eerie suggestion of lynching" It found that "Visually and verbally, this is dark art on dark art."

Wee Winnie Witch's Skinny has also been reviewed by Publishers Weekly, and Kirkus Reviews.
