= Arilla Sun Down =

1976 children's novel by Virginia Hamilton

- First edition
- Author: Virginia Hamilton
- Language: English
- Subject: Children's literature
- Published: 1976
- Publisher: Greenwillow Books (US); Hamish Hamilton (UK)
- Publication place: United States
- Media type: Print (hardback, paperback)
- Pages: 248 (unpaginated)
- ISBN: 9780688800581
- OCLC: 2164959

Arilla Sun Down is a 1976 children's novel by Virginia Hamilton and is about the life experiences of Arilla, a young girl of African American and American Indian parentage.

== Reception ==
A review of Arilla Sun Down in The Best in Children's Books: The University of Chicago Guide to Children's Literature, 1973-78 stated "Hamilton is a genius with words; once accustomed to the pattern, the reader hears the singing quality. What is outstanding in the story is the depth and nuance of the author's perception of the young adolescent, the brilliant characterization, and the dramatic impact of some of the episodes." and Margaret Bernice Smith Bristow, writing about Hamilton in The Concise Oxford Companion to African American Literature, found "Her use of unconventional stream of consciousness and language in Arilla Sun Down (1976) is also noteworthy."

Arilla Sun Down has also been reviewed by Kirkus Reviews, Children's Literature Association Quarterly, the English Journal, and the School Library Journal.
