= Barry Moser =

American illustrator

- Born: 1940 (age 85–86); Chattanooga, Tennessee, U.S.
- Education: Baylor School, Auburn University, University of Tennessee at Chattanooga, University of Massachusetts Amherst
- Occupations: illustrator, printmaker, educator, printing press owner

Barry Moser (born 1940) is an American visual artist and educator, known as a printmaker specializing in wood engravings, and an illustrator of numerous works of literature. He is also the owner and operator of the Pennyroyal Press, an engraving and small book publisher founded in 1970.

== Early life and education ==
Moser was born in 1940 in Chattanooga, Tennessee. Moser studied at the Baylor School, Auburn University, and the University of Tennessee at Chattanooga, and did graduate work at the University of Massachusetts Amherst. He studied printmaking with Leonard Baskin.

== Career ==
Moser is known for his illustrations for Lewis Carroll's Alice's Adventures in Wonderland and Through the Looking-Glass, each of which consisted of more than a hundred prints, and the former of which won him the National Book Award for design and illustration in 1983. He has illustrated nearly 300 other works as well, including portions of the Time Life book series The Enchanted World, A River Runs Through It, and Moby-Dick. He published his own illustrated Bible edition, and he illustrated the Allen Mandelbaum translation of Dante's Inferno, published in 1980 as Inferno: First Book of the Divine Comedy.

He has been on the faculty of the Department of Illustration Studies at the Rhode Island School of Design and was also on the faculty of the Williston Northampton School for many years. He was Professor in Residence and Printer to the College at Smith College until his retirement in May 2025. Barry Moser also teaches Life Drawing at the Glen East Workshop, held in summers in the Pioneer Valley of Massachusetts.

His works have been displayed in such places as the British Museum, the Metropolitan Museum, Harvard University, and the Library of Congress.

In 2007 the Smithsonian Art Collectors Program commissioned Moser to create a print for their Small Treasures series, the sales of which benefit educational and cultural programs through the Smithsonian Associates. The resulting relief engraving, An Old Chestnut is on display in the S. Dillon Ripley Center in the National Mall.

== Bibliography ==
=== Art books ===
- The Mother Goose Collection (silkscreen art book, limited edition, 300 copies). Maurice Sendak (illustrator), Barry Moser (illustrator), Seymour Chwast (illustrator), Daniel Pelvin (illustrator), Guy Billout (illustrator), Chris Van Allsburg (illustrator). New York City, NY: Serigrafica. 1990.

=== Children's books ===
- Hamilton, Virginia (1988). In the Beginning: Creation Stories From Around the World. Barry Moser (illustrator). New York City, NY: Harcourt Brace. ISBN 9780152387426.
- Kesey, Ken (1990). Little Tricker the Squirrel Meets Big Double the Bear. Barry Moser (illustrator). Viking Juvenile. ISBN 978-0670811366.
- And Still the Turtle Watched (1991)
- Polly Vaughn: A Traditional British Ballad (1992)
- Speak!: Children's Book Illustrators Brag about their Dogs (1993)
- The Farm Summer 1942 (1994)
- I Am the Dog, I Am the Cat (1994)
- Vaughan, Marcia (1995). Whistling Dixie. Barry Moser (illustrator). HarperCollins Children's Books. ISBN 978-0060210304.
- The Pageant (1995)
- Our New Puppy (1996)
- Hamilton, Virginia (1996). When Birds Could Talk and Bats Could Sing. Barry Moser (illustrator). Blue Sky Press. ISBN 9780590473729.
- Parks, Van Dyke; Harris, Joel Chandler (1997). Jump, Again! The Further Adventures of Brer Rabbit. Barry Moser (illustrator). Harcourt Children's Books. ISBN 978-0152015596.
- A Ring of Tricksters: Animal Tales from America, the West Indies, and Africa (1997)
- Dippers (1997)
- Great Ghost Stories (1998)
- Dogs of Myth: Tales from Around the World (1999)
- Earthquack! (2002)
- That Summer (2002)
- Voices of Ancient Egypt (2003)
- Hummingbird Nest: A Journal of Poems (2004)
- Wee Winnie Witch's Skinny: An Original African American Scare Tale (2004)
- The Three Silly Billies (2005)
- A Horse Named Funny Cide (2006)
- Literary Genius: 25 Classic Writers Who Define English & American Literature (2007)
- Jack London's Dog (2008)
- Hogwood Steps Out: A Good, Good Pig Story (2008)
- Lousy Rotten Stinkin' Grapes (2009)
- The Cheshire Cheese Cat: A Dickens of a Tale (2011)
- Oh, Harry! (2011)
- Franklin and Winston: A Christmas That Changed the World (2011)
- Cat Talk (2013)
- We Were Brothers (2015)

=== Novels, fairy tales ===
- Frankenstein (1984)
- The Adventures of Tom Sawyer (1989)
- A River Runs Through It (1989)
- Beauty and the Beast (1992)
- The Adventures of Sherlock Holmes (1992)
- First Love: A Gothic Tale (1996)
- Billy Budd, Sailor (2025)
