= Paule Marshall =

American writer (1929–2019)

- Born: Valenza Pauline Burke; April 9, 1929; Brooklyn, New York City, U.S.
- Died: August 12, 2019 (aged 90); Richmond, Virginia, U.S.
- Education: Hunter College, City University of New York; Brooklyn College
- Occupation: Writer
- Notable work: Brown Girl, Brownstones (1959); The Chosen Place, the Timeless People (1969); Praisesong for the Widow (1983)
- Spouse(s): Kenneth Marshall (married 1950; divorced 1963; Nourry Menard (married 1970s)

Paule Marshall (April 9, 1929 – August 12, 2019) was an American writer, best known for her 1959 debut novel Brown Girl, Brownstones. In 1992, at the age of 63, Marshall was awarded a MacArthur Fellowship grant.

== Life and career ==
Marshall was born Valenza Pauline Burke in Brooklyn, New York. to Adriana Viola Clement Burke and Sam Burke on April 9, 1929. Marshall's father had migrated from the Caribbean island of Barbados to New York in 1919 and, during her childhood, deserted the family to join a quasi-religious cult, leaving his wife to raise their children by herself. Marshall wrote about how her career was inspired by observing her mother's relationship to language: "It served as therapy, the cheapest kind available to my mother and her friends. It restored them to a sense of themselves and reaffirmed their self-worth. Through language they were able to overcome the humiliations of the work day. Confronted by a world they could not encompass, they took refuge in language." Smitten with the poet Paul Laurence Dunbar, Marshall changed her given name from Pauline to Paule (with a silent e) when she was 12 or 13 years old.

She attended Bushwick High School and subsequently enrolled in Hunter College, City University of New York, with plans of becoming a social worker. She took ill during college and took a year off, during which time she decided to major in English Literature, eventually earning her Bachelor of Arts degree at Brooklyn College in 1953 and her master's degree at Hunter College in 1955. After graduating from college, Marshall wrote for Our World, the acclaimed nationally distributed magazine edited for African-American readers, which she credited with teaching her discipline in writing and eventually aiding her in writing her first novel, Brown Girl, Brownstones. In 1950, she married psychologist Kenneth Marshall; they divorced in 1963. In the 1970s, she married Nourry Menard, a Haitian businessman.

Early in her career, she wrote poetry, but later returned to prose, her debut novel being published in 1959. Brown Girl, Brownstones tells the story of Selina Boyce, a girl growing up in a small black immigrant community. Selina is caught between her mother, who wants to conform to the ideals of her new home and make the American dream come true, and her father, who longs to go back to Barbados. The dominant themes in the novel – travel, migration, psychic fracture and striving for wholeness – are important structuring elements in her later works as well.

In 1961 Marshall received a Guggenheim Fellowship and published Soul Clap Hands and Sing, a collection of four novellas that won her the National Institute of Arts Award. In 1965, Langston Hughes chose her to accompany him on a State Department-sponsored world tour during which they both read their work. This was a boon to her career. In 1969 she published the novel The Chosen Place, the Timeless People (1969), which the New York Times Book Review called "one of the four or five most impressive novels ever written by a black American."

Her next novel, Praisesong for the Widow (1983), won the Before Columbus Foundation American Book Award in 1984. In 2021, the book was reissued by McSweeney's, as part of their "Of the Diaspora" series highlighting important works in Black literature, with an introduction by Opal Palmer Adisa. Julie Dash, as Houston Baker said while interviewing the writer and director of the influential film Daughters of the Dust (1991), used a "resonant passage" from Praisesong. Dash described having already written a line for a character standing at the banks of Ibo Landing, and then discovering a “glorious” line in Marshall’s novel that she used instead.

Marshall taught at Virginia Commonwealth University, the University of California, Berkeley, the Iowa Writers' Workshop, and Yale University, before holding the Helen Gould Sheppard Chair of Literature and Culture at New York University. In 1993 she received an honorary L.H.D. from Bates College. She lived in Richmond, Virginia.

She was a 1992 MacArthur Fellow and a winner of the Dos Passos Prize for Literature. She was designated as a Literary Lion by the New York Public Library in 1994.

Marshall was inducted into the Celebrity Path at the Brooklyn Botanic Garden in 2001.

Her memoir, Triangular Road, was published in 2009.

In 2010, Paule Marshall won a Lifetime Achievement Award from the Anisfield-Wolf Book Awards. She died in Richmond, Virginia on August 12, 2019, having had dementia in her later years. A biography by Mary Helen Washington, was published by Yale University Press in February of 2026.

== Works ==
- Brown Girl, Brownstones (Random House, 1959; The Feminist Press, 1981)
- Soul Clap Hands and Sing (four short novels; Atheneum, 1961)
- The Chosen Place, the Timeless People (Harcourt, 1969)
- Reena and Other Stories (The Feminist Press at CUNY, 1983)
- Praisesong for the Widow (Putnam, 1983) (Reissued 2021, McSweeney's; hardcover ISBN 978-1-952-11904-0), with an introduction by Opal Palmer Adisa.)
- Merle: A Novella, and Other Stories (Virago Press, 1985)
- Daughters (Atheneum, 1991)
- The Fisher King: A Novel (2001)
- Triangular Road: A Memoir (Basic Civitas Books, 2009)

== Quote ==
"I realise that it is fashionable now to dismiss the traditional novel as something of an anachronism, but to me it is still a vital form. Not only does it allow for the kind of full-blown, richly detailed writing that I love… but it permits me to operate on many levels and to explore both the inner state of my characters as well as the worlds beyond them."
