= Praisesong for the Widow =

1983 novel by Paule Marshall

- Author: Paule Marshall
- Language: English
- Genre: Social realism novel
- Publisher: Plume, Penguin Group
- Publication date: February 14, 1983
- Publication place: United States
- Media type: Print (hardback & paperback)
- Pages: 256 pp
- ISBN: 0-399-12754-2 (hardcover) (1st edition)
- OCLC: 8626833
- Dewey Decimal: 813/.54 19
- LC Class: PS3563.A7223 P7 1983

Praisesong for the Widow is a 1983 novel by Paule Marshall that takes place in the mid-1970s, chronicling the life of Avey Johnson, a 64-year-old African-American widow on a physical and emotional journey in the Caribbean island of Carriacou. Throughout the novel, there are many flashbacks to Avey's earlier life experiences with her late husband, Jerome Johnson, as well as childhood events that reconnect her with her lost cultural roots. The book was reissued in 2021, part of McSweeney's "Of the Diaspora" series highlighting important works in Black literature.

== Explanation of the title ==
There is a reference here to the African heritage of Avey Johnson, to which she reconnects during the course of the novel. Through the use of song and remembrances of the past, Avey is able to come to terms with the death of her husband.

== Plot summary ==
The opening begins with Avey "Avatara" Johnson packing her bags aboard her 17-day cruise on the Bianca Pride, during the late 1970s. The reason for her sudden departure began three nights before, when she had a dream about her great-aunt Cuney and a disturbing encounter in the Versailles dining-room with a peach parfait. Her first since the 1960s, the dream consists of Avey's aunt in Tatem attempting to convince Avey to follow her down the road in Tatem, South Carolina, a childhood vacation spot. When Avey resists, the two have a physical brawl. The next morning, Avey wants nothing more than to be alone, and yet cannot get away from anyone on the cruise ship, no matter where she goes. At this point, she makes the decision to leave the ship. The next morning, she packs her bags and leaves to the next port-of-call, which is the island of Grenada. On Grenada, the atmosphere seems to be festive, as people dressed in bright clothing, carrying packages, are getting onto boats. Confused, Avey Johnson is later informed by her taxi driver that it is the annual excursion to Carriacou, a nearby island. At the hotel, the sick feeling in Avey's stomach returns, and Avey spends her last moments of consciousness painfully reminiscing about her relationship with her late husband, Jerome "Jay" Johnson, and for the first time in four years, she mourns his loss.

Avey wakes up the next day in the home of Rosalie Parvay, the widow daughter of Lebert Joseph. Along with Milda the maid, Rosalie washes Avey and feeds her a typical Carriacou breakfast, during which Lebert enters the home to see how Avey is feeling. Despite her sickness of the previous day, Avey decides to go to the dances that will take place that night.

That night, Avey, Rosalie, Milda, and Lebert all go to the "Big Drum" dances. There, Avey is at first happy merely to be a bystander and watch Lebert and other elders of the community sing and dance for the ancestors. However, by the end of the night, Avey is dancing along with the other people celebrating their cultural roots to Africa. The next morning, Avey leaves on a plane back to New York, but decides to sell her home that she no longer needs and move to Tatem, in the home left for her by aunt Cuney. There, she will demand that her grandchildren come to see her, so that she may teach them about their heritage, like Cuney did for her.

== Characters ==
Avey "Avatara" Johnson: Around 64 years of age, Avey is an African-American widow living in North White Plains, New York. She raised three girls in both Brooklyn and North White Plains, moving from the apartment when she and her late husband, Jerome "Jay" Johnson, changed economic status twenty years previously. She was raised in Harlem and has three brothers.

Marion Johnson: The youngest of Avey's three girls, Marion was the only child to oppose Avey's cruise. Seemingly more aware of her cultural roots, Marion teaches in a small community school and helps volunteer at a church in Harlem.

Annawilda: Avey and Jerome's middle child, Annawilda is a bright individual and through academic success is now an intern at Meharry Hospital. She thinks that Avey's cruise with the other women is a good vacation idea, and supports her mother.

Sis: Sis is the oldest daughter. Sis is helpful to Avery during the hard and easy times. Sis lives with Avery in the Harlem apartment and helps by caring for her sisters. Sis is married with two children and hopes the cruise will take Avey's mind off Jerome Johnson's death.

Jerome "Jay" Johnson: Avey's husband of many years, Jerome died four years before the beginning of the novel. During their married life, Jerome worked as a stock boy in a department store, in addition to later getting jobs as a vacuum cleaner salesman, and a certified accountant, through going back to school.

Thomasina Moore: A longtime friend of Avey and her traveling companion, Thomasina is widow as well, but has no children. She becomes very upset when she learns that Avey is leaving the cruise early, showing her typical short temper and outspokenness.

Clarice: Avey's other cruise ship partner, Clarice is much more passive in her reaction to Avey's leaving the ship. An overweight divorcee, Clarice is the youngest of the three African-American friends and has one son.

Lebert Joseph: The owner of the small rum shop on Grenada which Avey enters on the beach, Lebert is a very old man with one short, gimp leg. He has a daughter named Rosalie Parvay who lives on Carriacou, and many grandchildren who live in the states. He is proud to direct his African heritage to the Chamba tribe, for which he knows the ritual song and dance.

Rosalie Parvay: The widow daughter of Lebert Joseph, Rosalie lives on Carriacou with her maid, Milda.

Aunt Cuney: A major figure in the childhood of Avey, Aunt Cuney is a woman who tells stories to Avey about African slaves when Avey visits her in Tatem, South Carolina, as a child.

== Major themes ==
The cultural significance of language: Avey's inability to speak Patois widens the barrier between her and the out-islanders going on the excursion. The cab driver asserts that those venturing to Carriacou only talk in the Creole dialect one weekend a year and the rest of the time speak in the “King's English” (76). The language, despite being virtually useless in the daily lives of the out-islanders, enforces the deep ties they have to their ancestral past. Avey's lack of comprehension in Patois ultimately magnifies her cultural ineptness and her isolation from those around her. However friendly the out-islanders may be, she feels uncomfortable and awkward around them as their cultural traditions, traditions that should be hers as well, only confuse her.

Dance: Throughout the novel, dancing becomes a spiritually freeing act for Avey. Not only does Avey recall meeting her late husband at a dance, but also reminisces with great fondness about the nights the couple spent unwinding from their long days by dancing in their apartment on Halsey Street. On these nights, she recollects feeling “centered and sustained... restored to her proper axis” (254). Dance clearly plays an important part in her life even before her journey to Carriacou as Avey uses it to temporarily forget her daily troubles and place things into perspective.

Materialism and the loss of identity: Both Avey and Jay fall victim to the pitfalls of financial success. Their happiness suffers at the price of material fulfillment, as Jay regards their “[l]ove like a burden he want[s] to get rid of” (129). In the midst of the 120.........-year struggle to escape from the poverty on Halsey Street, his and Avey's romantic relationship dissolves and their emotional detachment increases. Although Jay gives Avey all of the worldly comforts afforded to the upper-middle class, he neglects her sexual needs and companionship. Ultimately, Jay's work and determination to leave their Brooklyn neighborhood consumes his person, allowing him and Avey little time to rekindle their lost love.

The dream Avey has at the beginning of the book that compels her to cut her cruise short further captures the perils of living a shallow, object-oriented life. Instead of venturing to the Ibo Landing with her Great Aunt Cuney like she did as a child, Avey, dressed in a new suit and fine mink, scoffs at the prospect and violently retaliates against her Aunt when she persists on taking Avey as a grown woman. As the passion in her marriage disintegrates, so too does her connection with the spiritual world. The dream reflects her inability to understand the importance of her ancestry as a consequence of the high value she places on superfluous goods. Despite her immense sacrifice to eke out a better life for her and her family, Avey gradually loses herself and her priorities in the process.

The Middle Passage: During Avey's boat ride from Grenada to Carriacou, she slips into a dream about the middle passage, one her ancestors may have taken long ago. Through the remembrance of the past hardships of the slaves, Avey is able to alleviate her own, more temporary suffering aboard the ship: "Their suffering- the depth of it, the weight if it in the cramped space- made hers of no consequence." (209) Avey would have learned about the middle passage, or the middle leg of African slaves' journey to the Americas, from her great-aunt Cuney. As a child, Cuney showed Avey where the Ibos would have landed from the ships in Tatem, South Carolina, and then where they were sold after arriving. Through this insight to the past, Avey is able to gain strength that she had lacked when not remembering her African heritage.

=== Structure and formal considerations ===
The novel itself is split up into four different parts..0.: Runagate, Sleeper's Wake, Lave Tete, and The Beg Pardon. These names refer to the events chronicled in these chapters. Runagate refers to Avey Johnson's breaking away from the other members of her cruise ship party and heading to the island of Grenada. In Sleeper's Wake, Avey recalls during her tear-sodden dreams the memories of her late husband. Lave Tete makes reference to the actual washing and cleansing of Avey Johnson in the text, as well as a sort of spiritual renewal which accompanies it. In the Beg Pardon, Avey Johnson is able to come to terms with her African heritage through the ritualistic dancing and music, the actual "Beg Pardon" dance, in addition to inner forgiveness for any mistakes her memories may shown her.

The main formal consideration of the novel is its constant flashbacks to the past of Avey Johnson. Throughout the text, Avey uses the flashbacks to compare present situations to the events of her memory. For example, all the information gained about Avey and Jerome Johnson's life together is through the use of memories that come to Avey's mind as she finally mourns the loss of her late husband in the hotel room in Grenada.

The narration throughout the text comes from a third-person, omniscient only in character of Avey Johnson, where the reader is able to see into her mind, but this does not apply to the other characters in the novel. The syntax of the novel uses many dashes to draw the reader's attention to the words within the sentence, in order to write an aside to the reader. Creole and French Patois are used in the novel. To demonstrate the language barrier between the characters and the book, as well as between the reader and the story. The character of Avey Johnson is equally confused as the reader in these situations.

== Literary significance and reception ==
"The praisong is performed by a group of dancing natives on the tiny island of Carriacou, and how Avey Johnson comes to be there...is a story both convincing and eerily dreamlike." - Anne Tyler, The New York Herald

"Praisesong is not only about alienation and reaffirmation, but also about the role and the importance of Black women as transmitters and preservers of culture, identity, and heritage." - Thelma Ravell-Pinto, Journal of Black Studies, 1987

"It doesn't take a reader long to figure out where Paule Marshall is headed in her ultimately successful new novel, Praisesong for the Widow." - Christopher Lehmann-Haupt, The New York Times, 1983.

== Allusions and references ==
=== Allusions to other works ===
The author makes use of many quotations throughout the text in order to bring to the attention of the reader the way in which Avey Johnson was under the influence of many generations of material.

- The Woman at the Washington Zoo, by Randall Jarrell
- "Leroy" by Amiri Baraka from Black Magic Poetry
- "Little Brown Baby" by Paul Laurence Dunbar
- A song called "The Big Drum Dance of Carriacou", annotated by Dr. Andrew C. Pearse
- "Children of the Poor" by Gwendolyn Brooks
- "I, Too" and "The Negro Speaks of Rivers" by Langston Hughes
- "Runagate Runagate" by Robert Hayden
- "Romance in the Dark", music and lyrics by Lil Green
- Lyrics of "Four Women", by Nina Simone
- "Good Times" by Lucille Clifton
- "The Creation" by James Weldon Johnson
- Lyrics from "Jelly Belly Blues", by Earl Hines and Billy Eckstine

=== Allusions to actual history, geography and current science ===
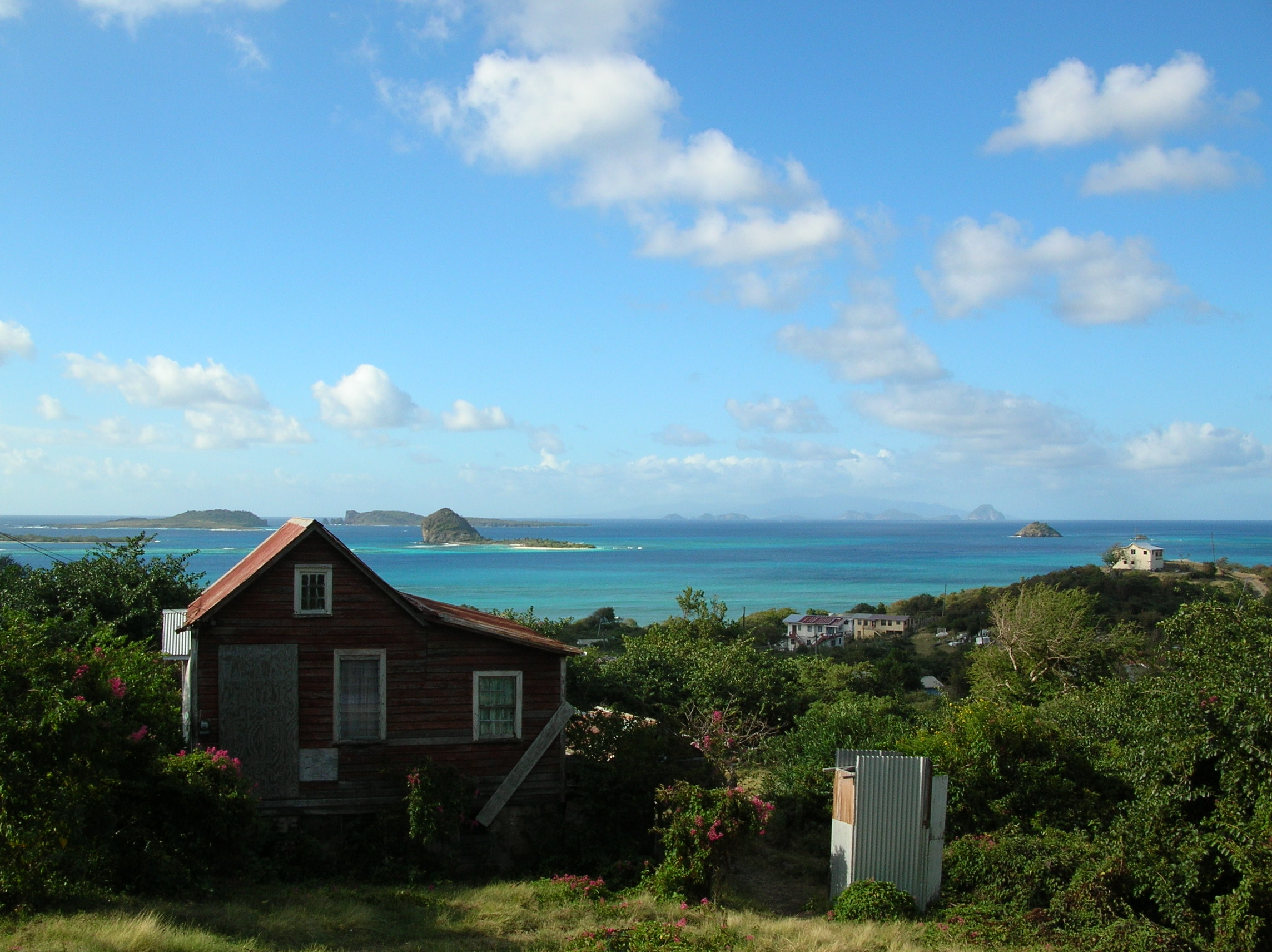
On the island of Grenada

The first scene takes place aboard the Bianca Pride, a cruise ship, somewhere in the Caribbean. The rest of the chronological events of the novel take place on the islands of Grenada and Carriacou. The islands of Grenada and Carriacou that are mentioned in the novel are actual places in the Caribbean. Grenada has a population of 100,000 and English and French patois are spoken there, as the island was discovered by Christopher Columbus, and thereafter colonized by both the French and the British. Carriacou is 16 miles off the coast of Grenada, and has a population of 6,000 people.]

The flashbacks during the novel reference Tatem, South Carolina, where Avey's great-aunt Cuney lives. When referring to her married life, Avey is living in Harlem, New York, in a poor, mostly African-American neighborhood, and more specifically on Hasley Street in a small apartment. Later, the family moves to a larger home in North White Plains, where Avey lives at the beginning of the novel.

The author also alludes to the Jim Crow laws that were in standard practice in the Southern United States from 1876 to around 1965. In "Praisesong for the Widow", Avey and Jerome Johnson are forced to move to the back of the bus in traveling south to South Carolina, and make reference to doing this as a result of the Jim Crow laws. The entire civil rights era of the 1960s in referenced to throughout the novel in the actions of Avey 's youngest daughter, Marion. Marion is referenced to as calling from a protest rally in Washington D.C., of which there were many of during this time.

== Awards and nominations ==
Praisesong for the Widow received the Before Columbus Foundation American Book Award in 1983.

== Publication history ==
1983, United States, New York: Putnam; Plume, Penguin Books, paperback ISBN 0-452-26711-0. Reissued 2021, United States, San Francisco: McSweeney's; hardcover ISBN 978-1-952-11904-0), with an introduction by Opal Palmer Adisa.

== Further reading, sources, external links ==
- Dorothy L. Denniston, "Paule Marshall (born 1929)", Georgetown University.
- Ann Folwell Stanford, "Praisesong for the Widow", Literature, Arts, and Medicine Database, 2006.
- Lehmann-Haupt, Christopher (February 1, 1983). "Critique of the book". The New York Times.
- Courtney Thorsson, "Dancing up a Nation: Paule Marshall's Praisesong for the Widow". Callaloo, Volume 30, Number 2, Spring 2007, pp. 644–652.
- Book review, Journal of Black Studies, June 1987, 17: 509–511.
- Olmsted, Jane. "The Pull to Memory and the Language of Place in Paule Marshall's 'The Chosen Place, the Timeless People' and 'Praisesong for the Widow'". African American Review. 31 (2). Archived from the original on June 5, 2011 – via Questia.
- Paulette Brown-Hinds, "In the Spirit: Dance as Healing Ritual in Paule Marshall's 'Praisesong for the Widow'", Religion & Literature, Vol. 27, No. 1, Giving Testimony: African-American Spirituality and Literature (Spring 1995), pp. 107–117.
