= Annie Christmas =

Louisiana folklore character

Annie Christmas or flatboat Annie is a character in the folklore and tall tales of Louisiana, described as a 7 feet (2.1 m) tall, supernaturally strong African-American woman keelboat captain. She has been described as a female counterpart of the John Henry character, another supernaturally strong African American folklore character. Like John Henry, the character may have been based on a real person. Stories of Annie Christmas have been included in several collections of folktales from the Southern United States.

In his book The Gangs of New Orleans, Herbert Asbury states that Annie Christmas was originally a white New Orleans woman and white folk hero, who "became a demigod among the Negroes" who presented her as black. He writes that "In the white version of the Annie Christmas saga, she was murdered in a New Orleans gambling-house, but Negro tradition permits no such commonplace end. The Negroes have it that she killed herself for love."

The stories describe how she defies traditional gender hierarchies and the rules and expectations for female behavior. She drinks exorbitant amounts of liquor and dominates men who challenge her authority. She wears a pearl necklace, and each pearl represents the defeat of someone who has unsuccessfully challenged her. Though unmarried, she has twelve sons who work as her crewmen on the keelboat. In one tale of her death she was attacked by 100 men who shot and stabbed her.

The novel 1993: Free Enterprise: A Novel of Mary Ellen Pleasant by Jamaican Author Michelle Cliff includes a character named Annie Christmas, probably inspired by the folktale character.

Andrew Lloyd Webber and Jim Steinman wrote an Annie Christmas song for their play Whistle Down the Wind (1996).
