= Annie and the Old One =

1971 children's fiction book

- Author: Miska Miles
- Illustrator: Peter Parnall
- Language: English
- Genre: Children's Literature, Fiction
- Published: 1971
- Publication place: United States

Annie and the Old One is a 1971 children's fiction book written by American author Miska Miles and illustrated by American artist Peter Parnall. In 1972 the book received the Newbery Medal Honor Book award. The novel uses Native American culture to explore themes of family death, dealing with grief, and family relationships.

== Plot ==
A young Native American girl, Annie, is willing to do anything to stop her mother from finishing a rug after hearing from her grandmother that she will die when the rug is finished. Annie misbehaves in school to make her parents come speak to the teacher, but the teacher does not call for her mother. Then, Annie let the sheep escape, so her mother and father would spend the morning chasing after the sheep. Her last attempt to distract her mother from finishing the rug is to pull out the strands of yarn, one by one. The grandmother catches her and explains that death is part of life, inevitable, and nothing to fear or regret.

== Teaching and themes ==
The novel focuses on dealing with death, the grief that comes with family death, and family relationships. Teaching resources recommend using the book to teach elementary children how to deal with grief and manage feelings.

== Reception ==
Publishers Weekly described the book as effectively dealing with "a difficult challenge" for children and said that the illustrations "reflect the dignity of the text."
