= Drylongso (Hamilton book) =

1992 children's book by Virginia Hamilton

- First edition
- Author: Virginia Hamilton
- Illustrator: Jerry Pinkney
- Language: English
- Genre: Children's literature, picture book
- Published: 1992 (Harcourt Brace Jovanovich)/Houghton Mifflin Harcourt
- Publication place: United States
- Media type: Print (hardback)
- Pages: 54
- ISBN: 9780152242411
- OCLC: 24217134

Drylongso is a 1992 children's book by Virginia Hamilton and illustrator Jerry Pinkney. It is about a farming family who is experiencing a drought and takes in a stranger.

== Reception ==
School Library Journal, in a review of Drylongso, noted: "As in many of her other works of fiction, Hamilton combines myth and realism to create a poignant, powerful tale. .. Pinkney's illustrations are exquisite, expressive, and perfectly in tune with the tone and spirit of the text." and concluded "Despite the occasional seams, this is a fine book." Booklist wrote: "In an understated story of drought and hard times and longing for rain, a great writer and a great artist have pared down their rich, exuberant styles to something quieter but no less intense." and Publishers Weekly called it a "thoroughly captivating story firmly rooted in the folktale tradition."

Drylongso has also been reviewed by Kirkus Reviews, The Horn Book Magazine, and the Smithsonian.
