= Legends of Myrtles Plantation =

Associated with a former plantation in Louisiana, U.S.

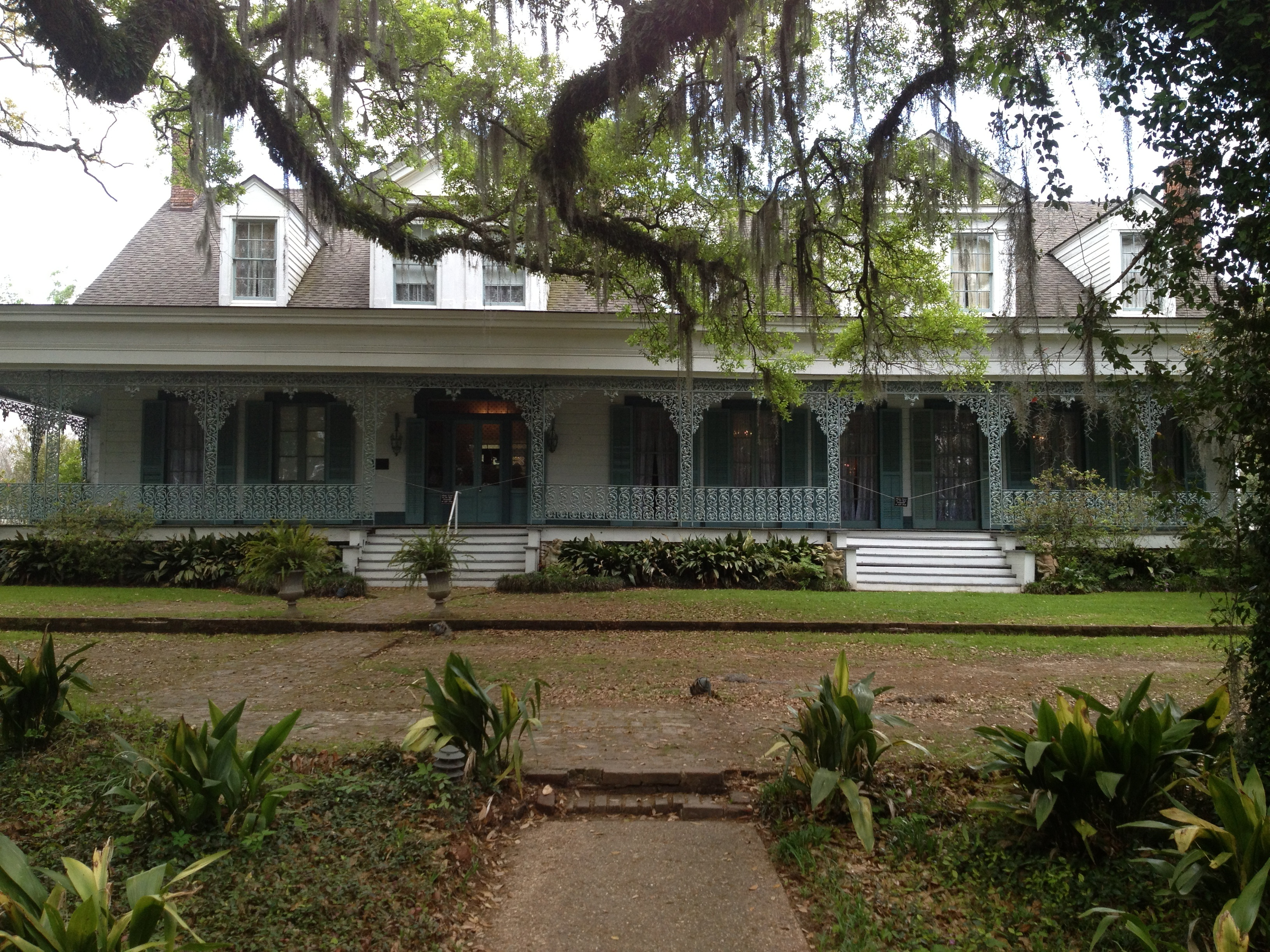
A front view of The Myrtles Plantation

Myrtles Plantation is a historic home and former cajun/creole plantation in St. Francisville, Louisiana, United States, built in 1796. In 2001, Unsolved Mysteries filmed a segment about the alleged hauntings at the plantation. The Myrtles was also featured on a 2005 episode of Ghost Hunters.

== The legend of Chloe ==
Possibly the most well known of the Myrtles' supposed ghosts, Chloe (or Cloe) was reportedly a slave owned by Clark and Sara Woodruff. Versions of the legend have Chloe listening in at keyholes to learn news of Clark Woodruff's business dealings or for other purposes. After being caught, either by Clark or Sara Woodruff, one of her ears was cut off, and she wore a green turban to hide it.

Chloe supposedly baked a cake for one of the two daughters containing extract of boiled and reduced oleander leaves, which are extremely poisonous. The reason she did what she did was to get work back inside the house. A maid who was getting the favor of the mistress was a suspect, with some saying she was getting revenge on the Woodruffs and some saying she was attempting to redeem her position by curing the family of the poisoning. According to the legends, her plan backfired. Only Sara and her two daughters ate the cake, and all died from the poison. Chloe was then supposedly hanged by the other slaves, and thrown into the Mississippi River, either as punishment or to escape punishment by Clark Woodruff for harboring her.

While the U.S. Federal Census confirms that the family owned 5 enslaved people in 1820 and 32 enslaved people in 1830, historical documentation does not support the legend as there are no known records of the Woodruffs owning a slave named Chloe or Cloe. The legends usually claim that Sara and her two daughters were poisoned, but Mary Octavia survived well into adulthood. Finally, Sara, James, and Cornelia Woodruff were not killed by poisoning, but instead succumbed to yellow fever.

== Other legends ==
There are a variety of other legends surrounding the Myrtles.

A mirror located in the house supposedly holds the spirits of Sara Woodruff and two of her children. According to custom, mirrors are covered after a death, but legend says that after the poisoning of the Woodruffs, this particular mirror was overlooked. The uncovered mirror reportedly trapped the spirits of Sara and her children, who are occasionally seen or leave handprints in the mirror.

The plantation is also reportedly haunted by a young girl who died in 1868, despite being treated by a local voodoo practitioner. She supposedly appears in the room in which she died, and has been reported to practice voodoo on people sleeping in the room.

There is also a ghost who reportedly walks, staggers, or crawls up the stairs and stops on the 17th step. Some have said that this is William Drew Winter, the victim of the only verified murder in the house. He was shot on the front porch of the main house and, according to legend, staggered or crawled up the stairs, but collapsed, dead, on the 17th step. Alternate versions of his murder claim he managed to crawl up the stairs, and collapsed in his wife's arms on the 17th step.
