= Sweet Whispers, Brother Rush =

1982 children's novel by Virginia Hamilton

- First edition
- Author: Virginia Hamilton
- Illustrator: Leo and Diane Dillon
- Language: English
- Subject: Children's literature, ghost stories
- Published: 1982 (Philomel Books)
- Publication place: United States
- Media type: Print (hardback, paperback)
- Pages: 217 (unpaginated)
- Awards: 1983 Coretta Scott King Author Award; Newbery Honor
- ISBN: 9780399208942
- OCLC: 8112549

Sweet Whispers, Brother Rush is a 1982 children's novel by Virginia Hamilton. The novel deals with the paranormal, poverty, single motherhood, childhood illness, and child abuse. The novel, like many of Hamilton's works, is set in Ohio.

== Background ==
Hamilton wrote the novel in two locations — in Ohio during winter and spring, and on an island in the Caribbean.

Hamilton included the metabolic disorder porphyria in the novel because a close friend suffered from it; the author noted that she had wanted to work the disorder into a novel for two decades before using it in Sweet Whispers.

Hamilton's opening paragraph format was inspired in part by Truman Capote's short story "Children on their Birthdays."

== Plot ==
Theresa "Tree" Pratt is a wise-beyond-her-years teenager in Ohio, caring for her developmentally disabled older brother, Dab, while their mother is often away working. Dab regularly suffers from a strange illness that leaves him incapacitated. One day, Tree sees a well-dressed man while she is leaving school and is immediately attracted to him. The next time she seems him, he is standing in the middle of a table in a closet in the family's apartment, holding an oval mirror. Tree realizes this is a ghost, Brother Rush. Through Brother Rush's mirror, Tree can see scenes from her family's past — including her mother's abuse of her brother. Once Tree's mother, M'Vy, arrives home, Tree confronts her about both Brother Rush's presence and the family's past, as Dab's illness worsens.

== Characters ==
- Theresa "Tree" Pratt is the protagonist of the novel, Tree cares for her brother Dab while their mother, M'Vy is out, ostensibly working as a domestic worker
- Dabney "Dab" Pratt is Tree's brother, who is developmentally disabled and suffering from a mysterious illness that renders him constantly fatigued and disoriented
- M'Vy is Tree and Dab's mother who works as a practical nurse and is often away from the family's apartment
- Brother Rush is Tree's uncle who regularly appears through a table in the family's apartment, and shows Tree visions of her family's past
- Miss Pricherd is the family's friend and housekeeper
- Silversmith is M'Vy's lover

== Themes ==
Sweet Whispers contains magical realism elements — the ghost character of Brother Rush appears in an otherwise realistic setting. M'Vy tells Tree that she can see ghosts because of the family's African heritage.

Hamilton explores questions of identity, the supernatural, the need to belong within a family, and encounters with death through a Black American point of view.

The character of M'Vy showcases a complicated motherhood, as she is often away from the apartment (and engaged in abuse of Dab when he was younger.) "Hamilton has not created a traditional, stereotypic, idealized mother," wrote one critic.

Hamilton included the ghost of Brother Rush as a literary device to represent the idea that people carry their pasts with them.

== Reception ==
Kirkus Reviews, in reviewing Sweet Whispers, Brother Rush, called it "One of Hamilton's deeply felt family stories" and wrote "like other Hamilton novels this has its rough edges, but they are outweighed here by the blazing scenes, the intensity of Tree's feelings, the glimpses of Dab through her eyes, and the rounded characterization of Vy."

Author Katherine Paterson, reviewing the novel in The New York Times, noted "the last time a first paragraph chilled my spine like this one, I was 16 years old, hunched over a copy of Rebecca."

In the Interracial Books for Children Bulletin, Geraldine Wilson wrote that the novel "is like a thoughtfully designed African American quilt. It is finely stitched, tightly constructed and rooted in cultural authenticity."

Sweet Whispers, Brother Rush has also been reviewed by the English Journal, and the School Library Journal.

== Awards ==
Sweet Whispers, Brother Rush won the 1983 Coretta Scott King Author Award and the 1983 Boston Globe–Horn Book Award.

The novel was a finalist for the 1983 National Book Award for Young People's Literature and was also a Newberry Honor winner in 1983.
