= The People Could Fly =

1985 collection of 25 African American folktales

The People Could Fly: American Black Folktales
- Author: Virginia Hamilton
- Illustrator: Leo and Diane Dillon
- Language: English
- Subject: Children's literature, Slavery in the United States, Folklore
- Published: 1985
- Publisher: Knopf, Distributed by Random House
- Publication place: United States
- Media type: Print (hardback & paperback)
- Pages: 178
- ISBN: 9780394869254
- OCLC: 975841967

The People Could Fly: American Black Folktales is a 1985 collection of twenty-four folktales retold by Virginia Hamilton and illustrated by Leo and Diane Dillon. They encompass animal tales (including tricksters), fairy tales, supernatural tales, and tales of the enslaved Africans (including slave narratives).

== Publication history ==
- 1985, Knopf, ISBN 9780394869254, hardback
- 1987, Knopf, ISBN 9780375804717, audiobook on CD, 12 tales read by James Earl Jones, 1 disc and book
- 2005, Audio Bookshelf, ISBN 9780974171180, audiobook on CD, read by Andrew L. Barnes, 4 discs and book

== Reception ==
A review by the School Library Journal stated, "The well-known author here retells 24 black American folk tales in sure storytelling voice. ... All are beautifully readable," and concluded: "With the added attraction of 40 bordered full- and half-page illustrations by the Dillons wonderfully expressive paintings reproduced in black and white this collection should be snapped up."

The New York Times review by Ishmael Reed called The People Could Fly "extraordinary and wonderful", commended Hamilton for writing "these tales in the Black English of the slave storytellers" and found it "Handsomely illustrated".

The People Could Fly has also been reviewed by Publishers Weekly, Booklist, Common Sense Media,

It has been used in study.

The book inspired the title of the 2021 Metropolitan Museum of Art exhibition, Before Yesterday We Could Fly.

== Awards ==
The People Could Fly has received a number of awards, including:

- 1985 – Horn Book Fanfare Book
- 1985 – New York Times Best Illustrated Children's Books book
- 1986 – Coretta Scott King Award author winner
- 1986 – Coretta Scott King Award illustrator honor
- 1988 – William Allen White Children's Book Award nominee
