= Drums and Shadows =

1940 book by Mary Granger

Drums and Shadows is a book by Mary Granger published in 1940. The book is an account of oral folklore collected in Georgia from African Americans, namely the Gullah people of the Sea Islands, many of whom had been slaves.

The main focus of the book is the set of beliefs gathered from these people, much of which today falls under the category of Hoodoo, including spirits, talismans, lucky and unlucky actions and omens. It also examines the use of drums and dancing during celebrations, funerals and baptisms, as well as other aspects of their folklore. Quotes from the interviewees are recorded in dialect. The African Americans interviewed descended from slaves who came directly from Africa on the slave ship the Wanderer that landed in Jekyll, Georgia, in 1858. The ethnicity of the Africans were Bantu, Ewe, Igbo among many others. They brought their spiritual culture with them that developed into Hoodoo and other African American religious traditions.

Granger uses the information gathered, both from the former slaves interviewed and from African ethnographers and folklore-experts, to conclude that these beliefs originated in Africa. The publishing of the book was done through the Savannah Unit of the Georgia branch of the Federal Writers' Project, of which Granger was a District Supervisor. The copyright has not been renewed, and the work is now in the public domain.

Some of the stories in Drums and Shadows served as an inspiration for the central song in Toni Morrison's novel Song of Solomon.
