= 2004 in literature =

This article contains information about the literary events and publications of 2004.

== Events ==
- January
  - The poet Jang Jin-sung, in trouble with the North Korean authorities, defects to South Korea.
  - The Richard & Judy Book Club is launched on UK daytime television.
- February – Canada Reads selects Guy Vanderhaeghe's The Last Crossing to be read across the nation.
- February 16 – Edwin Morgan becomes Scotland's first official national poet, the Scots Makar, appointed by the Scottish Parliament.
- May 23 – Seattle Central Library, designed by Rem Koolhaas, opens to the public.
- June 1 – Controversy surrounds Battle Royale by Koushun Takami (高見広春), when an 11-year-old fan of the story in Sasebo, Nagasaki, murders her classmate, 12-year-old Satomi Mitarai, in a way that mimics a scene from the story.
- October 14 – Edinburgh becomes UNESCO's first City of Literature.
- October 31 – Denoël in Paris publishes Irène Némirovsky's Suite française, consisting of two novellas, Tempête en juin and Dolce, written and set in 1940–1941, from a sequence left unfinished on the author's death in Auschwitz concentration camp in 1942.
- December 18 – The première of Gurpreet Kaur Bhatti's play Behzti (Dishonour) at England's Birmingham Repertory Theatre is cancelled after violent protests by members of the Sikh community.
- unknown dates
  - Kansas City Public Library's Community Bookshelf is built.
  - The typeface Calibri, designed by Luc(as) de Groot, is introduced.

== New books ==
=== Fiction ===
- Cecelia Ahern – PS, I Love You
- Blue Balliett – Chasing Vermeer
- Iain M. Banks – The Algebraist
- Steven Barnes – The Cestus Deception
- Alistair Beaton – A Planet for the President
- Thomas Berger – Adventures of the Artificial Woman
- Roberto Bolaño (posthumous) – 2666
- T. C. Boyle – The Inner Circle
- Gennifer Choldenko – Al Capone Does My Shirts
- Kate Christensen – The Epicure's Lament: A Novel
- Stephen Clarke – A Year in the Merde
- Susanna Clarke – Jonathan Strange and Mr Norrell
- Wendy Coakley-Thompson – Back to Life
- Suzanne Collins – Gregor the Overlander
- J. J. Connolly – Layer Cake
- Afua Cooper – The Hanging of Angelique
- Bernard Cornwell
  - Sharpe's Escape
  - The Last Kingdom
- Douglas Coupland – Eleanor Rigby
- Stevie Davies – Kith & Kin
- L. Sprague de Camp, Lin Carter and Björn Nyberg – Sagas of Conan
- Michel Déon – Your Father's Room
- Cory Doctorow – Eastern Standard Tribe
- Saken Omur – Joyful Road
- Ben Elton – Past Mortem
- Gustav Ernst – Grado. Süße Nacht
- Giorgio Faletti – Niente di vero tranne gli occhi
- Jon Fosse – Det er Ales (Aliss at the Fire)
- Karen Joy Fowler – The Jane Austen Book Club
- Ge Fei (格非) – 人面桃花 (Renmian Taohua, Peach Blossom Beauty)
- Robert Goddard – Play to the End
- Adrien Goetz – La Dormeuse de Naples
- Helon Habila – Waiting for an Angel
- Margaret Peterson Haddix – Among the Brave
- Elisabeth Harvor, All Times Have Been Modern (Canada)
- Michael Helm – In the Place of Last Things
- Carl Hiaasen – Skinny Dip
- Alan Hollinghurst – The Line of Beauty
- Jiang Rong – Wolf Totem
- Cynthia Kadohata – Kira-Kira
- Mitsuyo Kakuta (角田 光代) – Woman on the Other Shore
- Peg Kehret – Escaping the Giant Wave
- Thomas Keneally – The Tyrant's Novel
- Stephen King
  - The Dark Tower VI: Song of Susannah
  - The Dark Tower VII: The Dark Tower
- John Kiriamiti – My Life in Prison
- Karl Ove Knausgård – A Time to Every Purpose Under Heaven (En tid for alt)
- László Krasznahorkai – Destruction and Sorrow Beneath the Heavens (Rombolás és bánat az Ég alatt)
- Thor Kunkel – Endstufe
- David Leavitt – The Body of Jonah Boyd
- Tanith Lee – Piratica
- David Lodge – Author, Author
- Andreï Makine – The Woman Who Waited (La femme qui attendait)
- Henning Mankell – Depths (Djup)
- David Michaels – Tom Clancy's Splinter Cell
- David Mitchell – Cloud Atlas
- Aka Morchiladze – Santa Esperanza
- Bharati Mukherjee – The Tree Bride
- Alice Munro – Runaway
- V. S. Naipaul – Magic Seeds
- Garth Nix – Grim Tuesday
- Cees Nooteboom – Lost Paradise (Paradijs verloren)
- Linda Sue Park – When My Name Was Keoko
- Jodi Picoult – My Sister's Keeper
- Terry Pratchett
  - A Hat Full of Sky
  - Going Postal
- Michael Reaves and Steve Perry – MedStar I: Battle Surgeons and MedStar II: Jedi Healer
- Marilynne Robinson – Gilead
- Philip Roth – The Plot Against America
- Edward Rutherfurd – Dublin: Foundation
- Nick Sagan – Edenborn
- Andrzej Sapkowski – Warriors of God
- David Sherman and Dan Cragg – Jedi Trial
- Kyle Smith – Love Monkey
- David Southwell – Conspiracy Files
- Muriel Spark – The Finishing School
- Olen Steinhauer – The Confession
- Neal Stephenson
  - The Confusion (Vol. II of the Baroque Cycle)
  - The System of the World (Vol. III of the Baroque Cycle)
- Sean Stewart – Yoda: Dark Rendezvous
- Michel Thaler – Le Train de Nulle Part
- Colm Tóibín – The Master
- Zlatko Topčić – Bare Skin
- Karen Traviss – Star Wars Republic Commando: Hard Contact
- Jonathan Trigell – Boy A
- Andrew Vachss – Down Here
- Vivian Vande Velde – Heir Apparent
- Bob Weltlich – Crooked Zebra
- A. N. Wilson – My Name Is Legion
- Carlos Ruiz Zafon – The Shadow of the Wind
- Juli Zeh – Gaming Instinct
- Florian Zeller – La Fascination du pire (The Fascination of Evil)

=== Children and young people ===
- David Almond – Kate, the Cat and the Moon
- Dave Barry & Ridley Pearson - Peter and the Starcatchers
- Mary Bartek – Funerals and Fly Fishing
- John Fardell – The Seven Professors of the Far North
- Mem Fox – Where Is the Green Sheep?
- Cornelia Funke – When Santa Fell to Earth
- Virginia Hamilton (with Barry Moser) – Wee Winnie Witch's Skinny: An Original African American Scare Tale
- E. L. Konigsburg - The Outcasts of 19 Schuyler Place
- Gordon Korman – Son of the Mob 2: Hollywood Hustle
- J. Patrick Lewis (with Gary Kelley) – The Stolen Smile
- Robert Muchamore – The Recruit (first in the CHERUB series)
- Jenny Nimmo – Charlie Bone and the Blue Boa
- Liz Pichon – My Big Brother, Boris
- Carlos Cuauhtémoc Sánchez – The Eyes of My Princess
- Lemony Snicket – The Grim Grotto
- Dugald Steer (with Nghiem Ta, etc.) – Egyptology: Search for the Tomb of Osiris

=== Drama ===
- Alan Bennett – The History Boys
- Gurpreet Kaur Bhatti – Behzti
- Neil Brand – Stan (radio)
- Bryony Lavery – Frozen
- Brent Hartinger – Geography Club
- Louis Nowra – The Woman with Dog's Eyes
- John Patrick Shanley – Doubt
- Florian Zeller – L'Autre (The Other)

=== Poetry ===
- Seamus Heaney – Beacons at Bealtaine

=== Non-fiction ===
- Steve Almond – Candyfreak
- Thomas P.M. Barnett – The Pentagon's New Map
- Ingmar and Ingrid Bergman and Maria von Rosen – Tre dagböcker (Three diaries)
- T. Mike Childs – The Rocklopedia Fakebandica
- Richard A. Clarke – Against All Enemies: Inside America's War on Terror
- Jonathan Coe – Like A Fiery Elephant: The Story of B. S. Johnson
- Allison Hedge Coke – Rock, Ghost, Willow, Deer
- Anne Coleman – I'll Tell You a Secret
- Flora Fraser – Princesses: The Six Daughters of George III
- Leonie Frieda – Catherine de' Medici
- David Graeber – Fragments of an Anarchist Anthropology
- Sheila Hancock – The Two of Us: My Life with John Thaw
- Gareth Stedman Jones – An End to Poverty?
- Ryszard Kapuściński – Travels with Herodotus
- Pedro Lemebel – Adiós mariquita linda
- Doris Lessing – Time Bites: Views and Reviews
- Lawrence Lessig – Free Culture
- Mario Vargas Llosa – The Temptation of the Impossible
- Roger Lowenstein – Origins of the Crash
- Hugh Masekela – Still Grazing (autobiography)
- Predrag Miletić – Biciklom do Hilandara
- Farah Pahlavi – An Enduring Love: My Life with the Shah
- Chuck Palahniuk – Stranger Than Fiction: True Stories
- Michael Palin – Himalaya
- Sethy Regenvanu – Laef blong mi (From village to nation: an autobiography)
- Anita Roddick – Take it Personally: How globalization affects you and powerful ways to challenge it
- Miranda Seymour – The Bugatti Queen: In Search of a Motor-Racing Legend
- Owen Sheers – The Dust Diaries
- Rebecca Solnit – Hope in the Dark
- Ben Stein – Can America Survive? The Rage of the Left, The Truth, and What to Do About It
- Jon Stewart and writers of The Daily Show – America (The Book): A Citizen's Guide to Democracy Inaction
- Milt Thomas – Cave of a Thousand Tales
- J. Maarten Troost – The Sex Lives of Cannibals
- United Kingdom Government – Delivering Security in a Changing World
- Francis Wheen – How Mumbo-Jumbo Conquered the World (also Idiot Proof: A Short History of Modern Delusions)
- Alford A. Young Jr. – The Minds of Marginalized Black Men

== Films ==
- 2046 - inspired by Liu Yichang's "The Drunkard"
- Harry Potter and the Prisoner of Azkaban
- The Phantom of the Opera

== Deaths ==
- January 3 – Lillian Beckwith, English novelist (born 1916)
- January 4
  - Joan Aiken, English novelist and children's writer (born 1924)
  - Jeff Nuttall, English poet, artist and activist (born 1933)
  - Dorota Terakowska, Polish writer and journalist, author of fantasy books for children and young adults (born 1938)
  - John Toland, American author and historian (born 1912)
- January 10
  - Alexandra Ripley, American novelist (born 1934)
  - (or January 11) Spalding Gray, American writer and actor (born 1942)
- January 13 – Zeno Vendler, American philosopher and linguist (born 1921)
- January 14 – Jack Cady, American fantasy and horror novelist (born 1932)
- January 15
  - Alex Barris, Canadian actor and writer (born 1922)
  - Olivia Goldsmith, American novelist (complications from cosmetic surgery, born 1949)
- January 24 – Abdul Rahman Munif, Arab writer (born 1933)
- January 29
  - Janet Frame, New Zealand novelist, poet and short story writer (born 1924)
  - M. M. Kaye, Indian-born English novelist (born 1908)
- February 2 – Alan Bullock, English historian (born 1914)
- February 4 – Hilda Hilst, Brazilian poet, playwright and novelist (born 1930)
- February 5 – Frances Partridge, English diarist (born 1900)
- February 7 – Norman Thelwell, English cartoonist (born 1923)
- February 17 – Bruce Beaver, Australian poet and novelist (born 1928)
- February 27 – Paul Sweezy, American economist and editor (born 1910)
- February 28 – Daniel J. Boorstin, American historian (born 1914)
- February 29 – Jerome Lawrence, American playwright (born 1915)
- March 9 – Albert Mol, Dutch author, actor and dancer (born 1917)
- March 27 – Robert Merle, French novelist (born 1908)
- March 29 – Peter Ustinov, English actor, dramatist and memoirist (born 1921)
- March 30
  - Alistair Cooke, English-born American journalist and broadcaster (born 1908)
  - Michael King OBE, New Zealand historian, author and biographer (born 1945)
- April 19
  - Norris McWhirter, English writer and activist (born 1925)
  - John Maynard Smith, English evolutionary biologist and writer (born 1920)
- April 25 – Thom Gunn, English poet (born 1929)
- April 26 – Hubert Selby, Jr., American author (born 1928)
- May 2 – Paul Guimard, French writer (born 1921)
- May 12
  - Syd Hoff, American author and illustrator (born 1912)
  - Alexander Skutch, American scientific writer and naturalist (born 1904)
- May 31 – Lionel Abrahams, South African novelist, poet and essayist (born 1928)
- July 1 – Peter Barnes, English playwright (born 1931)
- July 8 – Paula Danziger, American children's and young adult novelist (born 1945)
- August 8 – Farida Diouri, Moroccan novelist (born 1953)
- August 12 – Humayun Azad, Bangladeshi author, poet, scholar and linguist (born 1947)
- August 14 – Czesław Miłosz, Polish writer and Nobel laureate (born 1911)
- August 30 – Mario Levrero, Uruguayan novelist (born 1940)
- September 18 – Norman Cantor, Canadian historian (born 1929)
- September 24 – Françoise Sagan, French novelist (born 1935)
- September 28 – Mulk Raj Anand, Indian novelist in English (born 1905)
- October – Natalya Baranskaya, Russian short-story writer (born 1908)
- October 8 – Jacques Derrida, Algerian-born French literary critic (born 1930)
- October 13 – Bernice Rubens, Welsh-born novelist (born 1928)
- October 16
  - Vincent Brome, English biographer and novelist (born 1910)
  - Harold Perkin, English social historian (born 1926)
- October 20 – Anthony Hecht, American poet (born 1923)
- November 9 – Stieg Larsson, Swedish journalist and crime novelist (heart attack, born 1954)
- November 24 – Arthur Hailey, Canadian novelist (born 1920)
- December 2 – Mona Van Duyn, American poet (born 1921)
- December 8 – Jackson Mac Low, American poet (born 1922)
- December 12 – Phaswane Mpe, South African novelist (born 1970)
- December 13 – Jón frá Pálmholti (Jón Kjartansson), Icelandic writer and journalist (born 1930)
- December 18 – Anthony Sampson, British journalist and biographer (born 1926)
- December 28 – Susan Sontag, American novelist (born 1933)

== Awards ==
- Nobel Prize for Literature: Elfriede Jelinek
- Camões Prize: Agustina Bessa-Luís

=== Australia ===
- The Australian/Vogel Literary Award: Julienne van Loon, Road Story
- Victorian Premier's Literary Award C. J. Dennis Prize for Poetry: Judith Beveridge, Wolf Notes
- Kenneth Slessor Prize for Poetry: Pam Brown, Dear Deliria: New & Selected Poems
- Mary Gilmore Prize: David McCooey, Blister Pack; Michael Brennan, Imageless World
- Miles Franklin Award: Shirley Hazzard, The Great Fire
- Victorian Premier's Literary Award Vance Palmer Prize for Fiction: Annamarie Jagose, Slow Water

=== Canada ===
- Giller Prize: Alice Munro, Runaway
- Governor General's Awards: See 2004 Governor General's Awards
- Griffin Poetry Prize: Anne Simpson, Loop and August Kleinzahler, The Strange Hours Travelers Keep
- Edna Staebler Award for Creative Non-Fiction: Andrea Curtis, Into the Blue

=== Sweden ===
- Astrid Lindgren Memorial Award: Lygia Bojunga Nunes

=== United Kingdom ===
- Caine Prize for African Writing: Brian Chikwava, "Seventh Street Alchemy"
- Carnegie Medal for children's literature: Frank Cottrell Boyce, Millions
- Cholmondeley Award: John Agard, Ruth Padel Lawrence Sail, Eva Salzman
- Eric Gregory Award: Nick Laird, Elizabeth Manuel, Abi Curtis, Sophie Levy, Saradha Soobrayen
- James Tait Black Memorial Prize for biography: Jonathan Bate, John Clare: A Biography
- James Tait Black Memorial Prize for fiction: David Peace, GB84
- Man Booker Prize: Alan Hollinghurst, The Line of Beauty
- Orange Prize for Fiction: Andrea Levy, Small Island
- Queen's Gold Medal for Poetry: Hugo Williams
- Whitbread Best Book Award: Andrea Levy, Small Island

=== United States ===
- Aiken Taylor Award for Modern American Poetry: Henry Taylor
- Agnes Lynch Starrett Poetry Prize: Aaron Smith, Blue on Blue Ground
- Bernard F. Connors Prize for Poetry: Jeremy Glazier, "Conversations with the Sidereal Messenger"
- Bobbitt National Prize for Poetry: B.H. Fairchild, Early Occult Memory Systems of the Lower Midwest
- Brittingham Prize in Poetry: John Brehm, Sea of Faith
- Compton Crook Award: E. E. Knight, Way of the Wolf
- Frost Medal: Richard Howard
- Hugo Award for Best Novel: Lois McMaster Bujold, Paladin of Souls
- Lambda Literary Awards: Multiple categories; see 2004 Lambda Literary Awards.
- National Book Award for Fiction: to The News from Paraguay by Lily Tuck
- National Book Critics Circle Award: to Gilead by Marilynne Robinson
- PEN/Faulkner Award for Fiction: to The Early Stories: 1953–1975 by John Updike
- Wallace Stevens Award: Mark Strand
- Whiting Awards:

Fiction: Daniel Alarcón, Kirsten Bakis, Victor LaValle
Nonfiction: Allison Glock, John Jeremiah Sullivan
Plays: Elana Greenfield, Tracey Scott Wilson
Poetry: Catherine Barnett, Dan Chiasson, A. Van Jordan

=== Elsewhere ===
- Friedenspreis des Deutschen Buchhandels: Péter Esterházy
- Premio Nadal: Antonio Soler, El camino de los ingleses

== See also ==
- List of years in literature
- Literature
- Poetry
- List of literary awards
- List of poetry awards
- The Best American Short Stories 2004
- 2004 in Australian literature

== Notes ==
- Hahn, Daniel (2015). The Oxford companion to children's literature (Second ed.). Oxford. ISBN 978-0-19-871554-2.
