= La Dormeuse de Naples =

La Dormeuse de Naples may refer to:

- La Dormeuse de Naples (novel), a 2004 novel by French author Adrien Goetz
- La Dormeuse de Naples (painting), an 1809 painting by French artist Jean-Auguste-Dominique Ingres, now lost
