= Heir apparent (disambiguation) =

An heir apparent is someone likely to inherit a throne or title.

Heir Apparent may also refer to

- Heir Apparent (novel)
- Heir Apparent (band)
- "Heir Apparent", a song by Opeth from the album Watershed
- "Heir Apparent", a song by Morrissey from the "Alma Matters" single
- For Heir to the Throne, the videogame expansion pack for Europa Universalis III
- Heir to the Throne, one Campaign from The Battle for Wesnoth
