= La Dormeuse de Naples (painting) =

Painting by Jean-Auguste-Dominique Ingres

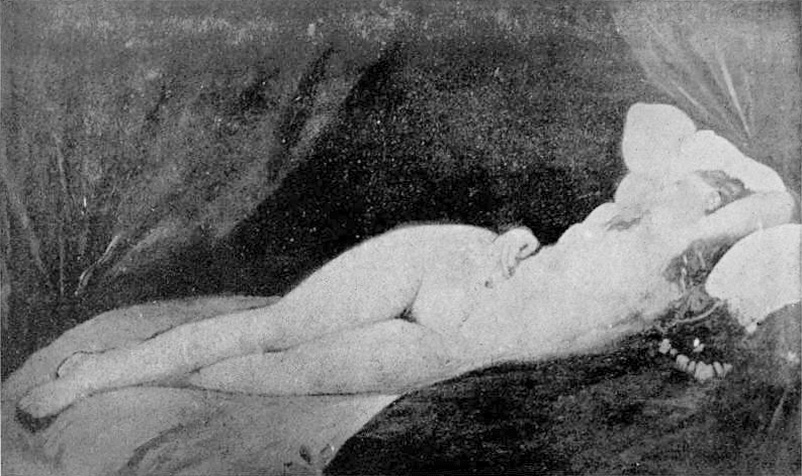
Photograph of a study for the painting

La Dormeuse de Naples (literally The Sleeping Woman of Naples; originally known as Donna nuda che dorme or Sleeping nude woman) was an 1809 painting by the French artist Jean-Auguste-Dominique Ingres, now lost. He reused the pose in two later works, Odalisque with Slave (1839) and Jupiter and Antiope (1851).

== History ==
It was first conceived in 1807 while Ingres was at the French Academy in Rome as part of the portfolio as a 'pensionnaire' of the Academy. It was completed on 28 October 1809 and exhibited as number 58 in the Capitoline Museums. It was bought later that year by Joachim Murat, king of Naples for 50 louis–he moved it to the smaller apartments of the royal palace.

Murat's wife and queen consort Caroline commissioned the 1814 la Grande Odalisque as a pendant for the painting, on a canvas of the same dimensions. La Dormeuse de Naples disappeared in 1815 after the royal palace in Naples was pillaged following Murat's fall from power. It is only known through its preparatory studies, a drawing made from memory by Ingres and an old photograph of a study for it. In 1832 Ingres asked Caroline Murat about the painting by courier in an attempt to locate it in time to exhibit at the Salon of 1833, but this was unsuccessful. Several theories have arisen as to its present locations, inspiring the 2004 French novel La Dormeuse de Naples by Adrien Goetz.

== Description ==
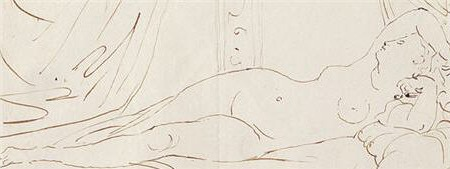
Ingres, drawing from memory of la Dormeuse de Naples, on the verso of his 1832 letter to Caroline Murat (Bibliothèque Nationale, département des manuscrits).

In his 1832 letter to Caroline Murat, Ingres described the painting and provided a rapid sketch of it from memory. Ingres stated that the painting showed a nude life-size female stretched out on a day-bed, her head resting on her left arm, which in turn rested on a cushion, and the right arm behind the head.

== Inspirations ==
As with several other works from his neoclassical period, such as Jupiter and Thetis and Romulus, Vanquisher of Acron, Ingres was influenced by both classical sculpture and Renaissance painting. Like most reclining female nudes in western art, it derived from the posture of the Sleeping Ariadne sculpture in the Vatican Museums. Ingres' Renaissance sources included Giorgione's Sleeping Venus (which he knew from engravings) and Titian's Pardo Venus (the closest influence on the pose of Ingres' nude) and the Venus of Urbino (which he had studied in the Uffizi and of which he produced a copy in 1822).

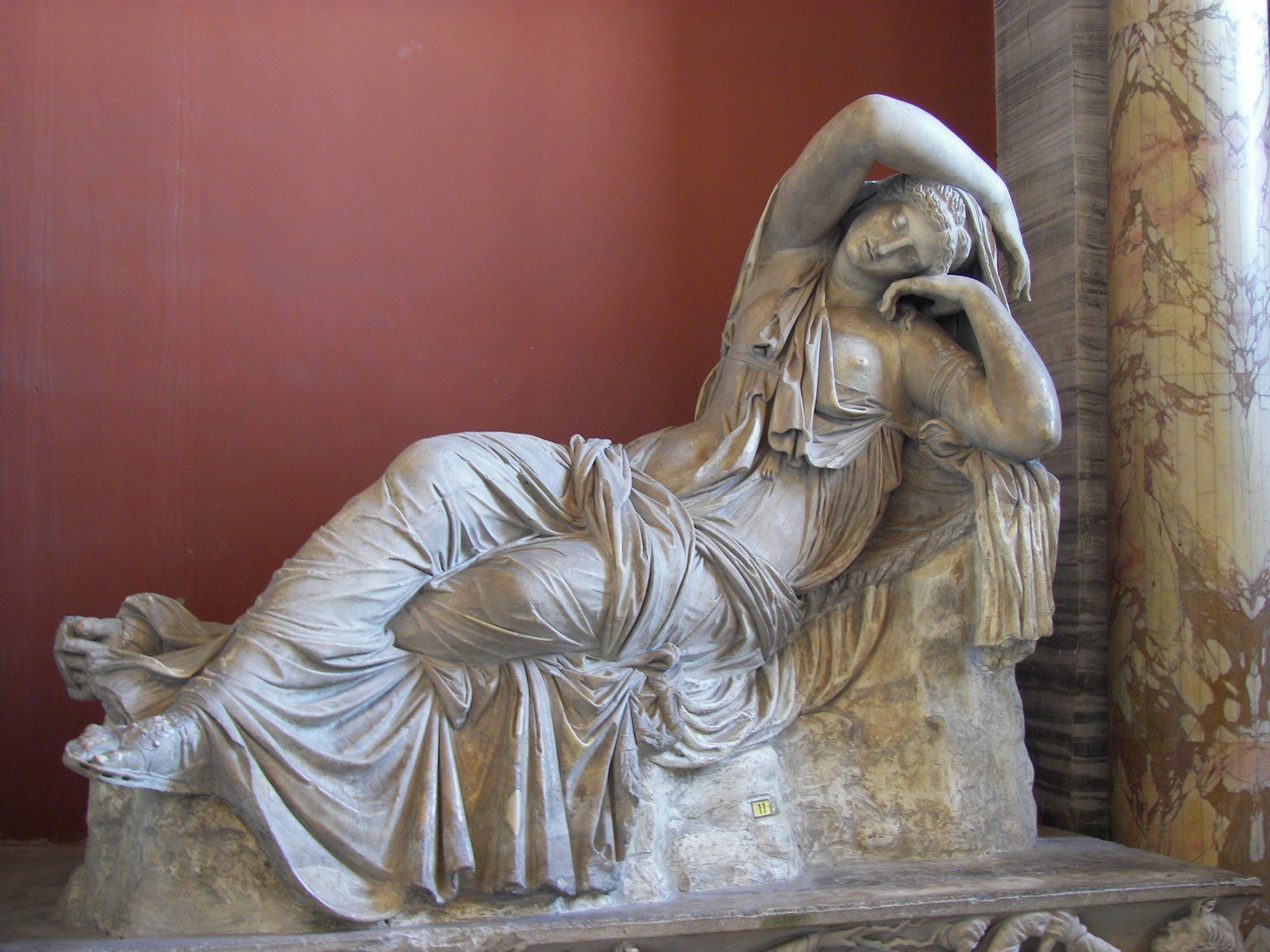
Sleeping Ariadne, Roman copy of a Hellenistic sculpture, Vatican Museums

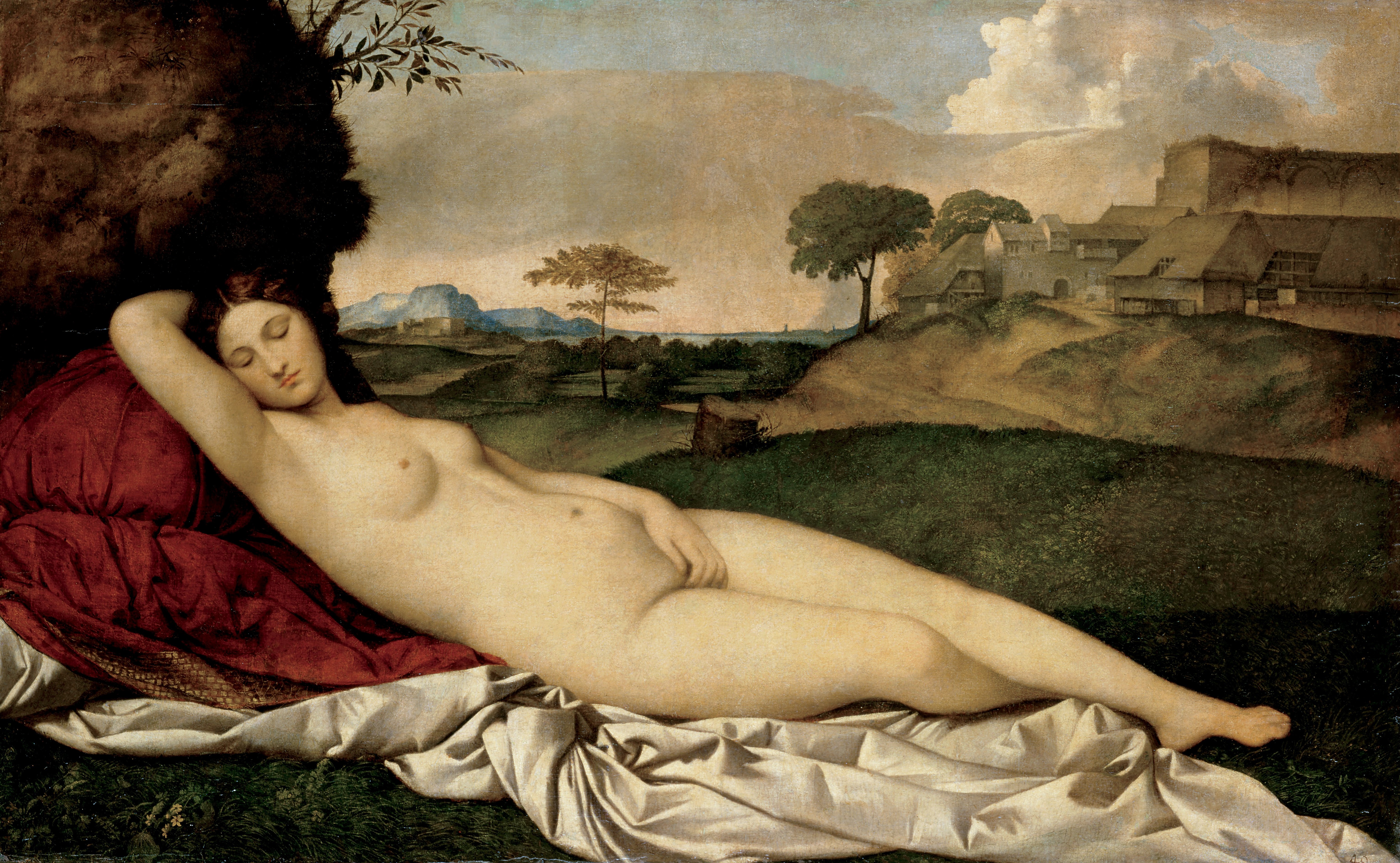
Giorgione, Sleeping Venus Gemäldegalerie Alte Meister

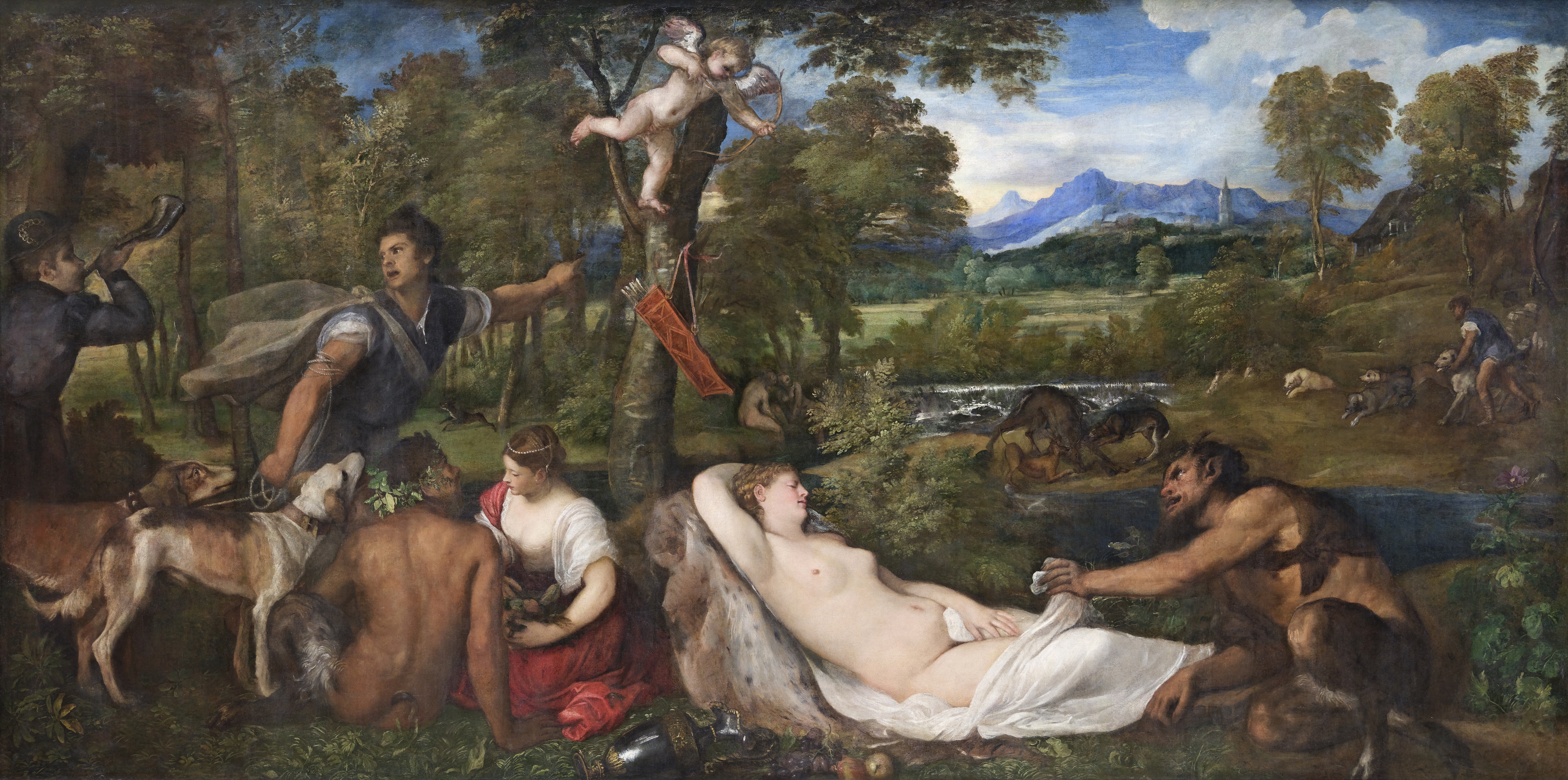
Titian, Jupiter and Antiope or Pardo Venus, musée du Louvre

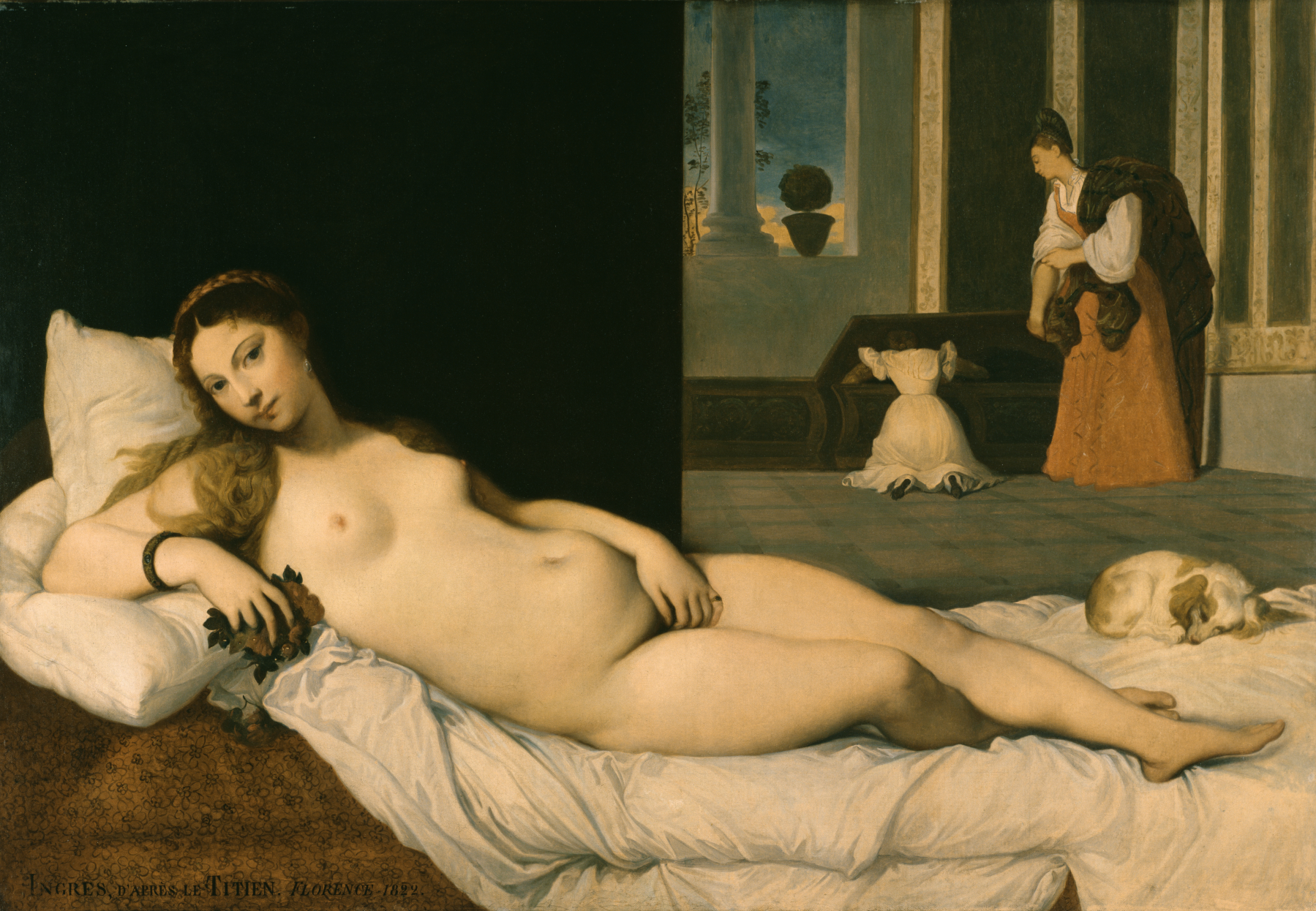
Ingres, copy of Titian's Venus of Urbino, 1822 Walters Art Museum

== See also ==
- List of paintings by Jean-Auguste-Dominique Ingres

== Bibliography ==
- Bajou, Valérie (1999). Monsieur Ingres (in French). Paris: Adam Biro. ISBN 2-87660-268-7.
- Carrigton Shelton, Andrew (2008). Ingres. Translated by Ladjadj, Hélène. Paris: Phaidon. ISBN 978-0-7148-5859-3.
- Pomarède, Vincent, ed. (2006). Ingres : 1780–1867 (in French). Paris: Gallimard (catalogue d'exposition). ISBN 2-07-011843-6.
- Rosenblum, Robert (1986). Ingres. Cercle d'Art, coll (in French). Paris: La Bibliothèque des Grands Peintres. ISBN 2-7022-0192-X.
- Ternois, Daniel (1980). Ingres (in French). Paris: Fernand Nathan. ISBN 2-09-284-557-8.
- Ternois, Daniel; Camesasca, Ettore (1984). Tout l'œuvre peint de Ingres (in French). Paris: Flammarion. ISBN 2-08-010240-0.
