= Unmaking Russia's Abortion Culture =

2024 book by Michele Rivkin-Fish

Unmaking Russia's Abortion Culture: Family Planning and the Struggle for a Liberal Biopolitics
- Cover
- Author: Michele Rivkin-Fish
- Language: English
- Series: Policy to Practice: Ethnographic Perspectives on Global Health Systems
- Subject: Family planning in Russia, Birth control, Abortion in Russia
- Genre: Anthropology, Non-fiction
- Publisher: Vanderbilt University Press
- Publication date: October 30, 2024
- Publication place: United States
- Media type: Print (hardcover, paperback), e-book
- Pages: 348
- Awards: Honorable Mention, Davis Center Book Prize in Political and Social Studies, Association for Slavic, East European, and Eurasian Studies (2025)
- ISBN: 978-0-8265-0697-9 (hardcover); 978-0-8265-0696-2 (paperback)
- LC Class: HQ766.5.R9 R58 2024

Unmaking Russia's Abortion Culture: Family Planning and the Struggle for a Liberal Biopolitics is a 2024 book by American anthropologist Michele Rivkin-Fish. The book traces the history of reproductive politics in Soviet and post-Soviet Russia. The author focuses on efforts by health professionals and family planning advocates to promote modern contraceptives as an alternative to abortion, which served as the primary method of birth control throughout Soviet history due to chronic shortages of reliable contraceptive supplies and lack of reliable information about preventing pregnancy. Based on ethnographic fieldwork, archival research, and analysis of literary texts, Rivkin-Fish documents the establishment of family planning institutions in the 1990s and the subsequent opposition they faced from nationalist and Russian Orthodox groups who cast contraceptive advocacy as a Western threat to Russian demographic strength. The author frames the decline of Russian family planning organizations as part of a global illiberal backlash against reproductive rights.

== Background ==
Rivkin-Fish began conducting fieldwork on reproductive health in Russia in 1994. She initially studied maternity care reforms in St. Petersburg and demographic politics before turning to the emerging family planning movement. Her research included observations at contraceptive counseling workshops, sex education lectures, and teenage reproductive health clinics, as well as interviews with physicians, activists, and health officials over a period spanning from the mid-1990s through the 2010s. The book is dedicated in part to demographer Andrej Popov, a pioneering advocate for contraceptive education whom Rivkin-Fish met during her early research and with whom she had planned to collaborate before his death in 1995 at the age of thirty-nine.

== Summary ==
Rivkin-Fish examines the history of reproductive politics in Soviet and post-Soviet Russia. She traces efforts by health professionals and family planning advocates to reduce the country's reliance on abortion as the primary method of birth control and to promote modern contraceptives in its place. These efforts were ineffective during the Soviet era due largely to the deficit economy, and became highly controversial in the post-Soviet context, as conservatives accused birth control campaigns of reducing pregnancies and thereby exacerbating Russia's demographic crisis. She draws on her own ethnographic fieldwork conducted in Russia from the 1990s through the 2010s, as well as archival research into Soviet health education literature, and analysis of literary texts depicting women's experiences with unintended pregnancy.

Rivkin-Fish starts by introducing the concept of biopolitics (the governance of populations and bodies by the state) as a framework for understanding Soviet reproductive policy. This concept contextualizes what researchers termed Russia's "abortion culture": a pattern whereby, due to the chronic unavailability of reliable contraceptives, Soviet women routinely relied on abortion to control their fertility, often undergoing multiple procedures over the course of their reproductive lives. Following abortion's re-legalization in 1955, rates remained among the highest in the world for decades, despite the state's official opposition to the practice.

The study begins its historical analysis by investigating representations of abortion in late Soviet and post-Soviet fiction and memoir, and analyzing works by authors such as Natalya Baranskaya, Elena Makarova, Marina Palei, Liudmila Petrushevskaya, Maria Arbatova, and Ludmila Ulitskaya. These literary texts depict abortion as simultaneously normalized and shadowed with disapproval. Rivkin-Fish shows how abortion offered writers a vehicle for exploring themes of women's suffering the failures of intimate relationships, and the hypocrisies of Soviet medical institutions. The author argues that these narratives enabled women writers to critique social conditions without adopting explicit political positions.

Rivkin-Fish then turns to Soviet health experts' strategies for reducing abortion from the 1950s through the late 1980s. Operating within socialist ideological frameworks of "social hygiene" and "sanitary enlightenment," these experts produced educational materials warning women about the dangers of abortion and encouraging motherhood, while the state simultaneously failed to supply adequate contraceptives. She examines tensions between pronatalist goals and the recognition among some researchers that contraceptive availability would reduce both abortion and its associated health complications.

Demographer Andrej Popov developed contraceptive education materials in the 1980s and early 1990s that broke with conventional Soviet approaches to reproductive health. His materials emphasized individual choice, acknowledged sexual pleasure as a legitimate concern, and addressed both men and women as responsible parties in preventing pregnancy. The author places Popov's work within the broader intellectual currents of late Soviet culture, including the influence of sexologist Igor Kon and demographer Anatoly Vishnevsky.

Following the Soviet collapse, Russian advocates established the country's first family planning institutions, including clinics and an advocacy and educational NGO, the Russian Association of Family Planning (RAFP). Founded in 1991 with support from the International Planned Parenthood Federation, the RAFP also received support from the Yeltsin administration. Rivkin-Fish demonstrates how Russian family planning advocates navigated between Western reproductive rights frameworks and local political sensibilities, often emphasizing family and national health rather than individual women's rights. Their efforts included collaborations with international organizations and pharmaceutical companies, the creation of teenage reproductive health clinics such as Yuventa in St. Petersburg, and the training of physicians in new counseling methods. The author argues that these liberal aspirations were ultimately undermined by the destabilizing effects of neoliberal economic reforms, which brought economic instability, a weakened welfare system, and a deregulated media environment.

Two figures became prominent in Rivkin-Fish's account of Russia's family planning movement: psychotherapist and sex educator Viktor Samokhvalov, who trained physicians in adolescent reproductive health at Yuventa, and gynecologist Liubov Erofeeva, who became director of the Russian Association of Family Planning (later renamed the Russian Association of Population and Development). Both faced organized opposition from nationalist and Russian Orthodox groups who accused family planning advocates of corrupting youth and serving foreign interests. Family planners were increasingly stigmatized as anti-family and anti-Russian agents of a Western conspiracy to reduce Russia's fertility.

Feminist campaigns emerged in 2011 and 2015 to defend legal abortion against proposed restrictions. These activists deployed slogans such as "My body, my business" while also critiquing the state's failure to support mothers and families. The author notes that these campaigns drew on both individual rights frameworks and appeals to collective welfare, and argues that a "reproductive justice" framework emphasizing socioeconomic support for families may resonate more effectively in the Russian context than Western "pro-choice" rhetoric focused primarily on individual autonomy.

Pronatalist and anti-abortion positions have gained increasing influence in Russian public policy, including through partnerships between the state and the Russian Orthodox Church to discourage abortion through pre-procedure persuasion "counseling" and material incentives for childbearing. The author places these developments within broader global trends of illiberal backlash against reproductive rights, suggesting that efforts to control women's reproductive autonomy constitute a transnational phenomenon requiring transnational responses.

== Critical reception ==
Valerie Sperling called the work "excellent" and a "timely addition to the scholarship on reproductive rights," commending its well-documented and readable account of the struggles faced by Russian family planning experts. Sperling emphasized the book's treatment of how reproductive rights advocates might frame their arguments to resonate with citizens, pointing to its observation that Russian women in the post-Soviet period experienced abortion not as "choice" but as a "lack of choice" due to absent contraceptive options. She drew attention to the argument that patriarchal-nationalist efforts to control women's bodies represent a transnational phenomenon. She also remarked that the book poses difficult questions about feminist organizing on reproductive rights, given that abortion restrictions in Russia have intensified despite the existence of an organized feminist movement.

A. H. Koblitz found the study well documented and clearly written, recommending it to scholars and students in gender studies, global health, and post-Soviet Russian studies. Koblitz quoted the book's argument that "the liberal humanistic aspirations family planners envisioned ... were overtaken by broader shocks from neoliberal capitalism, which subjected society to tremendous economic instability, a crumbling welfare system, and a deregulated media awash in porn and violence."

== Presentation at INED ==
The book was presented at the French National Institute for Demographic Studies (INED) in Paris on December 3, 2024, in an event organized in collaboration with the Centre for Russian, Caucasian and Central European Studies (CERCEC) at EHESS, with commentary by demographer Alain Blum.

== Honorable mention ==
- Honorable Mention, Davis Center Book Prize In Political And Social Studies For Outstanding Monograph On Russia, Eurasia, Or Eastern Europe In Anthropology, Political Science, Sociology, Or Geography, Association for Slavic, East European, and Eurasian Studies (2025)
