= Dragon's Bait =

1992 book by Vivian Vande Velde

- Author: Vivian Vande Velde
- Language: English
- Genre: Fantasy
- Published: Harcourt/Magic Carpet Books 1992; HMH Books for Young Readers, April 1, 2003
- Publication place: United States
- Pages: 208

Dragon's Bait by Vivian Vande Velde is a fantasy novel for young readers published in 1992.

== Plot summary ==
Alys has been falsely accused of witchcraft and is about to be sacrificed to a dragon. Then, Selendrile, a LeGuinian dragon that can assume a human form, offers to help her retaliate. Along the way to revenge against her inquisitor, Alys and Selendrile find a complicated path. This adventure looks at issues of revenge, heroism, and more with a splash of irony.

== Awards and honors ==
- ALA Quick Pick
- American Library Association Recommended Books for the Reluctant Young Adult Reader
- Junior Library Guild selection
- New York Public Library Books for the Teen Age
