= Grado. Süße Nacht =

2004 book by Gustav Ernst

Grado. Süße Nacht (Grado. Sweet Night) is a short novel by Gustav Ernst first published in 2004. Set in Grado, Italy, on a summer's evening, the book is a long monologue spoken by a middle-aged Austrian man alone on holiday. Over dinner, he addresses a woman he has just met whose "offer" to have sex with him right after their three-course meal he refuses, detailing all the reasons why he thinks each of them will be better off if they do not succumb to carnal knowledge. However, right from the start, he is aware that the woman has actually never made him an offer.

Grado contains sexually explicit language and, according to the publisher, should not be read by people under 18.
