= D'yan Forest =

American comedian

D'yan Forest (born 1934) is an American comedian. She was named the Oldest Working Female Comedian in the World by the Guinness Book of World Records at age 87. Her award was presented by Ross Mathews of RuPaul's Drag Race.

== Early life and education ==
Forest lived though World War II and lost her whole family in Riga in the Holocaust. She grew up in Newton, Massachusetts. After a divorce, she spent two years in Paris and then moved to Manhattan in 1966.

== Career ==
Forest worked as a singer and pianist, performing cabaret songs mostly in French. In 2003, she hired a comedy coach and began to perform standup sets in clubs in Manhattan. She has performed on Saturday Night Live, France's Got Talent, Comedy Central and The Drew Barrymore Show, in the Gotham Comedy Club, Caroline's, the Broadway Comedy Club, and at the New York Fringe Festival.

== One-woman shows ==
At 88, Forest performed an autobiographical one-woman show, Swinging on the Seine: Searching for Amour in 1960s Paris, at Joe's Pub in Manhattan, after performing it at La Nouvelle Seine in Paris and the Duplex Cabaret Theatre in New York. She previously performed I Married A Nun and Around the World in 80 Years.

== Book ==
- I Did It My Ways: An 86-year-old stand-up comedian's lifelong journey from prudish Bostonian to scandalous Parisienne, and beyond (2021, with Stephen Clarke) ISBN 978-2952163873

== Personal life ==
Forest has joked that she "didn't beat cancer twice not to become the oldest at something".
