= David Southwell =

David Southwell (born 1971) is a British writer, and the author of several books on conspiracy theories and organized crime.

== Career ==
Prior to full-time writing, Southwell worked as a journalist and as Director of Communications for the British Retail Consortium (BRC). In his role at the BRC, he regularly clashed with the British government's media relations department and pressure groups, and played a part in forcing Stephen Byers to scrap the Rip-Off Britain campaign. In a front-page story in The Sunday Times in 2003, Southwell, then a spokesman for the BRC, mentioned that MI5 was coordinating with the business community with regard to potential terrorism. Southwell later stated in his own books that he had liaised with MI5 on anti-terrorism issues and with the UK Government's emergency planning Cabinet Committee Cabinet Office Briefing Room A (COBRA).

He has acknowledged a specialist knowledge and ongoing interest in the Angry Brigade and conspiracies surrounding the events that inspired VALIS. In 2005 he was thanked as an inspiration by Gary Russell in his Doctor Who novel Spiral Scratch.

A regular broadcaster in the UK and North America on the subjects of conspiracies and counter-culture, he jokingly claims on the back of his books that if he "dies a mysterious death it will be because he knows too much and has upset some very powerful people".

Southwell lives on a narrowboat on Regent's Canal in London, and married for the second time in 2010. He wears an eye-patch due to the loss of 80% of the sight in one eye.

In early 2016 Southwell was a winning contestant on the BBC quiz Pointless.

== Major non-fiction works ==
- Guano Stains Grandma aka Astounding Anagrams (with Anne-Marie Forker) - 1999
- Conspiracy Theories (with Sean Twist) - 1999
- Dirty Cash - 2002
- Conspiracy Files (with Sean Twist) - 2004
- Secrets and Lies - 2005
- Global Gangland The History of Organized Crime - 2006
- 1001 Ridiculous Ways to Die (with Matt Adams) - 2008
- The Kennedy Assassination: The Truth behind the Conspiracy that Killed the President - 2012
- 1001 More Ridiculous Ways to Die - 2013
