= Gothic! Ten Original Dark Tales =

Compilation of young adult horror short stories, edited by D. Noyes

First edition, cover art by Gary Kelley

Gothic! Ten Original Dark Tales is a compilation of young adult horror short stories, edited by Deborah Noyes. It was published in 2004 by Candlewick Press.

== Background ==
The stories in this book are gothic. The compiler summarized what she thinks of gothic as, "It's probably more accurate to think of gothic as a room within the larger house of horror. Its decor is distinctive. It insists on burden of the past. It also gleefully turns our ideas of good and evil on end." While most of the short stories are gothic, a reviewer for Teen Reads said that there are stories that are both dark and funny. The authors in this novel include Joan Aiken, Vivian Vande Velde, M.T. Anderson, Neil Gaiman, Caitlin R. Kiernan, Barry Yourgrau, Janni Lee Simmer, Gregory Maguire, Celia Rees, and Garth Nix.

== Contents ==
- "Lungewater" is about a ghost that haunts a river in the gloomy countryside.
- "Morgan Rochemar's Boy" is about a ghost that haunts a hay ride.
- "Watch and Wake" is about a boy that visits a town that does not seem normal.
- "Forbidden Brides of the Faceless Slaves in the Nameless House of the Night of Dread Desire" is a parody of Gothic literature.
- "The Dead and the Moonstruck" is a coming-of-age tale with a gothic twist.
- "Have No Fear, Crumpot Is Here" is about a boy that is forced to go on a summer trip to Italy that he will never forget.
- "Stone Tower" is a story that is a mix of fairy tale and gothic.
- "The Prank" is about two characters that suffer from guilt. One person from an older one, one person from a recent one.
- "Writing on the Wall" is about a ghost that haunts a house.
- "Endings" is told from the perspective of a vampire.

== Awards ==
The book was nominated for a Locus Poll Award in 2005 in the category Best Young Adult Book. The book is An American Library Association (ALA) Best Book for Young Adults, A Kirkus Reviews Editors’ Choice, A Junior Library Guild Selection, A VOYA Best Sci-Fi, Fantasy, and Horror Title, and A New York Public Library Book for the Teen Age.

== Reception ==
The book is listed in Best Books for Young Adults which is from the Young Adult Library Services Association. The book is also listed in The Year's Best Science Fiction: Twenty-Second Annual Collection by Gardner Dozois. Joseph DeMarco, of Kliatt, said that readers will not be disappointed and that they will have trouble forgetting the horror. Jennifer Mattson, of Booklist, liked the book despite its clichés.
