= Cave of a Thousand Tales =

2004 book by Milt Thomas

- Dust-jacket illustration by Keith Minnion for Cave of a Thousand Tales
- Author: Milt Thomas
- Cover artist: Keith Minnion, design by JenGraph(Jennifer Niles)
- Language: English
- Subject: Biography
- Publisher: Arkham House
- Publication date: 2004
- Publication place: United States
- Media type: Print (Hardback)
- Pages: xvii, 287 pp
- ISBN: 0-87054-183-8
- OCLC: 56072011
- Dewey Decimal: 813/.52 B 22
- LC Class: PS3505.A912 Z87 2004

Cave of a Thousand Tales: The Life and Times of Pulp Author Hugh B. Cave is a biography of Hugh B. Cave written by Milt Thomas. It was released in 2004 by Arkham House in an edition of approximately 2,500 copies. It was Thomas' first book published by Arkham House. The book was nominated for an International Horror Guild Award in 2004.
