= The Eyes of My Princess =

2004 novel

- First edition (Spanish)
- Author: Carlos Cuauhtémoc Sánchez
- Original title: Los ojos de mi princesa
- Language: Spanish
- Genre: Young adult
- Publisher: Diamante
- Publication date: 2004
- Publication place: Mexico
- Media type: Print
- Pages: 303 pp
- ISBN: 9789687277639
- OCLC: 519949943

The Eyes of My Princess (Los ojos de mi princesa) is a young-adult novel written by Mexican author Carlos Cuauhtémoc Sánchez. Published in 2004, the novel tells the story of a teenager that falls in love with a girl at school and has to overcome a lot of problems to be with her. This is the complete version of the 1996 story called "La fuerza de Sheccid" (Sheccid's Strength).

== Plot ==
The story begins when Jose Carlos, a shy fifteen-year-old, realizes he has fallen in love for the first time with the new girl in his school. After school, a strange man arrives with Carlos's classmate, Mario, and lures him into his car. The man is a porn producer, and he tries to convince Carlos to get his classmate Ariadne to make porn with them. Finally Carlos escapes with the help of Ariadne, who is a friend of the new girl. Carlos tells his parents to go to the police, but they are unable to locate the man, who abducted Mario.

One day he decides to talk with the new girl, Sheccid (her real name is Lorenna Deghemteri, but Carlos changes it for the name of an Arabic princess). He confesses his love, but things go wrong when Ariadne recognizes him and tells Sheccid he is related to the pervert who tried to abduct her. Carlos does not give up and, moved by the love he feels, he overcomes the fears he has. At first he begins writing, like his grandparent, realizing he is good at it. His new journal is filled with all his thoughts and poems that he writes for Sheccid.

As time goes by, Carlos realizes he is changing. First he begins giving speeches that impress his teachers and classmates, specially the class leader, Beatriz. Of course the speeches also impress Sheccid, who is good at giving speeches too. Ariadne realizes he is a good guy and he is not a pervert, so she begins a friendship with Carlos. They become good friends and Ariadne realizes he is in love with her friend. Suddenly a new boy who goes to the same school begins to get along with Sheccid. After some time he becomes her boyfriend. Carlos dislikes the new boy, because he knows that the guy is not truly in love with Sheccid. The new guy is bigger, stronger and more popular; however, Carlos is not afraid. One day the new guy punches Sheccid and Carlos stands up for her. Sheccid likes the actions of Carlos but her boyfriend organizes a big fight between Carlos's friends and his own friends. Almost all his classmates help Carlos; however, the other guys are gang members, carrying blades and chains to the fight. The fight is unfair, but with the help of teachers, the police arrive to calm the brawl. After that, Sheccid decides to break up with her boyfriend. Everything seems to be fine until Sheccid begins to skip school. At first Carlos does not give this much importance; however, she continues to miss class. He decides to face the problem and talks with her; she says he should just forget about her, and then she kisses him. (The following part was divided and published as “El secreto de Sheccid”, Sheccid’s secret).

Desperate, Carlos asks Ariadne for help. She agrees, and then he learns that her family is going to move to another the city, apparently because the mother is ill and the father is having an affair. Before the brawl, he gave her his journal but Sheccid does not say anything else and asks him to forget her. He falls into depression because Sheccid has left him, and does not seem to feel the same way Carlos feels for her. Ariadne tells him to go to her house, to see the "real" Sheccid. After the brawl, he goes to Sheccid's house where he discovers that Sheccid has a brain tumor, and the family is leaving the city to get her special medical attention, the day after she gets out of the hospital from a very dangerous and risky surgery: the father will leave with Sheccid first, followed later by Sheccid's mom and brother. The day of the surgery, he calls Ariadne (who knows everything), only to learn that Sheccid died from complications. Ariadne gives him a letter that Sheccid left for him. In the letter, she explains him that she loved him until the last day of her life. She tells him that there were two options for her: to die during surgery, or survive and then leave to receive attention in another city. Either way, they could not be together. She confesses him she had turned him down so he would not get hurt, whatever the outcome. He then writes in his journal a poem for Sheccid, telling that she will always be a part of him, and he will always remember her the way he knew her.

This is the end of Carlos's first love, but not the end of the story. Carlos wrote "Sheccid's Secret" as a means to overcome the events that really happened. After Ariadne tells him to go see Sheccid at her house, he walks into a party. There, he sees Sheccid's mom sitting in a chair in a catatonic state. He gets introduced to Sheccid's father, who is at the party with another woman; the rumors about the problems in Sheccid's family were true. When he sees Sheccid, she is drinking, smoking and in a drug induced state, doing a dance for some men. He then faces the painful truth: he loved Justiniana because he thought of her as the embodiment of Sheccid, his ideal of the perfect woman. But Justiniana was not Sheccid. Facing this fact, he leaves the party. Heartbroken, and about to go insane, he locks himself up in his room and writes a different ending to his story; in his journal he kills Sheccid to free not only the love he felt for her, but to free himself from the pain he felt when he realized he was in love with an illusion. It is at this point that we find out that Mario, the classmate abducted by the pervert, was found alive in a car accident. The book ends with Carlos realizing that, by the love he felt, he changed for good; love made him a stronger, better person, and by keeping the innocence of his lost love, he could remain like that.

=== Sheccid ===
In the book the main character calls the new girl in his school "Sheccid". The name Sheccid comes from a story told by his grandfather. In the story a young man is sent to prison unfairly; in the jail the man began to fill his heart and mind with despair and revenge. Then Sheccid, the king's daughter, appears and her beauty and kindness make the young man regain a good-hearted nature. Finally the princess helps him escape from jail; however, the young man never told her about his feelings and the princess married another man. The moral of the story is that true love makes people grow in every way of their lives.

== Characters ==
- Jose Carlos (main carácter)
- Sheccid (Lorenna Deghemteri)
- Ariadne (Sheccid's friend)
- Adolfo (Sheccid's boyfriend)

- Beatriz (group leader)
- Mario (Jose Carlo's classmate)

== About the author ==
Carlos Cuauhtemoc Sanchez is a Mexican writer, graduated as industrial engineer. He graduated and specialized in Upper Management. He is the founder and director of leading companies in industry. As a lecturer he has given over 2,000 lectures in nearly all countries of America. He has filled the most important forums, convention centers, theaters, arenas, and stages in Mexico. He is one of the most sought-after Hispanic speakers.

=== Awards ===
The author has won some awards like the National Prize for Literature, Writer of the Year Award and Toastmaster International Award for excellence in speaking. Some awards were given to him for the creation of this work like the National Youth Award in Literature and the National Prize for Creative Minds. The Eyes of My Princess has a Best Seller International Award, with more than one million books sold.

== Approach for teenagers ==
The novel, aimed at a teenage audience, highlights the importance of human values and ethics. Sanchez shows the classic teenager troubles and mentions how to deal with them in a mature way. The author guides the reader with a story based in a Catholic background, something for which he has been recognized but at the same time criticized.
