= Vivian Vande Velde =

American novelist (born 1951)

- Born: 1951 (age 74–75); Rochester, New York, U.S.
- Occupation: Writer
- Writing career
- Genres: Children's literature, speculative fiction

Vivian Vande Velde (born 1951) is an American writer of fiction for children and young adults.

== Biography ==
Vivian Vande Velde was born in Rochester, New York, United States. She began writing at age 28, the year her daughter was born, and has been publishing relatively consistently since. She resides in Rochester. She is involved in multiple circles/groups of young writers in the Rochester area, along with authors such as Bruce Coville and Cynthia DeFelice.

Her novels and short story collections usually contain elements of horror, fantasy, and humor. Her book Never Trust a Dead Man (1999) received the 2000 Edgar Award for Best Young Adult Novel. She has said that she enjoys writing for children and young adults, stating that childhood is the shortest and most influential time of a reader's life. She does school talks for children, attends book conventions, and also gives writing classes. Her work has appeared in a number of anthologies and magazines, including Gothic! Ten Original Dark Tales, Cricket Magazine, Aboriginal Science Fiction, and Asimov's Science Fiction.

== Bibliography ==
- Once Upon A Test: Three Light Tales of Love (1984)
- A Hidden Magic (1985)
- A Well-Timed Enchantment (1990)
- User Unfriendly (1991)
- Dragon's Bait (1992)
- Tales from the Brothers Grimm and the Sisters Weird (1995)
- Companions of the Night (1995)
- Curses, Inc. and Other Stories (1996)
- The Conjurer Princess (1997)
- The Changeling Prince(1998)
- Smart Dog (1998)
- Ghost Of A Hanged Man (1998)
- A Coming Evil (1998)
- There's a Dead Person Following My Sister Around (1999)
- Never Trust a Dead Man (1999)
- Magic Can Be Murder (2000)
- Troll Teacher (2000)
- The Rumpelstiltskin Problem (2001)
- Alison, Who Went Away (2001)
- Being Dead (2001)
- Heir Apparent (2002)
- Wizard at Work (2003)
- Witch's Wishes (2003)
- Three Good Deeds (2005)
- Now You See It... (2005)
- The Book of Mordred (2005)
- Witch Dreams (2005)
- All Hallows' Eve (2006)
- Remembering Raquel (2007)
- Stolen (2008)
- Cloaked in Red (2010)
- 8 Class Pets + 1 Squirrel / (divided by) 1 Dog = Chaos (2011)
- Deadly Pink (2012)
- Frogged (2013)
- 23 Minutes (2016)
- Squirrel in the House (2016)
- The Princess Imposter (2017)
- The Prince Problem (2018)
- Squirrel in the Museum (2019)

== Linked books ==
Although Vande Velde has not created any sequels, she has made a few books that are linked in setting.

- User Unfriendly, Heir Apparent, and Deadly Pink
- The Changeling Prince and The Conjurer Princess
- 8 Class Pets and Squirrel in the House
