= Gurpreet Kaur Bhatti =

British Indian writer

- Born: 1968 or 1969 (age 56–57); Watford, United Kingdom
- Education: University of Bristol
- Occupations: Playwright, screenwriter
- Awards: Susan Smith Blackburn Prize; 2005 Behzti

Bhatti speaking at the International Conference on Free Expression and Conscience, London, 23 July 2017.

Gurpreet Kaur Bhatti (born in Watford in 1968 or 1969) is a British playwright and screenwriter. Her play Behzti (Dishonour) was cancelled by the Birmingham Repertory Theatre after protests against the play turned violent and death threats forced Bhatti to go into hiding.

== Life ==
Gurpreet Kaur Bhatti was born into a working-class Sikh Punjabi family in Watford. She went to the University of Bristol to study Chemistry but graduated with honours in Modern Languages. Before becoming a full-time playwright and screenwriter, she worked in a hospital laundry and a women’s refuge. She has also been a waitress, actor, workshop leader and a carer.

== Work ==
Bhatti's first play, Behsharam (Shameless), broke box office records at Soho Theatre and Birmingham Rep when it opened in 2001.

In 2005, Behzti (Birmingham Repertory Theatre) won the Susan Smith Blackburn Prize for the best English language play written by a woman.

In 2010, her follow-up to Behzti titled Behud (Beyond Belief) was co-produced by Soho Theatre and Coventry Belgrade and was shortlisted for the John Whiting Award.

In 2014, Khandan (Family) opened at the Birmingham Rep before transferring to the Royal Court Theatre.

In June 2014, her first anthology of plays, Plays One, was published by Oberon Books.

Bhatti's other credits include Scenes from Lost Mothers (Clean Break); Silence (Donmar Warehouse); 846 (Theatre Royal Stratford East); A Kind of People (Royal Court Downstairs); Elephant (Birmingham Repertory Theatre); Dishoom (Rifco/Watford Palace Theatre); Fourteen (Watford Palace Theatre); the feature film Everywhere And Nowhere; DCI Stone, Radio 4; Londonee (Rich Mix); Dead Meat, Channel 4 and An Enemy Of The People, BBC World Service.

She was a core writer on The Archers from 2012 to 2019, part of the team that created the ‘Helen and Rob’ domestic violence story. She has also written for EastEnders and Hollyoaks.

In 2025, her adaptation of Sathnam Sanghera’s Marriage Material was produced at the Lyric Hammersmith and her play Choir opened at Chichester Festival Theatre.

== Awards ==
- 2003 Nominated for the Race in the Media Award by the Commission for Racial Equality in the radio music/entertainment category for North East South West.
- Asian Women of Achievement awards, nominated twice
- 2005 Susan Smith Blackburn Prize, a US-based award of $10,000 made annually to the best English language play by a woman, for Behzti
- 2010 Behud (Beyond Belief) nominated for the John Whiting Award
- 2020 A Kind of People nominated for the Asian Media Awards
- 2025 Marriage Material finalist for the Asian Media Awards

== Plays ==
- Behsharam (Shameless). Oberon Books. 1 April 2002. ISBN 978-1-84002-249-0. Soho Theatre, London 2001
- Behzti (Dishonour). Oberon Books. 1 September 2005. ISBN 978-1-84002-522-4. The Door, Birmingham Rep, Birmingham, UK 2005
- Come to Where I'm From, "Come to Where I'm From – Watford". 19 December 2010., Listen to the Podcast at Painesplough
- Behud (Beyond Belief). Oberon Books. April 2010. ISBN 978-1-84943-096-8. Soho Theatre, London 2010
- Londonee, "World Premiere at Rich Mix Theatre". 25 May 2012. Archived from the original on 30 July 2012. Mukul and Ghetto Tigers and Lifeguard Productions
- Two Old Ladies, Leicester Haymarket 2000
- Fourteen (2014), "Premier at Watford Palace Theatre". 21 May 2014. Watford Palace Theatre commissioned 'Fourteen' after Gurpreet Kaur Bhatti wrote a short play for 'Come To Where I'm From' in 2010, co-produced by Watford Palace Theatre and Paines Plough
- Khandan (Family) (2014), Bhatti, Gurpreet Kaur (22 May 2014). Premiere at the Birmingham Repertory Theatre. ISBN 978-1-78319-093-5. A Royal Court Theatre and Birmingham Repertory Theatre Co-production
- "A Kind of People" (2019). Premiered at the Royal Court Theatre London.
- "Marriage Material". Adapted from Satnam Sangerha's novel, premiered at the Birmingham Rep and Lyric Hammersmith.

=== Radio, Films, TV and Teleplays ===
- Heart of Darkness (Feb 2013), Stone, BBC Radio 4
- The Archers (2012), BBC Radio 4
- Everywhere and Nowhere, feature film, 2011
- Dead Meat, half-hour film produced by Channel 4 as part of the Dogma TV season
- Stitched Up, Commissioned Series for BBC1
- Honour, single Film for BBC2
- The Cleaner, hour-long film for BBC1
- Lipstick and Nails, police drama for Great Meadow Productions
- Pound Shop Boys, originally commissioned by October Films/Film Council/Scottish Screen and developed through PAL
- Airport 2000, Leicester Haymarket / Riverside Studios
- An Enemy of the People, 2010, hour-long episode for BBC World Service
- Fourteen Units a Week, 2010, From Fact to Fiction, BBC Radio 4
- Mera Des (My Country), BBC Radio 3
- My Lithuanian Lady, BBC World Service
- Westway, over thirty episodes – 1999-2001 – of the BBC World Service Radio Drama Series
- Eastenders, BBC 1, nine episodes – 2001–2004
