= Gustav Ernst =

Austrian playwright, novelist and screenwriter (born 1944)

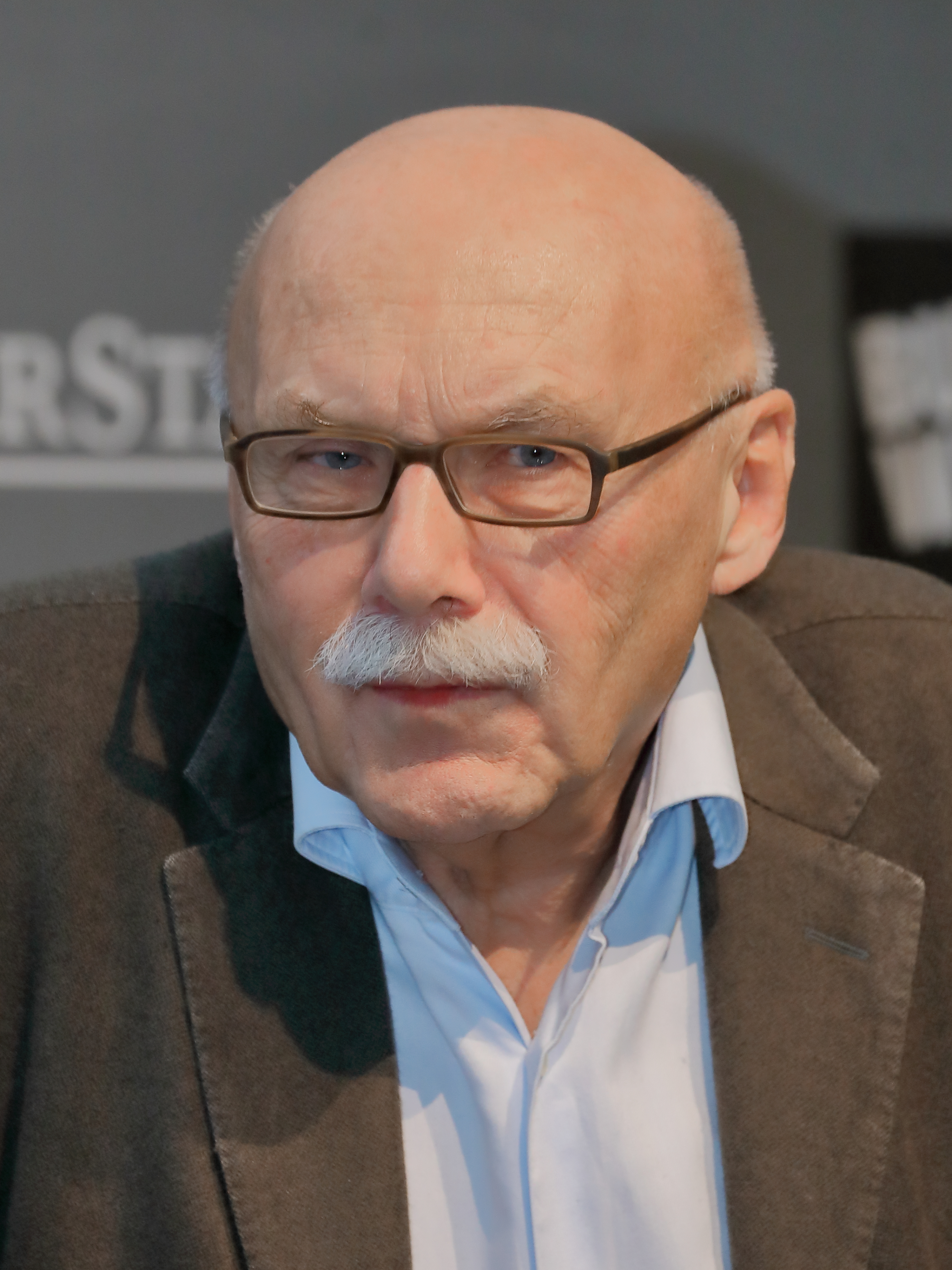
Gustav Ernst (2019)

Gustav Ernst (born 23 August 1944) is an Austrian playwright, novelist and screenwriter. He has also founded and edited two literary journals, Wespennest and kolik.

Ernst was born in Vienna, where he read Philosophy, Psychology and History at the University of Vienna. He lives in Leopoldstadt.

== Selected works ==
=== Plays ===
- Ein irrer Haß (1979)
- Mallorca (1986)
- Herzgruft (1988)
- Blutbad (1990)
- Herz ist Trumpf (1990)
- 1000 Rosen (1990)
- Ein Volksfreund (1994)
- Casino (1998)

=== Novels ===
- Einsame Klasse (1979)
- Frühling in der Via Condotti (1987)
- Trennungen (2000)
- Grado. Süße Nacht (2004)
- Grundlsee (2013)

== See also ==
- List of Austrian writers
