= Stephen Clarke (writer) =

British author (born 1958)

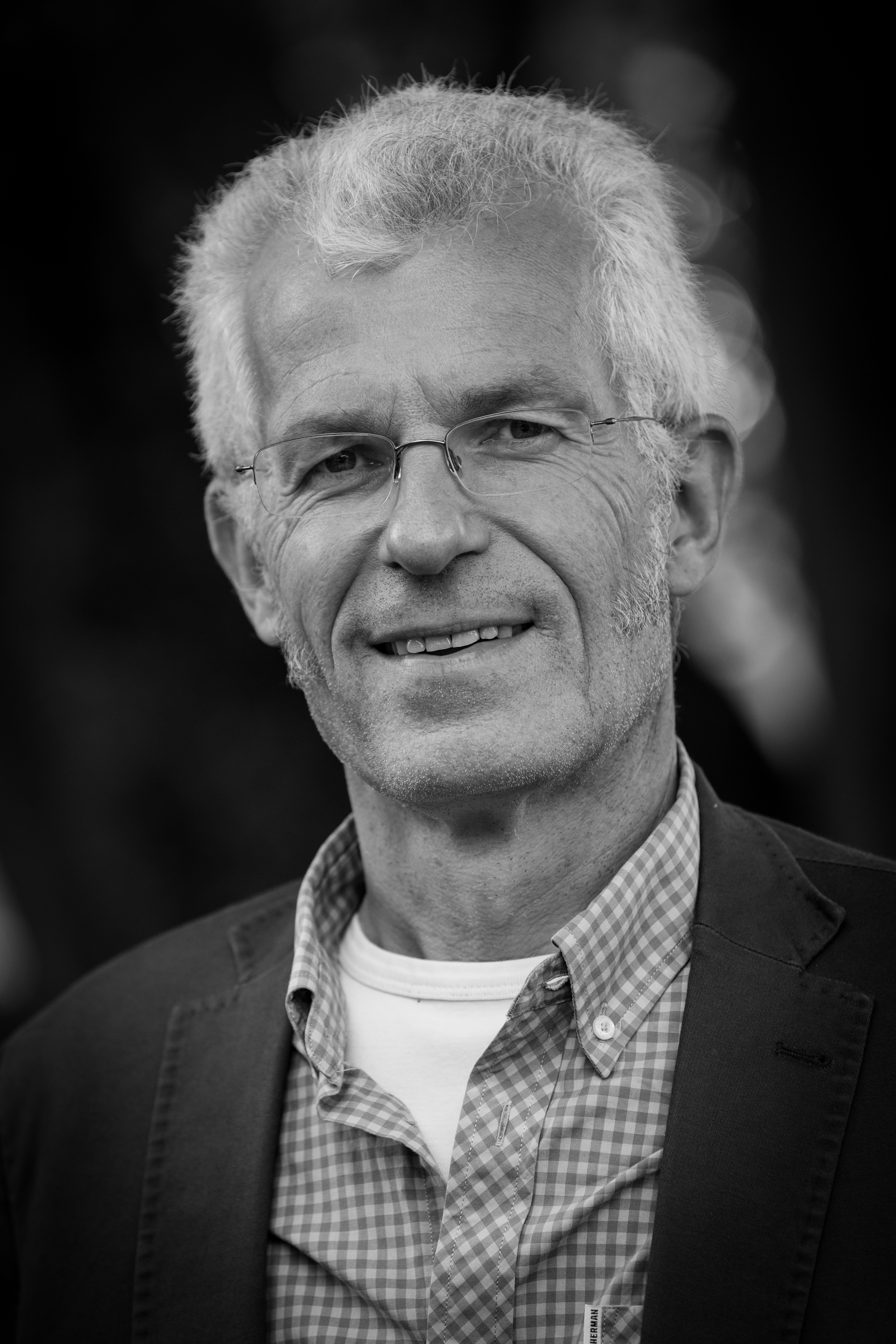
- Born: 15 October 1958 (age 68); St. Albans, Hertfordshire, England
- Occupations: Writer; author
- Writing career
- Genres: Novels, non-fiction
- Website: stephenclarkewriter.com

Stephen Clarke (born 15 October 1958) is a British author. He writes mainly about France. He published six novels featuring a British protagonist named Paul West.

== Career ==
Before writing books, Clarke wrote comedy sketches for BBC Radio 4 and comic-book stories for the U.S. cartoonist and comics artist Gilbert Shelton. Having graduated from Christ Church, Oxford University with a First in Modern Languages (French and German), he spent several years working in Glasgow as a bilingual lexicographer for the dictionary firm HarperCollins. He then moved to work for a French press group.

== Works ==
On 1 April 2004 Clarke successfully self-published A Year in the Merde. It attracted attention in France as well. Later Clarke sold the rights to Transworld in the UK, Bloomsbury Publishing PLC in the United States, Penguin in Canada and Random House in Australia. It was eventually published in altogether about 20 languages.

The sequel Merde Actually appeared in 2005, and was followed by a non-fiction book (Talk to the Snail, a humorous guide to the French language and the French) in 2006. The third novel about Paul West was published in July 2007 in the United Kingdom and one year later in the USA: Merde Happens, This time Englishman Paul West explores the United States instead of France. Clarke's fourth novel Dial M for Merde played again in France (this time South of France) and was published in the UK on 10 September 2008. The fifth novel The Merde Factor about Paul West returning to Paris was published on 13 September 2012.

Stephen Clarke's second non-fiction offering, 1000 Years of Annoying the French, was published in the United Kingdom on 18 March 2010. It concentrates on conflicts between the French and the English over the past ten centuries, In Amazon.co.uk's bestseller lists, at one point the book was simultaneously at number 4 in the history chart and number one in humour.

== Bibliography ==
=== Fiction ===
The 'Merde' Series

- A Year in the Merde European Countries (2004)
- Merde Actually (2005) - Known as In the Merde for Love in the USA.
- Merde Happens A roadtrip across Americas (2007)
- Dial M for Merde Based in the South of France (2008)
- The Merde Factor Paul West's Parisian update (2012)
- Merde in Europe Paul West's is One Brit in Brussels (2016)
- Merde at the Paris Olympics (2023)

Stand-alone

- A Brief History of the Future (2011) What if teleportation was really possible? Englishman Richie Fisher is about to find out...

=== Non-fiction ===
- Talk to the Snail (2006) An ironical survival guide to the French way of life.
- 1000 Years of Annoying the French (2010) A satirical version of British-French history.
- Paris Revealed - The Secret Life of a City (2011) A behind the scenes look of Paris.
- Dirty Bertie: An English King Made in France (2014) A biography of Edward VII
- How the French Won Waterloo (or think they did) (2016) A look at the French attitude to Waterloo
- The French Revolution and What Went Wrong (2018)
- I Did It My Ways: An 86-year-old stand-up comedian's lifelong journey from prudish Bostonian to scandalous Parisienne, and beyond (2021, with D'yan Forest)
