= Time Bites: Views and Reviews =

2004 collection of essays by Doris Lessing

- Author: Doris Lessing
- Language: English
- Subject: Essays, literary criticism, book reviews, commentaries
- Published: 2004 (Fourth Estate)
- Publication place: United Kingdom
- Media type: Print (hardback)
- Pages: 376
- ISBN: 9780007179855
- OCLC: 56649211

Time Bites: Views and Reviews is a 2004 collection of essays by Doris Lessing. It contains book reviews, literary criticism and commentaries that have appeared in various works since the 1970s.

== Reception ==
Booklist wrote "Most of her conversational, fast-moving, often wry inquiries into literature, politics, and ethics were originally published in England, hence little known in America, a lack redressed in this generous and pleasurable collection. Knowing books as intimately as she does, and caring deeply about reading and writing, Lessing pens critical essays that are vibrant and illuminating, with quotable lines on every page." and the Library Journal stated "Lessing comments cleverly on the classic novelists (e.g., Leo Tolstoy), but some of the most interesting pieces are centered on less well known or virtually forgotten writers. There are quite a few essays on the Sufi author Idries Shah (1924-96); other topics Lessing covers range from politics to cats."

Kirkus Reviews wrote "While this collection of random journalism—some dating back to 1974, but most from the past decade—has the inevitable repetitions and a rather scattershot feel, it still gives a nice sense of Lessing’s character and commitments in vigorous old age." Publishers Weekly wrote "The main theme, whether addressed overtly or underlying her literary criticism, is the indispensable place of books in the life of an educated person and an enlightened culture. Hers is a clarion call."

Time Bites has also been reviewed by The New York Review of Books, and The Daily Telegraph.
