= A Year in the Merde =

2005 novel by Stephen Clarke

- Cover art to the first US edition
- Author: Stephen Clarke
- Language: English
- Series: Paul West novels
- Genre: Humor, Autobiography
- Published: 2005 (New York: Bloomsbury)
- Media type: Book
- Pages: 276
- ISBN: 9781582345918
- OCLC: 57506540
- Followed by: Merde, Actually

A Year in the Merde is a comic novel by Stephen Clarke first published in 2004 under the pen name Paul West. In later editions, the author's real identity was revealed. In France, the book title is God save la France.

Paul West is in fact the first-person narrator, a 27-year-old Englishman, single and unattached, who is recruited by a French entrepreneur and given a one-year contract in Paris to plan and organise a chain of tea rooms which his employer wants to open in the French capital. The novel covers fictional events of that year, starting in September 2002 and ending in the summer of 2003.

Set at the time of the 2003 invasion of Iraq, A Year in the Merde is about the cultural differences between the British and the French, which are somewhat heightened by the war, especially by the opposing views on the invasion held by Blair and Chirac respectively. The French reaction to the strong anti-French sentiment in the United States is also captured in the novel.

The book also brings out the ambivalent attitude of the French towards the citizens of their capital, Paris, which is treated almost as a foreign country. The character Paul in his attempts to assimilate (mainly to improve his sex-life) also contrasts other aspects of French society, in particular French bureaucracy and higher education, with the "system" in Britain.

A sequel, Merde Actually (In the Merde for Love in the USA), was published in 2005. As it suggests, the title is based on the film Love Actually. A second sequel, Merde Happens, was published in the UK in 2007 and was released in the US in the summer of 2008. A fourth book, Dial M for Merde, was released in the UK in September 2008.

== Explanation of the novel's title ==
The title of the book refers, in a metaphorical way, to all the difficult situations Paul West finds himself in during his stay in France, but also, literally, to the huge amount of dog excrement that can be found in the streets of Paris in this fiction. "A Year in the Merde" is also an allusion to A Year in Provence by Peter Mayle, an earlier work on Anglo-French cultural relations.

In the same way, the title Merde Actually is a further allusion to the film Love Actually (2003) starring Hugh Grant. In both cases there is a vein of light comedy exploited by director and author respectively. There is the additional coincidence that Love Actually came out in the year in which Stephen Clarke was writing A Year in the Merde and its sequel Merde Actually, and relating it to the war in Iraq which was staged at that time – to the detriment of Franco- US relations.

== Plot summary ==
When Paul West starts his new job in September he is altogether unaware of the true character and the machinations of his boss, Jean-Marie Martin, who is in his early fifties, rich, handsome, impeccably dressed, friendly, and prepared to pay him a good salary. West does not know yet that Martin, officially decorated for supporting the French economy, is illegally importing cheap British beef (the ban imposed during the BSE crisis not having been lifted yet); that through his political connections he has secured for his daughter Élodie a cheap, council-subsidised HLM apartment; that he associates with the far right; that, although married, he is having an affair with someone from the office; and that he wants to sell him, Paul West, a cottage in the country quite close to the site of a future nuclear power plant.

West is allotted a motley crew who are supposed to work together on his project. However, everyone, including Martin, turns out to be very reluctant to learn what West has to tell them, for example that "My Tea Is Rich" is not a good name for a chain of English tea rooms. Soon West realises that no one is following his orders, that nothing is happening, that he is being paid for doing, or at least achieving, absolutely nothing. In the end, his contract is prematurely terminated, and he spends some weeks teaching English. ("It was much tougher than working in an office. You can't e-mail your mates while standing in front of a class.")

His love life during that year is an emotional rollercoaster ride. In all, West has sex with four different women during that year: Élodie, his boss's daughter; Alexa, who eventually cannot put up with his apolitical outlook on life; Marie, a black girl who willingly drops him when her boyfriend returns from abroad; and Florence, half Indian, the girl with whom he plans to open his own tea room in Paris at the end of the novel.

== See also ==
- Pierre Daninos
