= The Minds of Marginalized Black Men =

2007 book by Alford A. Young Jr.

- Author: Alford A. Young Jr.
- Language: English
- Subject: Sociology
- Genre: Non-fiction
- Publisher: Princeton University Press
- Publication date: 2007
- Publication place: United States
- Media type: Paperback
- Pages: 288 pp
- ISBN: 978-0-691-09242-3
- OCLC: 51647824
- Dewey Decimal: 305.38/896073/077311 21
- LC Class: HV4046.C36 .Y68 2004

The Minds of Marginalized Black Men is a non-fiction book written by Alford A. Young Jr. Young explores the lives of impoverished young black men living in the near New West Side of Chicago, Illinois, in order to get a better understanding of how they view their lives and what they want for their futures. The book was first published in 2004 by Princeton University Press.

== Reception ==
The book received a generally positive reception, garnering reviews from academic journals including Contemporary Sociology, Gender & Society, Journal of Urban Affairs, and the American Journal of Sociology.

== Characters ==
Larry - A 24-year-old male who has never held a full-time job for longer than a month or two. Because he cannot find and hold a job, he still lives at home with his parents and siblings.

Devin - A 21-year-old active gang member who is on parole for possession of narcotics. He has been a part of many illicit activities such as selling drugs and theft. Devin has never held any form of a job in his life.

Casey - A 25-year-old ex-convict who just got out of drug rehabilitation for an addiction that started when he was a teenager. He had a job as a bag boy at a local supermarket but besides that the majority of his income came from hustling and drug dealing.

Lester - Grew up with both parents, and had a plan to excel in his future. Unfortunately his parents were criminals, and once his father was incarcerated he had to stop focusing on school and start focusing on survival. It was then that he resorted to becoming a drug dealer.

Earl - Comes from a family that was unfamiliar with college because nobody was fortunate enough to have experienced it. He moved to Near West from Mississippi, and was often teased and picked on as an adolescent. Eventually Earl found a sense of security from being an outsider by joining a gang.

Jake - Was one of few to receive his high school diploma. Unfortunately, college was out of the question as his family did not have the finances to help him out. Eventually Jake fell into the easy money-making system of drug dealing.

Barry - He stayed away from gangs growing up, and was able to receive his high school diploma, but he got caught up in drug dealing to make quick and easy cash during the summer shortly following his graduation. He eventually stopped when the police were catching on to him, and drug dealing gangs wanted him dead.

Donald - Worked many different jobs during his adolescent years, but was unable to keep any of them for very long. Eventually being desperate for money led him down the path of drug dealing.

Gus - A high school football star who had plans to participate in the army. Unfortunately his addiction to cocaine hurt his athleticism, and got him kicked out of the military. He eventually came back to Near West, where he began dealing drugs.

Tito - A survivor of Near West Side who was able to work with a moving company for a short period of time. Eventually he began gangbanging, and was incarcerated.

== Synopsis ==
Introduction - Making New Sense of Poor Black Men in Crisis

The introduction gives insight on what is to come later in the book. It also describes the setting and how Young did his research.

Young conducted his research in several public housing developments in the Near West Side of Chicago. Young describes the area as "geographically and socially isolated from downtown Chicago and the opulent western suburbs, and resembles a holding pen for the economically immobile."

The first development that Young went to was the Governor Henry Horner Homes. The development had "19 buildings with 1,774 units, almost all of which are occupied by African Americans." In these households over 85% received public assistance, and only 8% were able to be supported by the employment of a member of the household.

The second development was the ABLA homes located one and a half miles away from the Henry Horner Homes. This development contains 160 buildings with 3,505 units and, like the Henry Horner homes, is almost all African-American. ABLA occupants do a little better financially, with 75% needing public assistance and just over 8% able to support themselves.

The second half of the introduction talks about what made Young want to research and write this book and what the main themes of the book are. Young says that the main goal of this book is to "uncover these men's worldviews on issues such as mobility, opportunity, and future life chances." The book is not about what was going through these men's heads when they were dealing drugs or carrying a firearm but instead about how they view their place in American society and what they think about their futures.

Chapter 1 - The Past and Future of the Cultural Analysis of Black Men

Chapter 1 starts off by going into the idea of "the crisis of the black male", which is the idea that the rate of crime and incarceration among blacks is directly connected to their high rate of unemployment. Young attributes the crisis to two key factors: structural factors such as race-based residential segregations and mobility prospect, and cultural factors such as attitudes and behaviors that prevent acceptance into the work world.

Young then talks about how most research on poor black males only focuses on behavioral traits and their value systems. He says that good research would also include a deep analysis of how these men create their worldviews and beliefs regarding the present and future. Cultural analysis is the topic of a huge debate right now. On one side "the debate asks whether black men adopt or promote distinct cultural patters that contribute to, if not cause altogether, their demise."

The other side questions "whether these men, who are taken to be cultural actors in the ways that other groups of Americans are, might simply experience unique life circumstances and conditions that overdetermine the social outcomes comprising their everyday lives." Young then finishes off the chapter talking about social isolation which is the idea that these poor young black men are unable to get jobs because their class standing keeps them away from mainstream society. They are isolated from the areas where the jobs and opportunities are.

Chapter 2 - Time, Space, and Everyday Living

Chapter 2 looks at the everyday lives of these men. Uncertainty is a common feeling for them because each day they must worry about whether they will have a job or even make it through the day. One thing in this chapter that really surprised Young was the men's inability to manage time. They would show up late, extremely early, or even on the wrong days to interviews. These men do not have to deal with appointments on an everyday basis because on the majority of their days they have nothing to do, so they do not know how to handle appointments.

Young brings up the concept of Habitus, which is a "system of durable, transposable dispositions, structured structures predisposed to function as structuring structures, that is, as principles which generate and organize practices and representations that can be objectively adapted to their outcomes without presupposing a conscious aiming at ends or an express mastery of the operations necessary in order to attain them." Essentially, the way people think and act is related to the social constraints and structures around them.

Young gives the example of how the use of violence in order to defend oneself is a justifiable in certain situations. Young was surprised by how much these people have to deal with violence. He talks about how in most communities violence is rare but in the Near West Side it has become part of the daily lives of the people. Most people only feel unsafe when they go out late at night but people in the Near West Side fear violence all day, even in their own homes.

Chapter 3 - Coming Up Poor

Coming Up Poor addresses the issue of young African-American men developing their futures through the obstacles of growing up in Near West Side. The most common obstacles that most of the men experienced were the lack of decent finances, a father figure, a sense of security, and the proper information to lead them to college. Young men are interviewed and asked to describe what it was like trying to grow up in the community and what kind of support they received from their family to pursue an education beyond high school.

When discussing their upbringing the men speak of how the community was extremely violent, and quite often the children in elementary school had other things on their mind other than getting a quality education. Survival of the gang-infested area, the home that was full of stress and anxiety due to the lack of money, and earning the respect of peers no matter what it took were the main focuses of these adolescents. When asked about their parental figures' attitude towards achieving a higher level of education, they all had the same answer. All of the parents stressed how important it was to receive a quality education and stay off the streets and out of gangs. Although their parents wanted nothing more for their children but to grow up and do something with their life, they were unable to provide concrete information or help to guide the children in the correct direction.

Some parents overprotected their children to the point where the children would sneak out to the streets and be exposed to gang violence. One often found a sense of safety and security only in joining a gang to avoid being the recipient of a soft reputation. To find security in the streets one had to gain the respect of one's peers. When kids are bullying, stealing, and dealing drugs when in elementary school, the future for that generation is limited to those who can stay away and deal with the conflicts another way. The local high school had an enrollment of 97 percent African Americans, and during the 1980s the percent who received a high school diploma only ranged from 15 percent to no more than 30 percent.

The high school could not provide what one would call a safe and educational learning environment for many different reasons. During daily instruction students would have to halt their studies and duck beneath their desks because of gunfire in the streets. With instability such as this one can only imagine the quality of an education that a student could receive, which is why the percent of students who went on to attend college ranged from 10 percent to no more than 40 percent. This does not mean that those eligible to go to college were able to afford it, considering that 95 percent of the students came from low-income families that needed financial assistance to survive.

Once these boys became men and were still stuck in the city, they believed that they had survived the most challenging part of growing up. Now they were off to the workforce, where many were unable to keep steady jobs. With the morals and mindsets that the men had acquired growing up, they faced difficulty keeping their jobs as they valued the respect of their employees more than the importance of getting the job done. The men are extremely affected by their adolescent years and are now struggling to provide for children of their own. This cycle seems to continue as the elders always stress the importance of a quality education; the only challenge is learning how to get it.

Chapter 4 - Framing Social Reality: Stratification and Inequality

Chapter 4 focuses on determining what the men's interpretive thoughts are on characteristics of society such as power, hierarchy, and social relations across race and class lines. The author mainly focuses on each of the men's personal experiences. By analyzing their differences in opinions, the author strives to figure out how differences in personal experiences connect to the kinds of interpretations that the men have.

Barry received his high school diploma but fell into the unfortunate act of drug dealing soon after graduating. He talks about how much he regrets doing it, but he needed the money then, and that was the easiest way to get it. When asked if he believed that discrimination existed, he was the only one that did not believe that it was present. He believed that you are discriminated against only if you allow yourself to be. In other words, he was saying that you determine your own fate. Barry believed that he could have done something far better with his life had he only refused to take no for an answer and been more determined. Despite Barry's position, he had so little to say about the existence of discrimination obstacles and barriers towards upward mobility.

Donald, another man who was interviewed, had a completely different outlook on these questions. Donald grew up working small jobs at a variety of businesses and although he was not a part of the wealthier society, he viewed it from his position. He stated that he witnessed racism and discrimination all the time, and he believes that was why he was fired from some of his jobs. He believes that as long as there are different wealth classes these unfortunate aspects of society are always going to remain.

Chapter 5 - Framing Individual Mobility and Attainment

Chapter 5 addresses the recurring thoughts about how low-income African-American men make sense of mobility and attainment in American society. Its main focus is to help determining what we can do to enhance these men's thoughts on advancement in society. Through the information acquired during the interviews, it seems as though the men's ability to imagine aspects of life that are present further out in society such as mobility barriers and discrimination are often limited by what they have experienced in Near West Side.

The men were asked about their thoughts of mobility and attainment in the country, and they were mostly split into two categories. Those who knew little about it and did not have much to say, and those who had passionate responses towards why they believed there were barriers and discrimination in society. Half of the men had not been fortunate enough to have a job because of their lack of motivation or qualifications.

These men who had always been unemployed were least likely to speak of the role that outside forces play in shaping a person's chances in life. On the other hand, the men that were a part of some sort of employment had completely different thoughts on mobility and attainment. Often, the men with more work experience had experienced social conflicts themselves and were able to talk thoroughly about their beliefs on how the role of external factors affect an individual's chances in life.

Chapter 6 - Looking Up from Below: Framing Personal Reality

Chapter 6 focuses on self-identification: discovering and stating who you are as a person; understanding what you want your mission in life and goals to be; and how to mobilize oneself in society in order to achieve these goals. Different aspects of the stereotypical ideal future or "good life" are mentioned. This ideal future mentioned touches on the three spheres of life: work, home, and individual well-being. In this stage of self-identification, a specific profession is not addressed; instead the goal is to attain whatever fits the individual's definition of a well-paying job.

There is a strong emphasis on personal mobility and opportunity as the basis for aspirations or the "ideal" future. The author touches on the essential points of using any resources that are possible in order to mobilize yourself on a small scale, and to in time give yourself an opportunity on a larger scale. An example given is of Arthur working at a liquor store to get an idea of how to set up his own business. The author analyzes the men's lack of social capital in the world of work, and says the men are disadvantaged in the human capital of strategic skills and talents.

The world of work is shown as a world of education, brainpower, skill, and credentials, which are resources for success in the working world. The attributes of strength and physical stamina have very little importance in the white-collar environment. The author notes that the men's perceptions of their own skills would limit them to minimally skilled positions.

Chapter 7 - Getting There: Navigating Personal Mobility

Chapter 7 focuses on aspects of personal mobility, personal impediments to getting ahead, and the special place of race in class. Chapter seven briefly touches on and concludes the men's discussion on the modern-day America and the American Dream. They touch on the emphasizing factors of discipline, hard work, education, and motivation.

The men believe that a high school diploma is a bare essential towards minimal success in the working world, but that the only useful education was direct training to one's career interests. The men then move on to confronting and acknowledging their own self-induced barriers. Men like Gus and Casey talk about their struggles with substance abuse, and the problems that it caused for them regarding motivation and finding work.

The men who had been previously incarcerated such as Devin, Earl, Lester, and Casey, talk about the difficulty of finding work with a criminal record. The men then discuss the difficulty of personal mobility. They discuss how being African-American puts them in a lower class, with fewer resources and opportunities, thus making it harder for them to mobilize and to make something of themselves.

Chapter 8 - Recasting the Crisis of Poor Black Men

Chapter 8 starts off with some funny yet interesting words from a man by the name of Vance Smith. Smith said: "That's retarded to think that [black men do not know how to take control of their lives]. People actually think like that? I mean, people with Ph.D's and shit." People who think that black men cannot be responsible for their lives are extremely wrong. This book has shown us that these poor black men have plans to improve themselves and have hopes and dreams they just lack the skills and capital to better themselves. They are many things that need to be done before these people can live better lives.

A key one would be a stable labor market with good job training. But the likelihood of that happening is small because the majority of people view this community with the idea of "three strikes and you're out." That these people had their chance and chose to cheat and therefore put themselves in the situation that they are in and we should not have to help them. The last main point in the book is that as times change and their situation changes the way researchers and people view that area needs to change with it otherwise they will never be able to get out of the hole that they are in.
