= The Temptation of the Impossible =

First edition (Spanish)

The Temptation of the Impossible (Spanish: La tentación de lo imposible, 2004) is a book-length essay by Peruvian novelist Mario Vargas Llosa which examines Victor Hugo's Les Misérables.

An English translation was published in 2007.

== Reviews ==
- Robb, Graham (June 28, 2007). "In his nightmare city". The New York Review of Books. 54 (11): 52–54.
