= Elana Greenfield =

American dramatist

- Born: New York City, U.S.
- Occupation: Playwright; writer
- Education: Sarah Lawrence College; Brown University (MFA)
- Genre: Short story
- Notable awards: Whiting Award (2004)

Elana Greenfield (born New York City) is an American playwright, and short story writer.

== Life ==
Greenfield was raised in Israel. She graduated from Sarah Lawrence College, and from Brown University with an MFA. She was Artistic Director of New Dramatists. Currently, she teaches dramatic writing at The New School, in the Eugene Lang College division. She formerly taught the same subject at New York University.

Her work has appeared in Bomb and The Brooklyn Rail.

== Awards ==
- 2004 Whiting Award

== Works ==
=== Short stories ===
- At the Damascus Gate: Short Hallucinations. Green Integer Series. 2003. ISBN 978-1-931243-49-0.

=== Plays ===
- Nine Come, Trinity Repertory Company, Providence, RI (1998).

=== Radio plays ===
- "Possessed by a Demon: Two Tales of the Devil," was produced for public radio and also presented at the New York Shakespeare Festival/Public Theater as part of the New Works project.

=== Anthologies ===
- Mac Wellman; Young Jean Lee, eds. (2006). "Nine Come". New downtown now: an anthology of new theater from downtown New York. University of Minnesota Press. ISBN 978-0-8166-4731-6.
