= Milt Thomas =

American novelist (born 1942)

- Born: New York City, U.S.
- Occupations: Author, novelist

Milt Thomas is a United States author and novelist. After 21 years in the music industry, Thomas began a writing career at age 50. His biography of Hugh B. Cave, Cave of a Thousand Tales, was nominated for an International Horror Guild Award in 2004.
