= Allison Glock =

American non-fiction writer

- Born: West Virginia, U.S.
- Education: Indiana University Bloomington; Syracuse University (MA)
- Occupation: Writer
- Writing career
- Genre: Non-fiction
- Notable awards: Whiting Award (2004)

Allison Glock is an American non-fiction writer.

== Life ==
Glock was born in West Virginia. She graduated from Indiana University Bloomington in 1989, and from Syracuse University with an MA in 1992.

Her work has appeared in The New York Times, The New York Times Magazine, Esquire, GQ, Maxim, Men's Journal, The New Yorker, Food & Wine, Elle, Garden & Gun, Oprah Magazine, Marie Claire, Rolling Stone.

She is a Senior Staff Writer for ESPN.

She was covered by The Guardian and other outlets for marrying a trans man.

She wrote a novel named Changers.

== Awards ==
- 2004 Whiting Award

== Works ==
- "I Blame Blogs", Poetry Foundation, 5.15.09
- Glock, Allison (October 16, 2006). "Halloween on Heels". The New York Times.
- "Sweet Tea: A Love Story", Garden & Gun
- "Perfect Fit: The Right Bra", The New Yorker, March 19, 2001
- Beauty Before Comfort. Alfred A. Knopf. 2003. ISBN 978-0-375-40121-3.
- Clay Aiken; Allison Glock (2005). Learning to Sing: Hearing the Music in Your Life. Random House, Inc. ISBN 978-0-8129-7410-2. "Allison Glock."
