= Behzti =

- Original language: English
- Written by: Gurpreet Kaur Bhatti
- Characters: Min, Balbir, Mr Sandhu, Polly Dhodhar, Teetee Parmar, Elvis
- Genre: Black comedy, drama

Premiere
- Date: 18 December 2004
- Place: Birmingham, England

Behzti (Punjabi ਬੇਇੱਜ਼ਤੀ, Dishonour) is a play written by the British Sikh playwright Gurpreet Kaur Bhatti. The play sparked controversy in the United Kingdom in December 2004. A controversial scene set in a Gurdwara (Sikh temple) included scenes of rape, physical abuse and murder, with some members of the Sikh community finding the play deeply offensive to their faith. On the opening night, 18 December 2004, at the Birmingham Repertory Theatre (The Rep), in Birmingham, England, a protest was organised by local Sikh leaders which turned violent, with the Rep cancelling performances of the play two days later. The case became part of a wider discussion in Britain about the limits of free speech and whether this can be curtailed where it offends the faith of religious groups.

== Plot ==
The plot revolves around the elderly Balbir and her daughter Min who have a difficult and tempestuous relationship. Though both Sikhs, they have been largely ostracised from the local Sikh community following the suicide of Balbir's husband Tej some years before. Seeking to secure her daughter's future, Balbir presses Mr Sandhu, a respected figure in the local gurdwara, to look into potential marriage partners for her daughter. Subsequently, it emerges that Mr Sandhu had been conducting a gay affair with Tej, and that Tej had killed himself out of shame that it would be revealed. Mr Sandhu goes on to rape Min in the gurdwara, though this is covered up by others in the temple. Balbir later kills Mr Sandhu with a kirpan, and Min forms a relationship with Elvis, her mother's black care-worker.

== Cancellation ==
The opening night performance on 18 December 2004 was cancelled after violence erupted among protesters gathered around the theatre. Three people were arrested for public order offences and three police officers were injured. The Sikh protest organisers stated that they did not support the violence of a minority of protesters, and stated they would be happy to see minor changes in the script so that the play was not set in a Sikh gurdwara.

Sewa Singh Mandla, organiser of the protest and chairman of the Council of Sikh Gurdwaras in Birmingham, stated:

In a Sikh temple, sexual abuse does not take place, kissing and dancing don't take place, rape doesn't take place, homosexual activity doesn't take place, murders do not take place.

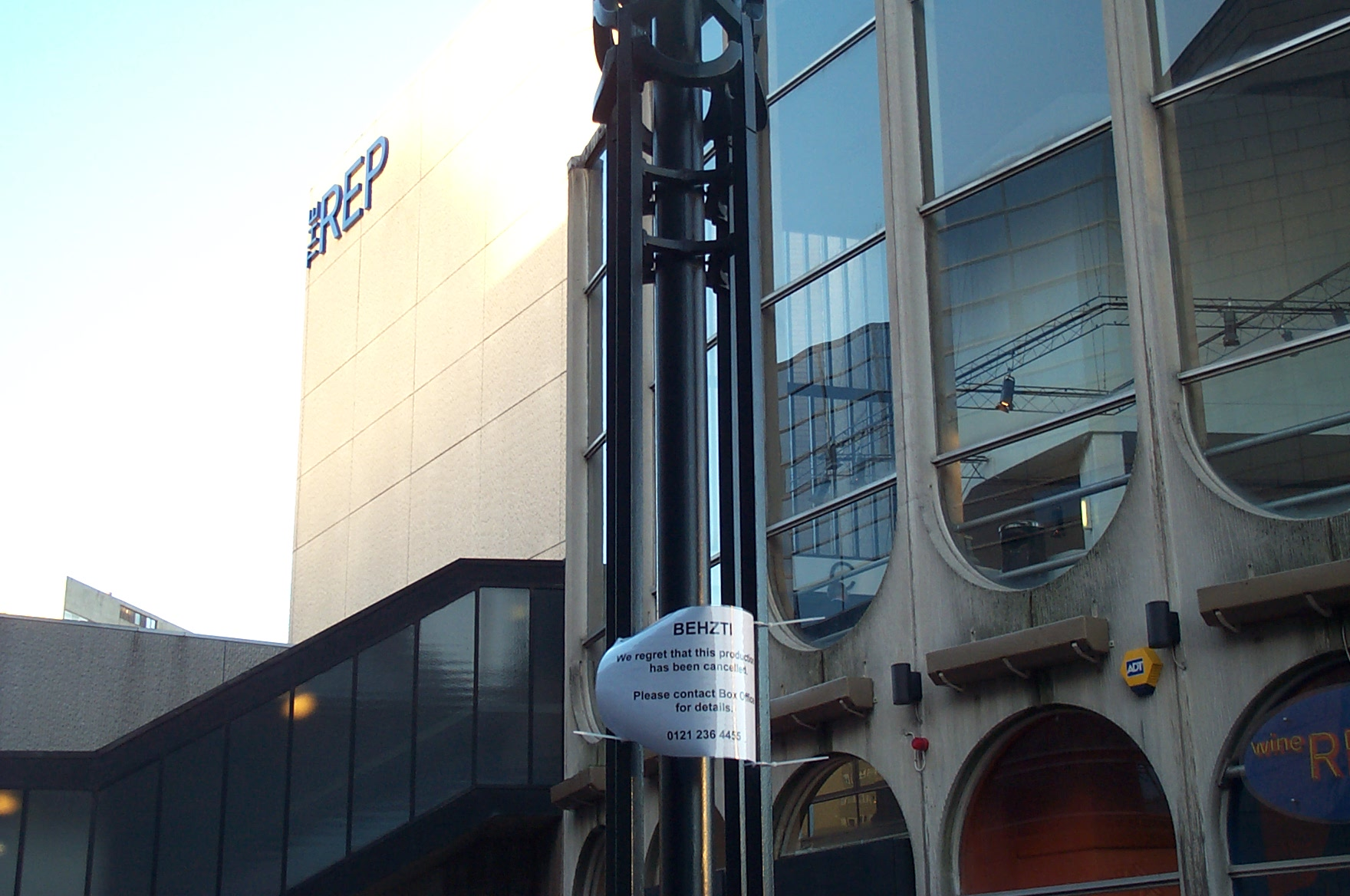
Cancellation notice of the play at the Birmingham Rep

On 20 December 2004, after an emergency meeting of the theatre management and discussions involving the local Sikh community, West Midlands Police and the Commission for Racial Equality, The Rep decided to cancel the play.

== Response to protest and cancellation ==
Supporters of the play said the cancellation was an affront to freedom of speech. More than 700 arts figures, including Prunella Scales, Tariq Ali, Terry Jones, Andrew Motion, Jude Kelly, Richard Eyre, Ayub Khan-Din, Willy Russell, Jonathan Coe, Sheila Hancock, Timothy West, and Samuel West signed a letter in support of the playwright. The letter read, in part:

We all have the right to protest peacefully if a work of art offends us. We do not have the right to use violence and intimidation to prevent that work of art from being seen by others.

Gurharpal Singh, professor of inter-religious relations at the University of Birmingham, writing in The Guardian, criticised the protestors for promoting an essentially outdated view of Sikhs rooted in the concerns of early Sikh migrants rather than the modern British-born Sikh youth, and the Labour government of Tony Blair as backing the "promotion of religion in public life", ignoring internal tensions in communities and stifling dissent.

The author responded

Religion and art have collided for centuries, and will carry on doing battle long after my play and I are forgotten. The tension between who I am, a British-born Sikh woman, and what I do, which is write drama, is at the heart of the matter. These questions of how differences in perspective and belief are negotiated in Britain today will, I hope, continue to bring about a lively and vital debate.

Stephen Glover, writing for The Daily Mail, as reported by The Skih Times, commented that while deploring censorship, he did feel a "degree of sympathy for the Sikhs", and found it hard "not to admire" the defence of their beliefs.

Sarita Malik, writing for ArtsProfessional magazine, noted that the reaction to Behzti showed a sharp divide between minorities and the art community.

One protester, Pritpal Singh, unsuccessfully appealed his conviction, arguing that the assembly was legal and that his rights were violated by the order to disperse. Lady Justice Hallett, speaking for the majority, said the defendant's claim failed to address the rights of those who were frightened or endangered by the protest.

== Reception ==
Jasdev Singh Rai, director of the Sikh Human Rights Group, writing for The Guardian, criticised the play as sensationalist. He stated that "the gurdwara is where the [Sikh holy book] Guru [Granth Sahib] is in residence, and therefore has a different significance than a synagogue, a church or a mosque" and that by depicting a rape there Bhatti "disrespected the sanctity of the Guru." Rai defends the "subjective inscrutability of sacred icons" and cites the work of Jacques Derrida and Michel Foucault in their criticisms of "the constructed paradigms of rationalism". He states that "freedoms are never absolute, least of all in multicultural, multiracial societies where responsibilities to co-exist must limit them" and concludes that "the legacy of colonialism lingers, now disguised as a defence of 'free speech'. Ironically, it finds its most xenophobic expression among liberals."

Helen Cross, writing in The Birmingham Post, described Behzti as "a terrific new play". She went on to say that it was "offensive, and furious and bloodthirsty and angry in all the right places." She noted that much of the action took place in a Gurdwara, and described the play as a "searing comedy" that included rape, abuse, murder, but was "hugely funny, touching and tremendously important." She further credited the writer's ability to "expose hypocrisy and pretence where they find it."

Christie Davies, in an essay published by the Social Affairs Unit, an NGO, noted that he had not seen the play, but that he had read it, and could "imagine" how it could be performed. Davies described it as a "clumsy patch-work quilt with weak and hurried stitching."

Asians in Media magazine said of the play: "If you're looking for some witty and thought provoking drama then Behzti is definitely for you. Gurpreet's new play is set in a Gurdwara (Sikh Temple) and explores a number of themes with a variety of interesting characters. "

In 2005 Behzti won the Susan Smith Blackburn Prize for the best play written by a woman in the English language.

The play has been translated into French by Rudi Bekaert and performed in Brussels on 16 November 2005. It was produced in Belgium and France in October–December 2006. It was published (in French) by the theatre publishing house Les Solitaires Intempestifs.

Mohan Singh, a local Sikh community leader, said: "When they're doing a play about a Sikh priest raping somebody inside a gurdwara, would any religion take it?"

The Roman Catholic Archbishop of Birmingham, Vincent Nichols, said the play was offensive to people of all faiths: "The right to freedom of expression has corresponding duties to the common good. Such a deliberate, even if fictional, violation of the sacred place of the Sikh religion demeans the sacred places of every religion."

The cancellation of the play is discussed in Nigel Warburton's 2009 book Free Speech: A Very Short Introduction, where he states that "the effects of the storming of the theatre are far wider than the particular case: the danger of such episodes is that they cause writers to self-censor for fear of violence."
