= Funerals and Fly Fishing =

2004 book by Mary Bartek

- Author: Mary Bartek
- Publisher: Henry Holt & Co.
- Publication date: September 1, 2004
- ISBN: 0-8050-7409-0

Funerals and Fly Fishing is a children's novel by American author Mary Bartek, first published by Henry Holt and Company in 2004. It follows Brad Stanislawski,a bullied, tall, sixth grade, who, at the beginning of the book, is happy for school to be over. When he meets with his mother, he finds out that he must visit his grandfather, a man that he has never met, in Pennsylvania.

Kirkus Reviews refers to Funerals and Fly Fishing as an "amusing, touching first-person narrative", noting that "readers will see there’s a lot more to funerals and fly-fishing than meets the eye."

In 2006, the novel was nominated for the Mark Twain Award and the Georgia Book Award.
