= The Rocklopedia Fakebandica =

2004 book by T. Mike Childs

- Author: T. Mike Childs
- Language: English
- Genre: Non-fiction
- Publication date: November 6, 2004

The Rocklopedia Fakebandica, by T. Mike Childs, is an illustrated encyclopedia of fictional musical groups and musicians, as seen in movies and television. It was officially released November 6, 2004. The book catalogs such fake bands as Spinal Tap, The Blues Brothers, The Rutles, and The Chipmunks, along with less well known ones.

The book grew out of a website started by the author in 2000. The website includes fictional bands from other sources, such as books and TV commercials, as well as bands not found in the book. On April 1, 2024, The Rocklopedia Fakebandica podcast debuted on both Apple Podcasts and Spotify. Hosted by T. Mike Childs, Charles Rempel and Alan Benson, the podcast explores the definition of fake bands, and continues to discuss entries from the book and website.
