= Adrien Goetz =

French professor and art critic

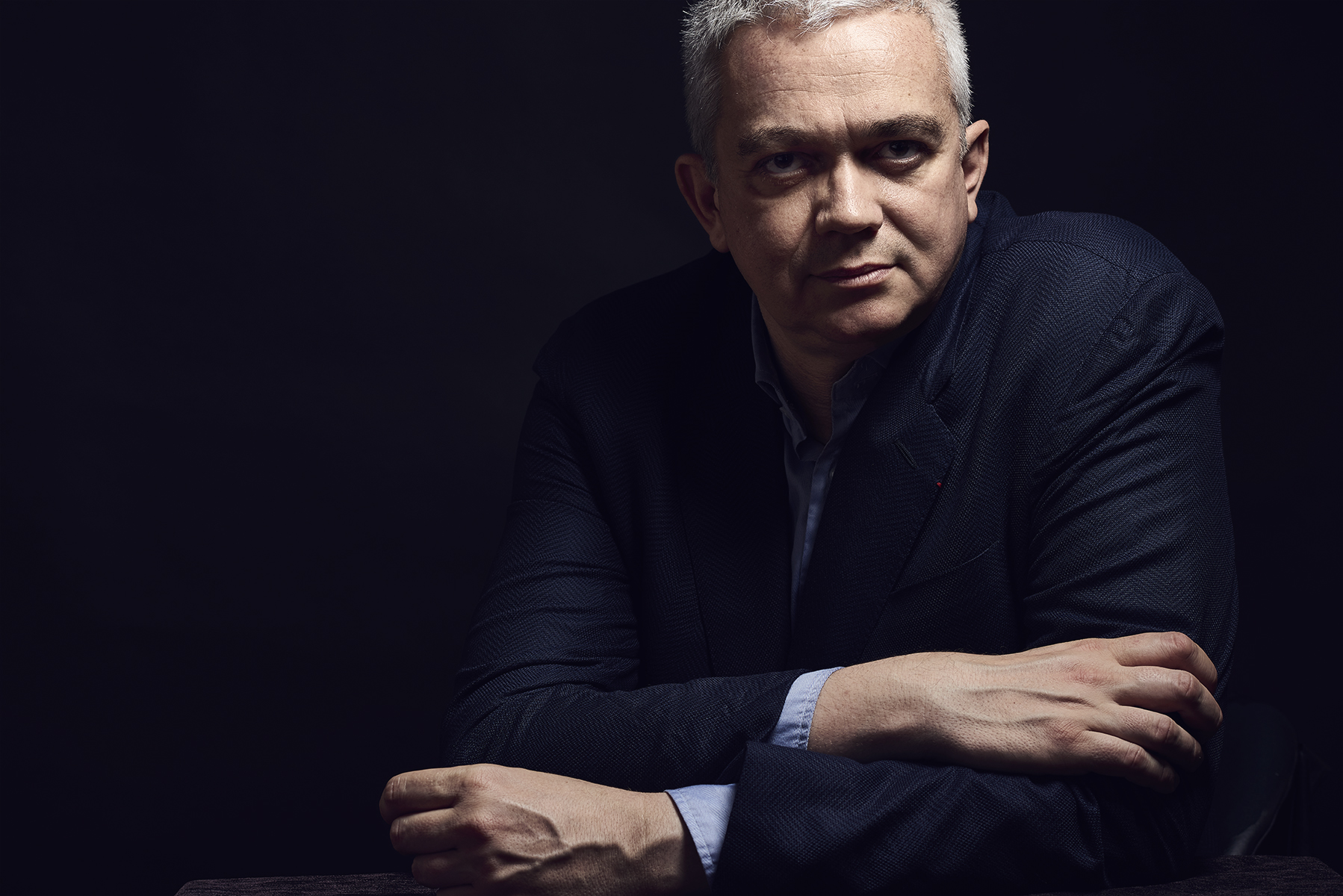
- Born: 10 February 1966 (age 60); Caen, France
- Education: École Normale Supérieure
- Occupation: Writer

Adrien Goetz (born 1966 in Caen, Calvados) is a French Art History Professor, art critic and novelist. He graduated from the École Normale Supérieure. His work appeared in Zurban, and Beaux-Arts Magazine. He is Lecturer in Art History at the Sorbonne, and the Editor of Grande Galerie, the magazine published by the Louvre Museum. Adrien Goetz was elected to the Académie des Beaux-Arts - Institut de France in December 2018.

== Awards ==
- Prix des Deux Magots in 2004 for his novel La Dormeuse de Naples (The Sleeper of Naples).
- prix du livre d'art du Syndicat National des Antiquaires, for Ingres Collages
- 2007 grand prix François-Victor Noury of the Institut de France, from the Académie Française

== Bibliography ==
=== Novels ===
- Webcam, 2003, Le Passage, 2003, ISBN 978-2-84742-024-1; Points, 2006, ISBN 978-2-7578-0087-4
- La Dormeuse de Naples, Seuil, 2004
- Marie-Antoinette, 2005
- À bas la nuit! B. Grasset, 2006, ISBN 978-2-246-70381-5; LGF/Le Livre de Poche, 2009, ISBN 978-2-253-12341-5
- Intrigue à l'anglaise (Grasset) 2007
- Intrigue à Versailles Grasset, 2009, ISBN 978-2-246-73001-9; Hachette, 2010, ISBN 978-2-253-12984-4
- Le coiffeur de Chateaubriand (Grasset) 2010
- Villa Kérylos (Grasset) 2017, English translation Villa of Delirium (New Vessel Press) 2020 ISBN 978-1-939931-80-1

=== Art criticism ===
- La Grande Galerie des peintures, itinéraires dans les collections (preface Jean-Jacques Aillagon, coédition Centre Pompidou-Louvre-Musée d'Orsay), 2003.
- Au Louvre, Les arts face à face (foreword Henri Loyrette, président directeur du musée du Louvre, coédition Hazan-Musée du Louvre), 2004.
  - Louvre: the arts face to face, Translator David Wharry, Illustrator Erich Lessing, Hazan, 2005, ISBN 978-2-7541-0058-8
- Marie-Antoinette (Éditions Assouline), 2005, ISBN 978-2-84323-753-9.
- Ingres Collages (coédition Le Passage-Musée Ingres de Montauban), 2005.
- L' Atelier de Cézanne, 2006
