= Heir Apparent (novel) =

2002 novel by Vivian Vande Velde

- Author: Vivian Vande Velde
- Cover artist: Cliff Nielsen
- Language: English
- Genre: Children's, science fiction, fantasy novel
- Publisher: Harcourt
- Publication date: 2002
- Publication place: United States
- Media type: Print (Hardback & Paperback)
- ISBN: 0-15-204560-0
- OCLC: 49225237
- LC Class: PZ7.V2773 He 2002

Heir Apparent is a science fiction/fantasy novel by young adult fiction author Vivian Vande Velde, about a girl who becomes trapped inside a looping virtual reality role-playing game called Heir Apparent.

The same girl appeared as a secondary character in User Unfriendly, Vande Velde's earlier book about a game from the same fictional company, Rasmussem, Inc. She later wrote a third book about this company, Deadly Pink. She does not consider the second or third books to be sequels, despite their taking place in the same universe as the first, and she says the three books can be read in any order.

Vande Velde says, "Heir Apparent was a lot of fun to write because it's about a girl caught in a virtual-reality-type game. Even though Giannine finds herself in a vaguely medieval world, I didn't have to worry about historical accuracy. I also was able to keep throwing all sorts of things at her -- a dragon, an army of ghosts, and a poetry-loving/head-chopping statue."

== Plot summary ==
=== Beginning ===
Giannine receives a gift certificate for a Rasmussem Gaming Center as a birthday present from her father. When she arrives at the local center, a crowd from "CPOC," the "Citizens to Protect Our Children," has come for a demonstration against such games. She enters the arcade and gets hooked up to Heir Apparent, a single-player RPG. Giannine's character, Janine de St. Jehan, is the illegitimate child of the recently deceased King Cynric, who pronounced her heir to the throne, passing over three legitimate sons. Her task is to survive the three days (which will only last thirty minutes in the real world) before her coronation. Anytime her character dies, she will be sent back to the beginning of the game.

=== The game ===
Janine finds herself on a sheep farm, where she meets her foster mother and Sir Deming, who delivers the news of her ascendancy to the throne. Ignoring her foster mother's advice to say goodbye to her foster father, Janine heads off to the castle. There she meets Queen Andreanna and her three sons, Abas, Wulfgar, and Kenric. Outside the throne room, the guards bring before Janine a boy caught poaching deer. They expect her to order the boy's execution, but instead she lets the boy go.

Nigel Rasmussem briefly enters the game to inform her that CPOC broke into the arcade and damaged the equipment. She cannot exit the game prematurely without risking brain damage, but she cannot stay in the game for too long without risking death in the real world. She therefore must win the game as quickly as she can. He tells her, "And next time, don't forget the ring." Shortly after he vanishes, the guards assassinate Janine, upset by her lenient ruling.

As she goes through the game again, she is on a constant lookout for the ring. She varies her decisions but keeps getting quickly killed by various characters. Back on the farm, she finally rushes at Sir Deming in frustration and tries to bite his ring off his finger, but he takes out a knife and stabs her. The last thing she hears is her foster mother explaining that the ring she seeks was left with her foster father. In her next life, Janine realizes she must no longer skip the step of saying goodbye to her foster father. She ends up before the statue of Saint Bruce the Warrior Poet, where the ring now resides.

At the castle, barbarian invaders led by King Grimbold kidnap Janine, hoping to ransom back a crown they claim Cynric stole from them. Her own kingdom doesn't value her enough to provide the ransom, and even the ring fails to save her. In her next life, she thwarts the raid, and in the ensuing battle, Abas beheads King Grimbold.

She learns that Cynric gave the stolen crown (which grants the wearer a temporary Midas Touch) to a dragon that terrorized the land many years earlier. The next day, a meeting with magicians is interrupted by an attack by Grimbold's people, who send a message that they won't stop until Janine is dead. Kenric and Orielle poison Janine, once again sending her to the beginning of the game.

She uses her past mistakes to plan her decisions better and gain more allies, no longer experimenting with the ring. The next time she deals with the boy poacher, she gets Kenric to accompany her. Unlike the previous times, she listens to the evidence with an open mind, makes Kenric feel like he's taking part in the decision, and sentences the boy to a month of hard labor rather than killing him or freeing him.

She once again thwarts the raid on the castle, but because the warlike Abas isn't present, King Grimbold isn't killed. She invites Grimbold to the castle, where they all discuss their grievances in a civilized manner. He agrees to cease the attack for two days, while she retrieves the crown from the dragon.

When the magicians arrive the next day, they determine through a scrying glass that the dragon is a week's journey away, but they give her several magical artifacts that help her reach the dragon quickly and survive the confrontation. She retrieves the crown and returns to the castle, but the dragon follows her. As it clutches her in its talons and is about to devour her, she quickly dons the crown and turns the dragon to gold.

She gives the crown to Grimbold, making peace between the two kingdoms and gaining the respect of her compatriots. At Kenric's suggestion, she uses the ring to make Andreanna treat her fairly and not incite the princes against her.

=== Conclusion ===
Giannine awakens in the arms of Nigel Rasmussem, who turns out to be just sixteen - the physical appearance he displayed earlier was actually his uncle's, and he was the physical model for Giannine's in-game crush Kenric. She gets his contact information, and the book ends with Giannine's father coming to take her home.

== Setting ==
The book takes place in Rochester, New York sometime in the twenty-first century future, but the game is set in medieval Europe.

== Major characters ==
- Giannine Bellisario/Princess Janine de St. Jehan—Fourteen-year-old protagonist whose gift certificate from her dad almost costs her her life. The product of a divorced home, she is being raised by her grandmother. She appears in Vande Velde's earlier book User Unfriendly.
- Andreanna—Queen and wife of the late King. She acts very rudely and bitter toward Janine no matter what Janine does.
- Abas—Cynric's middle son, a dim-witted, strength-obsessed titan who initially jumps at any opportunity to kill Janine.
- Kenric—Cynric's youngest son, who shows a strong interest in magic. Nigel Rasmussem warns Janine not to trust him. She finds him physically attractive.
- Wulfgar—Cynric's eldest son, who was "raised abroad" and has a dark secret.
- Xenos—Craftsman of magical artifacts who likes eating centipedes and spiders, especially chocolate-covered ones. He and Orielle do not get along.
- Uldemar—Blind man who can sense the dead and transform his shape. Janine recruits him to transport her to the home of Xenos's father and then race her to the besieged castle.
- Orielle—Beautiful young woman who specializes in brewing potions. Janine uses her potion of strength against the dragon.
- Sir Deming—Snotty nobleman who tells Janine the news of her royal ancestry.
- Counselor Rawdon—Counselor to the late King. He robs the royal treasury.
- Penrod—Captain of the Guards.
- Grimbold—Ruler of the barbarian tribe north of the kingdom. He is enamored by Queen Andreanna but hostile toward her late husband's kingdom because he claims Cynric stole his crown.
- Xenos's father—hermit who physically resembles a child and likes riddles.
- Feordina the Knitter—Tiny, sarcastic woman who dresses in plants and directs Janine to Saint Bruce the Warrior Poet.
- Saint Bruce the Warrior Poet—To retrieve the ring, Janine must go before his statue and recite a poem of her creation; if he doesn't like it or it isn't original, he chops her head off.
- Nigel Rasmussem—Sixteen-year-old founder of Rasmussem, Inc. Ironically, his parents don't let him spend too much time on the computer, so he works at the snack counter of his own company's establishment and awkwardly smells like popcorn.
- Sister Mary Ursula—Weird nondenominational nun obsessed with the "Oneness" of the world. According to Nigel, she does not work well with Kenric, and the most common method of winning the game is to give the ring to her.
- King Cynric—The late ruler had an affair with a servant, resulting in Janine's birth, then sent Janine to be raised on a farm because he feared for her life.

== Magical artifacts ==
- Ring—gives a person control over someone else's actions (can be given by a person only once)
- Crown—gives a person the Midas Touch once; also, it is an important artifact for the northern barbarians
- Boots—gives a person the ability to walk seven leagues in one step, and only seven leagues—no more, no less
- Strength potion—gives a person super-strength for an hour, followed by extreme weakness for two hours
- Hat—allows the user to slip into the time stream for five minutes

== Commentary ==
In her book Constructing Adolescence in Fantastic Realism, Alison Waller discusses Heir Apparent along with several other young-adult novels about virtual reality. She writes that the fact that these novels take place almost entirely within the virtual world suggests "that problems of real life can best be solved within this expressly adolescent space, or that VR environments are inherently more exciting or interesting for teenage readers.... Vande Velde maintains an ironic connection between the fantasy world and a peripheral real world, and this minimises the dramatic tension of events within the virtual reality game: we are always aware that Janine's heroic actions and decision-making find reference points in Giannine's real (and in a way rather ordinary) adolescent concerns.... 'Heir Apparent' acts as a space in between the real social relations Giannine faces at home and the virtual adventure she has to tackle as Janine. In a way, she uses the game space to try out new solutions to adolescent problems: to try out a loving father/daughter relationship, for example."

== Awards and nominations ==
Heir Apparent won the Anne Spencer Lindbergh Prize.
