= Conspiracy Files =

2006 documentary television series

- Country of origin: Worldwide (Discovery Times countries)
- No. of episodes: 4

Production
- Running time: 1 hour

Original release
- Network: Discovery Times
- Release: October 6 – October 27, 2006

Conspiracy Files is a 2006 Discovery Times documentary 4-part television series about conspiracy theories.

== Episodes ==
(in chronological order)

1. JFK Assassination: A bullet's bizarre trajectory. A grassy knoll. A suspect shot to death just two days after a president's assassination. Was it a plot by a national or international agency: the CIA, the FBI, the KGB? Find out who had the most to gain—and to lose. This episode was reported to be based on information in the book Ultimate Sacrifice by Lamar Waldron.
2. Secret History of Jesus: Was the crucifixion of Jesus faked? Did he have children? This conspiracy, suggesting a direct bloodline from the Son of God, has had profound effects through the centuries and has been linked to the most creative thinkers and artists in history.
3. CIA Mind Control: It has all the makings of a government plot, and in this case, it happens to be true. The CIA did perform experiments with LSD as a mind-control agent. But conspiracy theorists insist it was on a much larger scale than officials ever admitted.
4. Roswell: Venture sixty years into the past to examine the body of Roswell evidence. Hear the stories of civilians whose lives were changed by what they saw and of military men who may have been ordered to cover-up what they knew.
