= La Dormeuse de Naples (novel) =

Novel by Adrien Goetz

- Author: Adrien Goetz
- Original title: La Dormeuse de Naples
- Language: French
- Publisher: La Passage
- Publication date: 18 June 2004
- Publication place: France

La Dormeuse de Naples is a novel by French author Adrien Goetz which is not yet translated into English. It takes place in the early 19th century and revolves around an unknown, rumored painting by Jean Auguste Dominique Ingres. It won the Prix des Deux Magots and the Roger Nimier Prize. It was published in 2004 by La Passage publishing house.
