= Rail transport in fiction =

Notable examples of railways in fiction include:

== Films ==
- 3:10 to Yuma (2007), the second adaptation of Elmore Leonard's short story, starring Russell Crowe and Christian Bale.
- The 39 Steps (1935) – Richard Hannay travels on the Flying Scotsman.
- The American Friend (German: Der amerikanische Freund) (1977), adapted from Patricia Highsmith's novel Ripley's Game, features action sequences in the Paris Métro and on a German train.
- Back to the Future Part III – the improvised method of propelling the time machine to 88 mph in 1885 was by using a steam locomotive. Emmett Brown also refitted a steam locomotive into a hovertrain as the basis of his new time machine.
- Brief Encounter (1945) – features romantic meetings in a train station.
- Boxcar Bertha (1972) – starring Barbara Hershey as an orphan who turns to robbing trains for survival. Martin Scorsese's first feature film.
- The Cassandra Crossing (1976) – passengers aboard a transcontinental train face a threat from carrier of plague virus.
- Cairo Station (1958) – takes place in a train station.
- Closely Watched Trains – the story takes places at a railway station in World War II in Czechoslovakia under the Nazi occupation. The film is based on Bohumil Hrabal's novel, directed by Jiří Menzel.
- Creep (2004) – a killer stalks the London Underground.
- Dancer in the Dark (2000) – a hypnotic musical number is staged on a slow-moving freight train.
- The Darjeeling Limited (2007) – a comedy-drama by Wes Anderson that is primarily set aboard a luxury train, the Darjeeling Limited.
- Death Line (1972) – features a killer on the London Underground.
- Dil Se.. (1998) – features a fantasy musical number, Chaiyya Chaiyya, staged on a moving Nilgiri Mountain Railway train.
- Double Indemnity (1944) – a murderer stages a fake accident on a train.
- Emperor of the North Pole (1973) – a Great Depression-era film about hobos starring Lee Marvin and Ernest Borgnine.
- The First Great Train Robbery – based on the Great Gold Robbery of 1855.
- From Russia with Love – James Bond novel and film, confrontation onboard the Orient Express.
- The Burning Train (1980) – the plot revolves around a train named Super Express that catches fire on its inaugural run from New Delhi to Mumbai.
- The General (1926) – A Buster Keaton film about a train engineer during the Civil War, featuring a train crash which cost $42,000, holding the record for the most expensive shot in silent film history.
- Give My Regards to Broad Street – a day in the life of Paul McCartney. Master tapes to McCartney's new album are stolen. Featuring London Broad Street station.
- The Great St Trinian's Train Robbery (1969) – a group of train robbers are chased up and down a local railway line by a group of unruly students from a local school.
- The Great Train Robbery – an influential 1903 silent film based on a true story, also the title of a modern film.
- Horror Express – Anglo-Spanish horror film set aboard the Trans-Siberian Express, on which passengers are killed off one by one.
- The Hunter (1980) – Steve McQueen chases a fugitive onto an elevated train.
- The Lady Vanishes by Alfred Hitchcock – the majority of the plot takes place on a train heading for England.
- Men in Black and Men in Black II – starring Will Smith and Tommy Lee Jones, has aliens living in the subway.
- Mission: Impossible – sees a helicopter pursuing a TGV train into the Channel Tunnel which runs between Great Britain and France. In reality this type of train does not travel through the Channel Tunnel, and the tunnel shown in the film has double track whereas the real tunnel has two single bores.
- Miss Potter – sequences for the film Miss Potter starring Ewan McGregor and Renée Zellweger were filmed at Horsted Keynes station on the Bluebell Railway.
- Murder on the Orient Express (1974) – based on the novel by Agatha Christie, starring Albert Finney, Lauren Bacall, Ingrid Bergman.
- Murder, She Said – features extensive railway scenes. Based on the novel 4:50 from Paddington by Agatha Christie.
- The Narrow Margin (1952) – a deadly game of cat-and-mouse aboard a train. Remade under the same title in 1990.
- Night Mail (1936) – a documentary film about a mail train's trip from London to Scotland.
- Night Train (1959) – Polish film by Jerzy Kawalerowicz.
- North by Northwest (1959) – Alfred Hitchcock thriller starring Cary Grant, Eva Marie Saint and James Mason.
- North West Frontier (1959) – a British army officer transports a young prince to safety aboard an antiquated locomotive.
- Oh, Mr Porter! (1937) – Will Hay film about an incompetent station master in charge of a near-derelict railway station in Northern Ireland.
- The Olsen Gang on the Track (1975) – a Danish comedy film directed by Erik Balling and starring Ove Sprogøe.
- Once Upon a Time in the West (1968) – a Spaghetti Western directed by Sergio Leone that deals with a railroad tycoon trying force a widow off her land to make way for his railroad.
- The Polar Express – a Christmas story about a non-believing young boy and his adventures with Santa Claus.
- Robbery (1967) – based loosely on the Great Train Robbery.
- Runaway (2009) – National Film Board of Canada animated comedy short about a runaway train.
- Runaway Train – escaped convicts on a runaway train.
- Silver Streak - a passenger train is both the primary set and plays a pivotal part in bringing murderers to justice.
- Speed (1994) – known mostly for its sequences on a city bus, this film's climax is set on the Los Angeles subway.
- The Station Agent (2003) – a man who seeks solitude in an abandoned train station in Newfoundland, New Jersey.
- Strangers on a Train (1951) – Alfred Hitchcock classic thriller.
- Snowpiercer (2013) – a science fiction post-apocalyptic film directed by Bong Joon Ho about a luxury train that circles around the Earth.
- Steamboy (2004) – featured extensive railway scenes (including a chase scene between a Midland Railway train, a "steam automotive" and a steam-powered monowheel) around London and Manchester.
- Terror by Night (1946) – a Sherlock Holmes film, with the story revolving around the theft of a famous diamond aboard a train.
- Terror Train (1980) – Canadian horror film starring Jamie Lee Curtis.
- The Taking of Pelham One Two Three – 1974 film adapted from the John Godey novel of the same name about the hijacking of a New York subway train.
- The Taking of Pelham 123 – 2009 remake of the 1974 version of the hijacking of the New York subway train.
- The Titfield Thunderbolt (1953) – set on a country railway threatened with closure and sabotage by a local bus service.
- Tourist Train (1933) – comic adventures of travellers on Italian railways.
- The Train (1964) – French Resistance members try to stop a Nazi colonel from transporting priceless works of art aboard a train to Germany.
- Train of Events (1949) – revolves around the lives of several people involved in a train crash.
- Under Siege 2: Dark Territory (1995) – sequel of the 1992 film Under Siege about mercenaries who hijacked a passenger train in the Rocky Mountains and ex-Navy SEAL Casey Ryback who tries to stop them.
- Unstoppable (2010) – tells the story of a runaway freight train and two men who try to stop it. Inspired by the CSX 8888 incident.
- Volcano – an extension to the subway meets a lava flow.
- Von Ryan's Express – World War II prisoners of war escape by hijacking their train.
- The Warriors (1979) – many scenes set in and around the New York City Subway.
- While You Were Sleeping – stars Sandra Bullock as a subway worker who is mistaken for the fiancée of an injured passenger.
- Zootopia – an express train and freight train are used by the protagonist, and an abandoned subway car is one of the sites of the climax.

== Television ==
- Atomic Train – television film (1999) – a runaway train carries an atomic bomb into a town.
- Chuggington – a British children's animated television series produced by Ludorum plc.
- Dad's Army – several episodes were set at Walmington-on-Sea railway station or on the local railway line.
- Digimon Frontier – features several train-like Digimon called Trailmon that run on monorails.
- Digimon Tamers: The Runaway Digimon Express – features a train-like Digimon called Locomon that is controlled by another Digimon causing it to run wild on the railways. It later evolves into a meaner-looking Digimon called Grandlocomon.
- The Flockton Flyer – about a family who work on a heritage railway.
- Oh, Doctor Beeching! – set on a railway station threatened with closure.
- Petticoat Junction – set on a rural railway line permanently threatened with closure.
- Two seasons of Power Rangers, Lightspeed Rescue and Mystic Force, feature train-based Megazords, the Supertrain Megazord and Solar Streak Megazord respectively. They are based on Grand Liner of Kyuukyuu Sentai GoGoFive and Travelion of Mahou Sentai Magiranger respectively.
- Quatermass and the Pit – building work on the London Underground unearths artefacts from a race of extraterrestrials.
- Snowpiercer (2020) – A science fiction post-apocalyptic series about a luxury train that circles around the Earth.
- Supertrain – a television series on a huge luxury double-decker high-speed train.
- Thomas the Tank Engine and Friends – TV series originated from The Railway Series by the Rev. W. Awdry
- Kabaneri of the Iron Fortress – anime series featuring a locomotive that runs on steam, transporting villagers escaping from Kabane.
- Kamen Rider Den-O – features the DenLiner, a train able to travel through time.
- Ressha Sentai ToQger – Super Sentai series featuring trains.
- Infinity Train – the primary setting is the titular locomotive, a train with seemingly infinite cars containing fantasy environments in another universe.

== Literature ==
- 4:50 from Paddington (book; film and TV adaptations) – a Miss Marple story. A passenger on one train is witness to a murder being committed on another train.
- The Adventure of the Lost Locomotive – a Solar Pons story about a disappearing train on the Great Northern Railway.
- Anna Karenina (book) – by Leo Tolstoy. Train travel is arguably the most prominent motif of the story.
- Atlas Shrugged by Ayn Rand – features the train the Taggart Comet.
- The Boundless – a novel by Kenneth Oppel set in a train called the Boundless.
- "The Celestial Railroad" – short story by Nathaniel Hawthorne.
- Choo Choo: The Story of a Little Engine Who Ran Away (book, episode adaptation in Shelley Duvall's Bedtime Stories) – a children's book by Virginia Lee Burton. The adventures of a beautiful little locomotive who decided to run away from her humdrum duties.
- Commonwealth Saga – a novel series featuring huge, nuclear-powered trains for interstellar travel (through artificial wormholes).
- The Dark Tower (book series) by Stephen King – the main character Roland of Gilead travels through a series of caves which were once part of an underground railroad system. The characters also ride on a monorail with artificial intelligence.
- The Devil's Horse, The Poison Tree and The Abyss in Cynthia Harrod-Eagles' The Morland Dynasty series feature the development of steam power and the first railways in Britain.
- Dreadnought – the third novel in Cherie Priest's Clockwork Century series, where the main character rides on a Union war locomotive called the Dreadnought. It is used by the Union to terrorize Confederate rail traffic. It is a warship on rails, with a heavily armored engine, plenty of automated guns, and a complement of troops on board.
- The Engine Woman’s Light by Laurel Anne Hill – a spirits-meet-steampunk novel about the heroic journey of a young Latina in an alternate 19th-century California, where trains are used to transport undesirables to a dreaded asylum.
- Freedom Express – the seventh novel in the Wingman series by Mack Maloney features a ten-mile-long super-train that is heavily armored, heavily armed and carries members of the heroic Post-Apocalyptic Badass Army that protects what remains of America.
- Galaxy Express 999 – from the manga and anime of the same name by Leiji Matsumoto; this train travels the galaxy from planet to planet.
- Iron Council (book) by China Miéville – a fantasy novel about the building of a cross-continental railway line.
- Jim Stringer: Steam Detective – series of mystery novels by Andrew Martin set on various British railway lines.
- La Bête humaine – (novel) by Émile Zola, filmed five times, e.g. as Cruel Train
- Greatwinter Trilogy – book series featuring trains powered by wind turbines and trains powered by pedaling done by passengers. Passengers are ranked according to how much they pedal, and those who pedal most get credits towards their fare and priority use of the railside facilities.
- Grim Tuesday – the second book in The Keys to the Kingdom series features a train with spikes on it.
- The Half-Made World – novel featuring The 38 Engines of the Line which are sentient trains. Nobody knows their exact origin.
- Inverted World – a novel about a large city run on rails.
- The Little Engine That Could – children's book. Also adapted as an animated film in 1991 (see The Little Engine That Could (film)).
- The Locomotive – dynamic poem for children by Julian Tuwim, filmed by Zbigniew Rybczyński.
- The Lost Special – short story by Arthur Conan Doyle about the investigation of a special train mysteriously disappearing.
- Making Tracks (23 Classic Railroad Stories) (2013), ed. by Jon Schlenker and Charles G. Waugh.
- The Moosepath Saga by Van Reid – all six books in this series feature travel by rail, entailing adventure, comedy, mystery, and romance in late 19th-century Maine.
- Moscow-Petushki by Venedikt Yerofeyev – a postmodernist prose poem by Russian writer and satirist Venedikt Yerofeyev.
- The Motion Demon – 1919 (book) horror stories by Stefan Grabiński: "Engine Driver Grot", "The Wandering Train", "The Motion Demon", "The Sloven", "The Perpetual Passenger", "In the Compartment", "Signals", "The Siding", "Ultima Thule".
- Murder on the Orient Express (book by Agatha Christie, 1934; film) – describes a train journey from Istanbul to Paris aboard the Orient Express during which a murder takes place. Hercule Poirot, riding on the train, solves the mystery and justice is served.
- The Mystery of the Blue Train (book, TV adaptation) – earlier Poirot story in which a murder takes place on a train.
- The Network (book) – by Laurence Staig. An ancient prophecy is realised one Christmas Eve in the London Underground, a dramatic race against time as three people are thrown together to prevent a terrifying catastrophe.
- Night on the Galactic Railroad (novel, film) – two boys travel on a magical train across the night sky – but there is a deeper meaning to the journey.
- Nightside (book series) – a book series featuring subway trains that don't require drivers; they travel through other dimensions as shortcuts and heal themselves when damaged.
- Quadrail series – a novel series featuring an interplanetary metro system, with light-years-long tunnels that snake around the galaxy and connect many interplanetary systems together.
- Railsea (book) by China Miéville – a fantasy novel that features railway tracks that represent oceans and sea called Railsea and features giant moles ("moldywarpes") that represent whales and boat-like trains. It parodies Herman Melville's Moby-Dick.
- The Railway Series – British stories about a fictional railway by Rev. W. Awdry, which would later be adapted into the children's show Thomas and Friends.
- Raising Steam – the 40th Discworld novel features the first steam locomotive on Discworld called Iron Girder.
- Red Mars – the first book in the Mars Trilogy features a train that goes around the circumference of the moon and travels fast enough to generate rotational gravity, relieving the difficulties of living in microgravity and allowing colonists to acclimate before moving down to the Martian surface colonies.
- Silver on the Tree, the last book in Susan Cooper's The Dark is Rising cycle – approaching the climax of the story, the main characters travel on a mystical train to the final battle between the Light and the Dark.
- Starcross (novel) – the second novel in the Larklight series features a space railway in the Asteroid Belt made by the same company that built the Crystal Palace.
- Strangers on a Train (novel, film) – tells the story of how two strangers meet on a train and decide to exchange murders so they can't be tied to each other.
- The Thirty-Nine Steps – (book by John Buchan, films, one by Alfred Hitchcock) features a sequence where the character Richard Hannay escapes from the police by jumping from a train on the Forth Bridge in Scotland.
- The Trackman (book) – by Karl Davis – a police procedural crime novel set in Hull, London, Newcastle and the home counties. The main character (Det. Sgt Joe Tenby) hunts a deranged serial killer who is targeting people connected to the railway network.
- Via Bodenbach, an experimental novel about a train journey to Berlin by Hungarian novelist Ferenc Körmendi, published in 1932 and widely translated.
- Wheelworld – the second novel in the To the Stars (trilogy) set in an agricultural colony on a planet with very extreme seasons, causing the entire colony to escape the brutal summers twice per year by turning into a mobile colony. This is accomplished by jacking up the colony's main buildings on wheels, forming them up behind the colony's nuclear power plants (which are now transformed into an enormous locomotive) into a train-like vehicle that run on roads rather than tracks. This makes the 12,000 mile trek to the other side of the planet.
- The Wind in the Willows – an episode in the novel involves the flight of Mr. Toad by rail and a chase scene with another train full of policemen.
- The Yellow Arrow – an allegorical story by Victor Pelevin written in 1993.

== Comics and graphic novels ==
- Assassin's Creed: The Fall – a comic book mini-series featuring Alexander III's Imperial Train.
- Batman – the character had a subterranean jet-propelled train car called the Batsubway Rocket.
- The League of Extraordinary Gentleman, Volume II – a comic book featuring a secret black government train. Its engine number is .007.
- Paranatural – a webcomic featuring a living spirit that represents a flying ghost train called Ghost Train.
- Stand Still, Stay Silent – A Finnish-Swedish webcomic featuring an armored railcar called Dalahästen that destroys anything that gets on the tracks. It also has a giant buzzsaws mounted on the top.
- Le Transperceneige – a French graphic novel about a luxury train in a post-apocalyptic ice age later inspired the 2013 film Snowpiercer.

== Plays and musicals ==
- The Crazy Locomotive by Stanisław Ignacy Witkiewicz – 1923 expressionistic 45-minute play (Obie Award-winning production at the Chelsea Theatre Center in 1977, Classical Theatre of Harlem). Two engineers push the locomotive to ever-greater speeds, causing a head-on collision.
- Dutchman – play by LeRoi Jones (Amiri Baraka) set in the New York City Subway.
- The Ghost Train – play by Arnold Ridley about a group of passengers stranded in a haunted railway station. Adapted to film numerous times.
- Starlight Express (Andrew Lloyd Webber) – musical about trains competing in a World Championship railway race.
- The Wrecker – play by Arnold Ridley about a steam engine that is allegedly possessed. It was later made into the 1929 film The Wrecker; however, it did not feature the possessed train.

== Games ==
- Alice Madness Returns – the Infernal Train appears as the main source of destruction in Wonderland, controlled by the Dollmaker. It can be seen throughout numerous parts in the game, and it is used as a final chapter.
- Grand Theft Auto – most of this series of games contains a form of railroad (train, tram, etc.).
- Half-Life (series) – several of the games start or end on trams and trains, and feature themes of rail transportation in-game as usable trams or as obstacles and scenery.
- Mario Kart 8 – one race takes place in a subway station called Golden Bell. With the Booster Course Pass released for Mario Kart 8 Deluxe, the track Kalimari Desert (which was previously featured in Mario Kart 64) was added, which features a steam locomotive styled after early American steam locomotives.
- The Legend of Zelda: Spirit Tracks – features the controllable Spirit Train and the Demon Train as an antagonist.

== Other ==
- Astrotrain – a Decepticon triple-changer from the Transformers toy line, who transforms into a steam locomotive and a shuttle.
- Coors Light – one of its advertisements features a refrigerated train filled with chilled Coors Light beer. Every time it passes, its surroundings are covered in frost.
- "Rock Island Line" – American folk song.
- "Tons of Steel" – a Grateful Dead song about a man and the train he operates.

== See also ==
- Hovertrains in fiction
