= Lord Sunday =

Novel by Garth Nix

- The Australian cover for Lord Sunday.
- Author: Garth Nix
- Language: English
- Series: The Keys to the Kingdom
- Genre: Young adult novel
- Publisher: Allen & Unwin (Aus)
- Publication date: 1 February 2010 (Aus); 16 March 2010 (US); 4 March (UK)
- Publication place: Australia
- Media type: Print (Paperback)
- Pages: 336
- ISBN: 978-1-74114-591-5
- Preceded by: Superior Saturday

Lord Sunday is the seventh book concluding Garth Nix's The Keys to the Kingdom series. It tells the last part of the adventures of a boy named Arthur in his quest to take back a magical world.

The book was released in Australia on 1 February 2010, the U.K. on 4 March 2010, and the U.S. on 16 March 2010.

== Plot ==
=== Background ===
Arthur Penhaligon is a young boy who has gotten involved with the 'House', a magical world. This world comprises seven parts, each containing a 'Key' (powerful magical objects) and a part of the 'Will' (a being that holds the wish of the absent 'Architect'), under control of a villainous 'Trustee'. Arthur is on a quest to defeat the 'Trustees' and fulfill the 'Will'.

At the end of the preceding book, Trustee Saturday was invading the 'Incomparable Gardens', the domain of the seventh and last Trustee Sunday. Arthur was thrown off the edge of the Gardens, and meanwhile back on Earth a nuclear strike was occurring on his hometown.

=== This book ===
In his fall, Arthur uses the 'Improbable Stair', a magical way of transport, but because he was falling, he ends up in a random place in the universe where he gets attacked by insect-like creatures. Meanwhile, his imprisoned ally Suzy convinces her forgetful guard Giac to let her free and accompany her to the Incomparable Gardens.

On Earth, while Arthur's friend Leaf is dealing with the aftermath of a nuclear strike, a powerful servant of Sunday's forces her to come with him to the House. Sunday intends to use her and Arthur's mother as hostages. When they arrive, the 'Front Door', a room that acts as the entrance of the House, is being overwhelmed by creatures called 'Nithlings', who kill the 'Lieutenant Keeper of the Door', causing the role of Lieutenant Keeper to fall on Leaf, who then cannot be forced to leave the 'Front Door', so the servant goes back to Sunday to report his failure.

With extreme effort, Arthur manages to get out of his precarious position using the 'Improbable Stair'. He thinks he's arrived in his bedroom on Earth and he finds his mother in the house, but she cannot see him and he has no way to interact with her. Then a boy comes in, whom Arthur forces to take him out of this copy of his house. The boy then reveals himself to be Sunday in disguise and Arthur is imprisoned. However, he manages to make a toy elephant come to life, which he sends to retrieve his confiscated Keys. When they finally arrive, he is able to free himself. He battles with Sunday, who is also facing the combined forces of Saturday and the 'Piper', an independent powerful House creature. The battle moves to the location of the last part of the Will, which is in the form of an apple tree locked in a golden cage. Arthur's ally the Mariner opens the cage at the cost of his life, and the freed Will fragment traps Sunday while Arthur claims the seventh Key.

When the last part of the Will joins the rest, the House is destroyed and the incarcerated divine being the 'Old One' breaks free and becomes one with the Will. It is explained that the divine being, the 'Architect', was bored of living forever, but could not die without destroying all of creation, because she had chained the fate of the 'Old One' to that of the House, and the Old One was in fact a part of the Architect. Therefore, she had turned herself into the Will so that an heir, to be made the new Architect, would be found. The Architect destroys the remnants of creation, and Arthur becomes the new Architect as the old Architect fades away. Arthur decides to recreate the universe as it was, but cannot recreate his mother. He splits himself into the human Arthur and the new Architect, who sends the human Arthur and Leaf back to Earth. The new Architect remakes Suzy and gives her the title of the new lady Sunday; they decide to also remake a number of her friends and design the new House with them.

== Reception ==
Reviewing the novel in Australian Book Review Benjamin Chandler noted that the narrative has "a frenetic energy that mirrors the plot." In "focusing on action, Nix has allowed some of the subtlety of his world-building to fall by the wayside", however "Nix manages to throw in a few genuine surprises that will doubtless delight his fans."
