= Garth Nix =

Australian fantasy writer (born 1963)

Garth Nix OAM
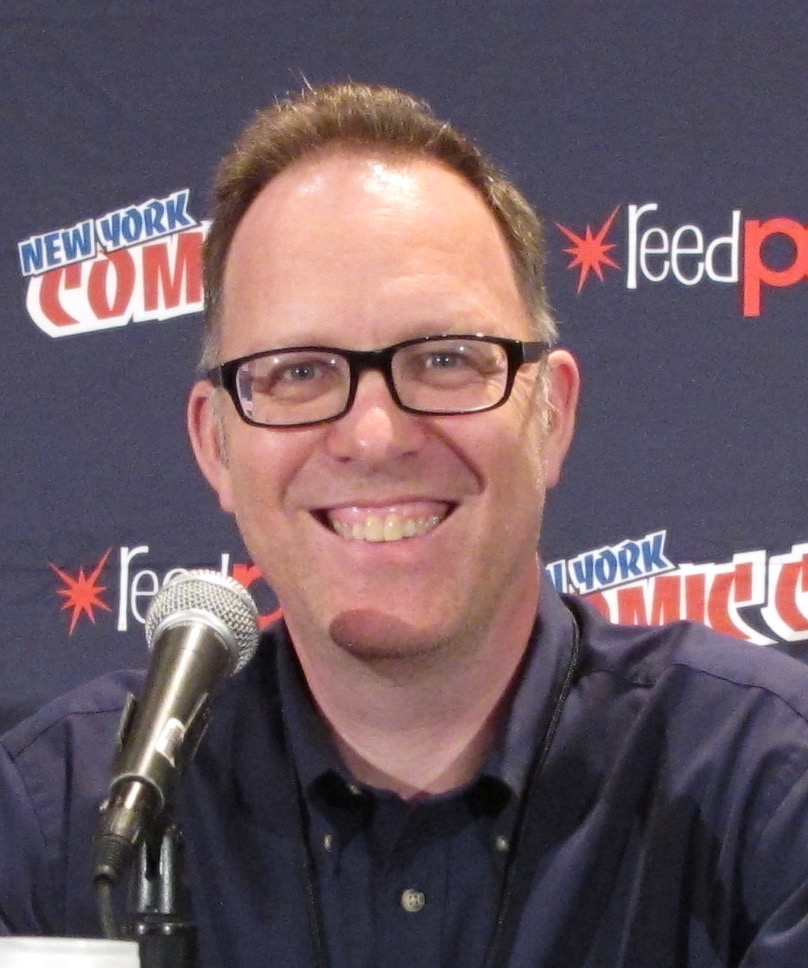
- Nix at the 2014 Comic Con
- Born: Garth Richard Nix; 19 July 1963 (age 63); Melbourne, Victoria, Australia
- Occupation: Writer
- Writing career
- Years active: 1990–present
- Genre: Fantasy
- Website: garthnix.com

Garth Richard Nix (born 19 July 1963) is an Australian writer who specialises in children's and young adult fantasy novels, notably the Old Kingdom, Seventh Tower and Keys to the Kingdom series. He has frequently been asked if his name is a pseudonym, to which he has responded, "I guess people ask me because it sounds like the perfect name for a writer of fantasy. However, it is my real name."

== Biography ==
Born in Melbourne, Nix was raised in Canberra. He attended Turner Primary School, Lyneham High School and Dickson College for schooling. While at Dickson College, Nix joined the Australian Army Reserve. After a period working for the Australian government, he traveled in Europe before returning to Australia in 1983 and undertaking a BA in professional writing at University of Canberra.

He worked in a Canberra bookshop after graduation, before moving to Sydney in 1987, where he worked his way up in the publishing field. He was a sales rep and publicist before becoming a senior editor at HarperCollins. In 1993 he commenced further travel in Asia, the Middle East and Eastern Europe before becoming a marketing consultant, founding his own company, Gotley Nix Evans Pty Ltd. From 1999 to 2002 he worked as a literary agent with Curtis Brown (Australia) Pty Ltd before becoming a full-time author.

In addition to his work as a fantasy novelist, Nix has written a number of scenarios and articles for the role playing field, including those for Dungeons & Dragons and Traveller. These have appeared in related publications such as White Dwarf, Multiverse and Breakout!. He has also written case studies, articles and news items in the information technology field, his work appearing in publications such as Computerworld and PC World.

Nix was awarded the Medal of the Order of Australia in the 2025 King's Birthday Honours.

Nix currently lives in Sydney with his wife Anna McFarlane, a publisher, and their sons Thomas and Edward.

== Bibliography ==
=== Picture books ===
==== Very Clever Baby ====
This series was self-published, and republished by Text Publishing. Described as books for "Very Clever Babies Aged 3–6 Months", they contain such words as ichthyologist, as used by the character Freddy the Fish.

- Very Clever Baby's First Reader (1988)
- Very Clever Baby's Ben Hur (1988)
- Very Clever Baby's Guide to the Greenhouse Effect (1992)
- Very Clever Baby's First Christmas (1998)

=== Young adult and children's literature ===
==== The Old Kingdom ====
===== Novels =====
- Sabriel (1995)
- Lirael (2001)
- Abhorsen (2003)
- Clariel (2014)
- Goldenhand (2016)
- Terciel and Elinor (2021)

===== Short fiction =====
- "Nicholas Sayre and the Creature in the Case" (2005). A novella produced for World Book Day and originally entitled "The Creature in the Case". Reprinted under the new title in the collection Across the Wall: A Tale of the Abhorsen and Other Stories.)
- "The Nine Gates of Death: An Extract of the Journal of Idrach the Lesser Necromancer" (2009). A short story released on oldkingdom.com.au
- "An Essay on Free Magic". Short text released on the Old Kingdom website.
- "To Hold the Bridge". A novella original published in the Legends of Australian Fantasy anthology edited by Jack Dann and Jonathan Strahan. Reprinted in the collection To Hold the Bridge.
- "Doctor Crake Crosses the Wall". Short story included in the Australian edition of Goldenhand, also published on the official Australian Old Kingdom website.

===== Omnibus =====
- The Old Kingdom Chronicles (The Abhorsen Chronicles in the United States) (2009). This contained the first three Abhorsen books and "The Creature in the Case".

==== The Seventh Tower ====
1. The Fall (2000)
2. Castle (2000)
3. Aenir (2001)
4. Above the Veil (2001)
5. Into Battle (2001)
6. The Violet Keystone (2001)

==== The Keys to the Kingdom ====
1. Mister Monday (2003)
2. Grim Tuesday (2004)
3. Drowned Wednesday (2005)
4. Sir Thursday (2006)
5. Lady Friday (2007)
6. Superior Saturday (2008)
7. Lord Sunday (2010)

==== The Left-Handed Booksellers of London ====
1. The Left-Handed Booksellers of London (2020)
2. The Sinister Booksellers of Bath (2023)
3. The Even-Handed Booksellers of Edinburgh (forthcoming)

==== Troubletwisters (co-written with Sean Williams) ====
1. Troubletwisters (2011)
2. The Monster (2012)
3. The Mystery (2013)
4. The Missing (2014)

==== Have Sword, Will Travel (co-written with Sean Williams) ====
1. Have Sword, Will Travel (2017)
2. Let Sleeping Dragons Lie (2018)

==== Works in multi-author series ====
- Spirit Animals Book 3: Blood Ties (2014, with Sean Williams)
- Serena and the Sea Serpent (2000), part of Aussie Bites series

==== Collection ====
- 2007 One Beastly Beast: Two Aliens, Three Inventors, Four Fantastic Tales - a book of short stories for younger readers
  - "Serena and the Sea Serpent"
  - "Bill the Inventor"
  - "Blackbread the Pirate"

==== Standalone novels ====
- The Ragwitch (1990), a children's fantasy novel
- Shade's Children (1997), a young adult post-apocalyptic sci-fi novel
- A Confusion of Princes (2012), a young adult space opera novel
- Newt's Emerald (2015), a fantasy romance
- Frogkisser! (2017), a children's fantasy novel
- Angel Mage (2019), a young adult fantasy sci-fi novel
- We Do Not Welcome Our Ten-Year-Old Overlord (2024)

=== Works for adults ===
==== Sir Hereward and Mister Fitz ====
1. 2007 "Sir Hereward and Mister Fitz Go to War Again", in Jim Baen's Universe
2. 2008 "Beyond the Sea Gate of the Scholar-Pirates of Sarsköe", in Fast Ships, Black Sails edited by Jeff VanderMeer and Ann VanderMeer
3. 2010 "A Suitable Present for a Sorcerous Puppet", in Swords and Dark Magic, edited by Lou Anders and Jonathan Strahan
4. 2013 "Losing Her Divinity", in Rags & Bones: New Twists on Timeless Tales, edited by Melissa Marr and Tim Pratt
5. 2014 "A Cargo of Ivories", in Rogues, edited by George R. R. Martin and Gardner Dozois
6. 2014 "Home is the Haunter", in Fearsome Magics, edited by Jonathan Strahan
7. 2017 "A Long, Cold Trail", in The Book of Swords, edited by Gardner Dozois
8. 2020 "Cut Me Another Quill, Mister Fitz", in The Book of Dragons, edited by Jonathan Strahan
9. 2023 "The Field of Fallen Foe", in the collection Sir Hereward and Mister Fitz: Stories of the Witch Knight and the Puppet Sorcerer (2023)
- The first three stories are collected in Sir Hereward and Mister Fitz: Three Adventures (2011).
- All nine stories are collected in Sir Hereward and Mister Fitz: Stories of the Witch Knight and the Puppet Sorcerer (2023).

==== Collections ====
  - "The Princess and the Beastly Beast"
- 2005 Across the Wall: A Tale of the Abhorsen and Other Stories
  - 2005 "Nicholas Sayre and the Creature in the Case" (published for World Book Day)
  - 2001 "Under the Lake" (from The Magazine of Fantasy & Science Fiction)
  - 2005 "Charlie Rabbit" (from Kids' Night In collected for War Child)
  - 1996 "From the Lighthouse" (from Fantastic Worlds anthology edited by Paul Collins)
  - 2001 "The Hill" (from X-Changes: Stories for a New Century)
  - 2001 "Lightning Bringer" (from Love & Sex anthology edited by Michael Cart)
  - 1987 "Down to the Scum Quarter" (fromMyths and Legends, reprinted inBreakout! magazine in 1988)
  - 2002 "Heart's Desire" (from The Magazine of Fantasy & Science Fiction)
  - 2000 "Hansel's Eyes" (from A Wolf at the Door anthology edited by Ellen Datlow and Terri Windling)
  - 2003 "Hope Chest" (from Firebirds anthology edited by Sharyn November)
  - 1999 "My New Really Epic Fantasy Series" (from Swancon Program Book)
  - 2000 "Three Roses" (from Eidolon magazine, Autumn 2000)
  - 2004 "Endings" (from Gothic! Ten Original Dark Tales anthology edited by Deborah Noyes)
- 2015 To Hold the Bridge
  - 2010 "To Hold the Bridge: An Old Kingdom Story" (fromLegends of Australian Fantasy anthology, edited by Jack Dann and Jonathan Strahan)
  - 2011 "Vampire Weather" (from Teeth anthology, edited by Ellen Datlow and Terri Windling)
  - 2008 "Strange Fishing in the Western Highlands" (from Hellboy: Oddest Jobs, edited by Christopher Golden_
  - 2008 "Old Friends" (from Dreaming Again anthology, edited by Jack Dann)
  - 2011 "The Quiet Knight" (from Geektastic anthology edited by Holly Black and Cecil Castellucci)
  - 2012 "You Won't Feel a Thing" (from After anthology edited by Ellen Datlow and Terri Windling)
  - 2012 "A Handful of Ashes" (from Under My Hat anthology, edited by Jonathan Strahan)
  - 2012 "The Big Question" (from Elsewhere, Edinburgh Festival Special)
  - 2009 "Stop!" (from The Dragon Book anthology edited by Jack Dann and Gardner Dozois)
  - 2008 "Infestation" (from The Starry Rift anthology edited by Jonathan Strahan)
  - 2011 "The Heart of the City" (from Subterranean Online magazine)
  - "Ambrose and the Ancient Spirits of East and West" (from The Thackery T. Lambshead Cabinet of Curiosities anthology edited by Ann VanderMeer and Jeff VanderMeer)
  - 2007 "Holly and Iron" (from Wizards anthology, edited by Jack Dann and Gardner Dozois)
  - 2011 "The Curious Case of the Moondawn Daffodils Murder: As Experienced by Sir Magnus Holmes and Almost-Doctor Susan Shrike" (from Ghosts by Gaslight anthology edited by Jack Dann and Nick Gevers)
  - 2009 "An Unwelcome Guest" (from Troll's-Eye View anthology edited by Ellen Datlow and Terri Windling)
  - 2010 "The Highest Justice" (from Zombies vs. Unicorns anthology edited by Holly Black and Justine Larbalestier)
  - 2012 "Master Haddad's Holiday" (a bonus story from the Australian printing of A Confusion of Princes)
  - 2012 "Sidekick of Mars" (originally from the Under the Moons of Mars anthology edited by John Joseph Adams)
  - 2011 "Peace in Our Time" (originally from the Steampunk! anthology edited by Kelly Link and Gavin J. Grant)
- 2011 Sir Hereward and Mister Fitz: Three Adventures
  - 2007 "Sir Hereward and Mister Fitz Go To War Again" (from Jim Baen's Universe)
  - 2008 "Beyond the Sea Gate of the Scholar-Pirates of Sarsköe" (from Fast Ships, Black Sails anthology edited by Jeff and Ann VanderMeer)
  - 2010 "'A Suitable Present for a Sorcerous Puppet'" (from Swords and Dark Magic anthology edited by Lou Anders and Jonathan Strahan)

==== Uncollected stories ====
- 1984 "Sam, Cars and the Cuckoo" in Warlock magazine no. 2
- 1996 "The Kind Old Sun Will Know" first published in Eidolon magazine
- 2005 "Read It in the Headlines!" in Daikaiju! Giant Monster Tales, edited by Robert Hood and Robin Pen
- 2006 "Dog Soldier" first published in Jim Baen's Universe, 2006
- 2007 "Bad Luck, Trouble, Death and Vampire Sex" first published in Eclipse, edited by Jonathan Strahan
- 2009 "The Nine Gates of Death: An Extract of the Journal of Idrach the Lesser Necromancer" – first published on oldkingdom.com.au
- 2010 "The Highest Justice" in Zombies vs. Unicorns, edited by Justine Larbalestier and Holly Black
- 2013 "Crossing the Line" first published in Fearie Tales, edited by Stephen Jones
- 2013 "Fire Above, Fire Below" first published by Tor.com
- 2014 "Shay Corsham Worsted" first published in Fearful Symmetries, edited by Ellen Datlow
- 2014 "Happy Go Lucky" first published in Kaleidoscope, edited by Alisa Krasnostein and Julia Rios
- 2015 "By Frogsled and Lizardback to Outcast Venusian Lepers" in Old Venus, edited by George R. R. Martin and Gardner Dozois
- 2019 "Dislocation Space" first published by Tor.com
- 2020 "The Case of the Somewhat Mythic Sword" first published by Tor.com
- 2020 "The Necessary Arthur" first published by Tor.com

==== Novels ====
- The Calusari (1997), an adaptation of The X-Files episode of the same name
- The Massif (2026), a work of military science fiction
