= The Fall (Nix novel) =

2000 book by Garth Nix

- The Fall book cover
- Author: Garth Nix
- Illustrator: Steve Rawlings
- Cover artist: Madalina Stefan
- Language: English
- Series: The Seventh Tower
- Genre: Fantasy novel
- Publisher: Scholastic
- Publication date: 17 June 2000
- Publication place: Australian
- Media type: Print (paperback)
- Pages: 195 (US)
- ISBN: 0-439-17682-4
- OCLC: 44189031
- LC Class: CPB Box no. 1858 vol. 13
- Followed by: Castle

The Fall is the first book in Garth Nix's The Seventh Tower series, published in 2000 by Scholastic in partnership with Lucasfilm under the imprint LucasBooks. It tells the story of Tal, a boy who lives in a world with eternal darkness, whose attempt to steal a Sunstone causes him to fall into the unknown world outside of the mysterious castle he grew up in.

== Background ==
After the success of Nix's Sabriel, a Scholastic editor emailed Nix to say that he'd love to work with Nix on something and a few months later, the editor informed Nix that Scholastic was partnering with LucasFilm to create a new fantasy series and asked Nix if he would be interested in writing it. Scholastic and Lucasfilm gave Nix a general list of "influences and ideas" to base the series on and he was then given creative freedom to expand upon it. "I've enjoyed as much creative freedom as I've had with any other book, coupled with lots of valuable editorial input," Nix said in an interview.

== Plot ==
Thirteen-year-old Tal has lived his entire life in the enormous, labyrinthine Castle of the Chosen, which is in a state of perpetual darkness due to the Veil that hangs above its seven towers. Inside the Castle, society is organised into stratified society organised by the colors of the rainbow and light.

Tal is preparing for his Day of Ascension, in which he will enter the spirit world of Aenir to bind a Spiritshadow and cement his place in the castle, when he receives news that his father, who had left the castle on a secret mission, has been declared missing and is presumed dead, which threatens Tal's plans for the Day of Ascension.

Tal's father possessed the family's Primary Sunstone, which is needed to enter Aenir, and the Primary Sunstone belonging to Tal's mother has faded in power due to her grave illness. Tal knows he must secure his family's standing lest they be demoted to Underfolk and any hope for curing his mother's illness will be gone.

Tal reluctantly visits his cruel aunts, who dislike Tal's family, to ask to borrow one of their Sunstones for his visit to Aenir but they refuse. At his aunts' quarters, he meets Shadowmaster Sushin, who appears to greatly dislike Tal, much to Tal's confusion. Tal attempts to win a Sunstone by entering the Achievements of Luminosity competition. He enters the Achievement of Body category, but discovers he was mysteriously re-registered to the Achievement of Music roster. With help from his great-uncle Ebbitt, Tal finds a piece of music to play for the competition at the last minute. Upon entering the contest, he finds, much to his horror, that Sushin is one of the three judges. Tal performs the piece well, but is given the Yellow Ray of Failed Ambition by Sushin, and the other judges agree that Tal did not perform well enough to win a Sunstone.

Tal then goes to visit the Empress of the Chosen to ask for a Sunstone. He makes a deal with the palace guards that if he can beat them in a game of Beastmaker, he may receive an appointment with the Empress. Despite a rocky start, Tal comes close to winning but Sharrakor, the Empress' Spiritshadow, viciously stops the game. The frightened guards force Tal to leave.

Great-Uncle Ebbitt advises a desperate Tal to steal a Sunstone from the Red Tower, which is the least guarded tower in the castle. With his shadowguard, Tal climbs the tower towards the Veil where the Sunstones are kept. Just as Tal is about to grab a Sunstone, he notices his little brother secretly followed him and is struggling to fend off a mysterious Spiritshadow. Tal climbs down to help him and briefly fights with the Spiritshadow, which has no master and calls itself the "Keeper." Although Tal's brother escapes safely, Tal is thrown off the tower and falls into the icy world outside of the castle.

He is rescued by a clan of Icecarls and meets Milla, an aspiring Shield Maiden warrior who is hostile to Tal. The leaders of Milla's clan decide that they will send Milla to help Tal re-enter the castle and secure a Sunstone. In exchange, Tal will also steal a Sunstone for Milla's clan.

Reluctantly, Tal and Milla agree to join forces and prepare to journey across the ice together.

== Publication history ==
The series launched in June 2000, with subsequent novels being released every three months. As part of a marketing campaign, Scholastic issued a national print ad campaign, created a Seventh Tower Web site and a Seventh Tower hotline that children could call, as well as distributing one million Seventh Tower teaser booklets to children in the U.S. through its network of Scholastic school book clubs. The cover design and art were created by Madalina Stefan and Steve Rawlings, respectively.

== Critical reception ==
The Fall received positive reviews upon its publication. Common Sense Media said, "Kids who enjoy this first volume of his adventures should jump right into the rest of the books in this series; the story gets even better as Tal finds out more about the truth behind the Castle, the Dark World, and the Veil."
