= Castle (novel) =

2000 book by Garth Nix

- Author: Garth Nix
- Illustrator: Steve Rawlings
- Cover artist: Madalina Stefan
- Language: English
- Series: The Seventh Tower
- Genre: Fantasy novel
- Publisher: Scholastic
- Publication date: September 2000
- Publication place: Australia
- Media type: Print (Paperback)
- Pages: US:224
- ISBN: 0-439-17683-2
- OCLC: 45080971
- LC Class: CPB Box no. 1880 vol. 18
- Preceded by: The Fall
- Followed by: Aenir

Castle is the second book in Garth Nix's The Seventh Tower series, published on 1 November 2000 by Scholastic. The cover design and art are by Madalina Stefan and Steve Rawlings respectively.

== Plot ==
Tal and Milla make it from the shadowy 'Dark World' to the titular castle, a seeming place of peace. Both are unwanted by the castle's inhabitants, Milla the most. The two must avoid conspiracies and other dangers inside the castle, just to survive.
