= Drowned Wednesday =

2005 book by Garth Nix

- First edition (Australia)
- Author: Garth Nix
- Cover artist: Sandra Nobes / Hofstede Design (paperback, Allen & Unwin)
- Language: English
- Series: The Keys to the Kingdom
- Genre: Fantasy, Young adult novel
- Publisher: HarperCollins (UK), Scholastic Press (US); Allen & Unwin (AUS)
- Publication date: 1 March 2005
- Publication place: Australia
- Media type: Print (paperback, hardcover)
- Pages: 390 (paperback, HarperCollins)
- ISBN: 0-439-70086-8
- OCLC: 56058209
- LC Class: PZ7.N647 Dr 2005
- Preceded by: Grim Tuesday
- Followed by: Sir Thursday

Drowned Wednesday is the third book in The Keys to the Kingdom series by Garth Nix. It continues the story of Arthur Pehaligon and his quest to fulfil a mysterious Will in order to reclaim an otherworldly House from seven antagonistic Trustees. Following the events of the previous novel, Arthur must secure the third part of the Will from a fiendish pirate in order to save the Border Sea from Drowned Wednesday's insatiable appetite.

== Plot ==
Picking up after the events of Grim Tuesday, Arthur discusses Drowned Wednesday's invitation to meet for lunch with Leaf while he is hospitalized. The two are skeptical as to whether Wednesday can be trusted, but then the hospital room is suddenly filled with water and the two find themselves transported to the Border Sea, Wednesday's domain. Leaf and Arthur are separated when Leaf is picked up by the Flying Mantis, a large ship, and Arthur is left behind. Arthur uses the Mariner's medallion to summon help but his call goes unanswered. A buoy marking the pirate Elishar Feverfew's treasure floats toward him, which Arthur opens. His hand is then marked with a bloody red color, the Red Hand, which he later learns is a spell created by Feverfew so that he may identify who has touched his treasure.

Arthur is eventually picked up a scavenging ship called the Moth. On board, Arthur (going by the name of Arth) is introduced to Sunscorch, the First Mate, and to Captain Catapillow. As they travel through the Border Sea, the Moth is attacked by Feverfew's ship, the Shiver. Sunscorch commands Dr. Scamandros, an Upper House Sorcerer and the ship's navigator, to open a transfer portal to elsewhere in the Secondary Realms. Scamandros' spell fails and he accuses Arthur of interfering with his magic. He advocates for throwing Arthur overboard, but Arthur shows them the Mariner's medallion and the crew agrees to keep him. With Arthur's help, the Moth successfully travels through a transfer portal to a safe spot. Arthur asks Scamandros to find out what happened to Leaf and using sorcery, Scamandros reports that Leaf has been conscripted to work on the Flying Mantis but is otherwise safe.

Arthur admits his identity to the crew and Scamandros helps Arthur contact Dame Primus and Wednesday's Dawn, so he may meet with Wednesday. Before Arthur leaves, Scamandros gives Arthur his transfer watch.

Arthur meets with Wednesday, who explains that she regretted her part in defying the Will, especially since doing so afflicted her with gluttony and turned her into a leviathan with an insatiable appetite. She attempted to convince Superior Saturday to allow Wednesday to relinquish her part of the Will but instead, Saturday and the other Trustees (with the exception of the then-slothful Mister Monday) ambushed Wednesday and revoked most of the Third Key's power. As such, Wednesday can only use her Key to maintain a human form but only temporarily. She tells Arthur that she will relinquish the Key once he has reclaimed the third part of the Will, which has been hidden by Feverfew.

Wednesday's Dawn takes Arthur to the Triangle to begin his search for the Will. He meets the Raised Rats, a group of anthropomorphic rats brought to the House by the Piper, and makes a deal with them to take him Feverfew's hideout, which is a worldlet located within Drowned Wednesday's stomach when she is in her leviathan form. On the Raised Rats' ship, Arthur inadvertently summons Scamandros with the transfer watch but Scamandros is grateful. He explains that Feverfew has taken the Moth and Scamandros was briefly poisoned by Nothing in the scuffle. Arthur checks in on Leaf using Scamandros' scrying mirror and learns that Feverfew has captured the Flying Mantis and he has discovered Leaf's connection to Arthur. Feverfew deduces Arthur is looking for the Will and sets about to catch him, led by the Red Hand.

Suzy Turquoise Blue joins Arthur on the Raised Rats' submersible and Scamandros provides Arthur and Suzy with disguises in order to sneak into the worldlet. Although they experience navigational difficulty, they are eventually able to enter Wednesday's stomach and the worldlet therein, which is in the form of an island. There, Arthur and Suzy, disguised as rats, find several of Feverfew's escaped slaves, who have been hiding in a remote cave on the island and formed a religion around a Carp. The exiles take them to the Carp, which is the third part of the Will.

They attempt to take the Will out of the worldlet but Feverfew catches up to them, holding Leaf as prisoner. He proposes a fight between him and Arthur wherein each may try to kill the other with one strike. Arthur goes first and fails, but he successfully dodges Feverfew's attack and severs his head. But because Feverfew is a Denizen, he begins to regenerate. Thinking quickly, Leaf kicks his head into a mud puddle containing Nothing, thus destroying him. Upon Feverfew's death, the worldlet begins to collapse. Via the Moth, Arthur and his friends are able to escape. Lady Wednesday is healed from her gluttony but she dies, having been poisoned by the worldlet, which had opened a void to Nothing.

Dame Primus reunites with Arthur and absorbs the third part of the Will. Arthur, now Duke of the Border Sea, appoints Sunscorch as his Noon and Scamandros as his Dusk and for them to run the Sea while he and Leaf return to the Secondary Realms.

== Publication history ==
Drowned Wednesday published on March 1, 2005, from Scholastic in the United States. It was the first book in the series to receive a debut hardcover edition, accompanied by a simultaneous re-release of the previous books in the series in hardcover format.

== Critical reception ==
Drowned Wednesday received mixed to positive reviews upon its release. School Library Journal called it "[a] must-have for anyone who has the first two entries in this well-crafted, exciting series" and VOYA magazine said, "Nix is endlessly inventive, and his latest book is another thrill ride." Booklist was more mixed, praising the imagination of the series but said that "experiencing it can be at once exhilarating and overwhelming," and noted that new readers could find the book "frustratingly esoteric." Similarly, Fantasy Book Review gave it a 7 out of 10, saying that Drowned Wednesday did not match the previous standard of the previous books in the series, but it would still leave the reader anticipating the sequel. Rebecca Fisher of Fantasy Literature gave it 4 out of 5 stars, saying, "Nix brings fresh ideas to the fantasy genre" but noted that Drowned Wednesday was not as gripping as previous installments.

== See also ==
- The Keys to the Kingdom
