= Mister Monday =

2003 book by Garth Nix

- First edition (US)
- Author: Garth Nix
- Cover artist: John Blackford
- Language: English
- Series: The Keys to the Kingdom
- Genre: Fantasy, Young adult novel
- Publisher: Scholastic Press (US); Allen & Unwin (Australia); HarperCollins (UK)
- Publication date: 1 July 2003 (US)
- Publication place: Australia
- Media type: Print (Paperback)
- Pages: 445
- ISBN: 0-439-55123-4
- OCLC: 52498186
- LC Class: PZ7.N647 Mi 2003
- Followed by: Grim Tuesday

Mister Monday is the first novel in the series The Keys to the Kingdom by Garth Nix. It follows Arthur Penhaligon, a twelve-year-old boy who becomes the heir to the center of the universe, called the House, and must fulfil a mysterious Will in order to claim it from seven antagonistic Trustees.

== Plot ==
Twelve-year-old Arthur Penhaligon is experiencing a severe asthma attack at school when two mysterious men, Mister Monday and his butler Sneezer, appear in front of him. Sneezer convinces Monday to give Arthur his Key, an object of great power, in order to fulfill Monday's directive from the Will of the Architect (god). Although Monday is skeptical, Sneezer argues that Arthur will die shortly and the Key will then be returned to Monday. However, Monday realizes Sneezer is possessed by the Will, and attacks Sneezer. Sneezer and Monday disappear, leaving a small book in their place, which Arthur takes. Fortunately, Arthur is saved by his half of the Key, as well as school officials arriving with help.

Arthur spends Monday through Thursday in the hospital and is visited by his new friends, Leaf, and her brother Ed. Leaf confirms that she also saw Monday and Sneezer, and Ed adds that they saw dog-faced men digging up the school field looking for something. Arthur realizes that they are looking for his Key, which mysteriously reappeared under his pillow. Once back at home on Friday, Arthur uses the Key to open the book, titled "A Compleat Atlas of the House and Immediate Environs", which describes the House, its resident beings, regions, as well some information on the so-called secondary realms (the universe). Just after midnight on Monday, he is attacked by one of the dog-faced men that Leaf and Ed saw, described as "Fetchers" by the Atlas. The Key protects Arthur by bringing his ceramic Komodo dragon to life to fend off the Fetcher.

The next day at school, Arthur learns that Leaf and Ed have contracted a mysterious disease. More Fetchers attempt to pursue Arthur along with Monday's Noon, a more powerful being. Arthur manages to mostly evade them, but the Fetchers steal the Atlas. His day is further interrupted when a medical team announces a city-wide quarantine as the mysterious disease spreads. Arthur realizes the Fetchers are spreading the disease and he decides to enter the House in hopes of finding a cure.

Without help of the Atlas, Arthur attempts to navigate his way through the Lower House, which he discovers is a fragment of a world unto itself, around which the Universe is organized, created by a divine being called "the Architect." The Architect went away and entrusted the seven Trustees known as "the Morrow Days" to fulfil her Will. Prior to the Architect's departure, she imprisoned her consort, the Old One, for meddling with the Secondary Realms (the universe). Without guidance from the Architect or the Old One, the Morrow Days each fell victim to one of the seven deadly sins and the House descended into chaos. As the Rightful Heir, Arthur must find the seven parts of the Will hidden by the Morrow Days and reclaim all parts of the House in order to fulfil the Architect's Will and restore the House to its original purpose.

To secure the Lower House from Mister Monday, Arthur must claim the Hour Hand from him. On his journey, Arthur is attacked by a group of Nithlings, creatures born from Nothing, but he is saved by a Cockney girl named Suzy Turquoise Blue, an agent of the first fragment of the Will. However, the group is Ambushed by Monday & his primary supporters, Dawn, Noon, and Dusk, as well as their own aids. Suzy and the Will escape, but Arthur is trapped in the Deep Coal Cellar. While in the cellar, he meets a Denizen called Prauvil, who later betrays Arthur, for he is secretly an agent for one of the Morrow Days, Superior Saturday. Arthur also encounters the Old One, who warns him that if he uses the Key too often, he will become a Denizen (one of the residents of the House), and his presence on Earth would cause great harm to those around him.

The Will advises Arthur and Suzy on how to break into Monday's quarters, or "Dayroom" as it is called. Arthur successfully reclaims the Lower House and gains the Hour Hand, which combines with the Minute Hand to become the First Key of the House. Now freed, the first part of the Will takes the form of Dame Primus. Arthur decides to use the First Key to heal Mister Monday from his affliction of Sloth, before turning governance of the Lower House to Dame Primus. Arthur receives a cure for the Fetchers' disease, as well as a telephone to use in emergencies, and returns home, relieved that his adventures in the House are over.

However, just past midnight Tuesday, he receives a call on the emergency line, leading into the next book, Grim Tuesday.

== Publication history ==
Mister Monday published on July 1, 2003, from Scholastic. In 2007, as part of a promotional campaign, a British bookstore chain gave away at least 50,000 copies of Mister Monday to accompany pre-ordered copies of J.K. Rowling's Harry Potter and the Deadly Hollows.

== Critical reception ==
Mister Monday received generally positive reviews upon its initial release. Publishers Weekly gave it a starred review, saying, "With a likeable unlikely hero, fast-paced plotting and a plethora of mystical oddities (e.g., Mister Monday only has "dominion over everything" on Mondays), this series is sure to garner a host of fans." BookPage praised the worldbuilding of the series, noting, "Nix traps the reader in his world much as the House traps Arthur." Fantasy Book Review praised Nix's writing and favorably compared him to Roald Dahl, noting how the story contained multiple layers for adult and young adult readers. Ruth Arnell of Fantasy Literature gave it four out of five stars, saying, "Recommended for anyone who enjoys fantasy targeted to the younger set, but which is still interesting enough for an adult." The novel received the Aurealis Award for Children's Long Fiction in 2003 and the audiobook edition of Mister Monday was named a Selected Audiobook for Young Adults by the American Library Association.

== Film adaptation ==
In 2019, Deadline reported that Herschend Entertainment Studios purchased the film/television rights to the Keys to the Kingdom series, with Nix to serve as an executive producer.

== See also ==
- The Keys to the Kingdom
