= Above the Veil =

2001 book by Garth Nix

- Above the Veil book cover
- Author: Garth Nix
- Illustrator: Steve Rawlings
- Cover artist: Joan Moloney
- Language: English
- Series: The Seventh Tower
- Genre: Fantasy novel
- Publisher: Scholastic Press
- Publication date: 1 April 2001
- Publication place: Australia
- Media type: Print (Hardback & Paperback)
- Pages: 248
- ISBN: 0-439-17685-9
- OCLC: 46451790
- LC Class: CPB Box no. 1881 vol. 26
- Preceded by: Aenir
- Followed by: Into Battle

Above the Veil is the fourth children's book in Garth Nix's The Seventh Tower series, published in 2001 by Scholastic.

== Plot summary ==
While Shadowmaster Sushin maintains control over higher ranked chosen, Tal and Milla travel through the Castle's depths where they encounter the Freefolk, a group of the servant class Underfolk who possess a great hatred for all the Chosen. They also meet Lector Jarnil, a famous teacher. Tal and Milla learn more about the intricacies of Castle politics, including that Sushin, a Shadowmaster of the Orange, is the Dark Vizier of the Empress. He deals in unsavory matters and commands others under the authority of the Empress. They also learn that the Veil is maintained by the seven Keystones which lie at the top of each of the seven towers.

Most of the Chosen leave the Castle due to the Day of Ascension. To prevent the Veil from failing, Tal, accompanied by the Freefolk leader Crow, climb the Red Tower and defeat the deadly Keeper. They also solve a puzzle of tiles to prevent any alarms from ringing out. Eventually they reach the Red Keystone and discover Lector Jarnil's cousin Lokar trapped inside. As Tal and Crow prepare to depart, they are assaulted by numerous unbound Spiritshadows. Tal is able to construct a miniature Veil in time to hide them, but accidentally binds Adras, his Spiritshadow, into it. As they near the Freefolk base, Crow injures Tal and flees with the Keystone. Tal recovers the keystone and Lokar convinces Tal to go to Aenir and consult the Empress to free Lokar.

While Tal and Crow climb the tower, Milla returns to Odris by the labyrinth of tunnels below the Castle. On her way, she discovers the skeleton where her Primary Sunstone partially originated. Scrutinizing it closer, she notices a long Violet fingernail, which she puts on. Knowing that she will give herself to the Ice, she breathes the Tenth Pattern to assure the completion of her task of getting a Primary Sunstone. On her way, she is attacked by Arla and a band of Shield Maidens for bringing Odris. Milla accidentally kills Arla with her talon. She is then judged by the Crones, who will decide her fate. After reviewing Milla's thoughts and dreams, the Crones debate and decide to attack the Castle to stop the Spiritshadow trade and save the Veil. The Crones choose Milla to lead the attack.

== Critical reception ==
In a review on the website Writers Write Claire E. White noted: "This is a fantastic series which just gets better and better with each book."
