= The Ragwitch =

1990 novel by Garth Nix

- Original 1990 edition
- Author: Garth Nix
- Cover artist: Jonathan Nix
- Language: English
- Genre: Young adult, children's, Fantasy
- Publisher: Tor Books (US) HarperCollins (UK) Pan Macmillan (Australia)
- Publication date: 1990
- Publication place: Australia
- Media type: Print (Paperback)
- Pages: 396 (paperback, HarperCollins)
- ISBN: 0-00-717499-3 (paperback, HarperCollins)
- OCLC: 61321684

The Ragwitch is a young adult horror/fantasy novel by Garth Nix. The book was first published in 1990 by Pan Macmillan. It was again published in 1995 by Tor Books and first published in Great Britain in 2005 by HarperCollins.

== Summary ==
Julia and her brother, Paul, are spending a day by the beach when they discover a midden. They climb to the top, where Julia discovers a rag doll in a ball of feathers hidden in a nest. It turns out to be a powerful and evil witch, and it possesses Julia and spirits her away through a pyramid of fire. Paul manages to follow them and he finds himself in a strange country desperately unprepared for the return of the Ragwitch. At first, he meets the May Dancers, who after questioning him, lead him to the edge of the forest and set him free. The people of the land aid him as he searches for a way to free his sister, action following at every turn, as both Paul and Julia battle the Ragwitch; Julia from within Her, and Paul from outside. Paul collects several mystical objects from the powerful Elementals, before meeting with the Patchwork King, who forges for him a needle spear in order to kill the Ragwitch. There are no strong fighters to help Paul, no saviors for him and he must find his own way. Because Paul is no hero, his war is one of bravery and brains, not brawn. Julia tells her own story from the mind of the Ragwitch. Although she is much more courageous than Paul, her war is one of the mind, resisting the power of the Ragwitch from within the witch's body.

== Characters ==
Julia: "[S]trong-willed" Julia is Paul's sister. She is ensnared by the Ragwitch in the opening chapter.

Paul: The protagonist of the novel. Paul is Julia's brother.
