= The Violet Keystone =

2001 book by Garth Nix

- The Violet Keystone book cover
- Author: Garth Nix
- Illustrator: Steve Rawlings
- Cover artist: Joan Moloney
- Language: English
- Series: The Seventh Tower
- Genre: Fantasy novel
- Publisher: Scholastic
- Publication date: 1 December 2001
- Publication place: Australian
- Media type: Print (Hardback & Paperback)
- Pages: 240
- Preceded by: Into Battle

The Violet Keystone is the sixth and last book in Garth Nix's The Seventh Tower series, published in 2001 by Scholastic.

The cover design and art are by Joan Moloney and Steve Rawlings respectively.

== Synopsis ==
Tal and Milla, along with some allies, are now face to face with the evil that plans to destroy their world. In this book, they travel one last time to Aenir, release their bonded Spiritshadows, and confront the mighty dragon Sharrakor.

== Publication history ==
After the novel's initial publication by Scholastic it was reprinted by HarperCollins in 2010 and then translated into German in 2002, Portuguese and Czech in 2003, and Swedish in 2005.
