= The Seventh Tower =

Book series by Garth Nix

The Seventh Tower is a series of six books written by Garth Nix, the result of a joint partnership between Scholastic and LucasFilm. The series follows two children from distinctly different societies in a world blocked from the sun by a magical Veil that leaves the world in complete darkness.

Tal is a Chosen from the Castle, and Milla is an Icecarl from the Ice. Together they discover that an evil, long thought to have vanished, once more threatens their world, slowly and secretly letting its presence be felt. A pact was broken, and a war dormant for two thousand years is rekindling. Danger looms, and it is up to these two children and a small band of unlikely heroes to save their Dark World.

== Books ==
The books are as follows:

1. The Fall (2000)
2. Castle (2000)
3. Aenir (2001)
4. Above the Veil (2001)
5. Into Battle (2001)
6. The Violet Keystone (2001)

== Background ==
The series was created when an editor from Scholastic emailed Nix saying he liked Nix's previous book Sabriel, and that he would be glad to work with him on something in the future. A few months later, Nix received another email from the editor saying Scholastic and LucasFilm were working to create a new fantasy series. He asked if Nix would be interested, to which Nix replied that he might be. They discussed it back and forth through email.

Several months later, Scholastic and Lucasfilm gave Nix a general list of "influences and ideas" to base the series on. However, Nix was still given much freedom to expand from it to create a story of his own. "In a way, each of the ideas and influences on the original list was like a seed," says Garth Nix. "The seeds were planted in my imagination and things have grown from them, and I have helped them grow and shaped them to fit into the story." Among the points included on the list was a world "where it is always night for some reason" and characters with magical companions of some sort.

The series was written at a rather quick pace, as fast as three to four months per book. By June 2000, the first book entitled The Fall came out. The Seventh Tower has since gone on to sell more than one million copies in the US, and more than 6 million copies around the world.

== Reception ==
The series has been generally well received:

"Garth Nix has created a wonderful fantasy world with this series... The young boy Tal and his reluctant (and somewhat grumpy) companion Milla are an interesting pair and their journey is full of surprises. Garth has a great gift for characterization and pacing, and he has a sly sense of humor which always entertains."

— Claire E. White, The Internet Writing Journal
