= Superior Saturday =

Novel by Garth Nix

- Australian cover
- Author: Garth Nix
- Language: English
- Series: The Keys to the Kingdom
- Genre: Fantasy, Young adult novel
- Publisher: US:Scholastic Press; UK: HarperCollins; AUS: Allen & Unwin
- Publication date: UK: 1 July 2008; AUS: June 2008. US: 1 August 2008
- Pages: US:288, UK:323
- ISBN: 0-439-70089-2
- Preceded by: Lady Friday
- Followed by: Lord Sunday

Superior Saturday is the sixth novel by Garth Nix in his The Keys to the Kingdom series. It tells part of the story of a boy named Arthur as he tries to gain control of a magical world.

== Plot ==
=== Background ===
Arthur Penhaligon is a young boy who has gotten involved with the 'House', a magical world. This world comprises seven parts, each containing a 'Key' (powerful magical objects) and a part of the 'Will' (a being that holds the wish of the absent 'Architect'), under control of a villainous 'Trustee'. Arthur is on a quest to defeat the 'Trustees' and fulfill the 'Will'.

In the preceding five books, Arthur has captured five parts of the House. Superior Saturday, the Trustee that Arthur fights in this book, has appeared earlier in the series, trying to hinder Arthur.

=== This book ===
At the start of the book, Saturday is talking to a servant about her plan to invade Sunday's (the last Trustee) part of the House, which is above hers. Meanwhile on Earth, Arthur discovers that the national army plans to fire a nuclear bomb on his hometown, so he uses the fifth Key to stop time. Then, however, he finds out that he is more than 3/5 immortal, meaning his presence brings harm on Earth, so he goes back to the House, only to find that part of the House collapsing and to narrowly escape death.

He reaches the prison of the divine being called the 'Old One', who is locked up for interfering with the affairs of mortals. The Old One, who has grown in power and killed his jailers, gives no clear answers to his questions. Arthur goes to another part of the House to plan a preemptive strike on Saturday. He learns that Saturday has deliberately destroyed the lower parts of the House so that the growth of the enormous trees that support Sunday's realm will slow, allowing her to invade from below. Arthur convinces his steward Dame Primus to split herself in two, to take care of the House while he seizes the last Keys from Saturday and Sunday. Arthur finds Dame Primus to be acting suspiciously.

Arthur, together with his ally Suzy with her small fighting unit, infiltrate Saturday's part of the House, where Saturday is preparing to invade from a tower that now is high enough. Arthur discovers that the sixth part of the 'Will' is hidden in the rain, and manages to reconstitute it, but then he is separated from Suzy by Saturday's troops. He disguises himself as one of Saturday's sorcerers in hopes of rescuing Suzy, but is caught up in Saturday's assault force. In Sunday's realm, he tries to call the sixth Key to him while Saturday is distracted, but as he is doing this, Saturday casts a spell that throws him off the edge. The outcome is unrevealed.

The book ends back on Earth with Arthur's friend Leaf getting as many people as possible into a bomb shelter together with a hospital staff member.

== Publication details ==
Superior Saturday, like many books of the Keys to the Kingdom series, was first released in Australia, being released in early June 2008. The expected release date was 1 July 2008 in the United Kingdom, and 1 August 2008 for the United States. However Barnes & Noble released it on Monday, 7 July.
