= Lady Friday =

2007 novel by Garth Nix

- Australian Cover
- Author: Garth Nix
- Cover artist: Sandra Nobes / Hofstede Design (paperback, Allen & Unwin)
- Language: English
- Series: The Keys to the Kingdom
- Genre: Fantasy, Young adult novel
- Publisher: HarperCollins (UK); Scholastic Press (USA); Allen & Unwin (Australia)
- Publication date: 2007
- Publication place: Australia
- Media type: Print (hardback & paperback)
- Pages: 278 pp.
- ISBN: 0-00-717509-4
- OCLC: 76359863
- Preceded by: Sir Thursday
- Followed by: Superior Saturday

Lady Friday is the fifth novel by Garth Nix in his The Keys to the Kingdom series. It was first published in 2007 by HarperCollins in the United Kingdom, Scholastic Press in USA, and Allen & Unwin in Australia.

== Plot ==
=== Background ===
Arthur Penhaligon is a young boy who has gotten involved with the 'House', a magical world. This world comprises seven parts, each containing a 'Key' (powerful magical objects) and a part of the 'Will' (a being that holds the wish of the absent 'Architect'), under control of a villainous 'Trustee'. Arthur is on a quest to defeat the 'Trustees' and fulfill the 'Will'.

In the preceding four books, Arthur has captured four parts of the House.

=== This book ===
On Earth, the fifth Trustee, lady Friday, is masquerading as a doctor, whom everybody likes because she is very beautiful and refined. It is later revealed that Friday has kidnapped thousands of people and taken them to another world. There, she drains from them their emotions and memories, which she drinks in order to experience them (being a Denizen, she cannot have these experiences herself).

Arthur, the sixth trustee Saturday and another powerful Denizen called the Piper all receive a message from lady Friday that she has abdicated the rule of her part of the House, called the 'Middle House', and that the first of them to reach her scriptorium can claim the fifth Key and her domain as their own. Along with each message is sent a 'transfer plate' that sends whoever touches it straight to the Middle House (which is a giant, terraced mountain). Arthur accidentally uses the plate.

The Piper is the boss of a group of children, among which are Arthur's friends Suzy and Fred; these two friends along with Ugham, a servant of the Piper who is loyal to them, take the Piper's plate and are also transported to the Middle House. At first, Arthur does not trust them because of their allegiance to the Piper, but they convince him. He uses the fourth Key to remove their bindings, which bound them to the Piper's will.

They come upon a fight between Friday's flying troops and Saturday's troops. Arthur helps defeat the latter, and in return Friday's servants take him to their nest, where they find the fifth part of the Will, which takes the form of a creature with body parts of different animals. Then they go to Friday's scriptorium, where the Piper orders Ugham to take what looks like the fifth Key. It turns out to be a trap that opens a 'void' that starts to grow. Arthur is forced to use all four Keys in his possession to close it.

They eventually get to the world where Friday has kidnapped the people; Friday has lost her self-control and is about to "experience" thousands of people at once using her Key. As Arthur has succeeded Friday as ruler of the Middle House, he is able to stop her. It turns out that Arthur's friend Leaf was among the kidnapped people. The book ends with a note that Suzy got from Ugham before his death, which reads: "For the last time, I do not wish to intervene. Manage affairs in the House as you wish. It will make little difference in the end. S".

== Characters ==
- Arthur Penhaligon - the main character, a 12-year-old boy.
- Suzy Turquoise Blue - a 'Piper's child', a friend of Arthur.
- Fred Initial Numbers Gold - a 'Piper's child', a friend of Arthur.
- Banneret Ugham - created by the Piper, soldier and guardian of Suzy and Fred.
- The Piper - a son of the 'Architect' and the 'Old One'. Brought the Piper's children into the House and controls them with his pipe.
- Leaf - Arthur's friend on Earth.
- Lady Friday - the fifth 'Trustee'.
- Dame Primus - humanlike form of the parts of the 'Will' that Arthur has freed so far; acts as his steward while he is away from the House.

== Publication history ==
After the novel's initial publication by HarperCollins, Scholastic Press and Allen & Unwin in 2007 it was reprinted as follows in 2018 by Allen & Unwin in Australia.

In 2019 it was included in The Keys to the Kingdom Complete Collection, published by Allen & Unwin.

The novel was also translated into German and Polish in 2008, Japanese in 2011, and Chinese in 2013.
