= Angel Mage =

2019 book by Garth Nix

- Author: Garth Nix
- Genre: Young adult science fantasy
- Publisher: HarperCollins
- Publication date: October 1, 2019
- Publication place: Australia

Angel Mage is a 2019 young adult fantasy novel by Garth Nix.

== Plot ==
Angel Mage is set in an alternate version of Europe, with its action taking place mainly in Sarance (analogous to France) and partly in Ystara (analogous to the Iberian Peninsula).

In this universe, humans can summon angels to perform magic for them by touching an icon of the angel and requesting its aid within its scope; however, summoning any angel comes at the cost of aging the mage, and the more powerful the angel, the greater the cost and the more difficult the summoning. Angels are also bound to specific areas and regions and cannot act outside the nation of their host.

In Ystara, a mysterious plague sweeps the nation. Most of its victims are killed as their blood transforms into a substance resembling ash. However, some are changed into “beastlings”: hideous, vicious monsters that kill and devour anything they can. The Archbishop of Ystara has lost the ability to summon Palleniel, the country's archangel, and suspects this loss and the plague are somehow the doing of Liliath, a young mage of extraordinary abilities, who has fled into Sarance with her followers. Ystara gradually falls into decay, with only beastlings left alive within its borders.

One hundred and thirty-seven years after the Doom of Ystara, Liliath awakens from the enchanted sleep she had put herself under when she hears Palleniel's voice, informing her that the event she has been awaiting has come to pass, and that there are four “candidates”. She learns that the descendants of Ystarans are known as Refusers and live as an underclass in Sarance due to their inability to use or be affected by angelic magic. If they are touched by it, they either die instantly of the Ash Blood plague or are transformed into beastlings. Liliath reveals her identity to a select few Refusers, including Bisc, the leader of a criminal organization called the Night Crew. With them, she travels to the capital city of Lutace under the assumed identity of a foreign noblewoman, Lady Dehiems of Alba, and sets about finding her four candidates.

At the Star Fortress, a prison outside Lutace which is being renovated into a palace, four young people encounter each other seemingly by chance. Henri Dupallidin, a clerk in Cardinal Duplessis's service, and Agnez Descaray, a new cadet in the Queen's Musketeers, have been assigned to the Fortress by their superiors. Due to a mysterious accident, Simeon Macneel, a student doctor, has been expelled from a teaching hospital in Lutace, but is permitted to study at the fortress in exchange for his swearing his allegiance to Rochefort, the captain of Duplessis's Pursuivants. Dorotea Imsel, a scholar of Belhalle University, is a “guest” of the Cardinal due to her unusual ability to make icons rapidly, which is suspiciously reminiscent of other heretical figures in history, one of them being Liliath. When the four meet each other, they immediately feel as though they have met before, even though they are strangers to one another, and they arrange to meet again the next day.

Unbeknownst to her followers, Liliath gains her power and her ability to use magic without aging by consuming and destroying angels. While she waits for Bisc to bring her news of her “four”, Liliath learns that his leadership has been challenged and the matter will be settled by combat. Liliath fights as Bisc's champion and wins. Cardinal Duplessis, sensing the angelic disturbance caused by Liliath's actions, dispatches her Pursuivants to arrest the Night Crew.

The following day, the four young people meet together at a secluded part of the Star Fortress near a small pond, in which a group of Refusers appear to be searching for something. A fight breaks out among the Refusers, and they flee. The four discover in the water the body of Bisc's rival, alongside a chest containing Ystaran coins, an old letter, and what Dorotea recognizes as three of the twelve Diamond Icons stolen from the Sarancian royal palace, one hundred and forty years earlier. Henri deciphers the letter, which purports to be from Liliath at the time of the theft, instructing an unnamed thief to bring the last of the icons to the Temple of Pelleniel Exalted at Baranais, just over the Ystaran-Sarancian border.

The four report their find to the authorities and are brought before the Queen. Liliath also arrives in her guise as Lady Dehiems, bearing a chest identical to the one found by the four, this one containing a map. Liliath falsely claims that the first chest was stolen from her home and that the thief who took the icons must have been a long-ago ancestor who fled to Alba. It is revealed that the map contains directions to Baranais; the Queen, as Liliath expected, decides to dispatch an expedition across the border to see if the remaining Diamond Icons or any other treasures are to be found at the Temple of Palleniel Exalted. The four young people are commanded to go on the expedition, along with the Refusers who were arrested, and Liliath disguises herself again as one of these.

After the expedition has crossed the border, Liliath springs her trap. With her accomplices, she captures the four and takes them to the temple. There, Liliath retreats to her workroom with Dorotea and reveals her plan. In her first youth, Liliath fell in love with Palleniel and attempted to cause him to manifest in the body of her mortal lover. However, the man's form was not strong enough to contain the angel, and Palleniel's essence spilled out into all the people of Ystara, resulting in the Ash Blood plague. Determined not to be thwarted, Liliath put herself to sleep to wait for her people's descendants to grow strong enough for her to choose a new vessel from among them. Traces of Palleniel remain in all those of Ystaran descent, and Liliath intends to gather these traces together and place them in this vessel; for this purpose, Liliath has selected Dorotea. However, Dorotea resists the process and, in doing so, accidentally grants Liliath her desire: she forces both the angel and the essence of the mage together into the heavens, fusing them to become a new angel, Palleniath. The beastlings of Ystara revert to their human forms, showing that the Doom of Ystara has lifted.

== Reception ==
The book was praised by critics, particularly for its unique system of magic, and its blending of high and low fantasy. Bruce Hale of the New York Journal of Books described it as a "rollicking blend of horror story, adventure, and fantasy".

In a review for Locus, Carolyn Cushman and Amy Goldschlager noted the book's many references to Alexandre Dumas' The Three Musketeers. The book has also been noted for its fully fleshed characters, and prominent representation of racial and sexual diversity.

The book received the 2019 Aurealis Award for Best Science Fiction Novel.
