= A Confusion of Princes =

Novel by Garth Nix

- First edition (AUS)
- Author: Garth Nix
- Language: English
- Genre: Young adult, children's, Fantasy, Science Fiction
- Published: 2012
- Publisher: Allen & Unwin (AUS); HarperCollins (UK & US)
- Publication place: Australia
- Media type: Print (Paperback)
- Pages: 352 (HardCover, HarperCollins)
- ISBN: 978-0060096946 (HardCover, HarperCollins)
- OCLC: 779833109

A Confusion of Princes is a young adult novel written as a standalone space opera by author Garth Nix. The book was published on May 15, 2012, by HarperCollins.

The novel takes place in an intergalactic empire, run by an aristocracy of highly trained and telepathic individuals called princes. These princes are screened by the empire and taken away from their families at a young age, then trained in isolation until adulthood. Each prince is supported by a staff of priests, who can telepathically communicate with the princes.

== Plot summary ==
The story introduces Khemri, a Prince, as he finishes his training and reaches adulthood. Khmeri believes he is destined for a life of luxury and freedom, however, within moments of leaving his home, he barely manages to survive several assassination attempts with the help of his first priest; his Master of Assassins. The Master of Assassins, named Haddad, tells him that he is in grave danger because princes are vulnerable to true death before they are able to link in to the Imperial Mind. The Emperor, through the Imperial Mind is the supreme commander of the Empire, but it cannot see its subjects unless they link with it. Khemri and the Master of Assassins then set out for the nearest conduit to the Imperial Mind to make Khemri less vulnerable. The nearest conduit is on Kwanantil 9, a planet that is used as a training base by the Imperial Navy. The prince is upset that in order to access the Conduit, he must first enlist in the Imperial forces.

Upon arriving, Prince Khemri enlists in the Imperial Navy. The Priest receiving him oversees his access to the Mind, then tells him that he has been chosen by the Imperial Mind for a special task. Meanwhile, he refuses an offer from the Commandant of the base to join House Jerrazis, a middle tier House, or guild. As most of the cadets and officers at the academy are members, he becomes a target for pranks and demerits making his life there an effective hell. Just as Khemri is prepared to beg the Commandant for another chance to join the House, the academy are attacked by a small Sad-Eye raiding party.

The academy as a whole is caught unawares but Khemri is doing extra drills as punishment for his demerits with Mekbi Troopers, modified humanoid soldiers treated as disposable. Though he and all his Mekbi troops are killed, they successfully repel the Sad-Eye incursion, earning him several medals. The Commandant, who hates him, becomes mentally unstable after this and attempts to kill Khemri for resembling one of the academy's best cadets, Atalin. Khemri survives and manages to kill the Commandant; the Imperial Mind meanwhile hushes this up, and reports that the Commandant was killed in action against the Sad-Eyes. Despite this, it becomes clear to House Jerrazis that Khemri killed him; as a result, when his first year at the academy is over and he is eligible for duels, the Imperial Mind immediately transfers him to a supply station far away from the Empire. Though initially dreading the job, Khemri finds that the 'supply station' is in fact just a cover for the Adjustment service, the secret service of the Empire. He is then given a choice; either he can go through the test to become an Adjuster, or he can remain at the supply station, in which case he will be immediately assassinated by House Jerrazis. He chooses the test, and is given four months of training in four different artificial environments- but in a body that doesn't possess his augmented features.

Though initially his Princely arrogance causes him to be hunted down in several of the environments, he passes the training and moves on to the real test; he is sent out to a far away system, on Fringe space as a normal, unarmed, human. If he can find a temple and access the Imperial mind, he will have passed the test. Upon arriving there, however, he finds a dead ship, destroyed by an Imperial 'Null Wave', that destroys all Bitek and life. The ship is a missile launcher, and the missile has not been damaged; however, only one crew member is left alive, a stowaway called Raine, from the system Kharalcha, who is a member of the Kharalcha Space Forces, or KSF. she says that an Imperial ship, led by a Prince (later revealed to be Atalin, working for House Jerrazis) attacked the peaceful KSF, just as they had 9 years ago. The previous time, a group of pirates followed soon after, nearly destroying Kharalcha; this time, they are sure to do so again. However, if the missile can be launched, it can close the wormhole, preventing the pirates from coming, before help arrives. Raine and Khemri do so, escaping on his escape pod, though it is damaged, and they are forced to sedate themselves so that the oxygen they consume will be lowered. Khemri then awakes in Kharalcha, on an artificial space station. There, Raine and Khemri become romantically involved; however, soon after, the pirates arrive, help having come too late. Khemri is then forced to pilot an obsolete imperial ship to fight off the navy. He succeeds, but then dies, just as the Imperial mind re-establishes contact with him.

Upon waking up as a Prince again, he finds he has been nominated to take part in the competition for the Imperial throne. After an argument, Atalin and Khemri get into a duel, which Khemri wins, though he refrains from killing her because he discovers that she is his sister, and they are both two of the five possible candidates for the Imperial throne; the other 995 are just selected out of tradition. The 1000 Imperial candidates are then put through two tests; one of them tests their Psitek ability; all but the chosen five are killed here. Atalin and Khemri then kill the remainder of the chosen five. Rather than become Emperor, though, Khemri fatally injures Atalin, them kills himself so they die at the same moment, ensuring that she will become Emperor, on the condition that he is allowed to return to Kharalcha to be back with Raine; Atalin accedes to this request. The book then ends with Khemri being picked up by Raine.

== Setting ==
The setting is in the distant future, at least two thousand years after the Imperial system was established (but not explicitly stated just how long). The majority of the galaxy is under the control of the Empire; however, there are at least three other political entities stated; The Naknuk rebels, the Sad-Eyes, and the Deaders. Each of these, though, is reported to be militarily inferior to the Empire.

There are three 'teks', or technologies types used by the Empire; Bitek, which deals with biological weaponry and technology; Psitek, which deals with the mental equivalent of the former; and Mektek, which deals with the Mechanical equivalent of the former two. These are used as a 'Trinity' by the empire to defeat their enemies; the Sad-Eyes (which control beings mentally; they are called Sad- Eyes because the only part of the body they cannot control are the tear ducts), though stronger in Psi-tek, have limited Bitek and Mektek, and are defeated thus; the Naknuk rebels, former Imperial Princes (presumably of House Naknuk) focused entirely on Bitek, shunning the other two, as a result they are defeated; the Deaders, meanwhile, never allow themselves to be captured, if they are defeated, they self destruct – at the same time, they never take prisoners.

The Empire is ruled by an Emperor who abdicates after twenty years. Until then, they rule the Imperial Mind, which is actually the minds of the former Emperors, subsumed into the Mind till they are effectively one with it. The Emperor must be replaced every twenty years because after that, the Emperor is no longer able to keep from being subsumed.

The Empire is partially commanded by some 10 million Princes. They are taken at a young age, before they remember anything about their parents, selected by the ability to go through the process of becoming a Prince. After this, they spend most of the next ten years having Bitek, Psitek, and Mektek additions (though there is always some innate Psitek), until they finally end up spending the time until age 18 learning of the duties of the Prince and the Empire. Every 20 years, 1000 of these are selected to become Imperial Candidates – one becomes Emperor, while the rest are killed.

Houses are groups of Princes – ranging in size from a few dozen to tens of thousands – who function, effectively, as a support system for one another. They range from mutual aid pacts to guilds, depending on size and culture. The Naknuk Rebels were an Imperial House who split off to form their own Empire.

=== The Priesthoods ===
In the Empire are 16 "priesthoods" of the Emperor, each concerned with a particular "aspect", or service. The priests are the servants of the Imperial Mind (which in turn is subservient to the Emperor). Princes do not consider the Emperor a God, and nor do his priests. Priests are either assigned to Princes or to temples; at temples, new priests (of that particular aspect) are trained. The Aspects are

- Inquiring Intelligence
- Weighty Decision Maker: Specialists in genetic testing for choosing Prince Candidates
- Emperor's Loving Heart
- Shadowed Blade: Perform as assassins for Princes.
- Mending Hand
- Noble Warrior
- Cold Calculator: Specialists in calculating probability of events
- Emperor's Discerning Hand: Handle sensitive matters for the emperor. Decide whether Princes should be reborn.
- Inward Traveller: Specialists in Psitek, especially the 'witnessing' of events by the Imperial mind; they are the connection between the Imperial mind and the Princes.
- Kindly Gardener: Specialists in Bitek, includes medics and botanists.
- Rigorous Engineer: Specialists in Mektek, including small devices and weapons
- Companion of Life
- Instructive Father
- Joyful Companion
- Wrathful Foe
- Stern Adjudicator: Regulates the disputes between Princes, especially relating to duels.

=== The Imperial Services ===
The Princes serve the Emperor in seven different services:

- Imperial Survey: Finds wormholes, the primary method of FTL travel, suspected to have been set up by an ancient race.
- Navy: The space-borne branch of the military.
- Marines: The planet-based branch of the military; Mekbi troopers are under this command.
- Diplomatic Corps: Aids in diplomacy.
- Colonial Government: Aids in the Governance of the colonies.
- Imperial Government: Aids in the Governance of the Empire.
- Adjustment: Secret service of the Empire; the espionage service.

== Other media ==
The online computer game Imperial Galaxy is based on the book's universe, but was released before the book.
