= Sir Thursday =

Novel by Garth Nix

- First Australian edition
- Author: Garth Nix
- Cover artist: Sandra Nobes/Hofstede Design (paperback, Allen & Unwin)
- Language: English
- Series: The Keys to the Kingdom
- Genre: Fantasy
- Publisher: Scholastic Paperbacks (US); Allen & Unwin (AUS); HarperCollins (UK)
- Publication date: 1 March 2006
- Publication place: Australia
- Media type: Print (paperback & hardcover)
- Pages: 427
- ISBN: 0-439-70087-6
- OCLC: 61229579
- LC Class: PZ7.N647 Sir 2006
- Preceded by: Drowned Wednesday
- Followed by: Lady Friday

Sir Thursday is a young adult fantasy novel written by Australian author Garth Nix. It is the fourth book in the series The Keys to the Kingdom, and was released in March 2006. Sir Thursday continues from the preceding book, following the adventures of a boy named Arthur as he attempts to claim mastership of the fourth part of a magical world. As with the other books in the series, the theme of 'seven' is prevalent, along with the themes of sin and virtue. The book received generally favourable critical response, but was criticised for a slow pace, among other issues.

== Synopsis ==
=== Background ===
Arthur Penhaligon is a young boy who has gotten involved with the 'House', a magical world. This world comprises seven parts, each containing a 'Key' (powerful magical objects) and a part of the 'Will' (a being that holds the wish of the absent 'Architect'), under control of a villainous 'Trustee'. Arthur is on a quest to defeat the 'Trustees' and fulfill the 'Will'.

In the preceding three books, Arthur has captured three parts of the House.

=== Plot ===
The book begins with Arthur and his friend Leaf attempting to return to Earth after their adventures. While Leaf is able to pass through the front door and return to Earth, the presence of a magical doppelgänger of Arthur prevents him from doing so, and he is forced to remain in the House.

His steward Dame Primus then informs him that two Trustees Arthur previously defeated have been assassinated. Moments later, he is drafted into the army and is sent to fight in the chessboard-like fourth part of the House, called the 'Great Maze'. Also arrived recently is a boy named Fred, who becomes his friend. The leader of the army is the fourth Trustee, Sir Thursday. The army is currently involved in a campaign against the powerful 'Piper', who is trying to claim the fourth Key.

While in the army, Arthur's memory is wiped. One month later and during the first battle against the Piper's army, Arthur begins to recall his identity. The entirety of it is recovered later in the book when an officer mentions his name and title.

On Earth, Arthur's double, known as the 'Skinless Boy', has thrown a hospital near Arthur's home into panic by infecting staff and patients with a fungal extraterrestrial life-form which allows him to read and eventually control their thoughts and actions. This fungus is mistaken for a biological weapon, and the hospital is put under quarantine. Leaf infiltrates the hospital, seeking to obtain and destroy the magical object used to create the Skinless Boy: a pocket torn from one of Arthur's shirts. She succeeds, but is infected by the fungus in the process. She then leaves the hospital, only to find that the entrance to the House has appeared above it and cannot be reached from the ground. With the help of a retired pharmacist named Sylvie, Leaf makes her way to Arthur's house where she uses a special telephone to contact Arthur's friends and get help, just as the fungus gains full control of her body.

Arthur's House ally Suzy arrives and takes the pocket to the House. There, she finds Arthur and Fred, and joins them in a raid led by Sir Thursday to find and destroy the New Nithlings' weapon, which is preventing the mechanical floor of the Great Maze from being used to the army's advantage. Arthur destroys the weapon by throwing the pocket into it, simultaneously destroying the Skinless Boy. As Arthur escapes from the Piper with Sir Thursday, he distracts Thursday enough for the fourth part of the Will to break free, whereupon it makes Arthur the owner of the fourth Key and commander of the army. With help from Dame Primus and others from the parts of the House already under his control, Arthur defeats the army of the Piper.

On Earth, Leaf wakes up in a hospital a week after the Skinless Boy was defeated. She soon learns from a nurse that the Grayspot has disappeared and that Lady Friday, another Trustee, has become a doctor on Earth.

== Characters ==
=== Major characters ===
- Arthur Penhaligon – the protagonist of the book, Arthur is a human asthmatic, who was chosen to take back the magical world called the 'House'. Arthur shows a strong sense of right and wrong, as well as a reliance on friends and allies.
- Dame Primus – Arthur's steward, the humanlike form of the three parts of the 'Will' that Arthur has freed in the preceding books. She is portrayed as caring little for others, becoming easily annoyed if they seem to be slowing the process of restoring the House.
- Sir Thursday – the ruler of the fourth part of the 'House', a military person who believes in order and control.
- Leaf – Leaf is one of Arthur's few human friends.
- Suzy Turquoise Blue – Suzy Turquoise Blue is another friend of Arthur, a House inhabitant.

=== Minor characters ===
- Part Four of the Will – takes the form of a snake.
- Fred Initials Numbers Gold – a House inhabitant who provides Arthur with information and support.
- The Piper – a powerful inhabitant of the House who also seeks to claim the fourth part of the House.

== Themes ==
As with the previous books in the series, the themes of seven, sin and virtue are prevalent throughout Sir Thursday providing the personality characteristics for many of the main characters.

In Sir Thursday, readers are also introduced to the power issues that Arthur begins to struggle with – his natural compassion and desire for fairness and kindness, against the characteristics displayed by Dame Primus and other House creatures, and the influence of the 'Keys', the powerful magical objects that he acquires throughout the series. In addition, the idea of Arthur losing his mortality by use of the Keys is further explored, with Arthur often choosing to refrain from using the Key – and the power it represents – to ensure he remains human.

The book also loosely explores the dangers of anger, and actions taken in anger. It is only Sir Thursday's loss of control and subsequent murder of two people that allows Arthur to gain control of the fourth Key, assisted by Thursday's servants.

== Critical reception ==
The book received generally favourable reviews. It is ranked 4 stars by Amazon users, and The Times stated "Nix's imagination is matched only by his prose style."

In particular, the book was praised for its originality, intricacy, action and characters. VOYA says that the book "..is well written, action packed, imaginative, and full of quirky memorable characters...", and Children's Literature agrees that "It is a readable choice..." The School Library Journal also extensively praised the book, saying "Reluctant or 'hard to fit' readers will find this series enjoyable, as Nix is able to create vivid pictures in the minds of his readers. Fans of the fantasy genre will appreciate these books for their strong continuity, believable characters, and edge-of-your-seat-action. This offering complements the series' well-established structure."

The book did, however, receive consistent criticism. The most common complaint was on the speed of the plot – the School Library Journal summarises all the comments, saying that "the events move a little slower than in previous installments..." – and the difficulty in entering the series without reading all the previous books first: VOYA simply says "readers attempting to enter the series through this volume are likely to be quickly lost." Children's Literature also criticised the repetition of previous content, saying there is "..entirely too much front matter [which] sags with the necessity of replaying earlier story lines."
