= Grim Tuesday =

2004 book by Garth Nix

- First Australian edition
- Author: Garth Nix
- Cover artist: Sandra Nobes/Hofstede Design (paperback, Allen & Unwin)
- Language: English
- Series: The Keys to the Kingdom
- Genre: Fantasy, Young adult novel
- Publisher: HarperCollins (UK); Scholastic Paperbacks (USA); Allen & Unwin (Australia)
- Publication date: 1 January 2004
- Publication place: United States
- Media type: Print (paperback, hardcover)
- Pages: 390 (paperback, HarperCollins)
- ISBN: 0-00-717503-5 (paperback, HarperCollins)
- OCLC: 56446409
- Preceded by: Mister Monday
- Followed by: Drowned Wednesday

Grim Tuesday is the second novel in the series The Keys to the Kingdom by Garth Nix. It continues the story of Arthur Pehaligon and his quest to fulfil a mysterious Will in order to reclaim an otherworldly House from seven antagonistic Trustees. Following the events of the previous novel, Arthur must face off against Grim Tuesday and protect the House and the human world from destruction.

== Plot ==
Set immediately after the events of Mister Monday, Dame Primus informs Arthur that six months have passed in the House since he left and Grim Tuesday, the second of the Morrow Days, has found a loophole in the Trustees' agreement to conquer the Lower House. Dame Primus tells Arthur that he must return to the House to restore order.

With help from Leaf, Arthur returns to the House and travels to the Far Reaches, a vast and expansive cavern filled with forges and a large spring of Nothing, which are used to create and ship out the supplies that maintain the House's various functions. However, Tuesday's greed has grown such that he dug out the spring even further, creating a highly toxic and unstable massive pit that threatens the foundation of the House. Nevertheless, Tuesday continues to plunder the pit and the Secondary Realms for more wealth, which he then hoards in his Treasure Tower.

Upon his arrival, Arthur is mistaken for one of Tuesday's indentured servants and forced to work in the pit, where he meets Japeth, who provides information about the Far Reaches. Suzy Turquoise Blue finds them and takes them to Tuesday's tower, which holds the second Will fragment and the Second Key. The three decide that Japeth will take Suzy's vehicle to catch up with the work gang while Arthur and Suzy break into the tower. They reach the tower by crossing the ceiling of the Far Reaches, only to find that the tower is surrounded by a giant glass pyramid. Soot, a large mass of Nothing that used to be Tuesday's eyebrow, gives them a diamond to cut through the glass pyramid, in exchange for helping it into the Treasure Tower so Soot can consume Tuesday's treasures.

Arthur and Suzy break into the treasure tower, where they meet Tom Shelvocke, also known as the Mariner. He is the second son of the Architect and the Old One and he has been blackmailed into guarding the Will for Tuesday. As revenge on Tuesday, The Mariner agrees to transport Arthur and Suzy to a worldlet inside a bottle, in which the second part of the Will is located. They retrieve the Will, which is in the form of a lazy sun bear, and return to the tower. As a reward for freeing him, the Mariner gives Arthur a whalebone disc that can summon the Mariner three times and obtains him aid from any sea-faring Denizen.

Tuesday finds them and the four escape through a weirdway into another part of the glass pyramid. Arthur and Suzy are then notified by one of Grim Tuesday's servants that the East Buttress of the Far Reaches is giving out, and that if it is not repaired, its collapse will lead to the destruction of the House and the Secondary Realms as well. Tuesday catches up to them and the Will declares a contest between Arthur and Tuesday in order to decide to whom the Will and the Second Key will go to. The contest is to create something original with the Second Key, a pair of silver gauntlets with the power to create anything desired by the wielder. Tuesday creates a beautiful tree of precious metals while Arthur creates a xylophone, which he then uses to compose a simple melody. The Will declares Arthur the winner, because he created something original while Tuesday copied another artist's work.

Arthur then hurries to mend the eastern buttress, where he encounters a mysterious high-ranking Denizen, whom Arthur assumes was sent by Superior Saturday. The two fight and Arthur stabs the Denizen, which drives it away. Arthur finishes repairing the buttress and then collapses from exhaustion.

When he awakens, Arthur is officially declared Lord of the Far Reaches; as with the Lower House, he appoints Dame Primus (who has now absorbed the second part of the Will) as his steward. Arthur learns that his time in the house and his use of the Keys has caused him to slowly begin the transformation into a Denizen, thus losing his humanity. At Arthur's request, Dame Primus reverses the effects but in doing so, Arthur becomes severely weakened. Upon his return to the Secondary Realms, Arthur is hospitalized.

When he wakes up after a long rest, Arthur discovers an invitation from Drowned Wednesday asking to meet.

== Publication history ==
Grim Tuesday published on January 1, 2004, from Scholastic in the United States and it was released on June 7, 2004, in the United Kingdom from HarperCollins (UK).

== Critical reception ==
Grim Tuesday received generally positive reviews upon its initial release. School Library Journal wrote, "Arthur Penhaligon's adventures are absorbing and entertaining, with worthy characters and thought-provoking situations." Fantasy Book Review gave it a 9 out of 10, saying, "Grim Tuesday has an even faster pace with thrilling scenes of fights, a haunting description of a tortured being and creatures that threaten to remove your eyes if they catch you" and calling the book, as well as the series, "good reading for a reader of any age."

== See also ==
- The Keys to the Kingdom
