= Ferenc Körmendi =

Hungarian writer (1900-1972)

Ferenc Körmendi (12 February 1900, in Budapest – 20 July 1972, in Bethesda MD, USA) was a Hungarian novelist very popular in the period between the two world wars. After periods of exile, he finally settled in the USA in 1946.

== Life ==
The Italian translation of 1933 of Körmendi's experimental novel

From an assimilated middle class Jewish background, Ferenc Körmendi studied law, history and music theory at university, afterwards working as an official and a journalist. During this time he published a collection of short stories titled Martyr (1921).

His literary breakthrough came in 1932, when he won an international competition organized by English language publishers in the UK and USA with his novel Escape to Life (Budapesti kaland). This contributed to his success across Europe and even the Hungarian edition of the novel sold 15,000 copies in a few months. Between 1932-2010 the book was to go through 72 editions published in ten languages. Books by Körmendi were subsequently translated into twenty-five languages, of which seven novels alone were published in Italian by the prestigious Bompiani. On one reading tour in Italy in 1936, he was given a warm reception by Benito Mussolini. Nowadays his writing is compared in Italy to that of Alberto Moravia.

In 1939, after the implementation of anti-Jewish labour laws in Hungary, Körmendi emigrated to London, where he joined the Hungarian section of the BBC World Service. Although he revisited Hungary in 1948 for Hungarian Book Week, he would not stay after the Communist takeover. The rest of his life was passed in the United States, where he worked for the Voice of America.

== Novels ==
Ferenc Körmendi was characterised by literary historian Lóránt Czigány as among those writers who were “entertainers of the Middle Classes”. The key to their success was their handling of ordinary human problems in novels about the ‘man in the street’ whose lives were just a little more adventurous than the common life of the middle class. His novels of the 1930s deal with social themes, while those that came later and were written abroad deal more openly with politics.

Escape to Life (Budapesti kaland, 1932) has as subject a Hungarian emigrant on a visit to his native land after becoming a millionaire somewhere in southern Africa. He is invited to a school reunion, where his scheming school-fellows seize the chance to try and make money out of him. The verdict of Graham Greene when reviewing the English edition was that if Körmendi had had as much satiric detachment as he had psychological insight, he might have written a great novel.

Another early novel, Via Bodenbach (Ind. 7. 15 via Bodenbach, 1932, English translation 1935), experiments with the technique of interior monologue and free association, psychological flashbacks and complex presentation of a stream of consciousness, marred however by the theatricality of its ending. The title relates to the rail route to Berlin. Four travellers bound there for the length of the journey in a single compartment are the focus of the story.

The Happy Generation (A boldog emberöltő, 1934; English translations 1945, 1949) shows the disillusionment of the author’s generation, born around the turn of the 20th century in Austro-Hungary, at a period of prosperity and with hopes which were soon betrayed. This made Körmendi the spokesman of the unemployed and disillusioned young men of the Budapest middle-class who now considered themselves failures.

The Sinners (Bűnösök 1935), was translated into English in 1948. It is a murder story involving the death of illusions in which the relations between men and women are perceived as so 'fragile and intangible that in the end only suffering proves their existence’.

That one mistake (A tévedés, 1938) was translated in three editions in the UK and USA during 1947-8 and relates the story of the marriage of a small-time lawyer to the daughter of a wealthy manufacturer. The breakdown of the marriage is charted against the background of life at work and at home and the different social classes in Budapest society.

Adversary of men: an historical fantasy in three acts (1941) appeared while Körmendi was working in London. On its cover was a caricature by Feliks Topolski of Adolf Hitler brooding over conquered Paris.

Weekday in June (Júniusi hétköznap, 1943) focuses on the single day of a young man who has lost his job due to the Hungarian anti-Jewish labour laws. That day is supposed to be the last before his emigration to Paris. The narrative also follows a former classmate’s life on the same day. That evening, the Jewish man becomes the victim of a terror attack that his classmate, a member of a radical rightist party, had organized. The event is based on the real attack in 1939 against people coming out from the Dohány Street Synagogue after a Friday evening service.

Years of the eclipse (1951) deals with the moral collapse of the young under the pressure of wartime. It was reissued the following year as The Forsaken (Popular Giant reprint) with a typical pulp fiction cover and the headline “Men were all she lived for”.

A final novel, The Seventh Trumpet (1953, republished in 2011) expressed the author's criticism of the Hungarian Communist regime and was published under the pen name of Peter Julian.
