= The Keys to the Kingdom =

Fantasy–adventure book series written by Garth Nix

- Scholastic Inc. Covers for Mister Monday, Grim Tuesday, Drowned Wednesday and Sir Thursday.
- Mister Monday; Grim Tuesday; Drowned Wednesday; Sir Thursday; Lady Friday; Superior Saturday; Lord Sunday
- Author: Garth Nix
- Country: United Kingdom
- Language: English
- Genre: Fantasy, thriller, young adult fiction
- Publisher: Scholastic Publishing
- Published: 1 July 2003 – 1 February 2010
- Media type: Print (hardcover and paperback); Audiobook
- No. of books: 7

The Keys to the Kingdom is a fantasy-adventure book series written by Garth Nix, comprising seven books published between 2003 and 2010. The series chronicles the adventures of a boy named Arthur, who becomes involved with a magical world called the 'House'; he is on a quest to take back the House from seven antagonistic 'Trustees'.

== Story ==
=== Plot ===
Arthur, a young boy, has a severe asthma attack one day as two mysterious people, one of which is called Monday, give him a 'Key', a magical artifact that saves his life, against Monday's intentions. He discovers there exists a world called the 'House', which is split into seven parts, each ruled by a 'Trustee', of which Monday is one. A divine being known as the 'Architect' has disappeared and left behind a 'Will', leaving the House and the seven Keys to her seven Trustees, but the Trustees have split up the Will and hidden the parts, intent on not letting the Will be fulfilled.

The first part of the Will has managed to break free and, by convenience, has chosen Arthur as the 'rightful heir' who must recover the other lost parts of the Will; this has led to Monday giving up half of his Key to him. In the first book, Arthur defeats Monday and takes control of the first part of the House. Books two to five follow a somewhat regular pattern: in each, Arthur tries to gain control over one part of the House, and ultimately succeeds after various challenges, setting free one part of the Will. Each book features one main antagonist, usually the Trustee of that part of the House, with the exception of one Trustee, Wednesday, who wants the Will to be fulfilled but has been overthrown by the other Trustees. Sometimes, the Trustees sow chaos on Earth while he is away in the House.

One important recurring part of the story is Arthur limiting his use of the powerful Keys, as using them too much will turn him into an immortal, and the presence of an immortal on Earth causes harm. Past six tenths 'Denizen', the process will be irreversible.

At the end of the sixth book, Arthur has freed the sixth part of the Will but not yet claimed that part of the House, and the sixth Trustee is busy invading the domain of the seventh Trustee. In the seventh book, Arthur ultimately manages to free the last part of the Will, but then everything is destroyed and Arthur faces the divine being known as the 'Architect', who explains that the true purpose of the Will was to let her die and hand over the responsibility of being Architect to him. Having become the New Architect, he recreates the universe as it was, though the House will be made anew. He splits himself into the New Architect and a human Arthur, whom he sends back to Earth.

=== Characters ===
- Arthur Penhaligon – A 12-year-old boy who is chosen to take back a magical world called the 'House' from the seven 'Trustees' and free each Trustee's part of the 'Will'
- Leaf – A 12-year-old human girl who befriends Arthur. She becomes involved with Arthur's adventures in the House.
- Suzy Turquoise Blue – A female inhabitant of the House, a 'Piper's Child' (meaning she was brought there by the 'Piper') who chooses to work with Arthur and becomes his friend. Has been in the House for centuries, but has the appearance and behaviour of a child.
- Fred Initial Numbers Gold – Another 'Piper's Child', a cheerful, talkative, happy-go-lucky boy who quickly befriends Arthur.
- Dame Primus – The personification of the parts of the 'Will' that Arthur has taken back so far at any point in the series.
- The Trustees – Each named after a day of the week and embodying one of the seven deadly sins; they are the rulers of the seven parts of the House and Arthur's antagonists.
- The Mariner – A powerful independent inhabitant of the House, an ally to Arthur for most of the series.
- The Piper – Another powerful independent House creature, boss of the 'Piper's Children'. Intends to take control of the House.
- The Architect – God figure. Creator of the House and the Secondary realms. Mother of the Piper, the Mariner, and Lord Sunday.
- The Old One – Prometheus figure, condemned to the "coal cellar" to have his eyes gouged out every 12 hours. Husband of the architect and father of the Piper, the Mariner, and Lord Sunday.

=== World ===
Central to the story is the magical world called the House. The house is divided into seven parts, each with its Trustee:

- The Lower House – ruled by Mister Monday. Contains the prison of the divine being the 'Old One', contains the 'Front Door', which is a dome with many two-way portals including one connected with Earth, and the 'Seven Dials', which allows travel to anywhere in the universe.
- The Far Reaches – a grand cavern containing a massive pit, ruled by Grim Tuesday.
- The Border Sea – an ocean, formally the domain of Drowned Wednesday but not under her control.
- The Great Maze – a gigantic, chessboard-like battlefield, the squares of which teleport every dusk, ruled by Sir Thursday.
- The Middle House – a giant, thrice-terraced mountain, ruled by Lady Friday.
- The Upper House – a tower of nearly 2,000 floors, the place where sorcerers are trained, ruled by Superior Saturday.
- The Incomparable Gardens – the most important and oldest part of the House, a beautiful garden, ruled by Lord Sunday

House time is constant, while time in the universe is malleable; it is even possible to make it flow backwards with sufficient power, such as a Key. Thus, a day may pass on Earth while half a year passes in the House, or one might spend a year in a secondary realm only to return fifteen minutes later House time. The House has 'Elevators' that allow travel between the different demesnes. There are also attachable 'Wings' which are used as an everyday means of short-distance travel. The House has an internal postal service, but it is notoriously poor. In addition, there is a large number of telephones for long-distance communication.

The original inhabitants of the House are called 'Denizens' and are nearly immortal, though there are a few things that can kill them. Denizens are not supposed to interfere with the normal universe, but they are capable of this to some extent (a Trustee can only interfere in the secondary realms on their "day") and they do. Apart from original House creatures, there are also the 'Piper's Children' and 'Raised Rats' (a group of anthropomorphic rats), which were both brought into the House by an immortal called the Piper, and so-called 'Nithlings'. Nithlings are creatures that come into existence out of the magical substance 'Nothing'; they can kill Denizens and go to the universe freely, becoming sprites. Hordes of Nithlings fight with the Denizens, but there are also Nithlings that are allied with the Denizens and are used, for example, to wreak havoc on Earth.

The substance called 'Nothing' causes damage to things in the House and ultimately wipes it out when the Will is complete. One of the Trustees, Tuesday, makes various things out of it using his Key. The Piper creates an army of so-called 'Newniths' from it.

== Books in the series ==
The title of each book refers to the trustee who Arthur fights in the novel.

1. Nix, Garth (2003). Mister Monday. ISBN 0-00-717501-9.
2. Nix, Garth (2004). Grim Tuesday. ISBN 0-00-717503-5.
3. Nix, Garth (2005). Drowned Wednesday. ISBN 0-00-717505-1.
4. Nix, Garth (2006). Sir Thursday. ISBN 0-00-717507-8.
5. Nix, Garth (2007). Lady Friday. ISBN 978-0-00-717509-3.
6. Nix, Garth (2008). Superior Saturday. ISBN 978-0-00-717511-6.
7. Nix, Garth (2010). Lord Sunday. ISBN 978-1-74114-591-5.

== Possible film adaptation ==
In an interview, Garth Nix said that he was willing to sell the rights to studios and directors for an adaptation of the series, if they were "the right person". His reason is that he does not want to sell it to any studio over concerns that the studio would ruin the film. At the 2012 Texas Book Festival, Nix stated that "(I) have no plans for movies but would like to see a card game."

As of 2019, Herschend Entertainment Studios have secured the film and TV rights to the series, with Nix set to act as executive producer alongside Julie Philips, the vice president of Herschend.
