= The Moosepath League =

Series of novels by Van Reid

The Moosepath League saga is a series of historical novels by Van Reid. Set in the state of Maine in the late 19th century, they are on the surface comic novels, but contain strong elements of adventure, mystery, romance, and the occasional brushes with the supernatural. Reid has drawn on history, 19th-century literature and newspaper stories, folklore, and old family stories for his settings, characters, and themes. The first book in the series was picked as a New York Times Notable Book of 1998.

== Books ==
Title	Publication Date	Setting	ISBN
Cordelia Underwood, or the Marvelous Beginnings of the Moosepath League	1998	July, 1896	978-1-60893-518-5
Mollie Peer, or the Underground Adventure of the Moosepath League	1999	October, 1896	978-1-60893-520-8
Daniel Plainway, or the Holiday Haunting of the Moosepath League	2000	December, 1896	978-1-60893-522-2
Mrs. Roberto, or the Widowy Worries of the Moosepath League	2003	May, 1897	978-1-60893-524-6
Fiddler's Green, or a Wedding, a Ball, and the Singular Adventures of Sundry Moss	2004	June, 1897	978-1-60893-526-0
Moss Farm, or the Mysterious Missives of the Moosepath League	2012	September, 1896	978-1-60893-528-4

The first book in the series was initially published in serial form in the Lincoln County Weekly, Damariscotta, Maine under the title The Moosepath League, running from April, 1995 to June, 1997. Originally published by The Viking Press/Penguin Books, the Moosepath saga, as well as Peter Loon are currently being published by Down East Books, a subsidiary of the Rowman & Littlefield Publishing Group. New editions of the first two books include some new material — in each case, short passages left out of the original editions.

== Characters ==
The series follows the adventures and misadventures of five men, who form the titular gentleman's club. The founding members of the Moosepath League are:

- Mr. Joseph Thump — who first suggests the idea of forming a club while having dinner with his two friends
- Mr. Christopher Eagleton
- Mr. Matthew Ephram
- Mister Tobias Walton — the league's chairman
- Mr. Sundry Moss — "gentleman’s gentleman" and assistant to Mister Walton

Mister Walton is a genial Pickwickian character. Sundry Moss is nominally his valet but functions as general assistant and "fixer." Ephram, Eagleton and Thump are a trio of bumbling but thoroughly well-intentioned gentleman bachelors who inject comic farce into the proceedings. The characters are an homage to Charles Dickens' Mr. Pickwick and company. In chapter four of Cordelia Underwood, Cordelia finds a copy of The Pickwick Papers in her uncle's trunk.

Author Van Reid says that the names of the characters Ephram, Eagleton and Thump were chosen to evoke the sound of a heavy object falling downstairs. The name Tobias was consciously borrowed from the character of Uncle Toby in Laurence Sterne’s The Life and Opinions of Tristram Shandy, Gentleman; Walton from Izaak Walton, author of The Compleat Angler.

Ephram, Eagleton, and Thump adhere to different political parties, go to separate churches, subscribe to different newspapers, and are fascinated/obsessed with three distinct (if seemingly mundane) aspects of daily life – the time, the weather, and the tides, respectively.

While Pickwickian on the surface, Mister Walton (the moral core of the saga) is a more worldly personality than the aforementioned characters.

Sundry Moss is the only non-Portland native and, at 21, the youngest member in the Moosepath League's original roster, from the countryside.

Other recurring characters:

- Phileda McCannon — an attractive middle-aged woman who captures the attention and heart of Mister Walton;
- Horace McQuinn — a rascally fixture on the Portland Waterfront, whose apparent connections to less than legal activities and wry appreciation of the more innocent members of the Moosepath League occasionally make him a worthy ally;
- Maven Flyce — Horace's perpetually astonished and childlike friend;
- Charles Piper — Sheriff of Lincoln County;
- Colonel Roderick Taverner — United States customs agent
- The Underwood family — Leading figures of the first book in the series, they continue to be a presence of varying degree throughout the first six volumes.
- Priscilla Morningside — A cousin to Cordelia Underwood, the painfully shy Priscilla has captured the heart of Sundry Moss
- John Neptune — An elder of the Penobscot Tribe, descended from a long line of shamans

== Timeframes ==
Though there are occasional flashes back to earlier time periods, the major action of the first six books in the Moosepath Saga take place from July 1, 1896, to June 16, 1897. Each book typically encompasses about a month.

Peter Loon, now known to have real continuity with the Moosepath Saga, largely takes place in October 1801.

== Settings ==
The first six books in the Moosepath Saga take place entirely in the State of Maine, with the main body of each volume beginning in the City of Portland. As each book progresses, the characters’ adventures lead them to other Maine cities and towns such as Bangor, Bath, Brunswick, Wiscasset, Edgecomb, Freeport, South Freeport, Richmond, Dresden, Bowdoinham, and many more.

In recent speaking events, Reid has revealed that the main plot of the next book in the saga will take place largely in Nova Scotia.

With only the occasional exception, Reid's characters travel real streets, byways, and railway lines, visiting actual houses, businesses, institutions, and landmarks. Many readers (particularly summer visitors) have made a game of following the Moosepath League's circuitous wanderings and visiting those sites open to the public. Some of the most visible and visited sites include The Portland Custom House, Fort Edgecomb, the shell middens on the shores of the Damariscotta River, the old jail in Wiscasset, and various streets, corners, roads, and waterfronts. Geocaching has been reported at some of these sites.

== Timeframes and setting ==
Title	Main Timeframe	Main Locations
Cordelia Underwood	July 1 – 31, 1896	Portland, Freeport, South Freeport, Wiscasset, Boothbay Harbor, Damariscotta, Newcastle, Millinocket, Bangor, Ellsworth
Moss Farm	September 24 – October 1, 1896	Portland, Edgecomb, Saco
Mollie Peer	September 24 – Halloween, 1896	Portland, Bath, Brunswick, Cape Elizabeth, Hallowell, Arrowsic, Wiscasset, Edgecomb
Daniel Plainway	November 27 (Thanksgiving), 1896 – New Year's Day, 1897	Portland, Gilead, Hiram, Augusta, Skowhegan, Wiscasset, Hallowell, Iceboro (Richmond), Gardiner, Veazie
Mrs. Roberto	May 7 – June 3, 1897	Portland, Dresden, Bowdoinham, Iceboro, Orland, Bangor, Head Tide (Alna)
Fiddler's Green	June 3 – 16, 1897	Portland, China, Albion, Jackman Station

== Style and themes ==
The writing style in the Moosepath Saga has been variously compared to several 19th-century and early 20th-century authors. Reid has been quoted as saying it is a "modern gloss on a Victorian style". The comic aspect of the series plays on misunderstandings, eccentric characters and behavior, word-play, and even physical surprise and pratfalls. The humor is always good-natured, and the occasional ironic note is always wry and never bitter. The general tone of the books, even in the face (or memory) of tragedy, anger, or inhumanity, is always hopeful and optimistic. For Reid and his characters, there always seems to be light at the end of the darkest tunnel.
