= Mack Maloney =

US speculative fiction writer

- Born: 1952 (age 73–74); Boston, Massachusetts, US
- Occupation: Writer
- Writing career
- Period: 1987-Present
- Genres: post apocalypse, military sf, science fiction

Mack Maloney (born 1952) is the pen name of Brian Kelleher, an American writer of speculative fiction, predominantly known for the Starhawk, Wingman, Chopper Ops, and Pirate Hunters fiction series. Maloney received a BS in journalism from Suffolk University and an MA in film at Emerson College. He is the host of Mack Maloney's Military X-Files radio show on iHeartRadio.

== Select Bibliography ==
=== Starhawk Series ===
- Starhawk (2001)
- Planet America (2001)
- The Fourth Empire (2002)
- Battle at Zero Point (2003)
- Storm Over Saturn (2004)

=== Wingman Series ===
- Wingman (1987)
- The Circle War (1987)
- The Lucifer Crusade (1987)
- Thunder in the East (1988)
- The Twisted Cross (1989)
- The Final Storm (1989)
- Freedom Express (1990)
- Skyfire (1990)
- Return from the Inferno (1991)
- War of the Sun (1992)
- The Ghost War (1993)
- Target: Point Zero (1996)
- Death Orbit (1997)
- The Sky Ghost (1997)
- Return of Sky Ghost (1998)
- The Tomorrow War (1999)
- Attack on Area 51 (2013)
- Battle for America (2017)
- The Odessa Raid (2019)
- Battle of the Wingmen (2020)

=== Pirate Hunters ===
- The Pirate Hunters (2010)
- Operation Caribe (2011)
- Operation Sea Ghost (2015)

=== Chopper Ops ===
- Chopper Ops (2011)
- Zero Red (2011)
- Shuttle Down (2011)

=== Superhawks ===
- Strike Force Alpha (2015)
- Strike Force Bravo (2015)
- Strike Force Charlie (2015)
- Strike Force Delta (2015)

=== Starman ===
- The Kalashnikov Kiss (2019)

=== Standalone Novels ===
- Thunder Alley (1988)
- War Heaven (1991)

=== Nonfiction ===
- UFOs in Wartime: What They Didn't Want You To Know (2011)
- Beyond Area 51 (2013)
- Haunted Universe (2018)
