= List of Old Kingdom characters =

This is a list of characters from The Old Kingdom Series, a set of novels by Australian author Garth Nix. The series comprises six novels: Sabriel (1995), Lirael (2001), Abhorsen (2003), Clariel (2014), Goldenhand (2016) and Terciel and Elinor (2021). In 2006, Across the Wall: A Tale of the Abhorsen and Other Stories was released, which contained the novella The Creature in the Case, which was set after Abhorsen.

== Chlorr of the Mask ==
A powerful necromancer and later one of the Greater Dead. At the beginning of Lirael, she approaches antagonist Hedge at the Red Lake; but falls under his control. She wears a bronze mask over her face, giving her the name. Her story was further developed in Clariel: The Lost Abhorsen, wherein Clariel was the granddaughter of the Abhorsen. She was also a cousin of the royal family. Mogget manipulates Clariel and she becomes corrupted by Free Magic. Her face became horribly scarred in Clariel: The Lost Abhorsen leading her to don the bronze mask. She is exiled at the end of Clariel: The Lost Abhorsen. During this exile, Clariel adopted the name Chlorr when she chose to sacrifice her humanity in order to become more powerful and extend her life.

In Abhorsen, she is forced to flee the battle at the second binding of Orannis by Mogget and Lirael.

In Goldenhand she is also known as "The Witch with No Face". Over the centuries, Chlorr has been able to insert her spirit into different bodies whenever her current body is destroyed or rendered beyond repair/healing. Her bodies are young women supplied by the Northern Tribes. These women are called "Offerings" and their only purpose is to be a future vessel for Chlorr. They are groomed from birth to be a suitable host for her.

Chlorr's original physical body is a skeletal corpse buried in Life. Her burial site lies beyond "The Great Rift"; a desolate desert plain north of the Old Kingdom devoid of growth and air. Charter magic does not exist on this plain. A portion of her spirit is anchored in Death. This spirit portion is connected to her corpse in Life. Therefore, no matter how many times she is "killed"; Chlorr can always come back from Death due to her 'whole' spirit not being made to walk through the Ninth Gate.

== Corolini ==
Though unseen throughout the series, many references are made to Corolini in Lirael and Abhorsen, wherein Corolini is the leader of the extremist 'Our Country' Party, which holds the balance of power in Ancelstierre. He accepts huge sums of Old Kingdom gold to use his party's influence to send 200,000 refugees across the Wall, to death and enslavement by Hedge, and orchestrates the assassination attempt on King Touchstone and Abhorsen Sabriel. After this, he launches a coup; but fails to gain control over the Hereditary Arbiter (the Ancelstierran ceremonial head of state, similar to the King of England). Corolini's government has ceased to exist by the events of Creature in the Case.

== The Disreputable Dog ==
The Disreputable Dog is a remnant of the immortal 'Kibeth'; but refuses until the end of the story to identify herself as such. She is Lirael's constant companion throughout two of the three initial books. At intervals she changes her size and physique to suit the environment, or assumes various attributes (adhesive pads; enlarged teeth; or wings) to achieve the immediate need. Additionally she has the ability to cast Charter and Free Magic spells by barking; mostly to produce the involuntary movement of the subject. During the second binding of Orannis, the Disreputable Dog re-asserts her ancient role to achieve the same; then sacrifices herself to save Lirael. Abhorsen ends with her sending the recently dead Nicholas back to Life, while the Dog trots away along the border of Life and Death.

== Ellimere ==
The older sister of Sameth, and oldest child of King Touchstone and Abhorsen Sabriel. She is destined to be the next ruler of the Old Kingdom. She wields Dyrim in the second binding of Orannis.

Named for a friend of Sabriel's, who fell during the battle at Wyverly College.

== Hedge ==
Hedge is a necromancer in service of Orannis, who supplies Nicholas Sayre (in mistake for Prince Sameth) as the latter's avatar. He is roughly 100 years old. Motivated by an all-consuming desire for immortality, he believes that if he frees Orannis, he will become viceroy over the Dead; but fails when tricked into passing the Ninth Gate. It is suggested (in the prologue of Lirael; later in Abhorsen; and once in Nicholas Sayre and the Creature in the Case and then confirmed in Terciel and Elinor) that Hedge was once a member of the Crossing Point Scouts preventing Dead creatures from entering Ancelstierre, and a necromancer thereafter.

== Kerrigor ==
In Life named Rogir or Rogirek: the son of the previous Queen of the Old Kingdom, and half-brother of Touchstone/Torrigan. During his youth, he tried to make use of Free Magic, but was consumed by it and became one of the Greater Dead. Desirous of power, he attempts to destroy the Charter (killing most of his family in the process) and causes a long interregnum; but is ultimately placed in suspended animation by Sabriel.

In Goldenhand, (after discovering how Chlorr was able to come into power and extend her life), the Abhorsen theorized Chlorr was the one who corrupted Kerrigor.

== Lirael ==
Lirael, the protagonist of the second and third books, is Sabriel's younger half-sister on the father's side; but is unaware of this until her nineteenth year, and largely raised by her mother's relatives, the Clayr. Because she lacks the Clayr's precognitive 'Sight', she is considered an eccentric by her neighbors at the Clayr's headquarters, and prefers solitude to company. In young-adulthood, she joins the staff of the Clayr's Library, and acquires the Disreputable Dog; and with the latter's help, vanquishes a series of monsters in the Library itself. During a later exploration, she is identified as a 'Remembrancer' (a clairvoyant able, under special conditions, to accurately perceive the past), and immediately sent to rescue Nicholas Sayre. En route, she is joined by Prince Sameth (Sabriel's son by Touchstone) and Mogget, and discovers her own parentage at Abhorsen's House. Thereafter she and the dog conduct the second binding of the Destroyer. Lirael is next seen in Nicholas Sayre and the Creature in the Case, wherein she has been some time in practice as Sabriel's assistant and pending successor; but specializes here, as in the Library, in the incapacitation of monsters.

== Mogget / Yrael ==
The Eighth Bright Shiner, an immortal entity of Free Magic; originally neutral in the struggle between Orannis and the Seven, and afterward forced to serve the Abhorsen lineage, typically as advisor or moral-support. Until the end of the initial series, he resents this control, and if freed attempts to kill the current Abhorsen, but is usually confined anew. When confined he resembles a white cat, unless permitted by his current superior to assume a humanoid form; whereas the confinement itself appears as a collar or belt of red leather, distinguished by a bell (Saraneth originally, and Ranna in the second and third books) whose influence maintains his servitude. Throughout the story his role is largely the provision of wry or sometimes snide comments on the present situation. At the climax of the third book he assumes his true form and assists the imprisonment of Orannis. As Yrael he appears as a vaguely humanoid plume of blue-white, possibly electromagnetic energy. The nickname 'Mogget' is not identified; but may be traced to the Australian and British term 'moggy', an affectionate term for cats or any non-pedigree cat.

After the events in Abhorsen, Mogget is now unbound and roams The Old Kingdom of his own accord. Sabriel reports she rarely sees Mogget, although he does visit Prince Sameth from time to time. However, he is always in cat form when he visits.

== Nicholas Sayre ==
Nicholas is the nephew of the Chief Minister of Ancelstierre. Several months after being unknowingly invaded by a sliver of Orannis, Nicholas goes to visit Sameth in the Old Kingdom; but becomes possessed by Orannis himself. He dies toward the end of Abhorsen; but is resurrected by the Disreputable Dog. In the novella, Nicholas Sayre and the Creature in the Case, he assists Lirael in the imprisonment of a monster.

In Abhorsen, Nicholas died but was saved from a true death by the Disreputable Dog. She gave Nicholas a "late" baptism of a Charter Mark and preserved his spirit in Death. Due to being Orannis' vessel, Nicholas has powerful and strong Free Magic in his blood. The Disreputable Dog was able to balance out the Free Magic in Nicholas with baptism.

In Goldenhand, the Clayr Healers examine Nicholas and discover he is akin to a Charter Stone. He is a source of Charter Magic due to the powerful Free Magic and Charter Magic in his blood.

== Orannis ==
The antagonist Orannis, called the Destroyer, is a malevolent, interplanetary immortal referred to as the "Ninth Bright Shiner" desirous to destroy the biosphere of any planet it encounters, but eventually imprisoned by 7 of its 8 cohorts. In the novels Lirael and Abhorsen, it attempts self-resurrection aided by human agents, but is imprisoned again by the leading characters. When briefly free, it emits a series of 'manifestations', whereof the second resembles an atomic explosion; and when imprisoned, is confined in two immense metallic 'hemispheres', each containing half of its constitution, and further held by 7 apotropaic materials.

== Sabriel ==
Sabriel is the protagonist of the first novel, and a supporting character in the second and third. Sabriel's mother died shortly after birth, but her father, the Abhorsen Terciel, rescued Sabriel. By her father's wishes, Sabriel grew up in Ancelstierre after living a few years in the Old Kingdom with her father. Shortly before she is to graduate from her school, Wyverley College in Ancelstierre, a Dead servant of her father's gives her his bells and his sword. She interprets this to mean that her father is trapped deep in Death. She returns to the Old Kingdom to save her father. At the Abhorsen's house, she meets Mogget, and learns that there has been no king in two hundred years. When the house is besieged by the dead, Sabriel escapes by calling a flood and flying away with Mogget on a Paperwing (a spelled plane made of paper). When this crashes, Sabriel finds herself in the ships' graveyard of the royal house, where she frees Touchstone from suspended animation. They continue to the former royal city, where they find Sabriel's father's body, and she briefly revives him. Later, she and Touchstone return to Ancelstierre, to destroy Kerrigor. Nineteen years after the events of Sabriel, she has married Touchstone, who has become King, and has two children: Ellimere and Sameth; but her duties keep her incessantly busy. She is last seen in Abhorsen, wherein she represents the spirit 'Saraneth' at the binding of the Destroyer.

== Sameth ==
Sameth, called 'Sam' for short, is the son and younger child of Sabriel and Touchstone: a modest, intelligent, amiable, but often clumsy youth. His sole talent, and greatest enjoyment, is the creation of magical machines; and his greatest fear is that of inheriting his mother's office, though he is trained to do so. On the occasion that Lirael is identified as Sabriel's half-sister and heir, Sameth is identified with the otherwise extinct 'Wallmakers', and his talent as a manifestation of that identity. It is stated thereafter that his inventions prove 'most useful' to his relatives; and by virtue of a mutual quest for Nicholas Sayre, he is especially close to his aunt Lirael.

== Touchstone ==
Touchstone (formerly Torrigan) is the illegitimate son of the previous Queen of the Old Kingdom and an unidentified nobleman, and was therefore a member of the Royal Guard before the Queen's death. A childhood friend of his half-brother Rogir (Kerrigor), Touchstone entered a berserk state at the latter's murder of their mother, and the then-Abhorsen changed Touchstone into the figurehead of a ship in Holehallow, the Royal tomb. He was subsequently revived by Sabriel, and accompanied her to destroy Kerrigor. On this quest, he serves largely as a source of information; but once rescues Sabriel from Kerrigor's minions. In later books, he has married Sabriel and restored many of the Charter Stones that supported the Kingdom magically, and travels constantly to negotiate with other politicians. He represents Ranna in the binding of the Destroyer. The name of Torrigan is stated only at the binding, whereas that of Touchstone (bestowed by Mogget in the text) is used throughout the story, and may derive from Shakespeare's play As You Like It, wherein it is that of a jester. The reference is confirmed by both Sabriel and Touchstone himself, when both speak of 'Touchstone' as 'a jester's name' or 'fool's name' upon its introduction.
