= Approaching Oblivion =

Short story collection by Harlan Ellison

- First edition
- Author: Harlan Ellison
- Cover artist: Leo and Diane Dillon
- Language: English
- Genre: short stories
- Publisher: Walker and Company
- Publication date: 1974
- Publication place: United States
- Media type: Print (hardcover)
- Pages: 238
- ISBN: 0-8027-5541-0
- OCLC: 1134441

Approaching Oblivion is a collection of eleven short stories by American author Harlan Ellison. They had appeared in various magazines throughout the early 1970s with the exceptions of "Paulie Charmed the Sleeping Woman" which originally appeared in 1962 and "Ecowareness" which was previously unpublished.

According to the author's introduction, the book was originally conceived in 1970 as a call to action that would contain cautionary tales from Ellison's previous books. Over the ensuing protracted gestation period of four years, however, Harlan Ellison's personal outlook had gradually changed. This resulted in the inclusion of previously uncollected stories with underlying themes of disillusionment and futility in rebelling. Classic examples along these lines are the dystopian "Knox" and "Silent in Gehenna". Other notable stories include "One Life, Furnished in Early Poverty" which depicts a man meeting a younger version of himself as a child and finding himself unable to ease the pains of his own childhood. The encounter begins at Lathrop Grade School in Painesville, Ohio where the author himself attended elementary school and experienced many emotionally painful and physically brutal encounters with antisemitic prejudice recounted in the introduction.

The foreword by fiction author Michael Crichton paints a picture of Ellison as an energetic, eclectic, uncompromising, and sometimes obstinate individual. It also describes the resistance and resentment felt by many of the people who have worked with Ellison in the movie business.

== Contents ==
- "Forward: Approaching Ellison" by Michael Crichton
- Introduction: "Reaping the Whirlwind"
- "Knox"
- "Cold Friend"
- "Kiss of Fire"
- "Paulie Charmed the Sleeping Woman"
- "I'm Looking for Kadak"
- "Silent in Gehenna"
- "Erotophobia"
- "One Life, Furnished in Early Poverty"
- "Ecowareness"
- "Catman"
- "Hindsight:480 Seconds"
