= Across the Wall (book) =

Book by Garth Nix

Across the Wall: A Tale of the Abhorsen and Other Stories
- Dillon cover of US edition
- Author: Garth Nix
- Cover artist: Leo and Diane Dillon (US); Larry Rostant (UK, AU)
- Language: English
- Series: The Old Kingdom
- Genre: Fantasy
- Publisher: EOS (US); Allen & Unwin (AU); HarperCollins (UK)
- Publication date: 2005 (US, AU); 2006 (UK)
- Media type: Print
- Pages: 305 (US); 391 (AU); 352 (UK)
- ISBN: 0-06-074713-7 (US); 1-74114-701-8 (AU); 0-00-722145-2 (UK)
- OCLC: 57316647
- LC Class: PZ7.N647 Ac 2005 (US)

Across the Wall: A Tale of the Abhorsen and Other Stories is a collection of short stories by Australian writer Garth Nix, which return to the setting of his popular Old Kingdom series. A hardback edition was released in the UK on November 6, 2006.

There are two special editions of this book in the UK, one with "a unique cover" from WH Smith's, the other with a manuscript for a possible prologue and several other notes on the story of Lirael, available from Waterstone's. All UK editions will include an FAQ section with the author, in which he provides "vital answers". All thirteen main stories had been published prior to the release of Across the Wall, usually in magazines or anthologies.

== Contents ==
- "Nicholas Sayre and the Creature in the Case" — Originally published for World Book Day (as The Creature in the Case), this novella chronicles Nicholas Sayre's attempt to return to the Old Kingdom, involving a battle with a Free Magic horror in the process.
- "Under the Lake" — Based on the legend of Avalon. This story twists the myth of the Lady of the Lake, making her into a sinister monster who gives Excalibur to Arthur for motives that are not entirely pure.
- "Charlie Rabbit" — A war story about two brothers trapped in their basement after their house is destroyed during an air raid.
- "From the Lighthouse" — A story about a developer who, having been a victim of con artists, arrives at the tropical island he was "sold".
- "The Hill" — A story about a boy who tries to keep his great-grandfather's land from being sold by the boy's father.
- "Lightning Bringer" — A story about a man who seduces young women, eventually electrocuting them via lightning.
- "Down to the Scum Quarter" — A parody of the Choose Your Own Adventure books.
- "Heart's Desire" — A tale explaining the disappearance of Merlin and Nimue's role in it.
- "Hansel's Eyes" — A modern version of Hansel and Gretel.
- "Hope Chest" — A western shoot-em-up with a fantasy bend.
- "My Really Epic New Fantasy Series" — A farcical transcript of a speech given at a writing convention announcing a new fantasy series.
- "Three Roses" — A fable.
- "Endings" — An extremely short story about the meaning of sorrow and joy.

== Reception ==
Kirkus Reviews referred to Across the Wall as a "grand fantasy adventure tale" with "a nice range of writing from one of the leading fantasy writers at work today".
