= Old Kingdom (disambiguation) =

The Old Kingdom is the period in the 3rd millennium BC. when Egypt attained its first continuous peak of civilization in complexity and achievement.

Old Kingdom may also refer to:

- Old Kingdom (book series), a high fantasy book series
- Romanian Old Kingdom, the territory covered by the first independent Romanian nation state
- Old Kingdom of Norway
- Old Kingdom of the Hittites
