= Abhorsen =

2003 novel by Garth Nix

- First edition
- Author: Garth Nix
- Cover artist: Leo and Diane Dillon
- Language: English
- Series: Old Kingdom series
- Genre: Fantasy novel
- Publisher: HarperCollins
- Publication date: 2003
- Publication place: Australia
- Media type: Print (Hardcover, Paperback), Audio Cassette, Audio Download, e-book
- Pages: 528 (paperback edition)
- ISBN: 978-0-06-052873-7 (paperback edition)
- OCLC: 54391493
- Preceded by: Lirael: Daughter of the Clayr
- Followed by: -

Abhorsen is a fantasy novel by Australian writer Garth Nix, first published in 2003. It is the third book in the Old Kingdom series (following Sabriel and Lirael).

Abhorsen features Lirael, who is the recently revealed Abhorsen-in-Waiting; Prince Sameth, who is Lirael's new-found nephew and descendant of the Wallmakers; Mogget, a bound servant of the Abhorsen line; and the Disreputable Dog.

The novel is named after the position of Abhorsen in the book's world. The origin of this title is known: Nix chose the name referencing "Abhorson", the executioner in Shakespeare's Measure for Measure.

== Plot summary ==
The Abhorsen's House is besieged by Dead Hands led by Chlorr of the Mask under the control of Hedge the Necromancer, who in turn serves Orannis the Destroyer. With the help of their familiars Mogget and the Disreputable Dog, protagonists Lirael and Sameth escape the House and depart for the Red Lake, where the Destroyer is being unearthed, to rescue Sameth's friend Nicholas Sayre from the Destroyer's control, and prevent the Destroyer from consuming the world. Meanwhile, Prince Sameth's parents, the Abhorsen Sabriel and King Touchstone, are in Ancelstierre to stop the slaughter of refugees forced into the Old Kingdom; but themselves become victims of an assassination attempt and barely escape. En route to the Red Lake, Lirael uses her Remembrancing powers to determine the means of re-imprisoning Orannis, and later defeats Hedge. In the end, all the leading characters re-enact the original binding of the Destroyer, with each member holding a bell to represent its namesake: King Touchstone (Ranna) and Abhorsen Sabriel (Saraneth), Sanar and Ryelle (Mosrael), Ellimere (Dyrim), the Disreputable Dog (Kibeth), Sameth (Belgaer), and Lirael (Astarael). When the re-enactment fails, Sameth frees Mogget, who identifies himself as the spirit 'Yrael', and imprisons the Destroyer. As Lirael prepares to give the necessary final blow, the Disreputable Dog sacrifices herself to complete it, in Lirael's place. In the epilogue, the Dog revives Nicholas, and herself departs along the border of Life and Death.

== Characters ==
- Lirael - New Abhorsen-in-waiting, daughter of the Clayr, and Remembrancer.
- Hedge - An evil necromancer who serves Orannis
- Orannis - The Destroyer, formerly a powerful free magic creature. The other seven Bright Shiners defeated and bound it.
- Prince Sameth - Sabriel's and Touchstone's son, prince of the Old Kingdom. Descendant of the Wallmakers and the ex-Abhorsen-in-waiting.
- Disreputable Dog - Lirael's best friend, a free magic and Charter sending that Lirael summoned from a dog statue that she found in the library. The Disreputable Dog is actually what was left of a Bright Shiner from when the great Charters were created; she is Kibeth, the Walker.
- Mogget - Abhorsen's servant in the form of a cat. Can also change shape into an albino dwarf. Another leftover from when the great Charters were created; he is the Eighth Bright Shiner, Yrael. He did not take sides for or against the creation of the Charter.
- Sabriel - Abhorsen and Queen of the Old Kingdom.
- King Touchstone - King of the Old Kingdom. Originally named Torrigan, he took on the name Touchstone when he claimed the Old Kingdom Throne. Named for the motley fool in As You Like It by William Shakespeare.
- Nicholas Sayre - An Ancelstierren friend of Sameth, avatar of Orannis, the Destroyer.
- Princess Ellimere - Princess of the Old Kingdom, next in line to the throne.
- Chlorr of the Mask - One of the greater dead, follows Hedge's wishes. Close to the end of the book, Mogget hints that Chlorr was once an Abhorsen.

== Literary significance ==
Abhorsen was a joint Aurealis Award winner for Best Young Adult Novel 2003. The novel was a Teens' Top Ten selection for 2003 by the Young Adult Library Services Association.
