= Leo and Diane Dillon =

American husband-and-wife illustrator duo

Leo Dillon
- Born: Lionel John Dillon Jr. March 2, 1933; East New York, Brooklyn, New York, United States
- Died: May 26, 2012 (aged 79); United States
- Education: Parsons School of Design
- Known for: Illustration
- Spouse: Diane Dillon
- Children: 1
- Awards: List of awards

Diane Dillon
- Born: Diane Clare Sorber; March 13, 1933 (age 93); Los Angeles, California, United States
- Education: Parsons School of Design
- Known for: Illustration
- Spouse: Leo Dillon
- Children: 1
- Awards: List of awards

Leo Dillon (March 2, 1933 – May 26, 2012) and Diane Dillon (née Sorber; born March 13, 1933) were American illustrators of children's books and adult paperback book and magazine covers. One obituary of Leo called the work of the husband-and-wife team "a seamless amalgam of both their hands". In more than 50 years, they created more than 100 speculative fiction book and magazine covers together as well as much interior artwork. Essentially all of their work in that field was joint.

The Dillons won the Caldecott Medal in 1976 and 1977, the only consecutive awards of the honor. Leo Dillon was the first Black artist to win the Caldecott Medal. In 1978 they were runners-up for the Hans Christian Andersen Award for children's illustrators; they were the U.S. nominee again in 1996.

== Biography ==
Leo Dillon, of Trinidadian immigrant parentage, was born March 2, 1933, and raised in East New York. He enlisted in the Navy for three years' service so that he could attend art school. He credited his interest in art and his inspiration to become an artist to his friend and mentor, Ralph Volman.

Diane Sorber was born March 13, 1933, in Glendale, California, 11 days after Dillon. Her interest in art was encouraged early by her mother, who was a pianist. The couple met at the Parsons School of Design in New York City in 1953 — where they "became instant archrivals and remained together from then on". They graduated in 1956 and married the next year. This union resulted in an artistic collaboration. Diane Dillon explained in an interview, “we could look at ourselves as one artist rather than two individuals, and that third artist was doing something neither one of us would do. We let it flow the way it flows when an artist is working by themselves and a color goes down that they didn’t quite expect and that affects the next colors they use, and it seems to have a life of its own.” Their work, which features racially diverse figures, was informed by their experiences as an interracial couple.

An association with writer Harlan Ellison led to jobs doing book covers for his short story collections and both cover and interior woodcut illustration for his anthology Dangerous Visions. They illustrated a large number of mass market paperback book covers for the original Ace Science Fiction Specials, for which they won their first major award, science fiction's 1971 Hugo Award for Best Professional Artist. A detailed biography and introduction to their work and styles were written by Byron Preiss in a book he edited in 1981, entitled The Art of Leo & Diane Dillon. They once described their work as incorporating motifs derived from their respective heritages. This can be demonstrated in their work for Margaret Musgrove's Ashanti to Zulu, which used tribal motifs and combined historical with contemporary styles.

On May 28, 2012, Ellison reported on his website his reception of a phone call from Diane announcing Leo's death at the age of 79 from lung cancer two days prior. Spectrum Fantastic Art, an annual art competition and art book project of which the couple were general managers, confirmed Leo's death on its website. The obituary of Leo in The New York Times praised the Dillons jointly as "one of the world's pre-eminent illustrators for young people, producing artwork — praised for its vibrancy, ecumenicalism and sheer sumptuous beauty — that was a seamless amalgam of both their hands", also noting the ethnoracial diversity of characters in the Dillons' work in the 1970s, "until then, the smiling faces portrayed in picture books had been overwhelmingly white."

Since Leo's death, Diane Dillon has illustrated one book, I Can Be Anything! Don’t Tell Me I Can’t (published 2018), which she also wrote.

The Dillon’s son Lee (Lionel John Dillon III), born 1965, became an artist and collaborated with his parents several times, including the illustrations for Pish, Posh, Said Hieronymus Bosch by Nancy Willard (1991). Both Leo and Diane lived in the Cobble Hill neighborhood at the time of Leo's death.

== Art collected ==
The Eaton Collection of Science Fiction & Fantasy acquired the Dillons' original cover art for The Left Hand of Darkness.

== Works ==
=== Picture books illustrated by Leo and Diane Dillon ===
- 1970 The Ring in the Prairie, written by John Bierhorst / Dial Press
- 1972 Honey, I Love, Eloise Greenfield / Viking
- 1973 Blast Off, Linda C. Cain and Susan Rosenbaum / Xerox
- 1974 Whirlwind Is a Ghost Dancing, compiled by Natalia Maree Belting / Dutton
- 1974 Songs and Stories from Uganda, W. Moses Serwadda, Hewitt Pantaleoni / World Music Press
- 1974 The Third Gift, Jan R. Carew / Little Brown
- 1975 The Hundred Penny Box, Sharon Bell Mathis / Viking
- 1975 Song of the Boat, Lorenz B. Graham / Crowell
- 1976 Why Mosquitoes Buzz in People's Ears, Verna Aardema / Dial Press
- 1977 Ashanti to Zulu: African Traditions, Margaret Musgrove / Dial Press
- 1977 Who's in Rabbit's House: A Masai Tale, Verna Aardema / Dial Press
- 1980 Two Pair of Shoes, P. L. Travers / Viking Press
- 1980 Children of the Sun, Jan R. Carew / Little Brown
- 1985 Brother to the Wind, Mildred Pitts Walter / Lothrop, Lee & Shepard Books
- 1986 All in a Day, Mitsumasa Anno and Raymond Briggs / Hamish Hamilton (London) (Translation of: Marui chikyū no maru ichinichi.) —illustrations by 10 artists, including the Dillons
- 1987 The Porcelain Cat, Michael Patrick Hearn / Little Brown
- 1989 The Color Wizard, Barbara Brenner / Bantam Little Rooster
- 1990 The Tale of the Mandarin Ducks, Katherine Paterson / Lodestar
- 1990 Aïda, Leontyne Price / Harcourt Brace Jovanovich
- 1991 The Race of the Golden Apples, Claire Martin / Dial Books for Young Readers
- 1991 Pish, Posh, Said Hieronymus Bosch, Nancy Willard / Harcourt Brace Jovanovich
- 1992 Northern Lullaby, Nancy White Carlstrom / Putnam
- 1992 Switch on the Night, Ray Bradbury / Knopf
- 1993 The Sorcerer's Apprentice, Nancy Willard / Scholastic/Blue Sky Press
- 1994 What Am I?, N. N. Charles / Scholastic/Blue Sky Press
- 1997 To Everything There is a Season, the Dillons / Scholastic/Blue Sky Press
- 1999 Wind Child, Shirley Rousseau Murphy / HarperCollins
- 2000 Switch on the Night, Ray Bradbury / Knopf (reissue)
- 2000 The Girl Who Spun Gold, Virginia Hamilton / Scholastic/Blue Sky Press
- 2001 Two Little Trains, Margaret Wise Brown / HarperCollins
- 2002 Rap a Tap Tap: Here's Bojangles—Think of That, written and illustrated by the Dillons / Scholastic/Blue Sky Press
- 2003 One Winter's Night, John Herman / Philomel
- 2004 Where Have You Been?, Margaret Wise Brown / HarperCollins
- 2005 The People Could Fly - The Picture Book
- 2005 Earth Mother, Ellen B. Jackson / Walker & Company
- 2006 Whirlwind is a Spirit Dancing, Natalia Maree Belting and Joseph Bruchac / Milk & Cookies Press —illustrations reprinted from 1974 title, Whirlwind is a Ghost Dancing
- 2007 Mother Goose numbers on the loose / Harcourt
- 2007 Jazz on a Saturday Night / Blue Sky Press
- 2009 The Goblin and the Empty Chair / Viking Australia
- 2009 Mama Says: A Book of Love for Mothers and Sons
- 2011 The Secret River, Marjorie Kinnan Rawlings / Atheneum Books for Young Readers (reissue) (Note: The Dillons created cover illustrations for many books that were not first editions. By policy the cover images and cover illustrations displayed in Wikipedia book articles should be from the first editions but that is not always true. They should have captions but that is not always true.)

=== Picture books illustrated only by Diane Dillon ===
- 2018 I Can Be Anything! Don’t Tell Me I Can’t

=== Chapter books illustrated by Leo and Diane Dillon ===
- 1962 Mother Night, Kurt Vonnegut, Jr / Fawcett Publications/Gold Medal Books
- 1964 The Sea and the Jungle, H. M. Tomlinson / Time / Time Reading Program Special Edition
- 1964 Hakon of Rogen's Saga, Erik Christian Haugaard / Houghton Mifflin
- 1965 A Slave's Tale Haugaard, Erik Christian Haugaard / Houghton Mifflin
- 1966 The Witches of Karres, James H. Schmitz / Ace Science Fiction Special
- 1967 Claymore and Kilt, Sorche Nic Leodhas / Holt, Rinehart, Winston
- 1968 Shamrock and Spear Pilkington / Holt, Rinehart, Winston
- 1968 The Rider and His Horse, Erik Christian Haugaard / Houghton Mifflin
- 1969 The Preserving Machine, Philip K. Dick / Ace Books
- 1969 The Left Hand of Darkness, Ursula K. Le Guin / Ace Books
- 1971 The Untold Tale, Erik Christian Haugaard / Houghton Mifflin
- 1971 Scholastic Black Literature Series: The Searcheditors Alma Murray / Robert Thomas / Scholastic
- 1974 Burning Star, Eth Clifford / Houghton Mifflin
- 1977 The Planets / Time Life Books
- 1979 A Wrinkle In Time, Madeleine L'Engle / (reissue)
- 1984 The Enchanted World: Legends of Valor / Time Life Books
- 1985 The People Could Fly: American Black Folktales, Virginia Hamilton / Knopf
- 1985 The Enchanted World: Magical Beasts / Time Life Books
- 1987 Wise Child, Monica Furlong / Knopf
- 1988 Sing A Song of Popcorn: Every Child's Book of Poems Beatrice Schenk de Regniers / Scholastic — illustrated by many artists
- 1989 Moses' Ark, Alice Bach and J. Cheryl Exum / Delacorte Press
- 1991 Juniper, Monica Furlong / Random House
- 1991 Miriam's Well, Bach and Exum / Delacorte Press
- 1992 Many Thousand Gone, Virginia Hamilton / Knopf
- 1993 It's Kwaanza Time, Linda Goss, Clay Goss/ Putnam Publishing
- 1995 Her Stories, Virginia Hamilton / Scholastic / Blue Sky Press
- 1995 Sabriel, Garth Nix / HarperCollins
- 1997 The Girl Who Dreamed Only Geese, Howard A. Norman / Harcourt Brace & Co
- 2000 20,000 Leagues Under the Sea, Jules Verne / HarperCollins (reissue)
- 2001 Mansa Musa, Khephra Burns / Harcourt Brace & Co
- 2001 Lirael, Garth Nix / HarperCollins
- 2003 Abhorsen, Garth Nix / HarperCollins
- 2004 Between Heaven and Earth: Bird Tales From Around The World, Howard A. Norman / Harcourt Brace & Co
- 2004 Colman, Monica Furlong / Random House

== Awards ==
- 1971 Hugo Award for Best Professional Artist
- 1971 Locus Award for Best Paperback Cover Illustrator
- 1976 Caldecott Medal – Why Mosquitoes Buzz In People's Ears, written by Verna Aardema
- 1977 Caldecott Medal – Ashanti To Zulu: African Traditions, written by Margaret Musgrove
- 1977 Hamilton King Award – Society Of Illustrators
- 1978 Highly Commended runner-up as a duo, Hans Christian Andersen Award (body of work, children's book illustration)
- 1982 Balrog Award For Lifetime Contribution To Science Fiction/Fantasy
- 1982 Art Ninth Annual Lensman Award
- 1986 Coretta Scott King Illustrator Honor – The People Could Fly, written by Virginia Hamilton
- 1988 Third Annual Keene State College Children's Literature Festival Award
- 1991 Doctorate Of Fine Art Degree – Parsons School Of Design
- 1991 Coretta Scott King Illustrator Award – Aida, written by Leontyne Price
- 1992 Empire State Award For Children's And Adult Literature – Body of Work
- 1992 Society Of Illustrators Gold Medal For Northern Lullaby From The Original Art Show Of Children's Picture Books
- 1996 U.S. nominee as a duo, Hans Christian Andersen Award (body of work, children's book illustration)
- 1996 Coretta Scott King Illustrator Honor – Her Stories, written by Virginia Hamilton
- 1997 Chesley Award For Best Science Fiction Hardcover – Sabriel, written by Garth Nix
- 1997 The Grand Masters Award – For Body Of Work
- 1997 Society of Illustrators Hall Of Fame
- 2002 Virginia Hamilton Literary Award – For Body Of Work
- 2003 Coretta Scott King Illustrator Honor – Rap A Tap Tap Here's Bojangles–Think Of That
- 2005 Coretta Scott King Illustrator Honor – The People Could Fly: The Picture Book, written by Virginia Hamilton
- 2006 Knickerbocker Award – For Body Of Work
- 2006 Doctorate Of Fine Arts – Montserrat School Of Art
- 2008 World Fantasy Convention Life Achievement Award
- 2008 Coretta Scott King Illustrator Honor – Jazz On A Saturday Night
- 2012 BolognaRagazzi Award – Fiction Honorable Mention – The Secret River
