= Ashanti to Zulu =

Children's book from 1976

Ashanti to Zulu: African Traditions
- Front cover
- Author: Margaret Musgrove
- Illustrator: Leo and Diane Dillon
- Cover artist: Dillon
- Genre: Children's picture book
- Publisher: Dial Books
- Publication date: 1976
- Publication place: United States
- ISBN: 0-8037-0357-0
- OCLC: 2726240
- Dewey Decimal: 960
- LC Class: GN645 .M87

Ashanti to Zulu: African Traditions is a 1976 children's book written by Margaret Musgrove and illustrated by Leo and Diane Dillon. It was Musgrove's first book, but the Dillons were experienced artists and this book won them the second of their two consecutive Caldecott Medals. (The first was for Why Mosquitoes Buzz in People's Ears: A West African Tale.)

The book features twenty-six illustrations of native African peoples, each accompanied by a short vignette describing one of the customs of that particular people.

Peoples included in the book:

- Ashanti
- Baule
- Chagga
- Dogon
- Ewe
- Fanti
- Ga
- Hausa
- Ikoma
- Jie
- Kung
- Lozi
- Masai
- Ndaka
- Ouadai
- Pondo
- Quimbande
- Rendille
- Sotho
- Tuareg
- Uge
- Vai
- Wagenia
- Xhosa
- Yoruba
- Zulu

Awards
Preceded by Why Mosquitoes Buzz in People's Ears	Caldecott Medal recipient 1977	Succeeded by Noah's Ark
