= The Goblin and the Empty Chair =

Children's picture book by Mem Fox

- Author: Mem Fox
- Illustrator: Leo and Diane Dillon
- Cover artist: The Dillons
- Language: English
- Genre: Children's picture book
- Published: 2009 (Viking Australia)
- Publication place: Australia
- Media type: Print (hardback)
- Pages: 32 (unpaginated)
- ISBN: 9780670074211
- OCLC: 808380354

The Goblin and the Empty Chair is a 2009 children's picture book by Mem Fox and illustrated by Leo and Diane Dillon. It is a modern fairy tale, and is about a hermit goblin who observes a farming family that is so aggrieved (possibly due to the loss of a child) that they cannot carry out their daily tasks. For three days the goblin secretly does their work, not realising that he has been seen. Eventually the goblin is invited to have breakfast with them.

== Publication history ==
- 2009, USA, Beach Lane Books ISBN 9781416985853
- 2009, Australia, Viking Australia ISBN 9780670074211

== Reception ==
Reviews of The Goblin and the Empty Chair have been favourable with Publishers Weekly writing: "Acceptance and healing are less common picture book themes; Fox (Time for Bed) handles them with particular grace". Kirkus Reviews called it a perfect combination of words and images.

The Goblin and the Empty Chair has also been reviewed by Booklist, School Library Journal, Horn Book Guides, Library Media Connection, The Bulletin of the Center for Children's Books, Magpies, and Reading Time.
