= Why Mosquitoes Buzz in People's Ears =

1975 picture book

- Author: Verna Aardema
- Illustrator: Leo and Diane Dillon
- Cover artist: Dillons
- Genre: Children's picture book
- Publisher: Dial Books for Young Readers
- Publication date: 1975
- Publication place: United States
- ISBN: 0-8037-6089-2
- OCLC: 1094805
- Dewey Decimal: [398.2] E
- LC Class: PZ8.1.A213 Wh

Why Mosquitoes Buzz in People's Ears: A West African Tale is a 1975 children's picture book by Verna Aardema and illustrated by Leo and Diane Dillon. Published in hardcover by Dial Books for Young Readers it is told in the form of a cumulative tale written for young children, which tells an African legend.

== Plot ==
In this origin story, the mosquito lies to an iguana, who puts sticks in his ears and ends up frightening a python, which down a long line causes a panic. In the end, an owlet is inadvertently killed and the owl is too sad to wake the sun until the animals hold court and find out who is responsible. The mosquito is eventually found out, but she hides in order to escape punishment. So now she constantly buzzes in the human ears to find out if everyone is still angry at her.

== About the art ==
The artwork was made using watercolor airbrush, pastels, and India ink. The cutout shapes were made by using friskets and vellum cut shapes at different angles.

== Reception ==
The book won a Caldecott Medal in 1976 for the Dillons. It was the first of their two consecutive Caldecott wins; the second was for Ashanti to Zulu: African Traditions.

== Cause and effect ==
This story is a resource for teachers to teach the skill cause and effect: "A cause is something that makes something else happen; An effect is what happens as a result of the cause"

The idea that the mosquito is to blame for the unfortunate death of the owlet is an example of cause and effect. The actions from the other animals also offers several more examples of cause and effect as each animal does something that causes the next animal to do something. This chain of events finally causes the owlet to die. Teachers can use this text to show students how actions (causes) make other things happen (effect).

== In other media ==
The book was adapted into an animated short by Gene Deitch for Weston Woods Studios in 1984, narrated by James Earl Jones.

Awards
Preceded by Arrow to the Sun	Caldecott Medal recipient 1976	Succeeded by Ashanti to Zulu
