= Her Stories =

1995 collection of stories

Her Stories: African American Folktales, Fairy Tales, and True Tales
- First edition
- Author: Virginia Hamilton
- Illustrator: Leo and Diane Dillon
- Language: English
- Subject: Children's literature, Slavery in the United States, Folklore
- Published: 1995
- Publisher: Blue Sky Press, an imprint of Scholastic
- Publication place: United States
- Media type: Print (hardback)
- Pages: 112
- Awards: 1996 Coretta Scott King Author Award
- ISBN: 9780590473705
- OCLC: 778975720

Her Stories: African American Folktales, Fairy Tales, and True Tales is a 1995 collection of nineteen stories by Black women, retold by Virginia Hamilton and illustrated by Leo and Diane Dillon. They include animal tales, fairy tales (including a version of Cinderella, "Catskinella"), and three biographical profiles of real Black women. All the stories feature comments on their sources from Hamilton.

== Publication history ==
- 1995, The Blue Sky Press, ISBN 9780590473705, hardback

== Reception ==
A review by The Manhattan Mercury called Her Stories "an uplifting book to enjoy and savor for the color and verve of both its language and pictures," drawing particular attention to Leo and Diane Dillons' "stunning and graceful illustrations."

The Des Moines Register praised the collection of tales, noting that they all "vibrate with story-teller spirit" and are "all of a length for perfect bedtime reading."

== Awards ==
Her Stories has received two awards:

- 1995 Laura Ingalls Wilder Award winner
- 1996 Coretta Scott King Award author winner
