= Verna Aardema =

American children's writer (1911–2000)

- Born: Verna Norberg; June 6, 1911; New Era, Michigan, U.S.
- Died: May 11, 2000 (aged 88); Chapel Hill, North Carolina, U.S.
- Education: Michigan State University
- Occupation: Writer
- Writing career
- Genre: Children's literature
- Notable works: Why Mosquitoes Buzz in People's Ears; Bringing the Rain to Kapiti Plain; Who's in Rabbit's House?

Verna Norberg Aardema Vugteveen (June 6, 1911 – May 11, 2000), best known by the name Verna Aardema, was an American writer of children's books.

Aardema graduated from Michigan State University in 1934 with a Bachelor of Arts degree in journalism. She started writing children's stories because her daughter would only eat if she was read a story, so this led her to start writing "feeding" stories. Aardema frequently read about Africa, so her stories would often times incorporate this by being set in African regions like the Kalahari and Ashantiland. In 1960, she published her first set of stories, Tales from the Story Hat, which were very successful, and so she continued to adapt traditional tales and folklore from distant cultures, (usually from Africa and Mexico) to expose young children to the vast variety of human expression.

Her book, Why Mosquitoes Buzz in People's Ears (1975), illustrated by Leo and Diane Dillon, received the Caldecott Medal in 1976 and the Brooklyn Art Books for Children Award in 1977. Who's in Rabbit's House? 1977 was the 1977 School Library Journal Best Book of the Year and a Lewis Carroll Shelf Award winner in 1978. Aardema received the Children's Reading Round Table Award in 1981, and several of her works have been selected as Notable Books by the American Library Association. Her Oh Kojo! How Could You! won the 1984 Parents' Choice Award for Literature.

== Sources ==
- Verna Aardema Bibliography from James Madison University
- Contemporary Authors, New Revision Series, vol. 18, pp. 471–472.
- Fifth Book of Junior Authors and Illustrators, 1983, pp. 1–2.
