= Jazz on a Saturday Night =

2007 picture book by Leo and Diane Dillon

Jazz on a Saturday Night is a 2007 children's picture book by American writers Leo and Diane Dillon published by The Blue Sky Press.

== Synopsis ==
A crowd gathers in a concert hall on a Saturday night, ready to hear live Jazz after a work week. Famous musicians gather and perform for the audience, including Miles Davis, Max Roach, Charlie Parker, John Coltrane, Thelonious Monk, Stanley Clark, Ella Fitzgerald. These musicians combine melodies using trumpet, saxophone, piano, vocals, bass, guitar, and drums. As the concert concludes, each member of the audience files out, inspired by the music they heard. While these musicians never played together historically, they all were famous and talented performers.

== Background ==
The authors and illustrators of this book, Lee and Diane Dillon, frequently listen to jazz and use it as inspiration for their work.

== Reception ==
This book was received very well by many professional book review companies. One such was Kirkus, which praised the illustrations, stating, "...the authors paint stylized, affectionate portraits of eight artists...". Scholastic referred to the book as "pure magic". It received the Coretta Scott King Award honor for illustrator in 2008.
