= Noah's Ark (Spier book) =

1977 picture book by Peter Spier

- Front cover of unknown edition
- Author: Peter Spier
- Illustrator: Peter Spier
- Cover artist: Peter Spier
- Language: English
- Genre: Children's picture book
- Publisher: Doubleday
- Publication date: 1977
- Publication place: United States
- Media type: Print (hardback & paperback)
- Pages: 46 pp
- ISBN: 0-385-12730-8
- OCLC: 2524624
- Dewey Decimal: 222/.1109505
- LC Class: BS1238.N6 S64

Noah's Ark is a children's picture book written and illustrated by Peter Spier, first published by Doubleday in 1977. The text includes Spier's translation of "The Flood" by Jacobus Revius, a 17th-century poem telling the Bible story of Noah's Ark. According to Kirkus Reviews, the poem comprises sixty three-syllable lines such as "Pair by pair" (in translation). "Without revising or even enlarging on the old story, Spier fills it in, delightfully." In a retrospective essay about the Caldecott Medal-winning books from 1976 to 1985, Barbara Bader described the book as "at once elaborate and feeble" and Revius' poem as "neither particularly suited to children nor eloquent in itself."

For Noah's Ark Spier won the 1978 Caldecott Medal for illustration and the 1982 National Book Award for Children's Books in category Picture Books (paperback). (Note: Picture books were separately recognized for only two years in National Book Awards history, paperbacks for four years. Most of the paperback award-winners were reprints.)

== Notes ==
Awards
Preceded by Ashanti to Zulu: African Traditions	Caldecott Medal recipient 1978	Succeeded by The Girl Who Loved Wild Horses
