= Sabriel =

1995 fantasy novel by Garth Nix

- First edition
- Author: Garth Nix
- Audio read by: Tim Curry
- Cover artist: Gregory Rogers
- Language: English
- Series: The Old Kingdom
- Genre: Fantasy novel
- Publisher: HarperCollins Publishers
- Publication date: 1995
- Publication place: Australia
- Media type: Print (Hardcover & Paperback) and (audio-CD & e-book)
- Pages: 491
- ISBN: 0-06-447183-7 (Paperback edition)
- OCLC: 37767063
- Preceded by: Clariel: The Lost Abhorsen
- Followed by: Lirael

Sabriel is a fantasy novel by Garth Nix, first published in 1995. It is the first in his Old Kingdom series, followed by Lirael, Abhorsen, Clariel, Goldenhand, and Terciel and Elinor.

== Plot introduction ==
The novel is set in two neighbouring fictional countries divided by an ancient Wall: To the south lies Ancelstierre, which has a technology level and society similar to that of the early-20th century United Kingdom. To the north lies the Old Kingdom, which is akin to medieval Europe.

=== Magic ===
In the Old Kingdom, two oppositional forms of magic exist: Free Magic, which is malevolent, and Charter Magic, which is benevolent. The existence of magic is officially denied by the government of Ancelstierre, and disbelieved by most of Ancelstierre's inhabitants.

The Charter is a vast, interconnected web of magical symbols called Charter marks. It was established by an ancient group known as the Founders to impose order on the older, wilder Free magic, and to bind both Free Magic elementals and reanimated, undead beings known as the Dead.

Those who can wield Charter magic are called Charter mages, and can be identified by a mark on their forehead that becomes visible when a spell is cast to reveal it. Those with Old Kingdom heritage are more likely to be Charter mages, although some Ancelstierran citizens born close to the border are known to be Charter mages, and some Ancelstierran schools close to the Wall teach a Charter magic curriculum.

To be proficient in Charter Magic, the mage must have both innate aptitude and adequate training. Different Charter marks have different functions, and Charter mages may draw, speak, visualize, or even hum or whistle specific Charter marks and spells, so each mage's skill and knowledge determines what magic they are capable of.

Charter Magic is concentrated most strongly at Charter Stones, standing stones inscribed with Charter marks that are scattered across the Old Kingdom to act as physical anchors. Charter Stones can be broken with sacrificial blood, and being near a broken Charter Stone results in less powerful Charter Magic. Being in the vicinity of a broken Charter Stone, or a large amount of Free Magic, also causes great physical and mental distress, including chills, nausea, vomiting, and feelings of anxiety and foreboding.

=== The Wall ===
The ancient, magical Wall that divides the two countries was built to keep the Old Kingdom's dangers, such as the Dead and Free Magic creatures, from spilling into Ancelstierre, although its practical effectiveness is limited, since the Dead can pass the Wall when the Free Magic controlling them is strong enough. The Wall is around forty feet high, inscribed with Charter marks, and, despite its age, never seems to fall into disrepair.

Although the government denies the existence of magic, Ancelstierre treats the Wall as a frontier to be watched, and maintains a garrison of soldiers there. The garrison monitors and combats hostile Free Magic beings and the effects of Free Magic that cross the Wall, patrols the area of the Old Kingdom directly bordering the Wall, and manages a gate crossing point for travelers who are approved to go between the two countries.

The Wall acts as a magical barrier as well. Ancelstierran machines like cars, guns, and electric lighting become more unreliable the closer they are to the Wall, and fail completely in the Old Kingdom. As such, Ancelstierran soldiers stationed at the garrison are equipped with swords, bayonets, shields, bows, and sometimes armor. The effects of the Old Kingdom's magic sometimes can be felt and seen on the Ancelstierran side of the Wall on days when the wind blows particularly strong from the north.

The Wall also affects the weather in both countries. Someone crossing the Wall on a crisp, sunny autumn day in Ancelstierre might find themselves in a winter snow storm upon entering the Old Kingdom. An almanac charting the different weather conditions in both countries is a helpful tool, and travelers must be properly outfitted before crossing to ensure survival.

=== Necromancy and the Dead ===
In the Old Kingdom, Free Magic necromancers are capable of raising and reanimating the Dead, ranging from weak, zombie-like Hands to powerful beings known as the Greater Dead.

Most Dead creatures are unable to pass over or under deep or swift-running water, and cannot stand sunlight, limiting their movement and activity to underground areas where the sun is weak, or during night or particularly bad weather. Necromancers or very strong Dead beings may sometimes enslave or recruit living persons to carry out work that can only be done near water or in the daylight. The strongest Dead beings can sometimes manipulate the weather, such as calling thick fog, to give themselves an advantage or more freedom to travel.

To remedy the problem the Dead pose to the living, a Charter Magic necromancer under the title of Abhorsen invokes Charter Magic using a bandolier of bells, each of which can be used to control the Dead in different ways, and a sword to kill them a final time. At the time of Sabriel, the Abhorsen is Sabriel's father, Terciel. The Abhorsen title passes within a family line, with each Abhorsen taking an apprentice to eventually succeed them.

=== Death ===
In Sabriel, Death is a river realm the dead pass through, which necromancers, including the Abhorsen, can enter and leave with the use of magic.

Death consists of nine precincts, each separated from the next by a gate, where the river drops over a precipice or falls into the next precinct. The current gets stronger as a necromancer travels from the First Precinct, which is closest to life, towards the Ninth Gate, which leads to final death and no return. Each precinct has its own characteristics and tricks that necromancers must learn and remember or risk being taken by Death themselves. For example, the Second Precinct should be traversed cautiously to avoid holes and strong currents. While the Third Precinct initially looks calm in comparison to the previous one, it generates massive waves that cannot be avoided, requiring the necromancer to abandon caution and sprint for the gate to the Fourth Precinct, lest they be swept away.

When a necromancer's spirit is in Death, their physical body is immobile and often encased in a thin layer of ice, indicative of the river's cold temperature. Entering Death without magic or physical protection leaves a necromancer vulnerable. The longer a necromancer stays in Death, the more difficult it is to return to their physical body, and the further they travel towards the Ninth Gate, the stronger and more dangerous the River becomes.

When an Abhorsen banishes a Dead being, its strength determines its fate. Weaker beings are often quickly swept up and carried past the Ninth Gate into final death, but stronger Dead beings and Free Magic necromancers may use their power to stop themselves in one of the nine precincts, where they may remain and use other Dead beings to do their will, or they may begin to work their way back through the precincts towards life. Particularly strong necromancers and Dead beings can thus be banished for a time before eventually becoming a threat once more.

=== Old Kingdom history ===
The Old Kingdom's royal family was historically charged with preserving the Charter. However, two hundred years before the start of Sabriel, the entire royal family was seemingly killed. Without the royal line to help maintain the Charter, the integrity of Charter Magic has declined significantly, and only the Abhorsen remains to combat Free Magic necromancers and the Dead.

In addition to the failing Charter Magic, the country has been without a regent for twenty years, leading to decaying infrastructure, abandoned settlements, and increased Free Magic and Dead activity.

== Plot summary ==
In the book's prologue, a mysterious woman has died after stumbling into a traveler's camp and giving birth there. The camp's midwife checks over the baby and pronounces her dead as well, but the Abhorsen enters the camp and declares that the baby still lives. The camp's Charter Mage performs a baptism, which is accepted, causing a Charter mark to appear on the baby's forehead, and Abhorsen enters Death to retrieve her spirit.

He finds her in the First Precinct, having been found and caught by Kerrigor, a Dead being that the Abhorsen had previously banished beyond the Seventh Gate. Kerrigor has since made his way back to the First Precinct by using the life force of a necromancer. The baby awakens while Kerrigor is holding her, and the strength of her life force, protected by her baptismal Charter mark, causes him to drop her. Abhorsen catches her and banishes Kerrigor, who vows revenge, then returns to Life with her, declaring himself to be her father and naming her Sabriel.

Eighteen years later, Sabriel is a prefect in her final term at Wyverley College, an all-female boarding school in Ancelstierre, not far from the Wall. She has been at Wyverley since she was five years old, having been sent there by her father for an education and to keep her safe from his enemies in the Old Kingdom. She is a strong student, but particularly excels at Charter Magic and the fighting arts. Although she only sees her father in person twice a year, he is able to visit her every full moon as a magical "sending," and he trains her to be his successor.

Three weeks before the end of term, her father's sending fails to appear at the November full moon, and Sabriel is summoned to help when a Dead creature enters one of the student dormitories. However, she notices it is holding a sack and enters Death to investigate. There, her use of Charter Magic startles the creature, causing it to drop the sack. As it searches the river for the sack, it loses its footing and is swept away, but not before her father's voice tells her to retrieve the sack. Sabriel realizes that if her father sent the messenger, he is either dead or trapped in Death. The sack is revealed to contain the Abhorsen's sword and bandolier of bells.

Determined to learn what has happened to her father and rescue him if possible, Sabriel leaves Wyverley and travels to the Wall to enter the Old Kingdom with the goal of reaching Abhorsen's House, the home of her father. At the Wall, she meets Colonel Horyse, the commander of the Northern Perimeter Reconnaissance Unit, which is a small group of soldiers who have a Charter mark and some basic knowledge of Charter Magic. Horyse gives her a map of the Old Kingdom and after she shows her passports for both Ancelstierre and the Old Kingdom, Sabriel is allowed to cross.

As she embarks on her journey, Sabriel comes across the remains of an ambushed Ancelstierran patrol and discovers a broken Charter Stone. She enters Death to call on a magical "sending," which she believes to be a remnant of her mother's spirit, for directions to Abhorsen's House, and fights a Dead creature named Thralk, who vows to tell "the servants of Kerrigor" about her. Making her way to Abhorsen's House, Sabriel becomes aware that she is being stalked by a Mordicant, a powerful Dead creature. She is barely able to outrun the creature and reach the safety of house, which is located on an island in a deep, fast-moving river the Dead cannot cross.

At Abhorsen's House, Sabriel is able to rest, although she is dismayed to find that her father is not there. As she recovers from her exhaustion, she is cared for by servant sendings, which bathe, clothe, and feed her. She also meets Mogget, a Free Magic construct who has been bound in service to the Abhorsen bloodline for millennia. He takes the form of a small white cat, wearing a collar inscribed with a powerful binding spell and a miniature Saraneth hanging from it. During dinner, Sabriel can feel her father's presence and declares that even though his spirit is trapped in Death, he is technically not dead, and that she will continue to search for him.

Mogget reveals that three weeks prior, a messenger came to the house and begged the Abhorsen to help banish Dead creatures preying on the people of Belisaere, the capital city of the Old Kingdom. In the house's observatory, Sabriel discovers the Mordicant overseeing a group of living human slaves as they build a bridge of grave dirt, which would allow the Dead to cross the river and reach her. Knowing she must delay them so she can finish preparations, Sabriel performs a ritual calling upon the clairvoyant Clayr to summon a flood of water. She and Mogget depart from the house in a Paperwing, a magically propelled plane-like structure made out of laminated paper by a previous Abhorsen. Before they take off, Mogget coughs up a silver ring. He evades Sabriel's questions about what it is, stating only that it is old and that she will know when to use it.

While in the air, Sabriel and Mogget are attacked by gore crows. Sabriel uses whistled Charter Magic to control the wind, allowing the Paperwing to outpace their pursuers, but the strong winds cause her to lose control of the aircraft. Sabriel loosens Mogget's collar to avoid a fatal crash. They land in a sinkhole, where Mogget, in its unbound, Free Magic form, attempts to murder Sabriel in retaliation for the millennia it has spent in servitude to the Abhorsen bloodline. However, she is able to bind it anew with Saraneth and the ring Mogget gave her before their departure from Abhorsen's House. Mogget returns to cat form and coughs up another ring, which Sabriel puts on her finger.

The next day, Sabriel and Mogget walk through a tunnel to another sinkhole, which Mogget determines to be Holehallow, the historical burial place of the Royal Family. Sabriel discovers that the figurehead on one of the funerary boats is not a wooden carving but an actual man who has been imprisoned in that form. She crosses into Death to retrieve his spirit and succeeds, but in doing so alerts a powerful Dead creature. The man thanks Sabriel and promptly falls asleep. The next day, he asks Sabriel to call him Touchstone. He tells Sabriel that he has been imprisoned for two hundred years. Prior to that, Touchstone was a royal guard, and he remembers an attack on the Queen, but a spell prevents him from revealing more than that.

The three continue their journey, stopping to help rid a seaside village of a Dead creature. Pursued by the Mordicant, they obtain a boat there and sail up the coast of the Old Kingdom, heading for Belisaere. While they sail, they find that being on the sea temporarily lifts the spell preventing them from talking about the Charter, and Touchstone recounts his last memories before waking up in Holehallow with Sabriel and Mogget.

Two hundred years ago, Kerrigor was known as Rogirek, or Rogir. The oldest son of the Old Kingdom's Queen, he was a prince and a childhood friend of Touchstone, who gave him the nickname Kerrigor. Over the years, the two grew apart; Touchstone joined the royal guard, and Rogir traveled for years at a time to further his studies, becoming more strange for it. After an absence of many years, Rogir came to visit for Midwinter, acting like his old self, which relieved Touchstone. During this visit, the Queen and her ladies-in-waiting were playing a lawn game when Rogir asked the queen to come with him to investigate an issue with the Charter Stones in an underground reservoir. The Queen, a Charter Mage who detected nothing wrong, initially declined, but Touchstone, who was on guard duty at the time, convinced her to go.

By this time, Rogir, who had been secretly studying Free Magic for many years, was already one of the Dead, possibly having killed himself to attain immortality as one of the Greater Dead, and was using a Free Magic construct at his physical body. In the reservoir, Rogir's Free Magic minions sacrificed the Queen's daughters, using their blood to break two of the Charter Stones. Rogir himself cut the Queen's throat and caught her blood in a ceremonial cup, intending to use it to break another Stone. In a berserk rage, Touchstone fought the other guards who were in league with Rogir. Before Rogir could use his mother's blood to break another Stone, the then-Abhorsen arrived with an unbound Mogget and a host of the royal guard. The Abhorsen banished Kerrigor into Death, and to help Touchstone, who had been driven insane by what happened in the reservoir, preserved his spirit in Death and turned his living body into the figurehead.

As they get closer to land, Mogget reveals Kerrigor's motives. In order to walk in Life as one of the Dead, he had to continuously take lives, which was made difficult by the protection of the Charter. Thus, he decided to break it, and rather than break smaller Charter Stones, which would limit his range and certainly force a conflict with the Abhorsen, he focused on breaking the Great Charter Stones in the reservoir. Although he could have used the blood of the Abhorsen or the Clayr, obtaining the royal blood of his own family was easier. While the then-Abhorsen delayed his plans, Kerrigor's body has never been found, and must be destroyed if there is to be any chance of sending him to his final death.

Entering Belisaere, the travelers find that most of the city has been taken over by the Dead, save one area that is surrounded by aqueducts the Dead cannot pass under. They rent rooms at an inn to rest, recuperate, and plot their next steps. Sabriel hypothesizes that Kerrigor or his servants lured her father to the reservoir so his blood could be used to break another Charter Stone, and that they will find him there.

The following day, they leave the safety of the aqueducts. Passing through the abandoned section of the city and the charred remains of the royal palace, they enter the reservoir and find Abhorsen's body in a diamond of protection, his spirit trapped in Death. The broken Charter Stones make it difficult to use Charter Magic, but Sabriel and Touchstone work together to cast a second diamond of protection. Despite knowing they are likely walking into a trap, Sabriel has no choice but to enter Death while Touchstone and Mogget keep watch in Life.

Sabriel finds her father trapped in the Fourth Gate. He summons another Dead mouthpiece and instructs her to ring Mosrael and Kibeth simultaneously to free him. Since he has stayed too long in Death, he cannot return to Life for long. As they travel back through the precincts, Sabriel's father reveals that Touchstone is the last surviving royal prince, the bastard son of the last Queen and a nobleman she took up with after her consort died, making him Kerrigor's half-brother. They realize that Kerrigor and his Mordicant have arrived in the reservoir. Her father takes Abhorsen's sword and the bell Astarael, revealing his plan to send Kerrigor—and himself—into Death, and instructing Sabriel to flee with Touchstone. In Life, Sabriel last sees her father approaching Kerrigor, a freed Mogget on his shoulder. Touchstone almost dies from hearing Astarael, but Sabriel kisses him roughly to keep him alive.

Sabriel and Touchstone meet the Clayr twins Sanar and Ryelle, who show them a vision of Kerrigor's body in a sarcophagus buried in a cairn in Ancelstierre. They use another Paperwing to bring them as close to the Wall as possible, and are met by Colonel Horyse and his soldiers. They agree to help Sabriel find and destroy Kerrigor's body. During their preparations, Touchstone and Sabriel state their love for one another. Despite the combined Charter Magic of Sabriel, Touchstone, Horyse, and his soldiers, they need more Charter Mages to open the sarcophagus. They decide to take the sarcophagus to nearby Wyverley College, where Sabriel recruits the school's magic teacher, Magistrix Greenwood, and the oldest students in the Magic class.

Working together, they open the sarcophagus, but Kerrigor and his Dead minions arrive and attack the school before his body can be destroyed. Many soldiers and Wyverley staff and students die in the battle, including Colonel Horyse, the Magistrix, and Sabriel's friend Ellimere. Mogget, still in its Free Magic form after being unbound in the reservoir, arrives as well. It delivers Abhorsen's sword and the bell Astarael to Sabriel, stating that this act is the last part of its bargain with Sabriel's father and that it is now free to take his revenge on her. Kerrigor intervenes, wanting Sabriel's blood to break the Charter Stones in the reservoir, and the two creatures fight.

Kerrigor appears to consume Mogget. Sabriel uses Saraneth and Kibeth to force Kerrigor into his original body, then stabs him with her sword. Kerrigor appears unharmed, but as he taunts Sabriel, she realizes that the ring Mogget coughed up after she bound him in Holehallow is expanding, responding to Mogget's presence consumed by Kerrigor. Sabriel succeeds in placing the ring over Kerrigor, binding him, but he fatally stabs her with her own sword. Before she dies, Sabriel rings Ranna, and two cats emerge from the remains of Kerrigor's body: Kerrigor black, and Mogget his usual white.

Sabriel accepts her death, allowing the river of Death to carry her towards the Ninth Gate, but the spirits of previous Abhorsens stop her, saying she cannot die without someone else to take her place as Abhorsen. Before she returns to life, her father's spirit touches her hand. She wakes up with Touchstone before her, and both Mogget and Kerrigor asleep in their cat forms.

== Important characters and magical entities ==
=== The Bloodlines ===
Thousands of years ago, seven of the Nine Bright Shiners sacrificed their powers to create the Charter: a combination of powerful objects (the Great Stones and the Wall) and three magic blood lines, known as the Abhorsen, the Clayr, and the Royal Family. Five of the Seven completely lost themselves (one in each object or blood line) while two remained somewhat independent. One invested his/her power in the Royal bloodline, one in the Abhorsen's and one in the Clayr's (which is why the Clayr greet Sabriel as "cousin"). The remaining two, known as the "Wallmakers" invested themselves in several objects of power, including the Stones and Wall, then disappeared. These artifacts, the Charter Stones, are sources of the web of Charter magic that maintains peace and order over the kingdom. The Bloodlines all have a higher concentration of strong Charter mages than the general populace.

==== The Abhorsens ====
One of the most respected figures in the Old Kingdom, the Abhorsen uses both the dangerous Free Magic-based powers of a necromancer and the benevolent magic of the Charter to keep the gates of Death against the return of Dead spirits back into Life.

Sabriel and her father are members of the Abhorsen family. They use the bells, named after the seven bright shiners that established the Old Kingdom, in tandem with their natural affinity with Death, granted by their ancestor bright shiner, to amplify their powers.

The bells, smallest to largest, are:

- Ranna, "the Sleeper": Puts the listener to sleep, and is often used to quiet the Dead.
- Mosrael, "the Waker": Wakes the Dead and draws them back out of Death. Throws the necromancer farther into Death.
- Kibeth, "the Walker": Gives the Dead the ability to move, and can compel them to walk. May cause the ringer to walk further into Death if not careful.
- Dyrim, "the Speaker": Gives the Dead the ability to speak, or takes it away.
- Belgaer, "the Thinker": Restores a Dead being's thought and memory, but can erase them in a careless hand.
- Saraneth, "the Binder": Binds a Dead spirit to the ringer's will. Thought to be the original Abhorsen, and the bright shiner who invested her powers in the Abhorsen bloodline. Her gift is "binding", just as the Abhorsen's job is to "bind" the dead to Death.
- Astarael, "the Sorrowful" or "the Weeper": Sends those who hear it into Death, even the ringer. It is nearly impossible to return to life after hearing Astarael.

Using any of the bells must be done cautiously, as using one may have unintended consequences, and the bells sometimes seem to have a mind of their own. For example, the Abhorsen may use Mosrael with the intention of waking and summoning a helpful spirit, but other Dead in the vicinity may also hear it and be woken.

Like all three bloodlines, the Abhorsen bloodline not only defines their job (the Abhorsen may only be chosen from direct blood relatives) and grants them their powers, but also determines their appearance. All members of the Abhorsen family have black hair and their skin is unnaturally pale.

Among the families guarding the Old Kingdom from disaster, and the only family guarding it from Death, Abhorsens are unique in their ability to sense Death. They are able to identify Dead creatures and differentiate them from the living, and cross over into Death to fight the Dead there and banish them to a final death. They are also the only ones who have the proper authority to enter Death, and therefore the only necromancers who retain uncorrupted Charter marks and mage powers.

The Abhorsen's symbol is a silver key on a background of blue.

==== The Royal Family ====
For centuries, the royalty justly ruled the Old Kingdom from their palace at the capital Belisaere as powerful upholders of the peace, until their fall by the hands of Kerrigor, or Prince Rogirek nicknamed Rogir, a rogue member of the royal family who killed his sisters and mother to use their blood to break the Great Charter Stones. The Kingdom now suffers from their 200-year absence. Unlike the Abhorsens, the Royalty cannot cross into Death at will and do not usually use Free Magic. Their specialty lies in diplomacy and Charter magic. They are connected to the Clayr and Abhorsens in that they're a Great Charter. It is thought they are descended from Dyrim, the "speaker", because of their skill in diplomacy. Their symbol is a golden tower on a sea of red.

==== The Clayr ====
The largest family among the magical bloodlines, the Clayr are arbiters of justice and foresight who see all from their glacier in the northernmost parts of the Old Kingdom. The Clayr are a family of seers who may, when there is need, pool their powers together to see clear visions of the future, while individually they see only splinters. The Clayr also possess abilities in Charter Magic, but to a lesser extent than the Abhorsen or Royal family lines. They are descended from Mosrael, the "waker". The Clayr celebrate the young's "awakening" of their sight when they receive their first vision. Like the Abhorsen, the Clayr have a strong family resemblance. All daughters of the Clayr (they have few sons), excluding Remembrancers, have brown skin and blonde, almost white, hair. The Glacier of the Clayr is home to a great library, as well, which is a repository of magic and history, and is even used as "cold storage" for particularly dangerous, but immortal, creatures. Their symbol is a seven pointed star.

==== The Wallmakers ====
The Wallmakers were the builders of the Wall that divides the Old Kingdom from Ancelstierre and creators of the Charter Stones; A Charter Magic bloodline particularly skilled in the creation of magical objects. They created the weaponry of the Royal Family (such as the twin swords wielded by Touchstone), the ceramic, nearly impervious armor known as Gethre owned by the Abhorsens, the Abhorsen's sword, and other powerful Charter Magic objects and weapons possessed by the Clayr. It can be deduced that they were the last 2 bright shiners, Ranna and Belgaer. They invested all of their power in their creations, thus leaving no bloodline. Therefore, for the majority of the books, it is apparent that the Wallmakers are 'extinct' and no longer exist. By the end of Lirael and for the whole of Abhorsen, we find out that the Wallmaker bloodline has been reconstituted in Prince Sameth, explaining his uncanny ability to create magical "toys" and enchant weaponry, which otherwise would 'take months' to do. The line was probably brought back for the sole purpose of defeating Orannis. The symbol of the Wallmaker is a silver trowel or spade.

==== The Dead and Free Magic Creatures ====
The Greater Dead: The souls of dead necromancers who have used their dark knowledge to rise from Death. These creatures are the strongest of the Dead and with their necromantic powers they can raise and command the lesser dead. The most powerful of the Greater Dead is Kerrigor, who is the only undead creature to retain his full potential for Free magic after death. Sabriel implies that the true home of the greater dead is beyond the Seventh Gate of Death.

The Lesser Dead: The collective name for all dead spirits which lack the knowledge and power it takes to become one of the greater dead. Most lesser dead are the souls after ordinary mortals who refused to accept death. They often died under unfortunate circumstances, like Thralk who died in a hunting accident. It is also implied that powerful undead can enslave unwilling souls and force them to become lesser dead. Sabriel fears this fate when she is running from the Mordicant.

Mordicant: A powerful Lesser Dead Free Magic creature which can easily pass through the Gates of Death and into Life where it has a strong hold. It is created by a necromancer by molding bog-clay and human blood, infusing it with Free Magic, and placing a Dead spirit inside. It is described as man-like, with eyes like fire, and grey-green flesh that drips with flames and smoke. Sabriel defeated a weak Mordicant when she was fourteen years old. However, a very strong one stalked Sabriel on her journey from Ancelstierre to the Abhorsen's House. As Sabriel drew closer to the Door in the Long Cliffs leading to the Abhorsen's House, it gave chase, but Sabriel made it to the door and through a passageway due to its Charter Magic Guard which momentarily held off the Mordicant. The Abhorsen's bridge leading to the house stopped the Mordicant as the undead cannot cross fast and deep running water. The Mordicant then led a siege using Shadow hands and living human slaves who worked non-stop for days to fill the river with earth to allow him to cross. To end the siege, Sabriel called on the Clayr's gift of water bringing forth a massive wave to wipe the Mordicant and his slaves away.

Thralk: A dead spirit that slipped out of Death after the commotion Kerrigor caused in breaking through all the gates single-handedly. It stayed in Life for decades, feeding off humans. It found Sabriel in Life on Cloven Crest while she was in Death, though surrounded by a diamond of protection. Sabriel sensed when the creature broke through her protection, and banished it to death with the Abhorsen's sword and the bell Kibeth. Thralk died 300 years before when a hunting spear rebounded off a rock and cut his throat.

Shadow Hands: Dead creatures controlled and created by a necromancer. Usually a skilled necromancer uses the heads of dead humans to bring back only their spirits, forming an incorporeal, and dark shadow that only has a pair of hands and does the bidding of the necromancer. Shadow Hands are difficult to destroy by mere force, but can be easily put to rest by the bells of the Abhorsen. Sabriel suspected a necromancer of having formed Shadow Hands from the soldiers close to Cloven Crest. They attacked Wyverly College after the Dead Hands made it past the soldiers and while Sabriel was attempting to destroy Rogirrek (Rogir)/Kerrigor's body.

Mordaut: One of the weaker Dead creatures; a parasite. It cohabits a human body, controlling and hiding in it, and slowly saps the life from it in order to avoid Death. Once it has nearly consumed the soul of the host, it comes out at night and takes the life of any other human around it. It has no definite form and moves like a pool of darkness from host to host. Sabriel encountered a Mordaut on the tiny rocky islet of Nestowe, inhabiting the body of a fisherman named Patar. Once she had sensed it and was putting it to sleep with Ranna, the Mordaut killed Patar by sucking all the life out of him instantly. Sabriel stabbed it with her sword and sent it deep into Death using the bells Saraneth (the Binder), Ranna (the Sleepbringer), and Kibeth (the Walker).

Gore Crows: Ordinary crows trapped, killed with a ritual, and infused with a single human spirit by a necromancer. They disintegrate in the sun, are torn apart by wind, and decay over time, but they can fly over running water. They are strongest when freshly killed, infused with a strong spirit, and are great in numbers. They seemingly fly without the use of wings or plumage as they are suspended by the Free Magic which was used to create them. A flock of gore crows attacks Sabriel when she is flying in the Paperwing after escaping from Abhorsen's house.

== Characters in Sabriel ==
- Sabriel — Title character. 53rd Abhorsen. She is 18 and finishing her last year at Wyverly College at the start of the novel.
- Mogget — An ancient Free Magic construct of unknown origin; appears in the form of a white cat and is bound by a red Charter magic collar to serve the Abhorsen.
- Touchstone — A bastard prince, son of a former Queen and a nobleman, and is the only remaining heir of the Royal Blood. He was trapped as the wooden figurehead of a ceremonial boat for two hundred years by the Abhorsen of that time in order to save him (and his Blood) from death. He is also Sabriel's growing love interest as the story progresses.
- Kerrigor — Formerly known as Rogir, or Rogirek. A Greater Dead adept in Free Magic necromancy, former member of the Royal Family, and who is at odds with the Charter. Powerful Spells of past Abhorsens bound him to Death and his body was buried in Ancelstierre beyond the Wall where magic was not present; but during Sabriel's father's time, he has awoken and once again trying to destroy the Charter which binds Free Magic. The name Kerrigor, as is revealed by Touchstone, was a childhood nickname, made up by the royal prince himself. It is derived from his full ceremonial name, Rogirek.
- Terciel (known as "Abhorsen") — Sabriel's father, Abhorsen before Sabriel. Revived his daughter after she died at birth. He was unable to save his wife, who died during child birth. Although he rarely visited her physically while she was at school, he would often visit her through sendings of himself in the fireplace at the dark of the moon each month.

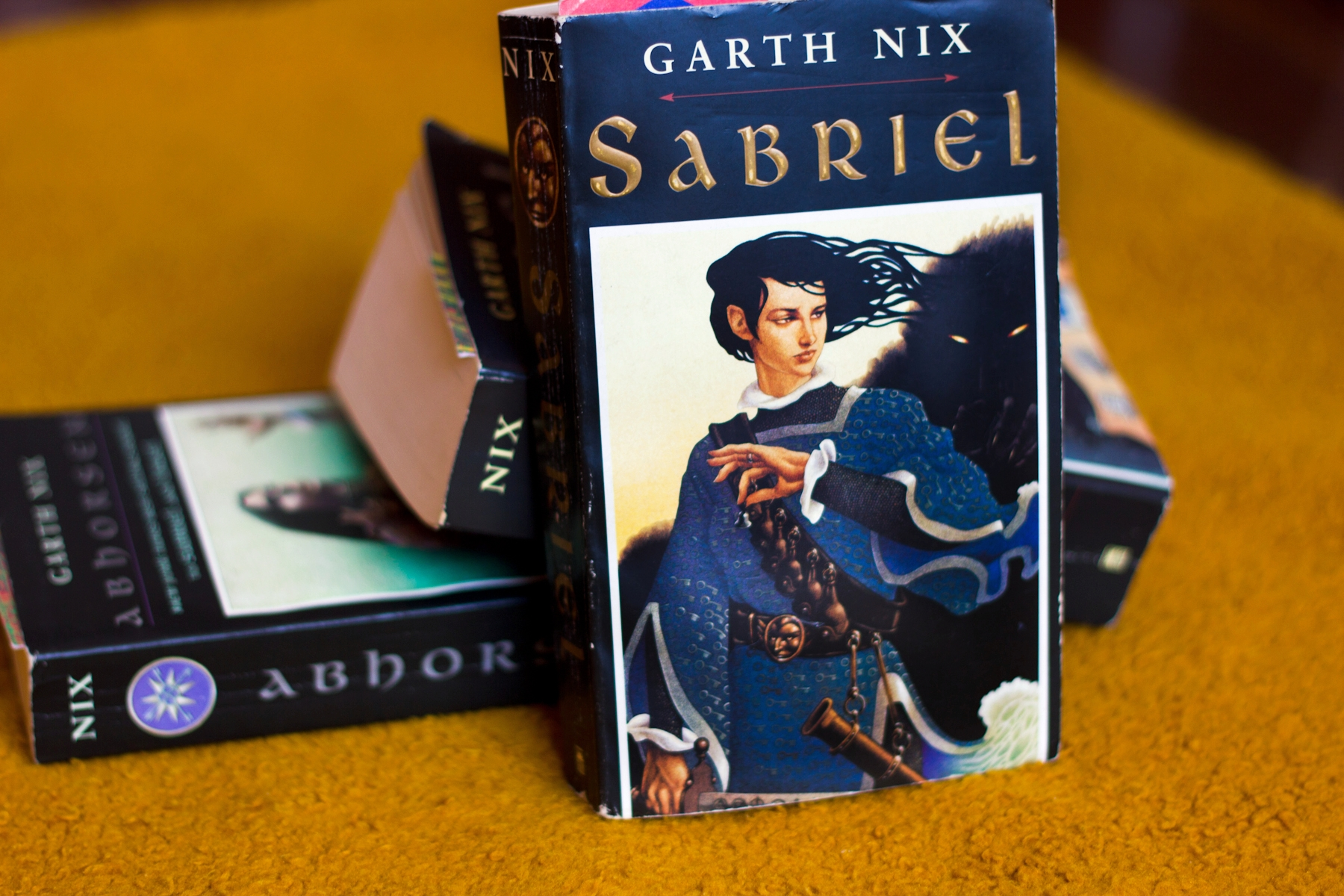
Paperback Sabriel copy

== Awards ==
Sabriel won the Aurealis Award for best young-adult novel and best fantasy novel in 1995. It is also an ALA Notable Book and was a short-list nominee for the 1996 Ditmar Award for best long fiction.

== Film ==
According to Publishing News, Garth Nix was preparing to pitch a Sabriel film to studios in mid-2008 via Steve Fisher at Agency for the Performing Arts. Nix co-wrote the screenplay with Dan Futterman, actor and Oscar-nominated screenwriter of Capote (2005), and Dede Gardner and Jeremy Kleiner at Plan B Entertainment were to produce. The director would be Anand Tucker. Planning for the pitch was delayed by the writer's strike, and resumed in February. While the current status of any film is unknown, Nix is now represented by Matthew Snyder at Creative Artists Agency.
