= The Old Kingdom =

Fantasy book series

Old Kingdom/Abhorsen series
- Map of the Old Kingdom and Ancelstierre
- Sabriel (1995); Lirael (2001); Abhorsen (2003); Clariel (2014); Goldenhand (2016); Terciel and Elinor (2021)
- Author: Garth Nix
- Country: Australia
- Language: English
- Genre: Fantasy, young adult
- Published: 1995–present
- Media type: Print
- No. of books: 6

The Old Kingdom, or Abhorsen in North America and the UK, is a fantasy series written by Australian author Garth Nix. It originated in 1995 with the novel Sabriel and has continued in the novels Lirael (2001), Abhorsen (2003), Goldenhand (2016), and Terciel & Elinor (2021), as well as a prequel novel titled Clariel (2014). The Old Kingdom also consists of the novella The Creature in the Case (2005) and various other short fiction. (Note: ISFDB defines novels and short fiction by word count, same as the American Science Fiction Writers.)

In Australia an omnibus edition comprising three novels and one novella was titled The Old Kingdom Chronicles. Omnibus editions in the U.S. have been titled The Abhorsen Trilogy (2003) and The Abhorsen Chronicles (2009). ISFDB catalogues the entire continuing series as "The Old Kingdom / Abhorsen".

== Books in the series ==
=== Sabriel ===
The protagonist, Sabriel, is in her final few days at her school in Ancelstierre (an alternate history of 1910s England), when she is visited by a spirit summoned by her father (the Abhorsen), who is trapped in Death, and departs to rescue him. Travelling into the Old Kingdom, while being hunted, Sabriel makes her way to the ancestral house of the Abhorsens to get clues, equipment, and help. Accompanied by her father's assistant Mogget, she discovers Touchstone; and with him continues to Belisaere (the capital of the Old Kingdom). In a sacred site under the city, Sabriel briefly frees her father, who diverts the antagonist Kerrigor while the others escape.

Sabriel and Touchstone then travel to Ancelstierre to destroy Kerrigor's body, which the local soldiery (at their behest) convey to Wyverly College, Sabriel's school. Kerrigor and his undead followers besiege the college, killing many students and guardsmen; whereupon Mogget, in his true form, fights Kerrigor for the right to kill Sabriel. Kerrigor consumes Mogget and throws Sabriel onto her sword; whereupon she throws Mogget's binding ring over Kerrigor. This creates two cats: a black Kerrigor and white Mogget, which are then bound by Ranna. Sabriel then dies, but is resurrected by her ancestors to succeed her father as the Old Kingdom's protector.

=== Lirael ===
The protagonist, Lirael, is raised among the Clayr; but having coal-black hair, a pale complexion, and brown eyes, differs physically from her chestnut-skinned, white-blonde, blue or green-eyed peers, and additionally lacks their native precognition. While trying to make a canine sending, she accidentally summons the immortal 'Disreputable Dog', thereafter her constant companion. In Ancelestierre, Prince Sameth (the son of Sabriel and Touchstone) is attacked by the necromancer Hedge and his summoned Dead Hands (a zombie-like construct); and Sameth's friend Nicholas 'Nick' Sayre is placed under Hedge's control. Sameth's father, Touchstone, thereafter conveys him to their capital Belisaere. Here he is expected to succeed his mother as the Abhorsen, a future of which he is terrified.

Concurrently, Nick Sayre crosses the border into the Old Kingdom and continues to the Red Lake: a region in the south-west of the Kingdom where neither the royal rule nor the Clayr's 'Sight' has influence. Upon news thereof, Sameth goes in search of him, and is later joined by Mogget. Meanwhile, Lirael inherits the artifacts of a Remembrancer (a clairvoyant able to view the past) and is swiftly dispatched to fulfill a very recent vision of herself and Nick Sayre upon the Red Lake. She is joined by Sameth and Mogget en route. All are attacked repeatedly and nearly overcome by Chlorr of the Mask; but they reach the Abhorsens' House, where Lirael is identified as Sabriel's half-sister and heir, and Sameth as successor to the previously extinct 'Wallmakers'.

=== Abhorsen ===
The Abhorsen's House is besieged by Dead Hands led by Chlorr of the Mask (an undead sorceress) under the control of the necromancer Hedge. Hedge himself serves Orannis the Destroyer, an immortal imprisoned millennia prior by 7 of its 8 cohorts and now wants to destroy the biosphere. The protagonists escape the siege through a well-like opening, in whose adjoined tunnel they encounter the spirit 'Astarael' (the originator of the Abhorsens' power). Meanwhile, Prince Sameth's parents, the Abhorsen Sabriel and King Touchstone, are in Ancelstierre to stop the genocide of refugees; but are nearly themselves killed by rebels and return to the Old Kingdom. Thereafter descendants of each of the powers that originally created the Charter unite at the two nations' dividing Wall (a fictionalized Hadrian's Wall) to re-enact the imprisonment of Orannis; and having done so, Lirael's 'Disreputable Dog' (a self-identified remnant of the spirit 'Kibeth') revives the dead Nicholas Sayre and departs into the border dividing Life from Death.

=== Clariel ===
Clariel, a prequel to the original three books of the series, is set some six hundred years before the events of Sabriel, in an Old Kingdom ruled by an absent King, Orrikan, who refuses to rule, or abdicate to someone who will, until his granddaughter returns to take the crown. In his place, the mercantile Guilds have taken power, led by the powerful Kilp, the Guildmaster of the Goldsmiths, who rules as governor in Belisaere. Clariel is the seventeen-year-old daughter of Jaciel, a talented goldsmith, the estranged daughter of the current Abhorsen and a cousin of the King. A descendant of two of the ancient bloodlines that bind the Kingdom to the Charter, Clariel is a berserk, disinterested in Charter Magic but whose rage and strong will gives her a latent affinity to Free Magic. Clariel's reluctant admission to an academy for the young elite and an encounter with a Free Magic creature leaves her curious about its forbidden power. After a meeting with the King ends badly, Clariel is taken to dine at the Governor's manor, where a chance encounter uncovers that Kilp's son (Clariel's unwanted fiancé) has consorted with a Free Magic creature to cheat his way up the Guild. Clariel's family is killed in the fighting that follows, Clariel briefly escapes, only to be captured. On the verge of escaping once more she is rescued and is spirited away to the Abhorsen's estates in the south, only to be locked away by the Abhorsen for her own safety. Fearing that her parents will not be avenged, Clariel conspires with Mogget to free two of the Free Magic entities imprisoned in the House and to bind them to do her bidding. In the process of doing so, Clariel corrupts her Charter Mark, weakening her link with the Charter and her ability to perform Charter Magic, but at the same time allowing her to perform feats of magic using her own raw willpower to shape and control Free Magic. When she reaches the city, she kills Kilp and his son and rescues the King, only to nearly be killed by the creatures she has bound, who have conspired with Mogget to use the King's blood to break the Great Charter Stones. She is saved by Belatiel, the new Abhorsen, but is disfigured and badly injured. Belatiel assists her to the forests of the far north, and gives her a bronze mask she earlier used to protect herself from Free Magic. Clariel is destined to later become Chlorr of the Mask.

=== Goldenhand ===
Feeling restless after the events of Abhorsen and reeling from the loss of the Disreputable Dog, Lirael makes her way to The Wall to find Nicholas Sayre lying there unconscious, having woken up a Hrule — a rare free magic creature which drinks blood. From there, they journey to the Clayr's Glacier for further medical attention. At the same time, Ferin of the Athask is racing towards the Clayr's Glacier with an urgent message from Lirael's mother. Chlorr of the Mask is doing everything to stop her, as she brings necromancers together to battle at the Greenwash Bridge. Nicholas is discovered to be capable of acting as a Charter Stone, and so he and Lirael journey to the north in order to send Chlorr of the Mask to her final resting place.

=== Terciel and Elinor ===
Bonnier Books UK has signed a deal with Garth Nix for a new novel in the Old Kingdom series and his backlist, marking the first time the series will be housed under one roof in the UK.

The novel was released on November 2, 2021, and follows Sabriel's parents, Terciel and Elinor. Per Publishers Weekly:

As young, brown-skinned Terciel moves from a life of hunger to an apprenticeship as Abhorsen-in-Waiting in the Old Kingdom, 19-year-old Elinor takes to the stage and practices carnival skills across the wall, in nonmagical Ancelstierre. After surviving an assault on her home through Terciel’s timely intervention, Elinor takes a position at magic-teaching girls’ school Wyverley College, hoping to learn magic—with which she is newly acquainted—and prepare to travel to the Old Kingdom. When an incident sees her reunited with Terciel, and whisked to the Abhorsen’s House by a distant relative who reveals Elinor’s connection to a sisterhood of seeresses, she finds that she is to play a vital part in the fight against a powerful Dead creature.

== Novellas and short stories ==
=== The Creature in the Case ===
The novella The Creature in the Case was published for 2005 World Book Day (HarperCollins Children's Books, March 2005, ISBN 978-0-00-720138-9). It was retitled "Nicholas Sayre and the Creature in the Case" for collection in Across the Wall: A Tale of the Abhorsen and Other Stories (2005).

According to the publisher, "It is six months since the cataclysmic events of Abhorsen ...". Nicholas Sayre is sent by his Uncle Edward to a party, to observe the workings of a clandestine government organisation responsible for gathering information about the Old Kingdom. The organisation's head, Alastor Dorrance, has covertly obtained a monstrous 'Hrule' and intends to free it across the Wall; and when he attempts to do so, it runs amok, destroying numerous people until pursued by Nicholas to the Wall, where it is rendered harmless by Lirael.

=== An Extract of the Journal of Idrach the Lesser Necromancer ===
This short story was distributed by the Old Kingdom series web site and collected in Across the Wall (Allen & Unwin (Australia), 2005).

=== An Essay on Free Magic ===
A short text released on the Old Kingdom Website.

=== To Hold the Bridge ===
The novella To Hold the Bridge was published in 2010 as part of the anthology Legends of Australian Fantasy, edited by Jack Dann and Jonathan Strahan (HarperCollins Publishers Australia, 2010, ISBN 978-0-7322-8848-8). It has also been published outside of Australia in a new collection of the author's works, To Hold the Bridge (HarperCollins, 2015, ISBN 978-0-0622-9252-0).

=== Doctor Crake Crosses the Wall ===
This short story appears on the Old Kingdom series web site as a bonus feature.

=== One Wyverley Summer ===
For the 25th anniversary edition of Sabriel, the short story One Wyverley Summer was included as a bonus feature.

== Magic ==
=== The Charter and Free Magic ===
In the Old Kingdom, magic takes two forms: Free Magic or Charter Magic. The former is older, and natural in origin, whereas the latter is imposed (in-universe, by the immortal 'Seven Bright Shiners') as an assurance of order. Some Free Magic remains in the world, mainly in various breeds of monster. The Charter is described as an "endless flow" of symbols describing the cosmos; each used by magicians to achieve psychokinesis. The composition of spells ranges from single Charter marks to long series requiring a 'master mark' and sometimes a physical focus (typically a sword or wand). Though Free Magic is 'corrosive' to living things and Charter Magic, Free Magic spells are required to pass the Gates of Death, and the calls of the Abhorsen's bells are Free Magic spells subject to the Charter. Although the Abhorsen may use Free Magic without suffering long-term ill effects, typical necromancers are ultimately "devoured by the Free Magic they profess to master". Practitioners of Charter Magic have a Charter Mark drawn on their forehead at birth. Marks unsullied by Free Magic are used to identify true Charter Mages (as opposed to Free Magic sorcerers or constructs in disguise).

The Five Great Charters: In Sabriel, the Five Great Charters are identified by a song:

Five Great Charters knit the land.
Together linked, hand in hand.
One in the people who wear the Crown.
Two in the folk who keep the Dead down.
Three and Five became stone and mortar.
Four sees all in frozen water.

This rhyme dictates that at some point in history the Five Great Charters were concentrated in physical objects, or human bloodlines. The bloodlines are those of the royals, the Abhorsen, the Clayr, and the Wallmakers. After this, the entire Wallmaker line physically became the Great Charter Stones and the Wall that separates the Old Kingdom from Ancelstierre, to prevent contamination of their descent. The Great Charter Stones are located in an underground reservoir in the Old Kingdom's capital, Belisaere, and are the sources of Charter Magic in the Old Kingdom. Under the influence of the Wall, magic, both Free and Charter, exists only in the Old Kingdom; but can be practised in northern Ancelstierre, and further south if there is a strong wind from the Old Kingdom.

=== Bestiary ===
Strictly speaking, there are five basic supernatural creatures in the Old Kingdom series:

The Dead: The Dead are ghosts with both the inclination and the ability to resist the river of Death, who re-enter the world of Life. Though a rare few emerge into Life on their own power, most must be summoned by a necromancer or emerge near a broken Charter Stone (where the Charter's influence has been severely diminished, creating a "door into Death"), or where many deaths have recently occurred. All Dead are averse to running water, and most are unable to withstand direct sunlight.

There are two classes of Dead: Lesser and Greater. The Greater Dead are usually represented by Dead from beyond the Fifth Gate (spirits from the deeper realms of Death and correspondingly more powerful). Examples of the Greater Dead include Chlorr of the Mask, Lathal the Abomination (ultimately destroyed by Lirael), and Kerrigor (defeated by Sabriel). Greater Dead, such as Fifth-Gate Resters or Dead Adepts, may exist in Life without a physical body (making them much more difficult to destroy).

The name of Lesser Dead refers to Dead Hands, Ghlims, Mordauts, and Gore Crows: a range of re-embodied spirits, often used by necromancers as weapons. Lesser Dead may be incapacitated by immersing them in running water or by destroying their physical bodies with Charter Magic or explosives; Shadow Hands are impossible to harm by strictly physical means, but may be unraveled by specialized Charter Magic spells or returned to Death by the necromantic bells. Most Dead prey on the living to remain in Life.

Constructs: Free Magic constructs are forms assumed by Free Magic elementals or powerful Dead spirits (such as Kerrigor). Though such constructs may be destroyed, destroying the Elemental itself is much more difficult and typically the province of Free Magic.

Mordicants: These are fiery constructs of clay and blood, animated by Free Magic and guided by a Greater Dead spirit able to move between Life and Death at will. They are fierce combatants, and seem to have enhanced senses, able to track specific targets over hundreds of miles, resisting direct sunlight to do so. The word mordicant comes from a Latin term meaning gnawing.

Free Magic Elementals: These are free-willed beings wholly composed of Free Magic. The most common elementals belong to specific "breeds" (such as Stilken, Magrue, Jerreq, or Hish), while the most powerful are unique, or "of a singular nature". Though "many thousands" of Free Magic Elementals escaped the creation of the Charter, most were later imprisoned or enslaved by it. Of the remainder, "no truly dangerous creature of Free Magic has woken in a thousand years, save to the sound of Mosrael and Saraneth, or by a direct summons using their secret names". Some cannot be destroyed except by a Free Magic sorcerer more powerful than they, or by immersion in running water (though Free Magic creatures of the Third Kindred, or those infused with the essence of the Nine, are exempt from this rule). Charter Magic is typically ineffective.

Charter Sendings: Charter Sendings are servants or sentries constructed entirely of Charter Marks. Many may only act within a given function, which can be of indefinite complexity. Certain fixtures excepted (such as a surcoat or insignia), Charter Sendings do not possess a concrete physical shape, and derive identity primarily from their function. They are capable of emotive response, but show little desire except to fulfill their mandates.

=== The Bells ===
The bells of necromancy are seven eponymous bells used by necromancers to control the Dead, named after the Seven Bright Shiners who invested themselves in the Charter. From smallest to largest they are:

Ranna, the Sleeper, prompting drowsiness in the hearer;

Mosrael, the Waker, transmitting the ringer further into Death but the hearer into Life;

Kibeth, the Walker, which can give the Dead freedom of movement or force them to walk according to the ringer's intention;

Dyrim, the Speaker, used either to revive or annul the hearer's ability to speak;

Belgaer, the Thinker, used to restore or remove memory;

Saraneth, the Binder, a favorite of the Abhorsens, used to control the Dead directly; and

Astarael, the Weeper, also named Sorrowful, which sends both ringer and hearer far into Death.

Each bell has a specific power over the Dead and Free Magic creatures, and if used by a skilled necromancer, also on living people. An errant or improper ring can affect the caster instead of the target, or cause other adverse effects. The Abhorsens' bells are a "free-willed blend of Charter and Free Magic", though the spells they cast are "pure Free Magic".

=== The Nine Bright Shiners ===
These are the most advanced and powerful Free Magic elementals, of which seven created the Charter and are represented by the necromancers' bells. Of the remaining two, Yrael later became Mogget, the Abhorsens' companion; and Orannis, "last and mightiest of the Nine", opposed the Charter and was imprisoned by the Seven. According to "An Extract of the Journal of Idrach the Lesser Necromancer", a text posted on the series' website, the correlation of the Seven and the necromantic bells includes the Precincts of Death, with each bell equalling a specific Precinct. This would suggest that the additional precincts are related to the 8th and 9th "Bright Shiners", although it is not known which Precinct corresponds to which Bright Shiner.

Because Astarael appears under Abhorsen's House and Kibeth as the Disreputable Dog, it can be inferred that Ranna, Mosrael, Dyrim, Belgaer, and Saraneth became the Five Great Charters. These Great Charters invested themselves entirely within the bloodlines and artifacts of the Old Kingdom, as opposed to Astarael and Kibeth, who retained enough of themselves to remain separate entities (the Disreputable Dog points out that she is only Kibeth in a "hand-me-down sort of way"). It is implied that Saraneth and Mosrael wove themselves into the Abhorsen and Clayr bloodlines respectively. Additionally, Lirael (a "Remembrancer", only made possible by her shared Clayr and Abhorsen heritage) is referred to as "Astarael's get" in The Creature in the Case, and Prince Sameth is referred to as a "Wallmaker" (Ranna and Belgaer) in Abhorsen. Dyrim is considered the Great Charter of the royal bloodline.

Yrael, also known as Mogget, initially refused to take a side for or against Orannis, and was therefore later enslaved to the Abhorsen by the other immortals. Whenever unbound, he tries to kill the current Abhorsen; but, during Orannis' second binding, he assists in the binding ritual. To Sabriel, Lirael, and Sameth, Mogget appears as a small white cat; to Terciel, Sabriel's father and predecessor as Abhorsen, Mogget adopted a different name, Moregrim, and appeared as an albino dwarf. Mogget cannot use his dwarf-form without the permission of the current Abhorsen or Abhorsen-in-Waiting: Jerizael, the forty-eighth Abhorsen, forbade him from doing so for reasons unknown. At the end of the series, he re-appears as a cat.

In Lirael, when Orannis possesses Nicholas Sayre and speaks to the necromancer Hedge, the story of the Binding is told in a song very similar to the English folk song Green Grow the Rushes, O:

I'll sing you a song of the long ago.
Seven shine the Shiners, oh!
What did the Seven do way back when?
Why, they wove the Charter then!
Five for the warp, from beginning to end.
Two for the woof, to make and mend.
That's the Seven, but what of the Nine—
What of the two that chose not to shine?
The Eighth did hide, hide all away,
But the Seven caught him and made him pay.
The Ninth was strong and fought with might,
But lone Orannis was put out of the light,
Broken in two and buried under hill,
Forever to lie there wishing us ill.

=== Death ===
Death consists of Nine Precincts divided by Nine Gates, through which a grey river flows. Almost everything in Death is a bleak grey, and a subtle grey fogginess limits visibility. The river may also contain and conceal hostile dead beings, who attack living travelers. Only Abhorsens, Remembrancers, or Free Magic Necromancers can cross the boundary at will. Dead spirits can cross only when aided by a Necromancer, or when the border is weakened by a concentration of (often violent) deaths. Dexterity and great willpower are required to resist the current, which is psychological as well as physical. Each gate responds to a Free Magic spell wielded by Abhorsens and Necromancers; Dead cannot pass any Gate unless they are very powerful. Each Precinct contains a different peril.

The First Precinct is mostly knee-deep water, but has eddies and pools dangerous to the interloper. Its Gate is a huge waterfall.

The Second Precinct has pitfalls throughout its domain and low visibility; its Gate is a whirlpool.

The Third Precinct has slightly warmer ankle-deep water and visibility is slightly improved. Periodic, irresistible waves carry dead creatures through the Gate (a wall of mist), often beyond the final Ninth Gate.

The Fourth Precinct has a low concentration of Dead, as most of those who reach it have been stunned by the Third Precinct's waves, and are carried easily to the dangerous and deceptively short waterfall that comprises its Gate.

The Fifth Precinct is too deep to wade, and must be crossed by a thin black bridge that frequently attracts dead creatures. The water in the Fifth Precinct has strong mutagenic properties, and is implied to be partially responsible for the monstrous appearance of some Greater Dead and necromancers. The Gate is a vertical river rising from the floor.

The Sixth Precinct has no current, and its water is present as a shallow pool. There are many Dead creatures in this Precinct, some of whom are Greater Dead. The Gate has no substance and can appear anywhere, but appears as a lift bordered by a cylinder of water.

The Seventh Precinct is not described, though presumably it is similar to the First and Fourth Precincts. Its Gate is a line of fire that stretches across the river.

The Eighth Precinct resembles the First and Fourth, but interspersed with flashes of fire. The Eighth Gate is a wall of darkness, which needs a spell to send a necromancer into the Ninth Precinct.

The Ninth Precinct is an endless pool of deep, still, clear water. It is warmer than the other precincts and there is no fog, allowing a necromancer to see in every direction. The Ninth Gate, resembling a starry sky, confirms the final death of any who look upon it, except those to whom remain a native span of years. Those claimed by the Gate rise at varying speeds and vanish, never to return. Once a being has begun to rise towards the Ninth Gate, it is impossible to stop their ascent; there are thus virtually no Dead in the Ninth Precinct, as any who make it there gaze upon the Ninth Gate and rise towards their final death.

== People ==
=== Abhorsens ===
The Abhorsens are the lineage who imprison and destroy Dead and Free Magic, wherever it threatens mortal life, though inheritance is not always direct; the next Abhorsen could be a niece or cousin or sibling, rather than the current Abhorsen's child. The Abhorsen combines Charter Magic and Free Magic in its bells to control the dead, righting the wrongs created by Necromancers or Free Magic organisms. The Abhorsens' stronghold, called Abhorsen's House, is located on an island in close proximity to a great waterfall; the associated rapids complement the magical wards of the House in keeping the Dead from accessing it. In Nicholas Sayre and the Creature in the Case, the antagonist Hrule calls them "Astarael's get". The origin of the name "Abhorsen", according to Garth Nix, is the name of the executioner from Shakespeare's Measure for Measure: "Abhorson".

=== The Clayr ===
The Clayr are an oracular group composed nearly entirely of women, who live in a snowy mountain called the Clayr's Glacier, in the northern part of the Old Kingdom. Nearly all are beautiful and possess nut-brown skin, pale blond hair, and eyes of blue or green. The Glacier is also home to the Great Library of the Clayr, which contains a variety of treasures, monsters, and rarities in addition to books. Due to the Clayr's precognitive Sight, there are often rooms created for events which unfold decades or centuries later, including the room in which Lirael discovers her fate.

=== The Wall Garrison ===
Soldiers who patrol the wall between the Old Kingdom and Ancelstierre. The soldiers include Ancelstierrean charter mages among their ranks, as charter magic is a more effective defence closer to the Wall and the Old Kingdom.

=== Southerlings ===
A group of thousands of refugees from the nations south of Ancelstierre. The necromancer Hedge killed many more of them and used their bodies to house dead spirits. They were referred to as the night crew at the lightning trap digging site.

== Places ==
=== The Old Kingdom ===
The Old Kingdom is the setting for most of the series; it corresponds roughly with Scotland. Ancelstierre (analogous to England) and the Old Kingdom travel differently through time, with the hour of the day and the season of the year rarely in synchrony; therefore, it is possible to spend more time in the Old Kingdom than one is absent from Ancelstierre. The Old Kingdom is also the source of all charter magic. The closer a person is to the Old Kingdom, the more easily they can do charter magic. Charter magic is also possible when the wind is blowing from the north, i.e. from the Old Kingdom.

Two hundred years before Sabriel, the reigning Queen and her two daughters were murdered by Kerrigor and their blood used to break two of the six Great Charter Stones. This event was followed by two hundred years of interregnum.

=== Ancelstierre ===
It has been suggested, in a question/answer section of Across the Wall: A Tale of the Abhorsen and Other Stories, by the Disreputable Dog (in Lirael), and some online sources that The Old Kingdom and Ancelstierre are two different parallel realities, that overlap slightly at the Wall. The Old Kingdom also has a northern border which is a river gorge, much farther north than The Clayr's Glacier, where it impinges on another world.

Ancelstierre is culturally and technologically based on pre-WWI Britain.
