= Lirael =

Novel by Garth Nix

- US cover of Lirael, featuring the title character and the Disreputable Dog.
- Author: Garth Nix
- Cover artist: Leo and Diane Dillon
- Language: English
- Series: Old Kingdom series
- Genre: Fantasy novel
- Published: 2001 HarperCollins Publishers
- Publication place: Australia
- Media type: Print (Hardback, Paperback), Audio Books (Cassette, Audio Download, e-book)
- Pages: 720 (Paperback edition)
- ISBN: 0-06-000542-4 (Paperback edition)
- OCLC: 49838023
- Preceded by: Sabriel
- Followed by: Abhorsen

Lirael (called Lirael: Daughter of the Clayr in some regions) is a fantasy novel by Garth Nix, first published in 2001. Named for its central female character, Lirael is the second in his Old Kingdom trilogy, preceded by Sabriel and continued in Abhorsen.

== Plot ==
The book is split into three parts, the first of which is set 14 years after the events in Sabriel; the last two parts are set four to five years after part one. Sabriel and Touchstone have married since Sabriel and assumed a measure of control over the Old Kingdom. Their children Ellimere and Sameth are going to school in Ancelstierre (as Sabriel did in the first book) before being expected to take up their duties in the Old Kingdom.

Lirael, the protagonist, is raised as a Clayr, part of a vast family of precognitive women who dwell in a remote glacier within the Old Kingdom. As she lacks the Clayr's precognitive "Sight", she considers herself not a true Clayr and prefers solitude to company. In young adulthood she joins the staff of the Clayr's Library, and acquires the Disreputable Dog. With the latter's help, she vanquishes a series of monsters in the Library.

Five years later, in Ancelstierre, Prince Sameth encounters the necromancer Hedge and his undead minions, which injures Sameth both spiritually and physically. His father Touchstone therefore takes him back to the Old Kingdom and the safety of the palace in Belisaere. Here he is expected to succeed his mother Sabriel as the Abhorsen: a future whereof he is mortally afraid. Under Hedge's influence, Sameth's friend Nicholas Sayre (an Ancelstierran aristocrat) crosses the border into the Old Kingdom and travels to the Red Lake, where the royal rule does not extend and the Clayr cannot See. Sameth flees the palace to rescue Nick, and is later joined by Mogget. Lirael, on her nineteenth birthday, is identified as a 'Remembrancer' (a clairvoyant able to accurately perceive the past), and sent (with the Dog) to the Red Lake to rescue Nick, who has by now become the host of a malign, alien intelligence. En route, Lirael joins Sam and Mogget, and they continue to the Red Lake, but are nearly vanquished by Chlorr of the Mask and her followers, and recover at the Abhorsen's House. There, Lirael is identified as Sabriel's half-sister and heir, and Sameth with the long-extinct "Wallmakers".

== Characters ==
- Lirael - a young woman raised as an orphan Clayr, half-sister of Sabriel.
- Disreputable Dog - a Free Magic creature also infused with Charter Magic, she was only supposed to be a puppy sending to comfort Lirael; however, while creating the sending, Lirael touched on some ancient magic in the dog statuette she found in the Clayr library and awoke the Dog
- Prince Sameth - the son of King Touchstone and the Abhorsen Sabriel; enjoys making toys and is one, if not the last, of the Wallmakers who made the Wall which divides the two Kingdoms; he has been into Death and was Abhorsen-in-Waiting before Lirael's ascent into the title and role, but his encounter with Hedge has left him with an almost mortal fear of Death
- Mogget - an ancient Free Magic construct of unknown origin; appears in the form of a white cat and is bound by a red Charter magic collar to serve the Abhorsen
- Nicholas Sayre - a friend of Sameth from Ancelstierre, a sceptic who does not believe in magic and is always looking for a scientific reason for magical phenomena.
- Ellimere - Sameth's older sister, destined to be Queen
- Sabriel - the current Abhorsen, who destroyed Kerrigor many years before with the King, the former Abhorsen, and Mogget; is also wed to Touchstone and is Queen
- Touchstone - the King, a bastard son of a Queen and a nobleman who was trapped as a wooden figurehead of a funeral ship for 200 or so years before Sabriel saved him
- Hedge - an ancient necromancer serving a greater power; he attempts to capture Prince Sameth but obtains Nicholas Sayre instead
- Chlorr of the Mask - an ancient necromancer who Sabriel defeats early in Lirael, later raised by Hedge to become one of the Greater Dead
- Sanar and Ryelle - Clayr twins who have the strongest Sight and aid both the Royal family and Lirael

== Reception ==
Laura Blackwell, writing in Strange Horizons, said that Lirael "immediately endears herself by seeming (especially in contrast to Sabriel) like a very normal fourteen-year-old. It's a pleasure to watch her grow from a miserable, cowed adolescent to a strong, quirky young woman."

In 2002 Lirael won the Ditmar Award for the best Australian Science Fiction/Fantasy novel.
