= Monica Furlong =

British author, journalist, poet, and women's activist (1930–2003)

- Born: 17 January 1930; Kenton, Greater London, England
- Died: 14 January 2003 (aged 72); Umberleigh, Devon, England
- Occupations: Author; writer; journalist
- Writing career
- Period: 1950s–'90s
- Genres: Non-fiction, children's fiction, biography
- Subjects: Religion, Church of England, women in religion
- Literary movement: Ordination of women

Monica Furlong (17 January 1930 – 14 January 2003) was a British author, journalist, and activist. She was born at Kenton near Harrow, north-west of London and died at Umberleigh in Devon. An obituary called her the Church of England's "most influential and creative layperson of the post-war period."

== Career ==
Many of Furlong's books reflected a deep interest in religion and spirituality. She wrote biographies of John Bunyan, Trappist monk Thomas Merton, Thérèse of Lisieux, and Alan Watts, as well as books covering such diverse topics as the spiritual life of aboriginals, medieval women mystics, and the Church of England. She also wrote a popular series of children's novels set in medieval England and Scotland: Wise Child, its prequel spinoff Juniper, and its immediate sequel Colman. Furlong's autobiography, Bird of Paradise, was published in 1995.

Furlong began her writing career in 1956 as a feature writer for Truth magazine, where she met Bernard Levin, who became a lifelong friend. She then joined The Spectator as its religious correspondent from 1958 until 1960, before moving to the Daily Mail, where she remained for the next eight years.

In the 1960s, Furlong became involved in religious reform. In her first book, With Love to the Church (1965), she expressed her beliefs in an inclusive Church and sided with those who felt excluded. She became a supporter of the cause of women in the Anglican Church. In the 1980s she campaigned for the ordination of women, and when that goal was reached she called for the appointment of women to senior Church positions. While in her 30s Furlong had used LSD, an experience she described in her book Travelling In (1971); the work was banned from Church of Scotland bookshops.

== Books ==
=== Adult non-fiction ===
- With Love to the Church (1965)
- Contemplating Now (1971)
- Travelling In (1971)
- Puritan's Progress: A Study of John Bunyan (1975)
- Merton: A Biography (1980)
- Zen Effects: the Life of Alan Watts (1986)
  (published in England as Genuine Fake: A Biography of Alan Watts)
- Therese of Lisieux (1987)
- Birds of Paradise: Glimpses of Living Myth (1995)
- Visions and Longings: Medieval Women Mystics (1996)
- C of E: the State It's in (2000)
- Women Pray: Voices through the Ages, from Many Faiths, Cultures, and Traditions (2004)
- ' 'Flight of the Kingfisher: Journey Among the Kukatja Aborigines' ' (1997)

=== Adult fiction ===
- The Cat's Eye (1976)

=== Poetry ===
- God's a good man (1974)

=== Children's fiction ===
==== Wise Child trilogy ====
- Wise Child (1987)
- Juniper (1990)- prequel spinoff to Wise Child
- Colman (2003)- sequel to Wise Child

==== Stand-alone ====
- Robin's Country (1994)
