= Layer cake (disambiguation) =

A layer cake is a pastry made from stacked layers of cake held together by filling.

Layer Cake or layer cake may also refer to:

- In mathematics, the Layer cake representation is a representation of a function in terms of an integral of 'slices' of the function's area
- Layer-cake federalism, is a political arrangement in which power is divided between a federal and state governments in clearly defined terms
- Layer Cake (novel), a 2000 novel by J. J. Connolly
- Layer Cake (film), a 2004 film based on the novel
- Layer cake, a nuclear weapon design, tested by the Soviet Union and China
- Layer Cake, digital music imprint of Dreamlab (production team)
- "Layer Cake", song by Kano (rapper) inspired by the film Layer Cake
