= Reppert =

Reppert is a surname. Notable people with the surname include:

- Howard Reppert (1918–1989), American businessman and politician
- Elsa 'Jack' von Reppert-Bismarck (1903–1971), German painter
- Scott Reppert (born 1960), American football player
- Steven M. Reppert (born 1946), American neuroscientist
- Victor Reppert (born 1953), American philosopher

== See also ==
- Reppert-Gabler House (also known as Building 314A), is a historic home located at Monongahela Township in Greene County, Pennsylvania
- Reppert School of Auctioneering, Auction school in Indianapolis
