= Viva La Madness =

- Directed by: Guy Ritchie
- Screenplay by: J. J. Connolly; Guy Ritchie
- Based on: Viva La Madness by J. J. Connolly
- Produced by: Jason Statham; Thomas Benski; Guy Ritchie; Ivan Atkinson; John Friedberg
- Starring: Jason Statham; Vinnie Jones; Jason Isaacs; Babs Olusanmokun; Camila Mendes; Ben Foster; Jonny Lee Miller; Raúl Alejandro
- Production companies: Punch Palace Productions; Lumina Studios; Toff Guy Films; Black Bear Pictures
- Distributed by: Black Bear Pictures (United States); Amazon MGM Studios (International)
- Release date: January 21, 2028
- Countries: United Kingdom; United States
- Language: English

Viva La Madness is an upcoming action thriller film co-written and directed by Guy Ritchie. It is based on the 2011 novel by J.J. Connolly (who also adapted it with Ritchie), which was a sequel to Layer Cake; however, this film is written without a direct connection to the 2004 adaptation by Matthew Vaughn. Jason Statham stars in the film for his sixth collaboration with Ritchie, with an ensemble cast including Vinnie Jones, Jason Isaacs, Babs Olusanmokun, Camila Mendes, Ben Foster, Jonny Lee Miller, and Raúl Alejandro.

== Cast ==
- Jason Statham as X, a drug dealer
- Vinnie Jones
- Jason Isaacs
- Babs Olusanmokun
- Camila Mendes
- Ben Foster
- Jonny Lee Miller
- Raúl Alejandro

== Production ==
Jason Statham bought the rights to adapt the novel Viva La Madness by J. J. Connolly (his sequel to Layer Cake) in 2013. Connolly initially wrote the script adaptation himself. The adaptation was to become a television series in 2015, in what would have been a first for Statham, with Connolly still writing; however by 2025, the adaptation returned to being a feature film that was taken to the 2025 American Film Market for sales. Guy Ritchie became attached to write and direct, and the details were revealed to be an adaptation of the book's plot without having a direct connection to the 2004 film Layer Cake.

In February 2026, Vinnie Jones, Jason Isaacs, Babs Olusanmokun, Camila Mendes, Ben Foster, Jonny Lee Miller and Raúl Alejandro joined the cast, with production revealed to be underway in London. In May 2026, Ritchie revealed in an interview with Collider that filming had finished in April and the film was now being edited.

== Release ==
Black Bear Pictures acquired the distribution rights in North America, with Amazon MGM Studios holding rights to most international territories. The film is scheduled to be released theatrically on January 21, 2028.
