= Guy Ritchie =

English filmmaker (born 1968)

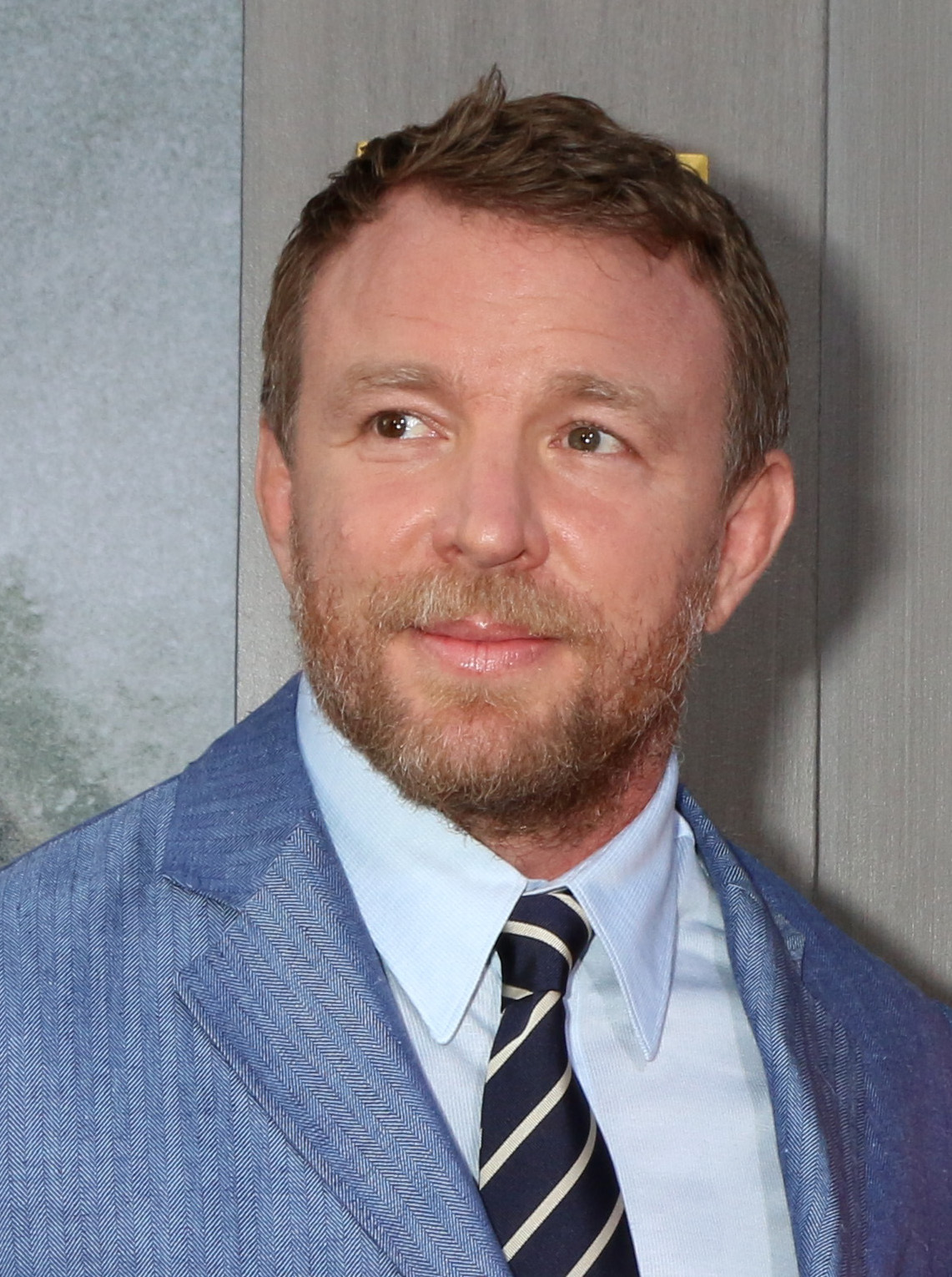
- Ritchie in 2017
- Born: Guy Stuart Ritchie; 10 September 1968 (age 58); Hatfield, Hertfordshire, England
- Occupations: Film director; producer; screenwriter; businessman
- Years active: 1995–present
- Spouses: Madonna (m. 2000; div. 2008); Jacqui Ainsley (m. 2015)
- Children: 5

Guy Stuart Ritchie (born 10 September 1968) is an English filmmaker known primarily for British comedy gangster films and large-scale action-adventure films.

Ritchie left school at the age of 15, and worked in entry-level jobs in the film industry before going on to direct television commercials. In 1995, he directed a short film, The Hard Case, followed by the crime comedy Lock, Stock and Two Smoking Barrels (1998), his feature-length directorial debut. He gained recognition with his second film, Snatch (2000), which found critical and commercial success. Following Snatch, Ritchie directed Swept Away (2002), a critically panned box-office bomb starring Madonna, to whom Ritchie was married between 2000 and 2008. He went on to direct Revolver (2005) and RocknRolla (2008), which were less successful and received mixed reviews. In 2009 and 2011, he directed the box-office hits Sherlock Holmes and its sequel, Sherlock Holmes: A Game of Shadows starring Robert Downey Jr. as the title character. The former movie was nominated for Academy Awards in Best Original Score and Best Art Direction.

His other directed films include The Man from U.N.C.L.E. (2015), based on the 1960s television series, King Arthur: Legend of the Sword (2017), and Aladdin (2019), Disney's live-action adaptation of their 1992 animated film, which grossed over $1 billion worldwide, becoming one of the highest-grossing films in 2019 and the highest-grossing film of Ritchie's career. In 2019, he returned to crime comedy with The Gentlemen (2019), which was mostly well received and a commercial success. He subsequently reteamed with Jason Statham on the action films Wrath of Man (2021) and Operation Fortune: Ruse de Guerre (2023). His second film of 2023, The Covenant, received generally positive reviews.

== Life and career ==
=== 1968–1997: Early life and career beginnings ===
Ritchie was born in Hatfield, Hertfordshire, the second of two children of Amber (née Parkinson) and Captain John Vivian Ritchie, a former Seaforth Highlanders officer and an advertising executive. He has an elder sister, and a half-brother who was born to Amber Parkinson and placed for adoption.

Both of Ritchie's parents remarried. His father's second marriage was to Shireen Ritchie, Baroness Ritchie of Brompton, a former model and later Conservative politician and life peer. Between 1973 and 1980, Ritchie's mother was married to Sir Michael Leighton, 11th Baronet of Loton Park. As a divorcée, she is styled as Amber, Lady Leighton.

Ritchie is dyslexic, and attended Windlesham House School in West Sussex and Stanbridge Earls School in Hampshire. He was expelled from school at the age of 15. He has claimed that drug use was the reason for expulsion, although Ritchie's father said he was "cutting class and entertaining a girl in his room".

=== 1998–2002: Breakthrough ===
After working on a short film, The Hard Case (1995), in 1998, Ritchie met Matthew Vaughn, who had been working in Los Angeles and expressed interest in producing Ritchie's directorial debut, the comedy heist film Lock, Stock and Two Smoking Barrels (1998). It took 15 months to secure financial backing. Trudie Styler served as an executive producer—she said "I've always liked bad-boy movies".

There's a perennial pub debate that poses the question: Which is better, Snatch or Lock Stock? Snatch apologists talk a good game, but the correct answer is, of course, Guy Ritchie's jaw-dropping debut. After all, this is a movie that brought the world 'The Stath', Vinnie Jones hammering someone's skull with a car door, and the knowledge that a big purple dildo can be used as an offensive weapon.

— Empire magazine's entry for Lock, Stock and Two Smoking Barrels on their list of the 100 best British films

The production of Lock, Stock and Two Smoking Barrels took about eight months. It was released in the United Kingdom on 28 August 1998 to critical and commercial success, with Janet Maslin of The New York Times praising Ritchie's "brash, ebullient direction" and "punchy little flourishes that load this English gangster film". The feature earned $28.1 million at the worldwide box office. At the 1999 British Academy Film Awards (BAFTAs), Lock, Stock and Two Smoking Barrels was nominated for three awards: Outstanding British Film, Best Editing and Outstanding Debut by a British Writer, Director or Producer for Vaughn. The film won a BAFTA for Film of the Year. In response to the film's success, Ritchie created a spin-off television series called Lock, Stock.... in 2000. Its success exposed its stars Nick Moran, Jason Statham, Jason Flemyng and Dexter Fletcher to worldwide audiences, and launched the acting career of former footballer Vinnie Jones.

Ritchie's next film was Snatch (2000), another crime-comedy about a group of criminals in London searching for a stolen diamond which starred an ensemble cast including Benicio del Toro, Dennis Farina, Flemyng, Jones, Brad Pitt, Rade Šerbedžija and Statham. Similar to Lock, Stock and Two Smoking Barrels, the film depicted events from different characters' perspectives; a narrative device which he would use in later films. Snatch was released on 23 August 2000 to a commercial success at the box office, grossing more than $83 million worldwide. Mick LaSalle, writing for San Francisco Chronicle, was impressed with Ritchie's directing and "sequences that discharge with energy", but felt the writing could have been better. Film critic Roger Ebert described Ritchie as a "zany, high-energy director" but felt the film's plot "doesn't build and it doesn't arrive anywhere".

In 2001, Ritchie directed a music video for "What It Feels Like for a Girl", a song performed by Madonna, to whom Ritchie was married at the time. In the video, she commits criminal and violent acts towards men; music channels MTV and VH1 banned the video from their rotation, opting to play it only once on the release date. Ritchie directed a short film starring Madonna and Clive Owen, titled Star for season one of The Hire, a 2001 online series to promote BMW automobiles. Ritchie's next film, starring Madonna and Adriano Giannini, was Swept Away (2002), a remake of Lina Wertmüller's 1974 Italian film of the same name. It is a romantic comedy about a wealthy socialite who is shipwrecked on a deserted island with a Communist sailor. The film was a critical and commercial failure, with an average rating of 5% on film review aggregator Rotten Tomatoes. Almar Haflidason of the BBC was critical of the lead actors, writing, "[Madonna] has neither good comedic sense nor any warmth [...] as for Giannini, he spends the first half of the movie endlessly complaining like some old fishwife". The feature won five awards at the 2002 Golden Raspberry Awards for Worst Picture, Worst Actress, Worst Screen Couple, Worst Remake or Sequel and Worst Director.

In 2002, Ritchie conceived a prank show titled Swag, for Channel 5 in the United Kingdom.

=== 2003–2015: Critical disappointments and Sherlock Holmes ===
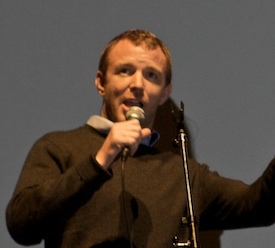
Ritchie at the 2008 Toronto International Film Festival

Ritchie's next heist film Revolver (2005) starred Statham, Ray Liotta, Vincent Pastore, and André Benjamin. The story is about gambler Jake Green (Statham) who is released from prison and seeks revenge on those who stole his money. Filming was completed in late 2004 and the film premiered at the 2005 Toronto International Film Festival. Revolver was released in the United Kingdom on 22 September 2005, but it was critically panned and a commercial failure. Simon Guerrier of FilmFocus gave it one out of five stars, calling it, "tedious, humourless, pretentious and nasty". Adrian Hennigan from the BBC wrote, "the cheeky charm has been replaced by plodding pretentiousness in a film that's illuminated by great action set-pieces and some powerful performances, but not redeemed". Ritchie responded to the criticism by stating, "I don't think anything went wrong with Revolver. By its very nature it's an esoteric movie. It's not designed for the masses". The film was budgeted at $27 million but earned $7.1 million at the worldwide box office. In 2007, Revolver was re-edited and released for the United States.

In 2008, Ritchie directed RocknRolla, for which he also wrote the screenplay. It stars Gerard Butler, Tom Wilkinson, Thandiwe Newton, Mark Strong, Idris Elba, Tom Hardy, and Toby Kebbell. RocknRolla was released on 5 September 2008 in the United Kingdom, reaching number one at the UK box office in its first week of release. Rotten Tomatoes gave the film a 60% rating, stating, "Mixed reviews for Guy Ritchie's return to his London-based cockney wideboy gangster movie roots, but most agree, it's a step in the right direction following two major turkeys". In that same year, Ritchie directed a television commercial for Nike called "Take It To The Next Level". The commercial includes appearances from Cristiano Ronaldo, Cesc Fàbregas, Ronaldinho, Wayne Rooney, and Ruud van Nistelrooy.

Ritchie's next directorial effort was Sherlock Holmes (2009), starring Robert Downey Jr. and Jude Law. The film was released on 25 and 26 December 2009 in the United States and United Kingdom. It was a box-office hit, taking more than $520 million worldwide, and garnered mixed to favourable reviews from critics and general viewers. It received multiple accolades, including two Academy Award nominations for Best Original Score and Best Art Direction, and Downey won a Golden Globe Award for Best Actor. In 2011, Ritchie directed the sequel Sherlock Holmes: A Game of Shadows. It was released on 16 December and was an even greater commercial success, grossing more than $545 million worldwide. A. O. Scott of The New York Times criticised Ritchie for "taking liberties" with the characters, and wrote that both films depict "a smoky, overcast Victorian world, infuses it with an air of jocular, hairy laddishness and stages a lot of fights in fussy and tiresome slow motion".

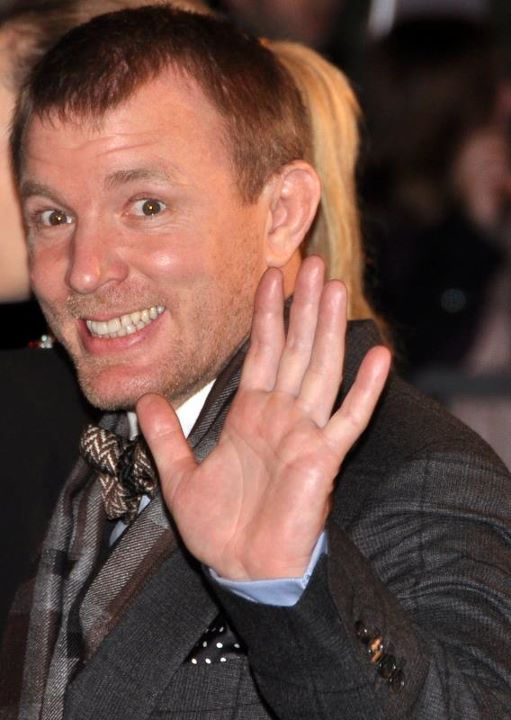
Ritchie at the Paris premiere of Sherlock Holmes: A Game of Shadows, 2012

In 2012, Ritchie produced a trailer for the video game Call of Duty: Black Ops II. In 2013, he directed a commercial for H&M featuring David Beckham. A year later, he directed a commercial for whisky brand Haig, which also stars Beckham. He made a return to film in 2015 with The Man From U.N.C.L.E., a remake of the 1960s spy series. Ritchie and Lionel Wigram wrote the screenplay about a CIA agent and a KGB agent who work together to stop a criminal organisation from constructing a nuclear weapon. Henry Cavill and Armie Hammer played the lead roles. Principal photography commenced in 2013 in London and Italy, with rewrites to the script during filming. It was released on 14 August 2015 by Warner Bros. to a mixed critical reception. Glenn Kenny on RogerEbert.com writes that it "is only intermittently engaging and amusing, and those portions of the movie that succeed are also frustrating." However, he praised Hugh Grant's performance which "saves the movie".

=== 2016–present: Aladdin and return to crime films ===
In January 2014, Warner Bros. hired Ritchie to direct the first of six films in a franchise, fantasy adventure King Arthur: Legend of the Sword (2017) with Charlie Hunnam portraying King Arthur. The feature was released in 2D and 3D on 12 May 2017 in the United States, and a week later in the United Kingdom. Despite high expectations from the studio, it received mixed reviews and was a box-office failure, causing large financial losses for Warner Bros. and Village Roadshow Pictures, and leading to the cancellation of the subsequent sequels.

In August 2017, Ritchie received the Raindance Auteur Award for his contributions to the British film industry. Next, Ritchie directed Disney's live-action adaptation of Aladdin (2019), based on the 1992 animated film of the same name. The plot follows Aladdin, a street urchin, as he falls in love with Princess Jasmine, befriends a Genie, and battles the wicked Jafar. Released on 24 May 2019 in the United States, the film was a commercial success despite mixed reviews; Aladdin earned more than $1 billion worldwide, becoming one of the highest-grossing films in 2019, and the 34th highest-grossing film of all-time during its theatrical run. Writing for the Chicago Sun-Times, Richard Roeper gave the film 3 out of 4 stars, praising Will Smith, Naomi Scott, and Mena Massoud's performances. On Metacritic, Aladdin has a weighted average score of 53 out of 100 based on 50 critics, indicating "mixed or average reviews", and on Rotten Tomatoes, the film holds an approval rating of 57% based on 372 reviews with an average rating of 5.88/10.

In 2020, Ritchie returned to crime comedy with The Gentlemen. The story is about an American expat who tries to sell his marijuana business, which triggers a chain reaction response from various criminals. Released on 1 January in the United Kingdom, and a few weeks later in other countries, the film was generally well received. Anton Bitel of Sight & Sound wrote that it "returns to the sense and sensibilities of his earliest features". Film critic James Berardinelli gave the film 3 1/2 out of four stars, writing, "The Gentlemen takes Ritchie back to his roots" although "the screenplay is too clever by half, with some of the quirkiness being awkward and intrusive." On Rotten Tomatoes, the film gained an approval rating of 74% based on 260 reviews, and earned $115 million worldwide. In October 2020, it was announced that Ritchie was developing a spin-off television series, which was eventually acquired by Netflix; the series was released on Netflix on 7 March 2024.

Ritchie next directed the action thriller Wrath of Man, a remake of the 2004 film Cash Truck, reuniting with Statham. It was released in the United States on 7 May 2021. It was initially set for theatrical release in the United Kingdom by Lionsgate UK, but was instead released straight to streaming on Amazon Prime Video on 10 December 2021.

Ritchie followed up Wrath of Man with the spy thriller Operation Fortune: Ruse de Guerre, again starring Statham. It was scheduled for release in cinemas on 18 March 2022, but was pulled from the schedule a month prior without an explanation; it was eventually released in the United States on 3 March 2023, by Lionsgate. Ritchie next filmed the war drama The Covenant, starring Jake Gyllenhaal, Dar Salim, Antony Starr and Emily Beecham, in February 2022 in Alicante, Spain. The film was released in the United States on 21 April 2023. In June 2022, it was announced that Ritchie had signed on to direct a live-action film adaptation of Disney's Hercules.

In February 2021, Ritchie agreed to direct and write the World War II film The Ministry of Ungentlemanly Warfare, based on the book by Damien Lewis, for producer Jerry Bruckheimer and Paramount Pictures. In October 2022, Henry Cavill and Eiza González were cast in the lead roles, with Paramount no longer involved. The film was released in theatres in the United States on 19 April 2024 by Lionsgate.

In May 2023, weeks after production wrapped on The Ministry of Ungentlemanly Warfare, it was announced Ritchie would next direct the film In the Grey (untitled at the time), starring Cavill, Gyllenhaal and González, set to shoot in Spain in the summer of 2023. It concluded production in October 2023, with Lionsgate acquiring domestic distribution rights and Black Bear UK releasing in the United Kingdom. The film was set to be released in theatres in the United States on 17 January 2025, but was pulled from the release schedule in November 2024 as post-production was not yet finished. Lionsgate would ultimately relinquish distribution rights, with Black Bear Pictures set to release the film themselves on April 10, 2026.

On 6 July 2023, it was announced Ritchie would executive produce the ESPN documentary series Gracie, to be directed by Chris Fuller.

On 11 January 2024, it was announced Ritchie would direct the action adventure film Fountain of Youth, for Skydance Media and Apple Studios, with Natalie Portman, John Krasinski and Domhnall Gleeson set to star and production began in February 2024. The film was released on Apple TV+ on 23 May 2025.

On 28 February 2024, it was announced that Ritchie would serve as director and executive producer alongside Top Boy creator Ronan Bennett on the Ray Donovan spin-off series The Donovans for the streaming service Paramount+. By October 9, the project had been retitled The Associates and had been reworked into a standalone series, with Tom Hardy, Helen Mirren, and Pierce Brosnan in final negotiations to star in the project, now called MobLand. On 13 May, it was announced Ritchie would write and direct the film Wife & Dog; in November, it was announced the project would star Benedict Cumberbatch, Rosamund Pike, and Anthony Hopkins, with production expected to begin in February 2025.

On 29 May 2024, it was announced that Ritchie would serve as executive producer and director on the Amazon Prime Video television series Young Sherlock, based on the Young Sherlock Holmes series of young adult novels by Andy Lane. On 30 April 2025 it was announced that Ritchie would reunite with Gyllenhaal to direct the sequel to Road House, with Will Beall writing the screenplay; however, in July Ritchie exited the film. On 29 October, it was announced that Ritchie and Statham would reunite on the action thriller Viva La Madness, based on the 2011 novel by J. J. Connolly.

== Filmmaking ==
=== Influences and style ===
Ritchie has cited Quentin Tarantino and Sergio Leone as influences on his work. However, he has stated "just about every film — any good film — that's ever been made has had an influence on me. But then how much of it, I have no idea". He has complimented several films including The Long Good Friday (1980), The Good, the Bad, and the Ugly (1966), Seven Samurai (1954) and Once Upon a Time in the West (1968). When asked about the influence of criminals Ronald and Reginald Kray, Ritchie states "It's inevitable ... everything, more or less, of the old-school villainy related back to the Krays at some point. And the Krays were a lot worse than everyone thinks they are. ... And I know what those boys were doing was a hundred times worse than what everyone thought was going on. So it's inevitable that anything that is genuine, and old, and British will somehow have something to do with the Krays".

Ritchie's films often incorporate memorable and "colourful" characters, for instance, Irish boxer Mickey O'Neil in Snatch, and crime boss "Hatchet" Harry in Lock, Stock, and Two Smoking Barrels. In his crime films, there is also fragmented dialogue, with many characters behaving menacingly and using cockney slang. The portrayal of the British class system has also been explored. Costume designer for The Gentlemen, Michael Wilkinson, said "Each character has an iconic, memorable look — a little larger than life".

Fast-paced and energetic action scenes serve as cinematic choices, as well as placing his characters in combat or violent situations. Ritchie has used fast-cutting and slow motion to build momentum in the story, and to create a high-impact viewing experience, respectively. He is also known to use interweaving stories and a non-linear narrative such as a circular plot in his films; this is found in the case of Lock, Stock, and Two Smoking Barrels, Sherlock Holmes and Snatch.

Ritchie has said this on his creative process:

My creative process has never been something I can put into words. It's very random, very scattered and can sometimes lead down dark alleyways and dead ends. What I will say is I think any director needs to immerse himself in both real life and in history to fully open up creative processes. And you must be prepared for the reality that any creative process worth its salt needs to be revised, reworked and, on occasion, thrown out the window entirely.

Ritchie has worked multiple times with Vinnie Jones, Jason Statham, Jason Flemyng, Alan Ford, Geoff Bell, Mark Strong, Jude Law, Eddie Marsan, Jared Harris, Charlie Hunnam, Josh Hartnett, Hugh Grant, Jake Gyllenhaal, Eiza González, Henry Golding, Cary Elwes, Bugzy Malone and Henry Cavill.

== Personal life ==
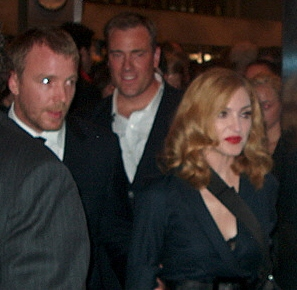
Ritchie with Madonna in 2005

Ritchie started training in Shotokan karate at age seven at the Budokwai in London, where he later achieved a black belt in both Shotokan and Judo. He is also a third degree black belt in Brazilian jiu-jitsu under Renzo Gracie.

In 1997, Ritchie met his older maternal half-brother, Kevin Baynton, for the first time. Baynton had been born in 1959 to Ritchie's mother, Amber Parkinson, when she was an unmarried 17-year-old and was subsequently given up for adoption as an infant. The two met shortly before the production and release of Ritchie's breakthrough film, Lock, Stock and Two Smoking Barrels. While the initial reunion occurred privately in 1997, the broader public and Ritchie's friends were only made aware of Baynton's existence in 2000, when Amber publicly spoke about her eldest son on Esther Rantzen's daytime television talk show.

Kevin's biological father (identity hidden)		Amber Mary Parkinson (mother)		John Vivian Ritchie (father)
	Kevin Baynton (b. 1959); Maternal half-brother		Tabitha Ritchie (b. 1966); Full sister		Guy Stuart Ritchie (b. 1968)

Ritchie says that he can speak Hebrew.

Ritchie met American singer-songwriter Madonna at a dinner party hosted by mutual friends Sting and Trudie Styler in 1998, and they began a relationship. On 18 May 2000, Ritchie was arrested by police for allegedly assaulting a man outside the Kensington home that he shared with Madonna. On 22 December 2000, he married Madonna at Skibo Castle in Scotland. They had a son, Rocco John Ritchie, born in 2000, and adopted a Malawian baby, David Banda, in 2006.

Madonna filed for divorce in October 2008, citing irreconcilable differences. On 15 December 2008, Madonna announced that she had agreed to a divorce settlement with Ritchie, the terms of which granted him £50–60 million, which includes the value of the couple's London pub and Wiltshire estate. The couple issued a joint statement calling settlement reports "misleading and inaccurate". At the Central Family Court in Holborn, district judge Caroline Reid pronounced the decree nisi, which dissolved the marriage within six weeks. Madonna and Ritchie reached a custody agreement for their children.

In February 2011, his London home was briefly occupied by members of the Really Free School, a squatter organisation.

In 2010, Ritchie met English model Jacqui Ainsley. They married on 30 July 2015. The couple have three children.

In July 2020, Ritchie received a six-month driving ban after he was caught by CyclingMikey using a mobile device while operating a motor vehicle.

== Other business ventures ==
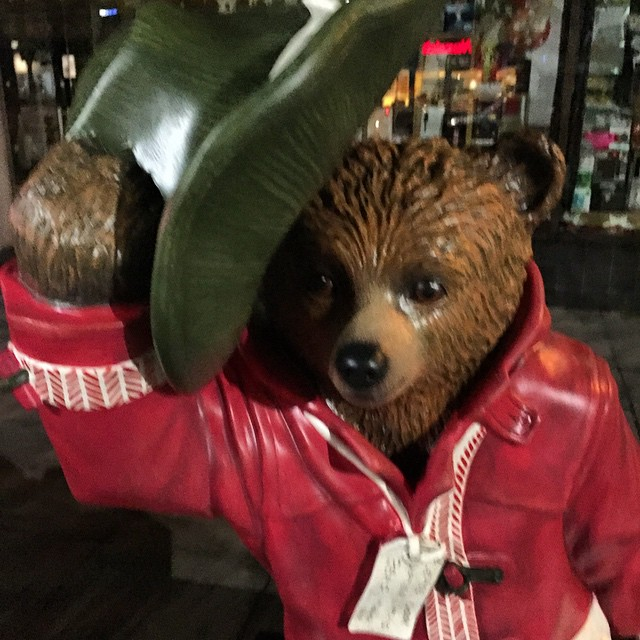
Ritchie designed this Paddington Bear statue for the NSPCC in 2014, a look which was inspired by fashion designer Cecil Beaton (who previously lived at Ritchie's Wiltshire estate).

Ritchie owns a pub, The Lore of the Land, in London, and previously co-owned another, The Walmer Castle with David Beckham until 2022 when it was taken over by Piers Adams, a French entrepreneur. Ritchie owns a small brewing company, Gritchie Brewing Company which brews beer on his Ashcombe Estate in Wiltshire.

He also owns The Wild Kitchen, a firm producing outdoor cooking equipment and tents, which launched at Chelsea Flower Show in 2021.

In October 2022 it was announced that Compton Abbas Airfield was being sold to Ritchie, who owns the neighbouring Ashcombe Estate. Ritchie took over running of the airfield in February 2023.

Ritchie became a comic writer from 2007 to 2008 with the release of the Virgin Comics series Guy Ritchie's Gamekeeper.

== Filmography ==
=== Feature films ===
Year	Title	Director	Writer	Producer	Notes
1998	Lock, Stock and Two Smoking Barrels	Yes	Yes	No	Also casting director
2000	Snatch	Yes	Yes	No	
2002	Swept Away	Yes	Yes	No	
2005	Revolver	Yes	Yes	No	
2008	RocknRolla	Yes	Yes	Yes	
2009	Sherlock Holmes	Yes	No	No	
2011	Sherlock Holmes: A Game of Shadows	Yes	No	No	
2015	The Man from U.N.C.L.E.	Yes	Yes	Yes	
2017	King Arthur: Legend of the Sword	Yes	Yes	Yes	
2019	Aladdin	Yes	Yes	No	
2019	The Gentlemen	Yes	Yes	Yes	
2021	Wrath of Man	Yes	Yes	Yes	
2023	Operation Fortune: Ruse de Guerre	Yes	Yes	Yes	
2023	Guy Ritchie's The Covenant	Yes	Yes	Yes	
2024	The Ministry of Ungentlemanly Warfare	Yes	Yes	Yes	
2025	Fountain of Youth	Yes	No	Yes	
2026	In the Grey	Yes	Yes	Yes	
2027	Wife & Dog	Yes	Yes	Yes	Post-production
2028	Viva La Madness	Yes	Yes	Yes	Post-production

=== Short films ===
Year	Title	Director	Writer	Notes
1995	The Hard Case	Yes	Yes	
2001	The Hire	Yes	Yes	Segment: Star

=== Television ===
Year	Title	Director	Executive producer	Writer	Based on film by	Notes
2000	Lock, Stock...	No	Yes	Yes	Yes	Wrote episode: "...and Four Stolen Hooves"; Based on Ritchie's 1998 film Lock, Stock and Two Smoking Barrels
2017–2018	Snatch	No	No	No	Yes	Based on Ritchie's 2000 film of the same name
2024–present	The Gentlemen	Yes	Yes	Yes	Yes	Directed 5 episodes and wrote 10 episodes Based on Ritchie's 2019 film of the same name
2025–present	MobLand	Yes	Yes	No	No	Directed 4 episodes
2026–present	Young Sherlock	Yes	Yes	No	No	Directed 2 episodes

=== Documentaries ===
Year	Title	Director	Executive producer	Writer	Notes
2025	The Diamond Heist	No	Yes	No	Three-part documentary
TBA	Gracie	No	Yes	No	Documentary series

== See also ==
- Guy Ritchie's unreleased projects
- List of most expensive divorces
