= Ashcombe House, Wiltshire =

Manor house in England

Ashcombe House
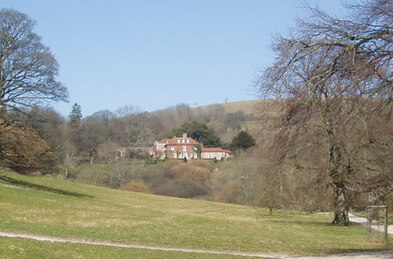

- Location within Wiltshire
- 50°58′49.1″N 2°5′44.9″W
- Location: Cranborne Chase, Wiltshire, England
- OS grid reference: ST93382011

History
- Built for: Robert Barber
- Demolished: 1740, 1870
- Rebuilt: 1740

Site notes
- Architectural style: Georgian
- Owner: Guy Ritchie

Listed Building – Grade II

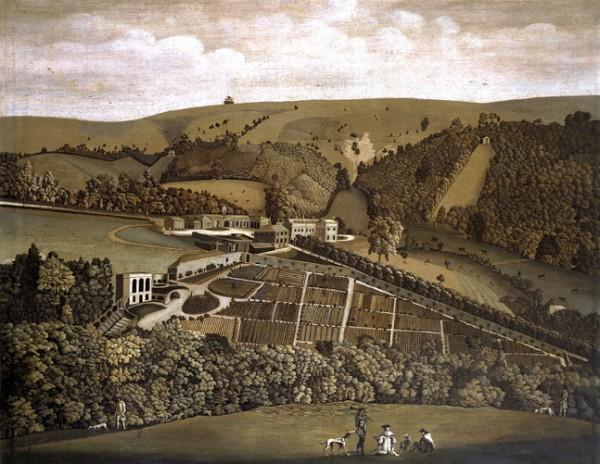
A panoramic view of Ashcombe House, thought to have been painted around 1770 and now in the Salisbury Museum. The present-day house is only a small part of what is shown here, the rest having been demolished.

Ashcombe House, also known as Ashcombe Park, is a Georgian manor house, set in 1,134 acres (4.59 km^{2}) of land on Cranborne Chase in the parish of Berwick St John, near Salisbury, Wiltshire, England. The house is roughly equidistant between the villages of Berwick St John and Tollard Royal. It is listed on the Statutory List of Buildings of Special Architectural or Historic Interest as a Grade II structure.

== Early history ==
There have been several buildings on the site. The first house was built in 1686 by a local squire, Robert Barber. Some fifty years later, in 1740, the Barber family entirely demolished the 1686 house and rebuilt on the site.

In 1750 Anne Wyndham inherited the house. The next year she married the Hon. James Everard Arundell, third son of the 6th Baron Arundell of Wardour. In 1754 the architect Francis Cartwright largely remodelled the interior of the house for the Arundells.

In 1815 the Ashcombe Estate was purchased from Lady Arundell by Thomas Grove the younger of Ferne House for £8,700. Thomas Grove's grandson Sir Walter demolished most of the 1740 house in around 1870. Sir Walter later sold Ashcombe House to the 13th Duke of Hamilton, who in turn sold Ashcombe to Mr R. W. Borley of Shaftesbury after World War I.

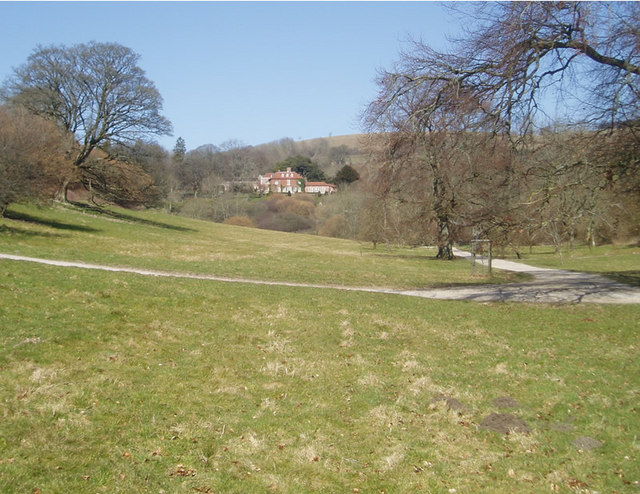
Ashcombe House and grounds in 2006

The current Ashcombe House was originally part of the much larger mid-eighteenth century structure, and is an L-shaped three-bay survival of the eastern wing. There is a five-bay orangery close to the house.

== The Beaton years ==
The photographer and designer Cecil Beaton first visited the house in 1930, taken there by the sculptor Stephen Tomlin together with the writer Edith Olivier. He was later to write of his first impression of the house, as he approached it through the arch of the gatehouse:

None of us uttered a word as we came under the vaulted ceiling and stood before a small, compact house of lilac-coloured brick. We inhaled sensuously the strange, haunting – and rather haunted – atmosphere of the place ... I was almost numbed by my first encounter with the house. It was as if I had been touched on the head by some magic wand.

That same year Mr Borley leased Ashcombe House to Beaton for £50 a year, a very small rent, on the condition that Beaton would make improvements to the house, which was all but derelict. Beaton employed the Austrian architect Michael Rosenauer to make substantial alterations to the material of the house, including a passageway through the house to unite the front and the back, and elongating the windows. Plumbing and electricity were installed. The artist Rex Whistler designed the Palladian front door surround, with its pineapple made from Bath stone. Urns were positioned on the roof and the orangery was converted into Beaton's studio.

Beaton entertained lavishly at Ashcombe House, and his houseguests included many notable people of the time, including actors and artists such as Tallulah Bankhead, Lady Diana Cooper, Ruth Ford and Lord Berners. Artists Whistler, Salvador Dalí, Christian Bérard, Jack von Reppert-Bismarck and Augustus John and stage designer Oliver Messel painted murals in the house, and Dalí used it as the backdrop of one of his paintings. Little remains of the Beaton-era interior design, although in the "circus room", which once contained a Whister-designed bed shaped like a carousel, one mural (by Elsa 'Jack' von Reppert-Bismarck) of a lady on a circus horse remains, painted during a hectic weekend party when all guests wielded paintbrushes.

Beaton's lease expired in 1945, and he was heartbroken to be forced to leave the house: his biographer Hugo Vickers has stated that Beaton never got over the loss of Ashcombe. Beaton detailed his life at the house in his book Ashcombe: The Story of a Fifteen-Year Lease, first published in 1949 by B. T. Batsford. The dustjacket of the first edition of the book featured a painting by Whistler, with the orangery on the left of the painting (on the back cover) and Ashcombe House itself to the right, on the front cover; this image has been reproduced on the cover of the 1999 publication of the book.

In 1948 Beaton designed a fabric, which is still available, which he named "Ashcombe Stripe" after Ashcombe House.

Right up until his death in 1980, Beaton owned a late eighteenth-century painting of the house, thought to have been painted around 1770. It is now held at the Salisbury Museum, having been bought at an auction sale of Beaton's collections.

Beaton's landlord, Hugh Borley, R. W. Borley's son, lived in the house from 1946 until his death in 1993. He grew increasingly eccentric and resented the fame which Beaton's book had brought to the house, refusing all offers to sell it and chasing off sightseers with dogs or threatening them with guns.

An exhibition titled Cecil Beaton at Home: Ashcombe and Reddish, curated by Andrew Ginger, director of the Cecil Beaton Fabrics Collection, was shown at Salisbury Museum from May to September 2014.

== Recent years ==
Shortly before Borley's death, the house was sold in a private sale to David and Toni Parkes, who set about restoring the house. They were friends of the director of the Dovecote Press, which republished Beaton's book on Ashcombe on its fiftieth anniversary in 1999, and so a launch party was held at the house. When the house came up for sale in 2001, the first time it had been on the open market since just after World War I, there was a great deal of interest. Madonna and Guy Ritchie were the successful purchasers, after they were told by Hugo Vickers, Beaton's biographer, of its being up for sale. Like Beaton, the couple were struck by their first encounter with the house:

"We just fell in love with it," Madonna explains. "In the summertime it's the most beautiful place in the world." The memory of their day at Ashcombe "just stayed with us, haunted us for a really long time," she remembers.

Subsequent building work at the house included a large extension, roof alterations and conversion; and in 2008 a planning application for a swimming pool at the house was approved. In May 2008 it was reported that the couple was considering selling the house; in October 2008 with the news of the couple's impending divorce it was stated that Ritchie would receive the estate as part of the divorce settlement. On 3 March 2009, planning permission was granted to Ritchie by Salisbury District Council for the creation of a sporting lake on the estate, to be situated on land to the northwest of Lower Ashgrove Farm.

The grounds of the house are noted for their re-established wildlife, including fallow deer. The grounds are also noted as one of the top game bird shooting venues in the country: The Field magazine voted it one of the UK's ten top venues for pheasant shooting.

Public rights of way run through the grounds, and are open to the public all year round. The grounds contain a 17th-century Quaker burial ground which was still in use in 2004.
