= J. J. Connolly =

British writer

- Born: London, England
- Occupation: Author
- Period: 2000–present
- Genre: Crime fiction
- Notable works: Layer Cake

Website
- jjconnolly.com

J. J. Connolly is an English novelist. He is known for writing the crime novel Layer Cake (2000), which he also adapted into a hit 2004 film of the same name. Connolly wrote a follow up novel, Viva La Madness, and similarly wrote the screenplay for its upcoming film adaptation.

== Early life ==
Connolly was born in North London, the son of Irish parents.

== Novels ==
His first novel, Layer Cake, was first published in 2000 by Duckworth Press. The book takes place in nineties London and is narrated by an unnamed, 29-year-old drug dealer ("If you knew my name, you'd be as clever as me") who plans on leaving the crime game behind at the age of thirty to live life as "a gentleman of leisure." His retirement plan, however, is made complicated by a large shipment of stolen ecstasy, the Serbian war-criminals who want it back and revenge on anyone they hold responsible for the theft, the unpredictable and often outrageous personalities of his friends, and his boss, kingpin Jimmy Price, who has charged him with the task of recovering the missing daughter of a wealthy socialite. He described the novel as a reflection of experiences told to him; he described himself as "an end-user, a punter."

His second novel, Viva La Madness was published in 2011, and resumes after the first, in which only two characters remain: the unnamed narrator and his partner in crime, Mister Mortimer, AKA Morty. It begins in the Caribbean with Morty attempting to recruit the reluctant narrator back to London and the crime business as a super-salesman and closer for a UK syndicate.

== Adaptations ==
In 2004, Layer Cake was adapted into a feature film directed by Matthew Vaughn, starring Daniel Craig. Connolly wrote the screenplay for the film. He wanted to portray the character Lucky in the film, but ultimately did not.

In 2013, it was reported that Connolly was adapting his second novel, Viva La Madness into a film, in which actor Jason Statham is going to star, rather than Daniel Craig. In 2015, it was announced that the novel would be adapted as a television series, but nothing came from it. After a production hiatus, the film adaptation began filming in January 2026, starring Jason Stratham and Vinnie Jones, and directed by Guy Ritchie.
