= Jack von Reppert-Bismarck =

German painter

Elsa 'Jack' von Reppert-Bismarck, (1903 - 1971), was a painter ('neuen deutschen Frau' and kunstmalerin).

Jack von Reppert-Bismarck, photograph by Rolf Mahrenholz, as seen in Vanity Fair, October 1, 1931. Photograph might date from 1929.

She was born Elisabeth Meyer, in Berlin on 10 February 1903 and died at Herkenrath near Cologne on 21 July 1971.

Von Reppert became a bit of an 'it' girl celebrity, as shown by the coverage given her by Weimar Republic era magazines such as Die Dame, Das Leben and UHU in the late 1920s. Subsequently, and concurrently she went to New York and England.

== New York ==
The Balzac Galleries, on 449 Park Avenue, 102 East 57 Street, held an exhibition of her paintings from February 10 to 28 February 1931.

One report on 22 Feb 1931 read: At the Balzac galleries a lady who calls herself Jack von Reppert-Bismarck, holds forth with a large show of paintings and drawings... In the current exhibition at the Balzac Galleries the face of a fat clown. the red ears of the blue frocked barker of the Cirque d'hiver, the rush of white horses, the stab of an out-thrust hand are set down with swift singing color and an unswerving line.

TIME: Monday, February 23, 1931, continued: Last week at New York's Balzac Galleries, Frau Jack von Reppert-Bismarck was heralded as a great-granddaughter-in-law of the Iron Chancellor's cousin, and also as Germany's Marie Laurencin. The comparison with Laurencin is superficially apt. Both artists, charming personally, paint delicate, decadent little girls. With extreme freedom of line, the work of both is eminently suitable for arty magazines. Both have the trick of inserting self portraits in most of their pictures. But Marie Laurencin is 45, red haired, very much a woman of the world, served a long painstaking art apprenticeship before her paintings caught the public fancy. Jack von Reppert-Bismarck is bashful, blonde and 22 [28], looks about 15, and is something of a child prodigy.

== Reppert-Bismarck and Beaton ==
During the Friday to Monday (weekend) of May 29, 1932, Cecil Beaton, whom Jack had met in New York, on the wet Sunday set his house party the task of decorating his bedroom. Beaton wrote that the 'room was to be painted in garish colours with niches filled with circus performers, with baroque emblems, barley-sugar poles and flowered mirrors'.

Rex Whistler, Jack and her husband Jörg (Yorck) von Reppert-Bismarck, Oliver Messel, Lord Berners, Christopher Sykes and Beaton himself set to. Jack's piece, the equestrienne, is almost the only element to survive. Siegfried Sassoon and Edith Olivier were also of the party but did not join in the painting.

Beaton's description of the transformation of his bedroom into a circus-room ends thus:

'Mme von Bismarck pictured an equestrienne on a flower-dappled circus pony, and her husband decided to portray 'the strong man of the Fair' with volute mustachios, tattoo marks, heavy ball-weights and chains. However, Yorck Bismarck eschewed the traditional circus manner of carefully finished realistic painting for the more modern slapdash strokes of the brush, and the next weekend, Rex Whistler could not resist touching up the flowing chevelure and mustachios, the better to conform with the other murals. 'Please don't, Rex' I pleaded. 'There'll be hell to pay if Yorck ever discovered you've touched the thing'. But the temptation was too great. Rex was unable to resist repainting, meticulously and realistically, the crisply waving hair, the mustachios, then of course, the column-like throat, the brawny chest, and so on down the whole over-muscular body. Unfortunately, it so happened that the Bismarcks drove over from Biddesden [ home to Bryan Guinness ] the following Sunday to admire their handiwork. Although my strong man had been made into a work of art, the Bismarck's were enraged at the indignity committed upon the 'strong man', and a nasty situation was created in the artistic world of which reverberations were heard for many weeks to come.'

== Some works ==
- Drawings for Für Liebende by Jeanne Ramel-Cals, Kindt & Bucher, Gießen, 1931;
- Lillian Gish, 1931, drawing, pastel on paper, (26" x 19"), National Portrait Gallery, Smithsonian Institution; gift of the Estate of Lillian Gish. NPG.95.191;
- Portrait of Cecil Beaton, as shown in New York in Vogue, April 15, 1932;
- Boys Smoking, 1931, gift of the Balzac Galleries, New York, 1931 to the Detroit Institute of the Arts, (Bulletin of the Detroit Institute of the Arts, February 1932, XIII, vol. 5, page 61). Pen and black ink and watercolor on cream wove paper. Sheet: 7 3/4 × 5 1/2 inches; Accession number: 31.57;
- Circus Room mural, figure on an horse, equestrienne, Ashcombe House, Wiltshire, May 1932;
- Cover drawing for Lyrische Novelle by Annemarie Schwarzenbach, Berlin, Rowohlt Verlag, 1933;
- Portrait of John Julius Norwich, dated 25 February 1933, oil on canvas, 30 x 25 inches, ex. collections: Lady Diana Cooper and Lady Katharine Mary Veronica Farrell (1922-2017).
- Cover and illustrations for Mechtilde Lichnowsky's novel "Kindheit", Berlin, 1934, lettering by George Salter;
- Colour drawings for Sylvia. Eine Erzählung, by Pfeiffer-Belli, Rowohlt, Berlin, 1936;
- Krönungssommer [Coronation Summer], Prinzessin Elisabeth von England, 1937. Painting of Her Majesty hugging Jane or Dookie, one of Queen Elizabeth's corgis, reproduction published in Die Dame, Heft (issue) 10, 64. May 1, 1937.
- Five colour lithographs for Ein Sommernachtstraum. Eine Komödie, by William Shakespeare, Bern Scherz, c.1950;
- Five lithographs for Iwan Turgenjew's Erste Liebe, Berne, 1958.

== Marriage ==
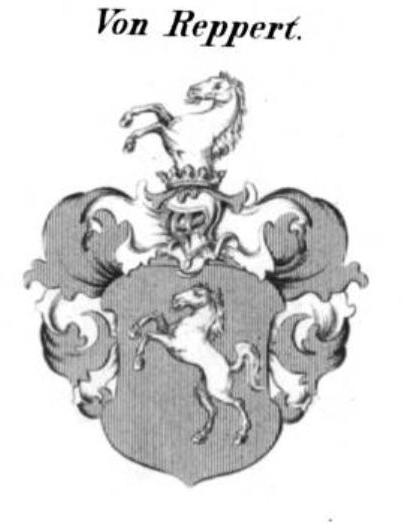
Wappen der Familie Reppert

Hans Jörg von Reppert-Bismark's illustration of Estonczyk 6th Cossack (later Kosakenregiment 360) regiment commander Major Ewert von Renteln (1893-1947), Signal (magazine), 1943.

Elsa married the painter (kunstmaler) Hans Jörg Yorck Friederich Karl Bernhard von Reppert-Bismark (1902-1962) in Berlin on 9 January 1926. Jörg von Reppert-Bismarck illustrated Edward James's Reading Into the Picture, (published by Duckworth), 1934.

During WW2 he was an Axis war artist covering at least a unit of Cossacks with in the Wehrmacht in the East, as seen both German and Italian versions of the Wehrmacht magazine Signal, 1943 (number 21).

== Sources and References ==
- Adels Handbuch, Adelige Hauser, B, Band III, page 392;
- Die Dame 20, 1928, photo by Rolf Mahrenholz;
- UHU

May 1929, (year 5 number 8, '*UHU* Das Monats-Magazine'), page 1, Die Malerin Jack von Reppert-Bismarck, portrait (aufnahme) by Rolf Mahrenholz (1902-1991));
9.1932/33, H.5, February, pages 81-82, drawings for Helene Eliat's short story Eine Frau erzählt die Schöpfungsgeschichte des Manners;
neue monats hefte, Heft 7, Juli, 1934, front cover designed by Jack;

- TIME, Monday, February 23, 1931;
- Vogue, New York, April 1931 (included photo by Cecil Beaton);
- Vanity Fair, October 1, 1931 (photo by Rolf Mahrenholz);
- Die Dame 24, 1931, photo by Rolf Mahrenholz;
- Das Leben (Weimar German magazine):

9.1931/32, H.11, Mai, page 1, full page portrait photo by Reismann;
10.1932/33, H.12, Juni, page 42, Elsa sailing beim Segeln, photo by Albers, possibly Josef Albers;
10.1932/33, H.4, Oktober, feature, pages 53-55, Zwei Ehepaare - Vier Kameraden [Two couples - four comrades], with her husband Jorg, and Graf York (Count David Yorck von Wartenburg) and his wife Ruth Landshoff, photographs by Hug Block;
11.1933/34, H.4, Oktober, page 5, photo of Elsa painting by Mahrenholz.

- Der Querschnitt

Band-/Heftnummer 10.1930, H.8, August, page 523, illustrating a poem by Deutsch von Alfred Wolfenstein (Alfred Wolfenstein);
9.1929, H.11, November, Die knabin, full page portrait of Elsa/Jack by Mahrenholz;
15.1935, H.12, Dezember, page 571-572; two illustrations for a short story by Salvador Reyes, 'Die Tatowierung...';
15.1935, H.12, Dezember, page 589, portrait of Maria Vogt;
15.1935, H.11, November, page 500, Der Clown, for short story by Beverly Nichols, 'Darf eine Frau';

- Ashcombe: The Story of a Fifteen-Year Lease, by Cecil Beaton, BATSFORD, London, 1949;
- Patricia Gozalbez Cantó, Fotografische Inszenierungen von Weiblichkeit. Massenmediale und künstlerische Frauenbilder der 1920er und 1930er Jahre in Deutschland und Spanien, Transcript Verlag, Reihe Gender Studies, erschienen September 2012, (pages 143-);
- Franz Hessel, Sämtliche Werke in fünf Bänden / Städte und Porträts:, Hamburg, 2013, (page 235-).
- Cecil Beaton's Big Top by Herbert Knights, King's Lynn Civic Society Autumn Newsletter 2014;
- Dunkle Wolken über der Ostsee, by Monika von Reppert-Bismarck (1932-), (her husband's niece), self, 2015;
- Cecil Beaton at Home, An Interior Life, Andrew Ginger, Rizzoli, 2016, pages 62-.
