= Guy Ritchie's unrealized projects =

During his long career, English film director Guy Ritchie has worked on a number of projects which never progressed beyond the pre-production stage under his direction. Some of these productions fell in development hell or were cancelled.

== 2000s ==
=== Gamekeeper ===
In 2007, it was reported that Ritchie had planned on making a film based on his Virgin Comics series Gamekeeper for Warner Bros. and film producer Joel Silver.

=== The Dirty Dozen remake ===
It was also reported in 2007 that Ritchie was working on a remake of the 1967 film The Dirty Dozen. Ritchie confirmed in a 2007 interview: "No, no, I was interested in doing The Dirty Dozen, I was interested in doing it and maybe I’ll still do it."

=== Sgt. Rock ===
In May 2008, producer Joel Silver revealed he was making a film about the DC Comics character Sgt. Rock with Ritchie after the pair worked together on the film RocknRolla (2008). Ritchie worked on Sgt. Rock's script and planned to direct it. In September, Ritchie said it was on hold while he worked on the film Sherlock Holmes (2009). He confirmed that the film would be set in World War II and include the US Army infantry unit Easy Company that is led by Sgt. Rock in the comics. Ritchie expressed interest in casting an unknown actor in the lead role. Silver said they prioritized Sherlock Holmes over Sgt. Rock due to similarities between the latter and Inglourious Basterds (2009). In November 2009, it was reported that Francis Lawrence would be directing Sgt. Rock instead, from a new script by Chad St. John. However, in July 2011, Richie was reported to be working on Sgt. Rock again and was supervising script rewrites that returned to the original World War II setting. Ritchie moved on to other projects when Sgt. Rock fell apart due to apparent "administrative/rights issues".

=== Lobo ===
In 2009, it was reported that Ritchie was to helm a film about the DC Comics character Lobo for Warner Bros. In 2010, film producer Joel Silver confirmed in an interview that Ritchie set aside the Lobo project in favor of Sherlock Holmes: A Game of Shadows (2011). It was reported that Brad Peyton and Michael Bay took over the project after Ritchie left the movie.

== 2010s ==
=== The Cannonball Run remake ===
In February 2011, Guy Ritchie is rumored to direct a remake of the 1981 Burt Reynolds The Cannonball Run. According Badass Digest, Ritchie might direct a remake of the film with George Clooney to play the Reynolds role of J.J. McClure. As of 2026, no further news has been revealed

=== Untitled third Sherlock Holmes film ===
In October 2011, Deadline announced that Drew Pearce had been hired by Warner Bros. to write the screenplay for a third installment of the Sherlock Holmes series starring Robert Downey Jr. and Jude Law. In January 2012, Ritchie confirmed he was returning to direct, and that he hoped to base the film's production in Los Angeles. By December, a year after the previous film, producer Dan Lin referred to a third film as a "high priority" and stated that they had to wait for Downey to finish Iron Man 3 before production could commence. Law stated in November 2013 that despite meeting to discuss the film with Ritchie and Downey earlier in the year, it had yet to receive a greenlight from Warner Bros. In April 2016, Downey announced he was hoping to film the sequel later in the year, with James Coyne announced to be rewriting the screenplay. Filming was eyed to begin that autumn, with producer Joel Silver claiming this could be one of several new sequels. In October, a writer's room consisting of Kieran Fitzgerald, Justin Malen, Nicole Perlman and Gary Whitta was assembled to write the film's screenplay. The film missed it's autumn 2016 filming start, and by August 2017, Geneva Robertson-Dworet was working on the script. In May 2018, Narcos creator Chris Brancato was hired as the new screenwriter for the film, with Ritchie's involvement uncertain as no director was set to direct.

=== The Real RocknRolla ===
In December 2011, Ritchie confirmed that a screenplay had been completed that would serve as a sequel to RocknRolla (2008). The sequel was to have been titled The Real RocknRolla.

=== Treasure Island ===
In 2012, it was reported that Ritchie was to helm a film adaptation of Robert Louis Stevenson's Treasure Island for Warner Bros.

=== Empire Rising ===
It was reported in 2013 that Ritchie was in talks with Warner Bros. to direct a film adaptation of Thomas Kelly's 2006 novel Empire Rising.

=== Aladdin sequel ===
In 2019, Dan Lin expressed interest in developing a sequel to the 2019 film Aladdin and said that Walt Disney Pictures is in early stages of developing a follow-up. The studio hoped to bring back Ritchie to direct, and star Will Smith to reprise his role as the Genie from the previous film, while at the same time telling a story that is "fresh and new". Lin also said that the potential would not serve as a remake to The Return of Jafar, a sequel to the original animated film, with the studio instead "looking at 'where's the best way to go with these characters.'". Lin later said that, if a sequel to Aladdin were to be developed, it would not be a direct adaptation of the animated films The Return of Jafar or Aladdin and the King of Thieves, but that it could borrow elements of them, though he also said that Disney would look at various sources for the sequel's story. On February 12, 2020, Variety confirmed a sequel to Aladdin was in development, with John Gatins and Andrea Berloff set to write the script.

== 2020s ==
=== Hercules remake ===
In 2022, it was reported that Ritchie would direct the live action remake of Disney's Hercules, after having previously made the 2019 Aladdin remake. It was also indicated that original writer David Callaham had exited the project, with producers Joe and Anthony Russo looking for a replacement to work on the screenplay.

=== Road House 2 ===
In April 2025, Ritchie was announced to direct the sequel to the Amazon Studios remake of Road House. In July 2025, he left the project.

== Offers ==
=== Xerxes ===
In 2011, Ritchie offered to direct the film adaptation of Xerxes, Frank Miller's sequel to 300, which eventually went to Noam Murro.
