= Edith Olivier =

English writer

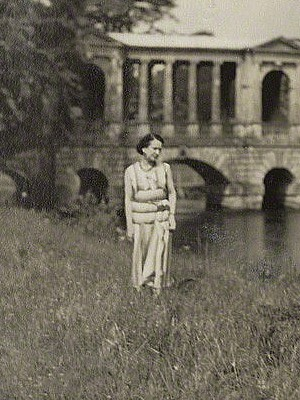
Olivier photographed by Lady Ottoline Morrell in the grounds of Wilton House

Edith Maud Olivier MBE (31 December 1872 – 10 May 1948) was an English writer, also noted for acting as hostess to a circle of well-known writers, artists, and composers in her native Wiltshire.

== Family and childhood ==
Olivier was born in Wilton, of Huguenot stock, her father being Canon of Wilton, and her mother the daughter of a bishop. She was one of ten children. After receiving schooling at home, Olivier went up to St Hugh's College, Oxford, in 1895, but completed only four terms before leaving because of asthma.

She was related to the actor Laurence Olivier through her paternal grandfather, Henry Stephen Olivier, who, through one of his other sons, was the actor's great-grandfather.

== Political and social activity ==
Until his death in 1919 her life was dominated by her father, who was both autocratic and conservative. She was an adherent of the Anglican Church and served on the Women's Diocesan Council. Olivier also undertook activities in the Conservative Party, and Women's Institute. In 1916, at the behest of the Wiltshire county agricultural committee, Olivier helped form the Women's Land Army in Wiltshire, for which she was rewarded in 1920 with an MBE. When she was elected to Wilton Town Council in 1934, she became the first woman to serve on the council, and was later mayor from 1938 to 1941. As mayoress, it was her responsibility to house the children and mothers of babies evacuated from London. Southern Command was based at Wilton, and every bedroom in her house was occupied by a lodger. She describes this in Night Thoughts of a Country Landlady, humorously illustrated by her close friend, the artist Rex Whistler. Her public service during the Second World War included the presidency of the local St John Ambulance Brigade.

== Wilton and Wiltshire ==
Born at Wilton Rectory, Edith grew up playing in and worshipping the neighbouring house and gardens of Wilton House. George Lord Pembroke and his wife, Gety, were childless and encouraged the young Olivier children to spend time with them and to play with their nephews and nieces. When Edith's widower father, Canon Dacres Olivier, retired before the First World War, she and her sister Mildred moved with him to No.20 in Salisbury's Cathedral Close. Her father died the year the war ended, and after a short spell renting at Fitz House, Teffont Magna, the two 40-year-old Olivier sisters moved into the old dairy house (Daye House) on the Wilton estate in 1920. This was at the request of childhood friend Reginald, Lord Pembroke, who had inherited Wilton from his uncle in 1913. Wilton and Wiltshire were her lifelong passions.

“Of all the neighbours on whom I grew to rely more and more, Edith Olivier was perhaps always the most cherished. So many of the young writers, painters and poets came to her with problems about their work and their lives and they knew that after she had listened intently to their outpourings, her advice would be unprejudiced, wise and Christian.” – Cecil Beaton

In her nightly journal – missed only three times: when her brother Harold was killed fighting in 1914, her sister Mildred died from breast cancer in 1923, and her closest friend Rex Whistler was killed jumping from his tank in 1944 – Edith recorded a way of life and a generation that vanished with the outbreak of the Second World War. She describes the 'Bright Young Things' on the Earl of Pembroke's estate at Wilton and at nearby Ashcombe, Cecil Beaton's house, first discovered by Edith. She writes of her close friendships with neighbours Stephen Tennant and his mother, Pamela, wife of Sir Edward Grey; the poet Sir Henry Newbolt; and painters Henry Lamb and Augustus John. Her book on her beloved Wiltshire in the County Books series was published posthumously by her niece, Miss Rosemary Olivier, who continued to live at Daye House at the request of the Pembrokes, and became Mayor of Wilton also.

== Writing and artistic circle ==
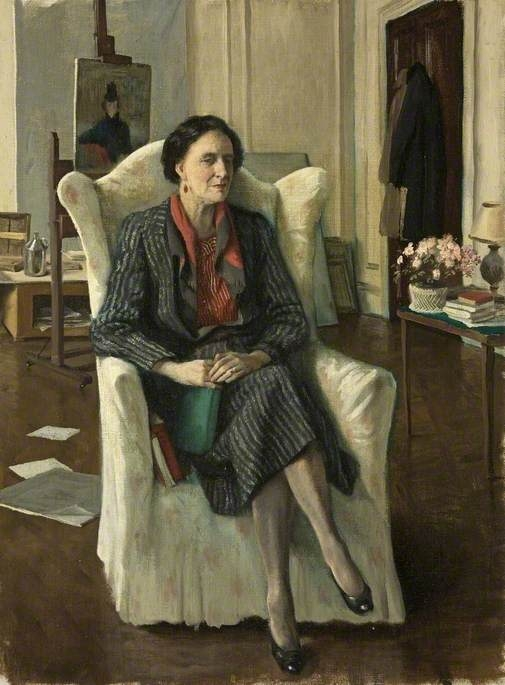
Rex Whistler's 1939 portrait of Olivier

It was after Mildred died in 1923 that she started to engage a broader social circle. It was then that she formed a profound friendship with Rex Whistler and acted as a frequent hostess to an elite, artistic, and social set which included Cecil Beaton, Siegfried Sassoon, William Walton, and Osbert Sitwell. She describes them vividly in her journals:

Cecil Beaton: ‘a marble face and voice’

John Betjeman: ‘cleaner than I expected… loves Georgian churches’

Lady Diana Cooper: ‘I have never seen anyone else really look what I think Helen of Troy must have looked’

Siegfried Sassoon: ‘such fun to tell things to. Laughs so utterly’

Edith Sitwell: ‘bitter against the world in general, and very comprehending towards individuals when she knows about them’

Stephen Tennant: ‘dazzling in his inspired wit and vision’

William Walton: ‘a very domestic man, ready to help in all household emergencies’

Rex Whistler: ‘a reincarnation of Breughel’

Her first novel, The Love-Child, was published in 1927, and was followed by further novels, biographies including one of Alexander Cruden, and the autobiographical Without Knowing Mr Walkley.

== Things Past Explaining ==
In her autobiography Without Knowing Mr Walkley (Walkley was the theatre critic of The Times, and Edith had dreamed of becoming an actress, not a writer), she has a chapter called Things Past Explaining. As she says, "Inexplicable things do happen to me, although I do not call myself 'psychic' as people say".

=== Mystery Tennis Racket ===
One midsummer's night at the Daye House, she woke to hear something thud onto the floor by her bed. It was an old-fashioned tennis racket. She never solved the mystery of its arrival. The windows and door to her room were closed. There was no one in the house. ‘If it was an apport left by a passing spirit, I can only say that the sense of humour of those in another world is very different from ours.′

=== Lost City of Lyonesse ===
Twice, whilst visiting Land's End, she saw a fortified city some miles out in the Atlantic. ‘It was a jumble of towers, domes, spires and battlements.’ On the first occasion, she thought it must be the Scilly Isles, but a passing coastguardsman corrected her and dismissed her as an ‘imbecile.’ She saw the city again when ‘the atmospheric conditions were completely different.’ That day, her driving companion, Miss Macpherson, also saw it and identified it as the lost city of Lyonesse, which she had heard about and always hoped to see. Miss Macpherson felt herself lucky enough to see the city again some years later, but her sister, who was with her, saw nothing.

=== Avebury's Beckhampton Avenue ===
In October 1916, whilst working for the Women's Land Army, Edith stopped at Avebury to watch a fair in the rain. Many years later, she discovered that the last fair had been held there sixty-six years earlier. This prompted her to explore exactly where she had seen the primitive swing boats, coconut shys, and shooting range. She learned that the avenue down which she believed she had driven (from the direction of Beckhampton) had disappeared long before the year 1800. When the excavator Alexander Keiller began searching for this avenue, she did not have the courage to tell him where to start digging.

=== Misses Moberly and Jourdain ===
Edith was a published author when she was asked to write the preface to the 1931 fourth edition of the popular An Adventure by Charlotte Anne Moberly (principal of St Hugh's College, Oxford from its foundation in 1886 until 1915) and her successor, Eleanor Jourdain. In it, the Oxford academics detail with considerable rigour how, on a visit to Versailles in 1901, they believed they had found themselves walking in the Trianon of 1789 and seen Marie-Antoinette. Their account was initially published in 1911 under the pseudonyms Miss Morison and Miss Lamont, in a vain attempt to protect their reputations. Jourdain died in 1924 whilst principal, her demise possibly brought on by the criticism she and Moberly received for daring to involve Oxford University in something so unscientific. For the 1931 edition, and to support Moberly, Edith invited the scientist J.W. Dunne to introduce the account with a note concerning his interest in Serialism (and its fourth dimension) and how this might explain what Moberly and Jourdain had seen. And perhaps what occasionally happened to her.

=== The Bishop's Birds ===
Edith was familiar with the legend that two white birds would be seen flying over Salisbury Cathedral upon the death of a Bishop of Salisbury. Moberly's father had been Bishop of Salisbury, and she had seen two such birds an hour after his death in 1885. She told Edith this when she first arrived at St Hugh's College, having won a scholarship organized by the current bishop of Salisbury. Edith's friends would have been familiar with these stories of the unexplained and suitably infected by her enthusiasm. David Herbert, second son of Reginald, Earl of Pembroke, recalling her funeral, wrote: ‘As they lowered her coffin into the grave, with swish of wings a pigeon flew up into the sky. Cecil [Beaton] and I gasped and in one breath said: “Edith soaring through tracks unknown!”.

== Bibliography ==
=== Novels ===
- The Love-Child (1927)
- As Far As Jane's Grandmother's (1928)
- The Triumphant Footman (1930)
- Dwarf's Blood (1930)
- The Seraphim Room (1932; published in the U.S. as Mr. Chilvester's Daughters)

=== Non-fiction ===
- The Eccentric Life of Alexander Cruden (1934)
- Mary Magdalene (1934)
- Country Moods and Tenses (1941)
- Four Victorian Ladies of Wiltshire (1945)
- Wiltshire (posthumously published 1951)

=== Autobiographical writings and diaries ===
- Without Knowing Mr Walkley (1938)
- Night Thoughts of a Country Landlady (1943)
- Journals (from 1 March 1894 to 22 April 1948)

== Death ==
Olivier died in 1948, after suffering three strokes, and was interred in Wilton churchyard.
