= Layer Cake (film) =

2004 British crime film by Matthew Vaughn

- U.S. theatrical release poster
- Directed by: Matthew Vaughn
- Screenplay by: J. J. Connolly
- Based on: Layer Cake (2000 novel) by J. J. Connolly
- Produced by: Adam Bohling; David Reid; Matthew Vaughn
- Starring: Daniel Craig; Colm Meaney; Sienna Miller; Michael Gambon
- Cinematography: Ben Davis
- Edited by: Jon Harris
- Music by: Lisa Gerrard; Ilan Eshkeri
- Production company: Marv Films
- Distributed by: Columbia Pictures (UK & Ireland; through Columbia TriStar Films (UK)); Sony Pictures Classics (International)
- Release date: 1 October 2004
- Running time: 105 minutes
- Country: United Kingdom
- Language: English
- Budget: $6.5 million
- Box office: $11.9 million

Layer Cake is a 2004 British crime thriller film directed and produced by Matthew Vaughn, in his directorial debut. The screenplay was adapted by J. J. Connolly from his 2000 novel. It stars Daniel Craig as a London-based drug dealer (unnamed in the film and listed in the credits as ‘XXXX’) who wants to leave his criminal life behind. The cast also features Colm Meaney, Kenneth Cranham, George Harris, Jamie Foreman, Sienna Miller, Michael Gambon, Tom Hardy, Ben Whishaw, Burn Gorman, Sally Hawkins and Marcel Iureș. The title refers to the social strata, especially in the British criminal underworld.

Layer Cake was released in the United Kingdom by Columbia Pictures on 1 October 2004. It grossed $11.9 million at the box office and received generally positive reviews from critics. Vaughn was nominated for Most Promising Newcomer at the 58th BAFTA Awards. Craig's performance in the film has often been cited as a major factor in his casting as James Bond in 2005.

== Plot ==
The protagonist, XXXX (otherwise unnamed), is a London cocaine distributor who abhors violence and operates with the care and professionalism of a legitimate businessman. His chief associates are his enforcer and partner Morty, and Gene, an Irish gangster who serves as his liaison to mob boss Jimmy Price. Just as XXXX is ready to retire from criminal life, he is summoned to a lunch meeting with Jimmy, who gives him two tasks.

The first is to track down Charlotte, the drug-addicted runaway daughter of one of Price's associates. XXXX enlists the con men Cody and Tiptoes to find her; they learn that Charlotte has apparently been kidnapped, but are unable to discover who abducted her.

The second task is for XXXX to oversee the purchase of one million ecstasy tablets from the "Duke", a low-level criminal who recently returned to London from Amsterdam with his girlfriend Slasher and crew of thugs led by his right-hand man Gazza. Unbeknownst to XXXX, the Duke and his crew have stolen the pills from a gang of Serbian war criminals. He meets the Duke's feckless nephew, Sidney, and finds himself attracted to his girlfriend Tammy. XXXX tries to broker the sale of the pills to Liverpool gangsters Trevor and Shanks but they refuse, informing him of their origin and that the vengeful Serbians have sent the assassin Dragan to recover the pills and kill the thieves. As the Duke had mentioned his name to the Serbians, XXXX is also a target.

XXXX arranges a tryst with Tammy but is kidnapped and brought to Eddie Temple, a wealthy crime lord. Eddie explains that Charlie is his daughter, whom he has recovered; Jimmy, having recently lost a fortune due to bad investments he blames on Eddie, wanted her as a hostage until Eddie recouped his losses. Eddie gives XXXX a recording, revealing that Jimmy has been working as an informant for Scotland Yard, planning to betray XXXX to the police once the pills were sold in exchange for immunity for his own crimes and XXXX's money. Eddie demands that XXXX sell him the pills instead.

XXXX assassinates Jimmy at his home, but later finds that his accountant, an associate of Jimmy's, has vanished along with XXXX's money. Confronted by Gene and Morty, he shares the evidence of Jimmy's betrayal, and the pair acknowledge him as the new acting boss. Gene shows them the corpse of the Duke, who was killed by one of his men when Slasher threatened to go to the police if Jimmy did not help them out of their situation. XXXX hires hitman Lucky, an associate of Trevor and Shanks, to ambush and kill Dragan, but Dragan kills Lucky first and makes XXXX promise to recover the pills.

Sidney brings XXXX to Duke's old hideout, and, as he tries to bargain with Gazza for the pills, the police arrive. XXXX and the Duke's gang barely escape the raid, while Dragan watches from afar as the pills are confiscated. However, it turns out that XXXX arranged for the raid, with Cody and Tiptoes posing as officers to secure the pills. XXXX delivers the Duke's severed head to Dragan as a peace offering; satisfied, Dragan reports to the Serbians that the police have seized the drugs. The Serbians accept the loss, which is revealed to be a small amount in comparison to their overall manufacturing capacity.

When XXXX and his crew arrive at Eddie's warehouse to sell the pills as arranged, Eddie's henchmen relieve them of the drugs at gunpoint, and Eddie welcomes him to the "layer cake" of criminal hierarchy. Having anticipated this double-cross, XXXX arranges Trevor and Shanks to gun down Eddie's men in an armed robbery, take the drugs, and sell them via Dizzy so he can settle his accounts. The gang assembles for lunch at the Stoke Park Country Club, honouring their new boss, but XXXX declines their offer of leadership and follows up on his initial plan to retire. With Tammy on his arm, he leaves the club, but is shot by a jilted yet apologetic Sidney. He collapses, bleeding out on the steps.

== Cast ==
- Daniel Craig as XXXX
- Colm Meaney as Gene
- George Harris as Morty
- Sienna Miller as Tammy
- Tamer Hassan as Terry
- Jamie Foreman as "The Duke"
- Kenneth Cranham as Jimmy Price
- Michael Gambon as Eddie Temple
- Ben Whishaw as Sidney
- Tom Hardy as Clarkie
- Dexter Fletcher as Cody
- Steve John Shepherd as "Tiptoes"
- Burn Gorman as Gazza
- Sally Hawkins as "Slasher"
- Marcel Iureș as Slavo
- Dragan Mićanović as Dragan
- Louis Emerick as Trevor
- Stephen Walters as "Shanks"
- Paul Orchard as "Lucky"
- Francis Magee as Paul "The Boatman"
- Rab Affleck as Mickey
- Nathalie Lunghi as Charlie Temple
- Jason Flemyng as "Crazy" Larry Flynn
- Marvyn Benoit as Kinky
- Darren Healy and Matt Ryan as Junkies
- Ivan Kaye as Freddie Hurst
- Ben Brazier as "Kilburn" Jerry
- Daniel Moorehead as "Dizzy"
- Neil Finnighan as "Troop"
- Don McCorkindale as Albert Carter

== Production ==
Filming began in June 2003. Queen's Gate Mews in South Kensington, London, was used as the filming location for the home of Daniel Craig's main character. Location shooting also took place in Amsterdam.

== Soundtrack ==
The soundtrack from Layer Cake comprises 14 tracks.

1. "Hayling" – FC Kahuna
2. "Opening" – Ilan Eshkeri and Steve McLaughlin
3. "She Sells Sanctuary" – The Cult
4. "Can't Get You Out of My Head" (Original Radio Edit) – Kylie Minogue
5. "You Got the Love" (Original bootleg radio mix) – The Source feat. Candi Staton
6. "Drive to the Boatyard" – Ilan Eshkeri
7. "Junky Fight" – Lisa Gerrard
8. "Making Plans for Nigel" – XTC
9. "Ordinary World" – Duran Duran
10. "Ruthless Gravity" – Craig Armstrong
11. "Four to the Floor" (Soulsavers Mix) – Starsailor
12. "Drive to the Warehouse" – Ilan Eshkeri and Lisa Gerrard
13. "Aria" (Layer Cake Speech) – Lisa Gerrard with Michael Gambon
14. "Don't Let Me Be Misunderstood" – Joe Cocker

The Rolling Stones song "Gimme Shelter" also features in the film but does not appear on the soundtrack album.

== Release ==
=== Theatrical ===
Layer Cake first released theatrically on 1 October 2004 in the United Kingdom. Later, it released theatrically in North America on 13 May 2005.

=== Home media ===
Layer Cake was released on DVD and VHS on 23 August 2005 and on Blu-ray in 2007. It was also re-released in 2014.

== Reception ==
=== Box office ===
Film	Release date		Box office revenue			Box office ranking		Budget	Ref.
Film	Worldwide	United States	United States	International	Worldwide	All time United States	All time worldwide	Budget	Ref.
Layer Cake	May 2005	May 2005	$2,339,957	$9,510,257	$11,850,214	#5,288	Unknown	$6.5 million	

=== Critical response ===
Layer Cake received positive reviews, with an 81% rating on Rotten Tomatoes and an average of 7.1/10 based on 142 reviews. The critical consensus states that it is "A stylized, electric British crime thriller". On Metacritic it has a weighted average score of 73 out of 100 based on 30 reviews.

Roger Ebert of the Chicago Sun-Times remarked, "The movie was directed by Matthew Vaughn, who produced Lock, Stock and Two Smoking Barrels and Snatch, and this one works better than those films because it doesn't try so hard to be clever and tries harder to be menacing". Of Craig's performance, he said, "Craig is fascinating here as a criminal who is very smart, and finds that it is not an advantage because while you might be able to figure out what another smart person is about to do, dumbos like the men he works for are likely to do anything". He gave the film 3.5 out of 4 stars. Mick LaSalle of the San Francisco Chronicle remarked on the "efficient, gripping story" and wrote that Craig's performance as an improvising, "intelligent amateur" contained the "cool-yet-humble vibe of Steve McQueen". Owen Gleiberman of Entertainment Weekly gave it a grade A, calling it a "Fast, convulsive, and densely exciting new British gangster thriller". Leslie Felperin of Variety wrote: "There's a proper lived-in believability about Layer Cake's depiction of how the worlds of the rich, the criminal and the criminally rich intersect."

=== Accolades ===
Award	Category	Recipient	Result	Ref.
BAFTA Awards	Most Promising Newcomer	Matthew Vaughn	Nominated	
British Independent Film Awards	Douglas Hickox Award	Matthew Vaughn	Nominated	
Empire Awards	Best British Film	Layer Cake	Nominated	
Empire Awards	Best British Actor	Daniel Craig	Nominated	
Empire Awards	Best Newcomer	Sienna Miller	Nominated	
Empire Awards	Best British Director	Matthew Vaughn	Won	
European Film Awards	People's Choice Award for Best Actor	Daniel Craig	Nominated	
National Board of Review Awards	Special recognition for excellence in filmmaking	Layer Cake	Won	

== Follow-up ==
Connolly wrote a follow up novel to Layer Cake entitled Viva La Madness In 2013, Connolly was announced to be involved in the production of an adaptation, with Jason Statham taking over from Daniel Craig. On 17 September 2015, it was reported that Viva La Madness will be a TV show for Gaumont International Television. In 2026, Viva La Madness was announced to be in production with Guy Ritchie directing and co-writing alongside Connolly. The film will reportedly have no direct connections to the 2004 film Layer Cake.

== Legacy ==
Craig's starring role in the film has been cited as the performance that led to his high-profile casting as James Bond.
