= Adrian Hennigan =

British film critic

Adrian Hennigan is a British film critic. He is best known for his work with the BBC and Popcorn.net as a film reviewer. He lives in Israel and writes for Haaretz, serving as the television critic for the paper's English-language edition.
