= Layer Cake (novel) =

Novel by J. J. Connolly

- Author: J. J. Connolly
- Language: English
- Genre: Crime novel
- Publisher: Duckworth Press
- Publication date: 6 April 2000
- Publication place: England
- Media type: Print (hardback and paperback)
- Pages: 240 pp (first edition, paperback)
- ISBN: 0-7156-3018-0 (first edition, paperback)
- OCLC: 42791632

Layer Cake is a fictional novel and work of crime fiction. Layer Cake was the debut novel of British author J. J. Connolly. The novel was first published in April, 2000 by Duckworth Press. A film adaptation of the novel, also called Layer Cake, was released in 2004, directed by Matthew Vaughn and written for the screen by the novel's author, J. J. Connolly. A tie-in book edition was published in 2004. An audiobook was released in January, 2006. The first ebook version was released in December, 2007 with the first official Kindle ebook release in January, 2011.

== Summary ==
The book takes place in London in the 1990s and is narrated by an unnamed, 29-year-old drug dealer ("If you knew my name, you'd be as clever as me") who plans on leaving the life of crime behind at the age of thirty to live life as "a gentleman of leisure." His retirement plan is complicated by a large shipment of stolen ecstasy, the German neo-Nazis who want the drugs back and revenge on anyone they hold responsible for the theft, the unpredictable and often outrageous personalities of his friends, and his boss, kingpin Jimmy Price, who charges him with the task of recovering the missing daughter of a wealthy socialite.

== Plot ==
On April Fools' Day in 1997, the narrator and his pal Mister Mortimer are waiting impatiently to sell a half-kilo of cocaine to a less-than-punctual pal, Jeremy. While awaiting Jeremy's arrival, readers are introduced to various characters and are given a brief look into their histories. We are introduced to Jimmy Price; Mister Mortimer (Morty), who served five and a quarter years of an eight-year sentence for being caught while disposing of suicide victim Kilburn Jerry after a party; young Clarkie, whom the narrator expects to take his place when he retires; and Terry, 'friend to all'. The narrator also explains to the readers how he made it to where he is—starting small, growing in rank, keeping quiet and making sure everything is strictly business. Jeremy eventually arrives half an hour late to make the purchase.

Narrator is invited to Mortimer's porn shop, Loveland, and interrupts an argument between Mort and an employee, Nobby, who is confused on what to do over a shipment from the Netherlands of low-quality sex gear that they did not order. They decide to send it back. Mort then drives the narrator to a fancy, out-of-the-way restaurant called Pepi's Barn, the haunt of "don" Jimmy Price, who has demanded to meet with him. Here the reader is introduced to Jimmy's right-hand man Gene, a loyal gundog to boot. The purpose of the dinner, as it turns out, is the disappearance of a young girl name of Charlotte Temple. Charlotte (aka Charlie) is the daughter of Edward Temple, a wealthy business contractor and socialite whom Price has known since childhood. She has run away with her new boyfriend, a cokehead by the name of Trevor Atkins, alias Kinky. Price charges the narrator with the task of locating Charlotte as a favour to Jimmy's pal, and promises that if he is successful, Price will allow him to retire without fuss.

Price also tells the narrator about a crew of gangsters who have recently acquired two million high quality Ecstasy pills from Amsterdam. Price tasks the narrator with finding a buyer for the pills, and quickly. During the meeting with the gangsters, collectively known as the "Yahoos," the narrator finds that he cannot reason with them, and he leaves upon promising to find a buyer for the pills, albeit at a much lower price than if the Yahoos would consent to releasing the pills in small instalments. The narrator tells the Yahoos that the pills are worth much less than they believe, which they are not happy to hear.

The narrator tasks his old friend Cody, also known as Billy Bogus and his partner Tiptoes with locating Charlie. Cody expects little difficulty and quickly accepts the job. While looking for Cody in a London club, the narrator encounters Sidney, a low-ranking member of the Yahoos. The narrator then meets Sidney's girlfriend Tammy, to whom he is immediately attracted. Before leaving the club, Tammy gives him her number and surreptitiously asks him to call her. While speaking with Sidney, the narrator hears a story about the leader of Sidney's crew, a man named Darren who prefers to be known as The Duke. The Duke and his girlfriend, Slasher, are a pair of dedicated coke addicts who live just outside London. The pair of them have become steadily more paranoid due to their cocaine use, and this paranoia leads Slasher to attack a member of the local council with pepper spray when he visits their home. Slasher also manages to kill one of the Duke's prized Dobermans, Mike Tyson, by shooting it. Sidney thinks the story is hilarious, but the narrator panics upon realising that the Duke probably had his number along with Mister Mortimer's, and the police could very well have information on them now.

The narrator sets about finding a buyer for the ecstasy pills, and he, Mortimer and Clarkie go to Liverpool to meet with Trevor and Shanks, two powerful North England drug dealers. Upon their arrival, Shanks tells the narrator and his colleagues that the Yahoos have in fact stolen the pills from a neo-Nazi outfit in Amsterdam, and they used the narrator and Mortimers' names to gain credibility. Shanks tells the narrator that the Germans have unleashed an assassin named Klaus to recover the pills and eliminate the thieves. Unfortunately for the narrator, Klaus believes that he was the one who initiated the robbery. The meeting ends and Trevor invites the narrator to come to dinner at his house. The narrator has a nightmare involving Jimmy Price and awakes to a television news story about the brutal torture and murder of a boatman named Van Tuck. At Trevor's house, Trevor and the narrator are discussing the state of the drugs game when the narrator offhandedly mentions Van Tuck's murder. Trevor flies into a panic and takes the narrator to see Duncan, a local reporter who is friendly with many police officers and feeds Trevor information. On the way, Trevor explains that Van Tuck was a smuggler and he was currently moving several million pounds' worth of marijuana into the country for Trevor. Trevor's hope is that Van Tuck had not yet picked up the shipment, but there is a strong possibility that the police will have confiscated the drugs during their investigation of Van Tuck's murder. Through Duncan, Trevor discovers that the cannabis has been seized by the police and after destroying many of Duncan's possessions in a rage, the action moves back to London.

The narrator and Morty receive a call from Cody, telling them that he has located Kinky, Charlie's boyfriend, in a flat in King's Cross. Upon arriving at the flat, the men find that Kinky is dead of a heroin overdose, and one of the crackheads who was living with Kinky believes that Kinky was murdered. The narrator is intrigued to learn that Kinky had turned up at the flat shortly before his death with Charlie and two grand in cash. The crackheads tell them that Charlie has gone to Brighton and the narrator sends Cody after her.

The narrator and Morty retire to a café, where they run into Freddy Hurst, a fat and slovenly ex-gangster who is down on his luck. Freddy subtly ridicules Morty and asks for some money. Morty complies, but when Freddy makes another comment, Morty flies into a rage and beats Freddy almost to death in the middle of the crowded café. Morty and the narrator flee, with the narrator deeply troubled by what he has just witnessed. That night, the narrator visits Gene at his flat. Gene goes over the beating in great detail and informs the narrator that if Freddy dies, the narrator is left with two options. He can either testify against Morty or he will go to prison as an accomplice to murder. Gene then goes on to explain that Freddy Hurst was an influential gangster in the late 1970s in London, and that Gene and Morty were members of his crew. After Kilburn Jerry killed himself and Morty was caught disposing of the body, Freddy was about to go away for about 12 years to serve concurrent sentences. Freddy could have gotten Morty off the hook but chose not to, leading to Morty doing 5 years in prison unnecessarily.

The narrator gets very drunk with Gene, and the next day decides to arrange a meeting with Tammy at the Churchill Hotel. While showering at the hotel before Tammy arrives, the narrator is kidnapped by two unidentified men and transported across London to The City. There he meets Eddie Temple, who explains that Jimmy has double-crossed the narrator. Jimmy had become involved in a scheme with some gangsters from Chechnya to purchase a consignment of non-existent Pakistani heroin. Jimmy had been taken in by the gangsters and had lost nearly 13 million pounds. In his rage, Jimmy believed that his old friend Eddie had arranged for Jimmy to be ensnared, and he therefore tasked the narrator to find Charlie, Eddie's daughter. Jimmy believed that if he could hold Charlie hostage, he could force Eddie to get his money back. Eddie goes on to explain that Jimmy has been moonlighting as a police informer for a number of years. Eddie plays the narrator a recording in which Jimmy speaks with Albie Carter, a member of the Southeast Regional Crime Squad. Jimmy tells Albie that he wants the narrator to be arrested for possession of drugs, which would result in a 12-year sentence. Jimmy had sent the narrator to a dodgy accountant, and after the narrator is imprisoned, Jimmy was planning to take control of his assets to recover his lost wealth. Eddie drops the narrator off back at the Churchill with the recording.

The narrator decides to take matters into his own hands and proceeds to Jimmy's mansion in Totteridge. There, he sneaks into the grounds of Price's house and kills him with a gun he borrowed from Gene. The narrator heads back into London, where his colleagues are frantically trying to find out who killed Jimmy. The narrator is convinced that he got away cleanly and is unconcerned. He is summoned with Morty to see Gene, who promptly beats the narrator viciously and breaks his wrist. It transpires that Gene has discovered that the narrator killed Jimmy with the same gun that Gene used to kill Crazy Larry Flynn, a homosexual London gangster who had been friends with both Gene and Morty. Upon producing the recording, the narrator manages to convince Gene and Morty that Jimmy was an informer, and they trust one another again.

The narrator now decides to eliminate both of his remaining problems. One, he has to stop Klaus the murderous Nazi and, two, he has to find a way to steal the pills back from the Yahoos. The narrator and Morty contact Shanks in Liverpool and get him to send an assassin down on the train. The narrator lures Klaus to Primrose Park and lies in wait with the sniper. The narrator spots a tall blonde man in the park and, believing this man to be Klaus, orders the sniper to kill him, which he does. The narrator then realises that they have killed the wrong man and see Klaus run away from the scene. Gene flies into a rage when he hears what has happened, and dispatches some of his own men to find and kill Klaus, which they do.

The narrator then contracts Cody to organise a false police raid on the Yahoos' hideout to steal back the pills. Cody and his team assault the hideout, posing as armed police. They allow the Yahoos to escape and they "confiscate" the pills. Gene and the narrator find the Yahoos in a run-down bar and convince them that the police who raided them were crooked and have taken the pills for themselves. The narrator had previously worked out a deal with Eddie Ryder to give Ryder the pills in return for 2.5 million pounds. Thinking that his job is finally complete, the narrator and his colleagues take the pills to Eddie Temple's bonded warehouse at Heathrow Airport, where Temple is having the pills flown to Tokyo.

When they arrive at the airport, Eddie and his private security team take them all hostage and take the pills. Temple takes the pills, telling the narrator that he is owed them as a result of the narrator causing Charlie distress. Temple then delivers a speech to the narrator, explaining the nature of the drugs game, crime and life in general:

"You're born, you take shit. Get out in the world, you take more shit. Climb a little higher, you take less shit. Until one day you're up in the rarified atmosphere and you've forgotten what shit even looks like. Welcome to the layer cake, son."

Seemingly defeated, the narrator and his colleagues then discover that they have delivered the wrong boxes to Temple. The boxes were actually filled with sex toys and pornography that Morty had been unable to sell at Loveland, the sex shop that he owned. The real pills had been shipped back to Amsterdam and to an unknown fate. Clarkie then tells Morty that had Freddie Hurst has died of his injuries, which could cause serious problems for Morty.

The story then fast-forwards about three years. The narrator is now living on the northern coast of Venezuela where he runs a bar. It turns out that about six weeks after Temple stole the pills, the narrator and Tammy were eating in a restaurant in London when Sidney, Tammy's jilted ex-boyfriend, found them. Sidney shot the narrator multiple times, including in the head. The narrator spent six weeks in a coma and awoke with a steel plate in his head. He is visited in hospital by a mysterious government official, who may work for the police or MI5. The man tells the narrator to abandon the drugs trade and leave Britain or else he would find himself in prison for a very long time. The narrator moves to Venezuela and leaves us with the line, "My name? If you knew that, you'd be as clever as me."

== Film adaptation ==
A 2004 film adaptation of the same name, directed by Matthew Vaughn and starring Daniel Craig, had a largely unchanged storyline and received positive reviews.

== Characters ==
- The Narrator – A highly intelligent 29-year-old drug dealer hoping to pack up his earnings and leave the game to live life as "a gentleman of leisure" when he reaches the age of 30.
- Mister Mortimer – A black ex-convict with a short temper. He is the Narrator's closest friend and one of the reasons why the Narrator has been able to carry on business so long.
- James Lionel Price – Kingpin and drug lord, fancies himself the "don" of northern London's entire drug enterprise.
- Gene – Jimmy Price's loyal gundog.
- Edward Temple – A business contractor and wealthy socialite. Reluctant buddy of Jimmy Price.
- Charlotte Temple – Edward's uncontrollable, run-away daughter.
- Trevor Atkins (aka Kinky) – Charlotte's boyfriend. A cocaine addict.
- The Duke – A flashy and careless gangster who steals a large shipment of ecstasy pills.
- Sidney – Old friend and errand boy of the duke.
- Tammy – Sidney's pseudo-girlfriend and the Narrator's love interest.
- Clarkie – Narrator's protégé, who is also a member of one of London's leading crime families. Narrator takes Clarkie on as a protégé, partly out of favour and respect for Clarkie's family.
- Terry – Morty's protégé. As Clarkie is the future "brains" of the operation, Terry is the future "muscle" of the operation.
- Klaus – A sadistic German bent on retrieving the Ecstasy pills stolen by the Duke and his team.
- Freddie Hurst – An annoying, obese figure from Morty's past. Also, one of the primary reasons for Morty's incarceration.
- Cody Garret (alias Billy Bogus) – An old childhood friend of Narrator. He is an exceptional con-man, with a knack for mimicry and impersonation.
- Nobby – Employee of Loveland, Morty's sex shop front.
- Mister Troop – Ex-military, head bodyguard of Edward Temple.
- Lawrence Francis Gower (alias 'Crazy' Larry Flynn) – A crazed homosexual gangster who was friends with Gene and Morty. Gene was forced to kill him after Larry went "overboard" and started strangling rent boys
- Albie Carter – Jimmy Price's connection with the Regional Crime Squad.

== Audiobook ==
An audiobook of "Layer Cake' was released on January 22, 2006. Lasting 13 hours and 15 minutes, the unabridged 2000 novel was read by Paul Thornley. It was published and released by Recorded Books Inc.
