= List of metafictional works =

This is a partial list of works that use metafictional ideas. Metafiction is intentional allusion or reference to a work's fictional nature. It is commonly used for humorous or parodic effect, and has appeared in a wide range of mediums, including writing, film, theatre, and video gaming.

== Novels, novellas and short stories ==
=== Pre-20th century works ===
- Thomas Carlyle, Sartor Resartus
- Kim Man-jung, The Cloud Dream of the Nine
- Cao Xueqin, Dream of the Red Chamber
- Miguel de Cervantes, Don Quixote
- Geoffrey Chaucer, The Canterbury Tales
- James Hogg, The Private Memoirs and Confessions of a Justified Sinner
- Laurence Sterne, The Life and Opinions of Tristram Shandy, Gentleman
- William Makepeace Thackeray, Vanity Fair
- Machado de Assis, The Posthumous Memoirs of Brás Cubas

=== Modern and contemporary works ===
- Peter Ackroyd, English Music
- Rabih Alameddine, I, the Divine
- Brian Aldiss, Report on Probability A
- Felipe Alfau, Locos: A Comedy of Gestures
- Martin Amis, Money, London Fields, Time's Arrow, The Information
- Isaac Asimov, Murder at the ABA
- Margaret Atwood, The Handmaid's Tale, The Testaments
- Paul Auster, The New York Trilogy: City of Glass (1985), Ghosts (1986) and The Locked Room (1986)
- Nicholson Baker, The Mezzanine
- John Barnes, One for the Morning Glory
- Julian Barnes, Flaubert's Parrot
- John Barth, Chimera; Coming Soon!!!; The Floating Opera; The Sot-Weed Factor; Lost in the Funhouse
- Peter S. Beagle, The Last Unicorn
- Samuel Beckett, Watt
- Thomas Bernhard, Wittgenstein's Nephew
- Laurent Binet, HHhH
- Roberto Bolaño, The Savage Detectives, 2666
- Jorge Luis Borges, "The Garden of Forking Paths"; "Tlön, Uqbar, Orbis Tertius"; "Pierre Menard, Author of the Quixote"
- George Bowering, Burning Water
- Steven Brust and collaborators, Five Hundred Years After
- William S. Burroughs, Naked Lunch
- Michel Butor, Second Thoughts
- A. S. Byatt, Possession: A Romance
- James Branch Cabell, The Cream of the Jest
- Guillermo Cabrera Infante, Tres tristes tigres
- Italo Calvino, If on a winter's night a traveler
- Peter Carey, Illywhacker
- Jonathan Carroll, The Land of Laughs
- J. M. Coetzee, Slow Man
- Douglas Cooper, Amnesia, Delirium
- Julio Cortázar, Hopscotch
- Douglas Coupland, jPod
- John Crowley, Little, Big, Novelty, Lord Byron's Novel: The Evening Land, The Solitudes
- Mark Z. Danielewski, House of Leaves
- Lydia Davis, The End of the Story
- Peter David, Young Justice, Sir Apropos of Nothing
- Samuel R. Delany, The Einstein Intersection; Dhalgren
- Philip K. Dick, VALIS; The Man in the High Castle
- Hernan Diaz, Trust (novel)
- Joan Didion, Democracy; The Last Thing He Wanted
- Umberto Eco, Foucault's Pendulum; The Island of the Day Before; The Name of the Rose
- Jennifer Egan, The Keep
- Dave Eggers, A Heartbreaking Work of Staggering Genius
- Bret Easton Ellis, Lunar Park; Imperial Bedrooms; The Shards
- Harlan Ellison, "The Deathbird"
- Michael Ende, The Neverending Story
- Steve Erickson, Arc d'X; The Sea Came in at Midnight
- Steven Erikson, Dust of Dreams; Crack'd Pot Trail
- Raymond Federman, Twofold Vibration; Smiles on Washington Square; Take It Or Leave It
- Jasper Fforde, The Eyre Affair; Lost in a Good Book; The Well of Lost Plots; Something Rotten; The Big Over Easy; The Fourth Bear
- Jonathan Safran Foer, Everything Is Illuminated
- Ford Madox Ford, The Good Soldier
- John Fowles, The French Lieutenant's Woman, The Magus
- Jostein Gaarder, Sophie's World
- Gabriel García Márquez, One Hundred Years of Solitude
- John Gardner, October Light; Grendel
- William H. Gass, The Tunnel
- André Gide, The Counterfeiters
- William Goldman, The Princess Bride
- Alasdair Gray, Lanark
- Robert Grudin, Book: A Novel
- Mark Haddon, The Curious Incident of the Dog in the Nighttime
- Steven Hall; The Raw Shark Texts
- Larry Heinemann, Paco's Story
- Robert A. Heinlein, The Number of the Beast; Glory Road
- Douglas Hofstadter, dialogues in Gödel, Escher, Bach
- Marek Huberath, Nest of Worlds (Gniazdo światów)
- Rhys Hughes, Nowhere Near Milk Wood; The Postmodern Mariner; The Less Lonely Planet
- B. S. Johnson, Christie Malry's Own Double-Entry
- James Joyce, Ulysses; Finnegans Wake
- Stephen King, The Dark Tower series; Misery; The Dark Half; Bag of Bones
- Michael Muhammad Knight, Osama Van Halen
- Milan Kundera, The Book of Laughter and Forgetting; The Unbearable Lightness of Being
- Stanisław Lem, A Perfect Vacuum; Imaginary Magnitude; Provocation, One Human Minute
- Doris Lessing, The Golden Notebook
- Joan Lindsay, Through Darkest Pondelayo
- Penelope Lively, Moon Tiger
- David Lodge, Therapy; Nice Work
- Ki Longfellow, Houdini Heart
- Dimitris Lyacos, With the People from the Bridge
- Steve Lyons, Doctor Who; Virgin New Adventures:Conundrum
- Barry N. Malzberg, Galaxies; Herovit's World
- Yann Martel, Life of Pi
- Ian McEwan, Atonement
- Shaun Micallef, Smithereens; Preincarnate; The President's Desk
- David Mitchell, Cloud Atlas
- Spike Milligan, Puckoon
- Walter Moers, The 13½ Lives of Captain Bluebear; Ensel und Kretel; The City of Dreaming Books
- Michael Moorcock, The Second Ether sequence (Blood, Fabulous Harbours, and The War Amongst The Angels)
- Ethan Mordden, The Buddies Cycle
- Toni Morrison, Jazz
- John Muckle, London Brakes
- Haruki Murakami, Kafka on the Shore
- Vladimir Nabokov, The Gift; Pale Fire; Look at the Harlequins!; Lolita
- Flann O'Brien, At Swim-Two-Birds
- Tim O'Brien, The Things They Carried, Going After Cacciato
- Michael Ondaatje, Running in the Family
- Juan Carlos Onetti, El Pozo
- Chuck Palahniuk, Fight Club; Diary; Haunted
- Grace Paley, A Conversation with my Father
- Kenneth Patchen, The Journal of Albion Moonlight
- Milorad Pavić's novels
- Nisio Isin, Monogatari series; Zaregoto series; Shin Honkaku Mahou Shoujo Risuka; etc.
- Arturo Pérez-Reverte, The Club Dumas
- Salvador Plascencia, The People of Paper
- Terry Pratchett, several of the Discworld; The Amazing Maurice and His Educated Rodents
- Robert Rankin's novels
- Alain Robbe-Grillet, La Jalousie; La maison de rendez-vous
- Philip Roth, Operation Shylock
- Salman Rushdie, Haroun and the Sea of Stories; Midnight's Children; Shalimar the Clown
- Douglas Rushkoff, Exit Strategy
- José Saramago, Blindness; The Cave; The Double
- Howard Schoenfeld, Built Up Logically
- Idries Shah, The Book of the Book
- Robert Sheckley, Options
- Dan Sleigh, Islands
- José Carlos Somoza, The Athenian Murders
- Gilbert Sorrentino, Mulligan Stew
- Muriel Spark, The Comforters
- Peter Straub, In the Night Room
- Jonathan Stroud, The Bartimaeus Trilogy
- José Baroja, The curious case of the shadow that died as a memory
- Janet Tashjian, The Gospel According to Larry; Vote for Larry
- J. R. R. Tolkien, "Leaf by Niggle"
- Roderick Townley, The Great Good Thing
- Miguel de Unamuno, Niebla
- Aritha Van Herk, Restlessness
- Jeff VanderMeer, City of Saints and Madmen
- Gore Vidal, Myra Breckinridge
- Kurt Vonnegut, Breakfast of Champions; Slaughterhouse-Five; Timequake
- David Foster Wallace, Brief Interviews with Hideous Men
- H. G. Wells, Tono-Bungay
- Colin Wilson, The Personality Surgeon
- Robert Anton Wilson and Robert Shea, The Illuminatus! Trilogy
- Jeanette Winterson, Sexing the Cherry The Powerbook; Gut Symmetries
- Gene Wolfe, The Fifth Head of Cerberus, "The Last Thrilling Wonder Story"
- Virginia Woolf, Orlando: A Biography
- Ronald Wright, A Scientific Romance
- Ursula K. Le Guin, Lavinia
- Sing-Shong, Omniscient Reader's Viewpoint
- Paul Ableman, ‘’The Twilight of the Vilp’’ (1969)

=== Children's books and young-adult fiction ===
- Crockett Johnson, Harold and the Purple Crayon
- John Dougherty, the Stinkbomb & Ketchup-Face series
- Michael Ende, The Neverending Story
- Cornelia Funke, Inkheart series
- Mordicai Gerstein, A Book
- Anders Jacobsson and Sören Olsson, Kobåj-Kurt (within the Bert Diaries)
- Diana Wynne Jones, Fire and Hemlock
- Arthur Ransome, Peter Duck, Missee Lee
- Lemony Snicket (Daniel Handler), A Series of Unfortunate Events (13-book series)
- Mo Willems, We Are in a Book! (Elephant and Piggie series)
- Jon Stone, The Monster at the End of This Book: Starring Lovable, Furry Old Grover
- Emily Gravett, Wolves, Little Mouse's Big Book of Fears
- Chris Wooding, Poison
- Antoine de Saint-Exupéry, The Little Prince
- Roald Dahl, The Witches

== Animated short films ==
- Chuck Jones, Duck Amuck (1953) and Rabbit Rampage (1955).
- Don Hertzfeldt, Rejected (2000) and World of Tomorrow (2015 - 2020)

== Stage plays ==
=== Pre-20th century plays ===
- Francis Beaumont, The Knight of the Burning Pestle
- Thomas Kyd, The Spanish Tragedy
- William Shakespeare, Hamlet; A Midsummer Night's Dream; Pericles, Prince of Tyre
- Manuel Tamayo y Baus, Un drama nuevo

=== Modern theater works ===
- Samuel Beckett, Waiting for Godot; Endgame
- Jackie Sibblies Drury, Fairview; We Are Proud to Present a Presentation About the Herero of Namibia, Formerly Known as Southwest Africa, From the German Sudwestafrika, Between the Years 1884–1915
- Noel Fielding and Julian Barratt, The Mighty Boosh (1998 stage show)
- Federico García Lorca, Play Without a Title / Untitled Play (1935)
- Joseph Heller, We Bombed in New Haven
- Arthur L. Kopit, End of the World with Symposium to Follow
- Ira Levin, Deathtrap
- Daniel MacIvor, Never Swim Alone and This Is a Play
- Steve Martin, Picasso at the Lapin Agile
- Luigi Pirandello, Six Characters in Search of an Author
- Tom Stoppard, Rosencrantz & Guildenstern Are Dead
- Peter Weiss, Marat/Sade (The Persecution and Assassination of Jean-Paul Marat As Performed by the Inmates of the Asylum of Charenton Under the Direction of the Marquis de Sade)
- Thornton Wilder, The Skin of Our Teeth
- Doug Wright, I Am My Own Wife

=== Musicals ===
- Passing Strange
- Pippin

== Films ==
- Keith Allen and Peter Richardson's Comic Strip film Detectives on the Edge of a Nervous Breakdown
- Woody Allen's The Purple Rose of Cairo, Deconstructing Harry and Midnight in Paris
- Robert Altman's The Player
- Troy Duffy's The Boondock Saints
- Michael Bacall and Jonah Hill's 22 Jump Street
- Steve Bendelack's The League of Gentlemen's Apocalypse
- Ingmar Bergman's Persona, The Magician, Prison, and The Passion of Anna
- Colin Trevorrow's Jurassic World
- Mel Brooks's Blazing Saddles and Spaceballs
- Dean Parisot's Galaxy Quest
- John Carpenter's In the Mouth of Madness
- Wes Craven's Scream film series and Wes Craven's New Nightmare
- Wyllis Cooper's Quiet, Please scripts
- Francis Ford Coppola's Twixt
- David Cronenberg's Videodrome, Naked Lunch, and eXistenZ
- Tom DiCillo's Living in Oblivion
- Federico Fellini's 8½
- David Fincher's Fight Club
- Marc Forster's Stranger Than Fiction
- Bob Fosse's All That Jazz
- Jason Friedberg and Aaron Seltzer's Epic Movie
- Jean-Luc Godard's Breathless, Weekend, Alphaville and King Lear
- Peter Greenaway's The Baby of Mâcon
- Kirt Gunn's Lovely by Surprise
- Michael Haneke's Funny Games
- Jim Henson's Muppets franchise (The Muppet Movie, The Great Muppet Caper, The Muppets Take Manhattan, The Muppet Christmas Carol, Muppet Treasure Island, Muppets from Space, The Muppets, and Muppets Most Wanted)
- Spike Jonze and Charlie Kaufman's Adaptation and Being John Malkovich
- Charlie Kaufman's Synecdoche, New York and Anomalisa
- Buster Keaton's Sherlock Jr.
- David Lynch's Inland Empire
- John McTiernan's Last Action Hero
- Coleman Miller's Uso Justo
- John Cameron Mitchell's Hedwig and the Angry Inch
- Mike Myers and Michael McCullers's Austin Powers
- Andrew Niccol's The Truman Show
- Tim Miller's Deadpool, David Leitch's Deadpool 2 and Shawn Levy's Deadpool & Wolverine
- Christopher Nolan's Inception
- Trey Parker's South Park: Bigger, Longer & Uncut
- Roman Polanski's What?
- Michael Powell and Emeric Pressburger's The Red Shoes
- Robert Pulcini and Shari Springer Berman's American Splendor
- Kevin Smith's Jay and Silent Bob Strike Back and Jay and Silent Bob Reboot
- Tom Tykwer's Run Lola Run
- Lana Wachowski's The Matrix Resurrections
- David Wain and Michael Showalter's They Came Together
- Shawn Wayans, Marlon Wayans, Buddy Johnson, Phil Beauman, Jason Friedberg and Aaron Seltzer's Scary Movie
- Quentin Dupieux's Rubber
- Joss Whedon and Drew Goddard's The Cabin in the Woods
- James Franco's Interior. Leather Bar.
- Michael Winterbottom's A Cock and Bull Story, a film adaptation of Laurence Sterne's Tristram Shandy
- Edgar Wright and Simon Pegg's Hot Fuzz
- Jaco Van Dormael's Mr. Nobody
- Lars von Trier's Epidemic
- Gaspar Noe's Lux Aeterna
- Saw Teong Hin's You Mean the World to Me
- Neill Blomkamp's District 9
- Sony Pictures Animation's Spider-Man: Into the Spider-Verse, Spider-Man: Across the Spider-Verse and Spider-Man: Beyond the Spider-Verse
- Ferris Bueller's Day Off
- Alejandro Jodorowsky's The Holy Mountain
- Shawn Levy's Free Guy
- Robert Rodriguez's Shorts
- Daniel Kwan and Daniel Scheinert's Everything Everywhere All At Once
- Greta Gerwig's Barbie
- Martin McDonagh's Seven Psychopaths
- Walt Disney Animation Studios's The Emperor's New Groove
- Warner Bros. Animation's The Lego Movie
- Richard Kelly's Southland Tales
- Tom Green's Freddy Got Fingered
- Ari Aster's Beau Is Afraid
- Jonas Mekas's As I Was Moving Ahead Occasionally I Saw Brief Glimpses of Beauty
- Damon Packard's Fatal Pulse
- Leos Carax's Holy Motors and Annette
- Guy Maddin's My Winnipeg and The Green Fog
- Mike Cheslik's Hundreds of Beavers
- Matt Johnson's The Dirties, Operation Avalanche, and Nirvanna the Band the Show the Movie
- Don Hertzfeldt's It's Such A Beautiful Day
- H. C. Potter's Hellzapoppin'
- Nathan Fielder's You Can See Everything

== Television shows ==
- 30 Rock
- The Amazing World of Gumball
- American Dad!
- Animaniacs
- Arrested Development
- The Basil Brush Show
- Batman: The Brave and the Bold
- The Big O
- Black Mirror
- Boston Legal
- Buffy the Vampire Slayer
- Betsy's Kindergarten Adventures
- Central Park
- Chowder
- The Cleveland Show
- Community
- Crazy Ex-Girlfriend
- Doctor Who
- Drawn Together
- Ed, Edd n Eddy
- Entourage
- The Eric Andre Show
- Family Guy
- Fleabag
- The Fresh Prince of Bel-Air
- Futurama
- Girl Meets World
- Girls5eva
- The Grim Adventures of Billy & Mandy
- High Fidelity
- Hi Hi Puffy AmiYumi
- House of Mouse
- How I Met Your Father
- How I Met Your Mother
- It's Garry Shandling's Show
- Kid Cosmic
- Lady Dynamite
- Looney Tunes
- Loki
- The Mighty Boosh
- Moonlighting
- Monty Python's Flying Circus
- The Muppet Show
- The Muppets
- Murder, She Wrote
- Ned's Declassified School Survival Guide
- Neon Genesis Evangelion
- Noel Fielding's Luxury Comedy
- On Cinema at the Cinema
- The Office (U.S.)
- OK K.O.! Let's Be Heroes
- Phineas and Ferb
- The Powerpuff Girls
- Princess Tutu
- Re:Creators
- Red Dwarf: Back to Earth
- Rick and Morty
- Robot Chicken
- Saturday Morning All Star Hits!
- Scrubs
- Sean's Show
- The Simpsons
- Smiling Friends
- South Park
- Space Ghost Coast to Coast
- SpongeBob SquarePants
- Supernatural
- Teen Titans Go!
- Teletubbies
- Ultimate Spider-Man
- Velma
- WandaVision
- Wander Over Yonder

== Comic strips, comic books, graphic novels, and manga ==
- Aka Akasaka, Kaguya-sama: Love Is War
- Berke Breathed, Bloom County, Outland and Opus
- Rich Burlew, The Order of the Stick
- John Byrne's run on The Sensational She-Hulk and Dan Slott's run on She-Hulk
- Mike Carey, The Unwritten, featuring characters coming from, and journeying into, fictional worlds
- Paul Cornell, IDW 2013 Doctor Who Special: The Girl Who Loved Doctor Who
- Jim Davis, Garfield
- Andrew Hussie, Homestuck
- Nisio Isin and Akira Akatsuki, Medaka Box
- Tatsuya Ishida, Sinfest
- Jeff Lemire and Dean Ormston, Black Hammer
- Alan Moore, Promethea, Supreme and The League of Extraordinary Gentlemen
- Alan Moore and Dave Gibbons, Watchmen
- Grant Morrison, Animal Man, Doom Patrol, Flex Mentallo, The Filth, Batman R.I.P., Final Crisis and The Invisibles
- Atsushi Ōkubo, Fire Force
- Stephan Pastis, Pearls Before Swine
- Ryukishi07, Higurashi When They Cry and Umineko When They Cry
- Claudio Sanchez, Good Apollo, I'm Burning Star IV, Vol. 1, first half of the fourth chapter of The Amory Wars presents a metafictional aspect to the story
- Dave Sim, chapters "Minds" and "Guys" from his graphic novel Cerebus
- Dan Slott, Spider-Verse
- Kristofer Straub, Checkerboard Nightmare
- Garry Trudeau, Doonesbury
- Adam Warren, Empowered
- Mason Williams, 1/0
- Sui Ishida, Tokyo Ghoul, Choujin X
- Naoki Urasawa and Takashi Nagasaki, Billy Bat

== Interactive media and video games ==
- AIHASTO, MiSide
- Ackk Studios, YIIK: A Postmodern RPG
- Against Gravity, Rec Room
- Blooming Buds Studio, Calendula
- Daniel Mullins, Pony Island, The Hex, Inscryption
- Davey Wreden, The Stanley Parable; The Beginner's Guide
- Draw Me A Pixel, There Is No Game: Wrong Dimension
- Future Cat LLC, OneShot
- Goichi Suda, Flower, Sun, and Rain; No More Heroes
- Hello Games, No Man's Sky
- Hideo Kojima, Metal Gear Solid
- Ice-Pick Lodge, Pathologic
- Ivan "Mad" Zanotti, IMSCARED
- Josh Millard, Ennuigi
- Kazutaka Kodaka, Spike Chunsoft, Danganronpa 2: Goodbye Despair, Danganronpa V3: Killing Harmony
- Keiichiro Toyama, Silent Hill
- Masato Hiruta, Shuusaku, Kisaku
- Mystman12, Baldi's Basics Classic Remastered
- NetEase Games, Marvel Rivals character Deadpool addresses the Fourth wall multiple times.
- Question, The Magic Circle
- Remedy Entertainment, Alan Wake and Alan Wake 2
- Ryukishi07, Higurashi When They Cry and Umineko When They Cry
- SCA-JI, Wonderful Everyday
- Shigesato Itoi, EarthBound; Mother 3
- Silicon Knights, Eternal Darkness
- Squanch Games, High On Life
- THQ, Saints Row: The Third, Saints Row 4
- Team Salvato, Doki Doki Literature Club!
- Toby Fox, Undertale; Deltarune
- Ubisoft Montreal, Assassin's Creed IV: Black Flag
- Vio Shimokura, YOU and ME and HER: A Love Story

== Web videos ==
- Alantutorial by Alan Resnick
- Angry Video Game Nerd and Nostalgia Critic
- Don't Hug Me I'm Scared
- Petscop
- Skies Forever Blue by Toby Fox and Itoki Hana
- The Show About the Show by Caveh Zahedi
- The Amazing Digital Circus produced by Glitch Productions and created by Gooseworx

=== Multiple authors ===
- Penny Arcade frequently features metafiction, particularly their fantasy setting Epic Legends of the Hierarchs: The Elemenstor Saga.
- The DC Comics characters Ambush Bug and The Joker are aware that they are in a comic book.
- The Marvel Comics characters She-Hulk, Howard the Duck, Deadpool, Uatu the Watcher, Purple Man, Spider-Ham, Gwenpool, and others are all aware they are in a comic book.
- The Ongoing Adventures of Rocket Llama is fiction with a metafictional history.
- Triangle and Robert is heavily metafictional.

== Artists' books ==
- Space Opera: The Artist's Book by Michael J. Weller
