= List of science fiction and fantasy detectives =

This list consists of fictional detectives from science fiction and fantasy stories.

Detective	Creator	Debut
Alex Lomax	Robert J Sawyer	Red Planet Blues (2013)
Lincoln Powell	Alfred Bester	The Demolished Man (1953)
Conrad Metcalf	Jonathan Lethem	Gun, with Occasional Music (1994)
Marid Audran	George Alec Effinger	When Gravity Fails (1986)
Elijah Baley	Isaac Asimov	The Caves of Steel (1954)
Marty Burns	Jay Russell	Celestial Dogs (1996)
Colonel Thomas Bushell	Harry Turtledove	The Two Georges (1995)
Dr. Phil D'Amato	Paul Levinson	The Silk Code (1999)
Lord Darcy	Randall Garrett	Too Many Magicians (1966)
H. Seaton Davenport	Isaac Asimov	"The Dust of Death" (1956)
October Daye	Seanan McGuire	Rosemary and Rue (2009)
Rick Deckard	Philip K. Dick	Do Androids Dream of Electric Sheep? (1968)
Hawk & Fisher	Simon Green	Hawk & Fisher (1982)
John Constantine	Alan Moore	Saga of the Swamp Thing (1985)
Harry Dresden	Jim Butcher	Storm Front (2000)
David Fisher	Harry Turtledove	The Case of the Toxic Spell Dump (1993)
Miles Flint	Kristine Kathryn Rusch	The Disappeared (2011)
Garrett P.I.	Glen Cook	Sweet Silver Blues (1987)
Dirk Gently	Douglas Adams	Dirk Gently's Holistic Detective Agency (1987)
Gil Hamilton	Larry Niven	ARM (1975)
Adam Hart	Erwin Neutzsky-Wulff	Adam Harts Opdagelser (1972)
Bernard Jaffe	David O. Russell	I Heart Huckabees (2004)
Vivian Jaffe	David O. Russell	I Heart Huckabees (2004)
Natalie Lindstrom	Stephen Woodworth	Through Violet Eyes
Donald Lydecker	James Cameron; Charles H. Eglee	Dark Angel (2000)
Kline Maxwell	S. Andrew Swann	Dragons of the Cuyahoga (1995)
Thursday Next	Jasper Fforde	The Eyre Affair (2001)
R. Daneel Olivaw	Isaac Asimov	The Caves of Steel (1954)
Nohar Rajasthan	S. Andrew Swann	Forests of the Night (1989)
Magnus Ridolph	Jack Vance	The Complete Magnus Ridolph (1985)
Sam Space	William F. Nolan	Space for Hire (1971)
Jack Spratt	Jasper Fforde	The Big Over Easy (2005)
Wendell Urth	Isaac Asimov	"The Singing Bell" (1954)
Captain Samuel Vimes	Terry Pratchett	Guards! Guards! (1989)
Dan Vogelsang	James Cameron; Charles H. Eglee	Dark Angel (2000)
Yusuke Urameshi	Yoshihiro Togashi	Yu Yu Hakusho (1991)
Raidou Kuzunoha	Atlus	Shin Megami Tensei Devil Summoner: Raidou Kuzunoha vs. the Soulless Army (2006)
Ginko	Yuki Urushibara	Mushishi (1999)
The PI With No Name	Graham Edwards	"The Wooden Baby" (April 2005 Realms of Fantasy magazine)
John Taylor	Simon R. Green	Something from the Nightside (2003)
Sir Kay	Phyllis Ann Karr	The Idylls of the Queen (1982)
Martin Hel	Robin Wood	Skorpio Magazine (1992)
Carlisle Hsing	Lawrence Watt-Evans	Nightside City (1989)
Master Li and Number Ten Ox	Barry Hughart	Bridge of Birds (1984)
Rachel Morgan	Kim Harrison	Dead Witch Walking (2004)
Takeshi Lev Kovacs	Richard K. Morgan	Altered Carbon (2002)
Liam Rhenford	Daniel Hood	Fanuilh (1994)
Tom Dreyfus	Alastair Reynolds	The Prefect (2007)
Josephus "Joe" Aloisus Miller	James S. A Corey	Leviathan Wakes (2011)
Stiles Stilinski	Jeff Davis	Teen Wolf(2011)
Christopher Lash	Lincoln Child	Death Match (2006)
Andrew Shackelford	Jim Grep	The Case of IBM 386 PC: A Detective Story for Techies (2019)
Frank Runtime	Jeremy Kubica	The CS Detective: An Algorithmic Tale of Crime, Conspiracy, and Computation (2016)
Rycroft Philostrate	René Echevarria; Travis Beacham	Carnival Row (2019)
Ray Electromatic	Adam Christopher	Brisk Money (2014)
Wisely	Ni Kuang	Diamond Flower (1963)
Hellboy	Mike Mignola	Dime Press (1993)
Miles Pennoyer	Margery Lawrence	Number Seven, Queer Street (1945)
Flaxman Low	Hesketh Hesketh-Prichard; Kate O'Brien Ryall Prichard	The Story of the Spaniards, Hammersmith (1898)
John Silence	Algernon Blackwood	John Silence, Physician Extraordinary (1908)
Skulduggery Pleasant	Derek Landy	Skulduggery Pleasant (2007)
Captain Hah Re	Peter Hogan; Steve Parkhouse	Welcome to Earth! (2012)
Doctor Occult	Jerry Siegel; Joe Shuster	New Fun (1935)
