= First Among Sequels =

2007 comic fantasy novel by Jasper Fforde

- UK First Edition cover
- Author: Jasper Fforde
- Cover artist: Mark Thomas
- Language: English
- Series: Thursday Next series
- Genre: Alternate history, Fantasy novel
- Publisher: Hodder & Stoughton (UK); Viking Press (US)
- Publication date: 2007
- Publication place: United Kingdom
- Media type: Print (Hardcover)
- Pages: 416 (Hardcover)
- ISBN: 978-0-340-83575-3
- OCLC: 85828957
- Preceded by: Something Rotten
- Followed by: One of our Thursdays is Missing

First Among Sequels is an alternate history, comic fantasy novel by the British author Jasper Fforde. It is the fifth Thursday Next novel, first published on 5 July 2007 in the United Kingdom, and on 24 July 2007 in the United States. The novel follows the continuing adventures of Thursday Next in her fictional version of Swindon and in the BookWorld, and is the first of a new four-part Nextian series.

The title was originally announced, at the end of Fforde's novel The Fourth Bear, as The War of the Words.

== Plot introduction ==
In order to save the future, undercover SpecOps investigator Thursday Next attempts to convince her son Friday to join the ChronoGuard. To complicate matters, she'll have to deal with renegade apprentices, ruthless corporations, and a sting operation from the Cheese Enforcement Agency.

=== Explanation of the novel's title ===
The title First Among Sequels was met with stiff resistance from Fforde's publishers because it had 'sequel' in the title, and it was felt that telegraphing the 'sequelness' of the book might be a bad move. It was decided, however, to capitalise on the fact that this was a series - a sort of 'Have you discovered Thursday Next yet?' approach to marketing.

First Among Sequels is the first part of a new four-part Thursday Next series, which is continued with One of our Thursdays is Missing, The Woman Who Died a Lot and concluded in Dark Reading Matter.

The title is a parody of First Among Equals, which is the title of a best-selling Jeffrey Archer novel, but also comes from the English translation of the Latin phrase primus inter pares. It is traditionally used to describe the position of the British Prime Minister, since in the British Constitution the position of prime minister has no official existence, and the office holder is simply the 'most powerful' of the Queen's advisors in Cabinet.

== Characters ==
- Thursday Next – the main protagonist. Formerly a member of SpecOps department 27, the Literary Detectives;
- Thursday1-4 – a fictional incarnation of Thursday, encountered in the BookWorld. The first four of Thursday's adventures (Note: The Eyre Affair, Lost in a Good Book, The Well of Lost Plots and Something Rotten.) have been published in the parallel universe of the Thursday Next series; however, these publications bear little resemblance to the facts of those adventures, and Thursday herself is portrayed as "mostly action, and very little thought". Thursday1-4 is the BookWorld character of this Thursday. Despite the novels being set between 1985 and 1988, Thursday1-4 looks exactly the same as the real Thursday;
- Thursday5 – another BookWorld incarnation of Thursday. 'Real' Thursday, having endured the aggression of the first four books, had insisted that the next book, The Great Samuel Pepys Fiasco (Note: This is not a part of the 'real world' Thursday Next series of novels.) reflected her more compassionate nature. Unfortunately, the result was Thursday5, a nice, but dopey, insufferable drip. The Great Samuel Pepys Fiasco was remaindered within six months of publication, while the Thursday1–4 novels continued to sell well. She has been allocated to Thursday as a Jurisfiction cadet for training. As with Thursday1-4, Thursday5 looks exactly the same as the real Thursday, despite her novel being set 6 years earlier;
- Landen Parke-Laine – Thursday's husband;
- Friday Next – the eldest child of Thursday and Landen, and the only boy. Apparently a "tedious teenage cliché: grunting, sighing at any request, and staying in bed until past midday";
- Tuesday Next – the daughter of Thursday and Landen. A mathematical genius, who solved Fermat's Last Theorem at the age of 9;
- Jenny Next – Thursday's elusive youngest daughter, the only one of her children not named after a day of the week in the hope that "one of us should have a semblance of normality". Jenny Next was never actually born but placed in the mind of Thursday Next by Aornis Hades which is why Jenny never makes an appearance in "First Among Sequels".
- Spike Stoker – ex SpecOps department 17 agent;
- Commander Trafford Bradshaw – The Jurisfiction Bellman, the first to hold the post twice;
- Bowden Cable – Thursday's former SpecOps-27 partner, and now manager of Acme Carpets.

== Major themes ==
As with the other Thursday Next novels, time travel forms a central part of the plot for First Among Sequels. Fforde has, however, stated that:

"I was getting slightly browned off with the whole time travel idea, and like you do with less popular characters, I wanted to kill it off." – Jasper Fforde.

It emerges that SO-12, the ChronoGuard have been travelling through time, even though time travel hasn't yet been invented, on the basis that it will be at some time. One of the main plot lines in this novel follows Thursday's and Friday's attempts to ensure that invention never happens, thereby avoiding the end of the world.

The other major theme of this novel is the translation of reality television to the literary world. With book readership numbers dropping drastically, the governing body of the BookWorld comes up with the idea of setting a novel's central characters a series of tasks, and allowing readers to choose how the novel should proceed, vote out unpopular characters and decide which plot lines should be followed. This idea is first attempted on Jane Austen's novel Pride and Prejudice. Fforde, not a fan of reality TV, uses the popularity of such shows, shorter attention spans, and falling levels of reading to illustrate the "diminishing Now" of instant gratification:

"The Now is a bit short at present, and I think it needs lengthened - read books, plan ahead, and watch less junk TV." – Jasper Fforde.

== Literary significance and reception ==
Upon release, First Among Sequels reached number 45 in the Amazon sales ranking in the UK, while on the US site it reached number 105. The novel entered USA Today's best seller list on 2 August 2007, at number 60 and at number 10 in the New York Times Best Seller list.

Reviews of the novel have been complimentary, although it has been noted that it is best to read the series in order to avoid confusion. As with other Thursday Next books, the novel is peppered with literary references to 'classic' (and not so classic) novels, which may put readers off. Fforde himself was initially concerned about this, but "now I don’t worry so much. I don’t use really obscure characters. They’re ones people have heard of even if they haven’t read the book." – Jasper Fforde.

=== Reviews ===
"Grab a cup of tea, some chocolate biscuits, and settle down in a very comfortable chair for a long, funny, and quite witty read." – Greenman Review.

== Publication history ==

- 2007, UK, Hodder & Stoughton, ISBN 978-0-340-83575-3, publication date 5 July 2007, Hardback;
- 2007, USA, Viking Adult, ISBN 978-0-670-03871-8, publication date 24 July 2007, Hardback (cover art to the right);
- 2007, USA, Recorded Books, ISBN 978-1-4281-5664-7, publication date July 2007, audiobook, narrated by Emily Gray;

Additionally, the UK version of the audiobook was released on 8 October 2007 by Hodder & Stoughton, ISBN 978-1-84456-144-5.

== The Jasper Fforde ARG ==
An alternate-reality game was commissioned from Coney by UK publishers Hodder & Stoughton to promote the launch of First Among Sequels in the UK. The campaign won a Book Industry 'Nibby'.

== Errata ==
The entire first print run of the UK Hodder edition of First Among Sequels is missing the footnoterphone lines of dialogue. These should appear at the bottom of pages 194, 195, 332, 333, 339, 392 and 393. Since the books are already in the shops and thus too late for error slips, the missing text can be found on the Jasper Fforde website in the 'Book Upgrades' section. The website also explains that the publisher, Hodder General, "will provide a corrected paperback edition free of charge to anyone sending the title page and a return address."
