= Early riser =

Early riser may refer to:

- Waking up early
- Early Riser, the debut studio album by Taylor McFerrin
- "early RISER", a track from the album Fakevox by Japanese electronic music band Plus-Tech Squeeze Box
- Early Riser (2018), novel by Jasper Fforde
