= The Last Dragonslayer =

2010 fantasy novel by Jasper Fforde

- First edition
- Author: Jasper Fforde
- Language: English
- Series: The Chronicles of Kazam
- Genre: Fantasy
- Publisher: Hodder & Stoughton
- Publication date: 4 Nov 2010 (Hardback)
- Publication place: UK
- Media type: Print Hardback
- Pages: 280 pp
- ISBN: 978-1-4447-0717-5
- Followed by: The Song of the Quarkbeast

The Last Dragonslayer is a young adult fantasy novel by Jasper Fforde. It is set in an alternative world in which magic is real, but has become weakened and is also being replaced by modern technology. The setting is almost like modern Britain, except that it is split into a number of small counties.

== Plot ==
Jennifer Strange is almost 16. A Foundling, or orphan, she is two years away from completing her indentured servitude to the currently missing Mr. Zambini, who runs one of the last magic employment houses. Jennifer is in charge of managing all the wizards under her care and providing them with work, as well as filling out all the governmental forms required for jobs that are associated with performing magic in the current era. She soon meets Tiger Prawns, a new foundling, who will work under her for the next two years while she teaches him how to do her job, as she will be free to leave when she turns 18. She is soon pulled away by one of the wizards who is a pre-cog with glimpses of a version of the future. He says that the last dragon will die soon.

Jennifer calls up another pre-cog and he tells her it will happen on Sunday at noon. The wizards of Zambini Towers begin noting that their powers seem stronger than before, and magic appears to be building instead of slowly depleting like it has for the past four hundred years. Jennifer learns about the Dragonpact, which was made to protect both people and dragons, and provides each dragon with a dragonland that is protected by a magical shield that will vaporise any who try to cross it. She seeks out the current Dragonslayer and he tells her that he has been waiting for her. Jennifer Strange is the last Dragonslayer as outlined in the Dragonslayer sword that was created with the Dragonpact. She gets a crash course in dragon slaying, takes the oath and immediately becomes the new Dragonslayer when her predecessor suddenly crumbles to dust as his true age finally catches up with him.

Jennifer goes through a time of political manipulation by King Snodd IV, who uses all of his resources to try and replace her, sway her decisions, or corrupt her. She uses quick wit and her loyal Quarkbeast, a terrifying mix of a blender and maybe a terrier, as well as some unlikely assistants, to evade this. Jennifer is reluctant to kill the dragon unless he violates the Dragonpact. She goes and speaks with him twice before the prophesied day and he, like any dragon would, gives her vague answers.

During this time, Jennifer has an apprentice, Gordon. He regulates the press, makes breakfast, and sometimes drives the Slayermobile. However, when the time comes for Jennifer to kill the dragon, she discovers his betrayal and his allegiance to a large corporation. His greed and that of all the millions of people waiting outside the dragonland in the hopes of securing a piece of land for themselves when the magic shield dies with the dragon enrages Jennifer. The Quarkbeast sacrifices himself for Jennifer, and she uses her quick thinking to enact revenge on Gordon. Eventually, she does slay the dragon, and is filled with such white-hot fury that she lets out a scream so loud and so powerful it unleashes what the wizards speculated was building: Big Magic.

With this, two dragons emerge from where one once stood, and new magic surges. Jennifer learns the nefarious truth about the Dragonpact and how it was not an equal protection, but the early dragons found a way to fix it in the present day. Jennifer serves a brief stint in prison but returns to Zambini Towers to continue her role as acting manager, as well as Last Dragonslayer.

== Context ==
The style is similar to his Thursday Next and Nursery Crimes series, but the assumptions and world-rules are very different. Unlike other Jasper Fforde novels, there are no obvious references to specific works of fiction, even though many standard elements of fantasy are used for comic effect.

The Last Dragonslayer is the first in a four-part series, followed by The Song of the Quarkbeast (published in 2011), The Eye of Zoltar (published in 2013), and finally The Great Troll War (published in 2021).

== Adaptation ==
The novel was adapted into a TV movie by Blueprint Pictures and Motion Content Group, and broadcast on Sky One on Christmas Day, 2016. It starred Ellise Chappell as Jennifer, Andrew Buchan as Zambini and Richard E. Grant as the voice of the dragon.
