= Grudin =

Grudin is a surname, and may refer to:

- Jonathan Grudin, a Principal Researcher at Microsoft Research in human-computer interaction.
- Robert Grudin, an American writer and philosopher.
