= Lincoln green =

Green colour of dyed woollen cloth formerly originating in Lincoln, England

Lincoln Green

Color coordinates
- Hex triplet: #195905
- sRGB^{B} (r, g, b): (25, 89, 5)
- HSV (h, s, v): (106°, 94%, 35%)
- CIELCh_{uv} (L, C, h): (33, 47, 125°)
- Source: ColorHexa
- B: Normalized to [0–255] (byte)

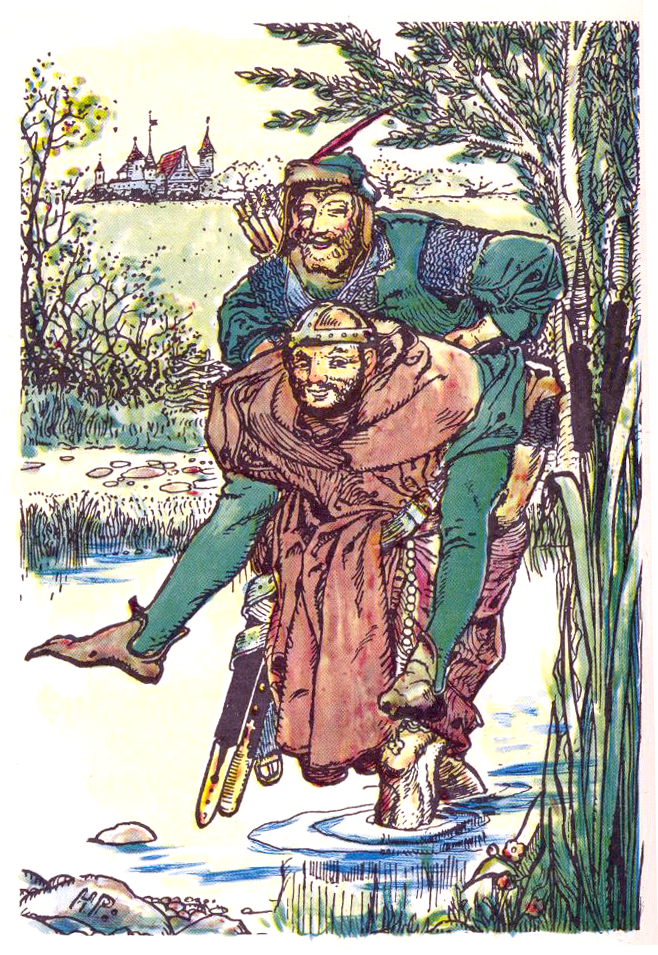
Frontispiece of Howard Pyle's 1883 The Merry Adventures of Robin Hood shows Robin being carried by Friar Tuck. Robin wears a tunic and leggings approximating a Lincoln green shade

Lincoln green is the colour of dyed woollen cloth formerly originating in Lincoln, England, a major cloth town during the high Middle Ages. The dyers of Lincoln, known for colouring wool with woad to give it a strong blue shade, created the eponymous Lincoln green by overdyeing this blue wool with yellow weld or dyers' broom. Other colours like "Coventry blue" and "Kendal green" were linked to the dyers of different English towns.

Lincoln green is often associated with Robin Hood and his Merry Men in Sherwood Forest, Nottinghamshire.

== History ==
The first recorded use of Lincoln green as a colour name in English was in 1510. By the late sixteenth century, Lincoln green was a thing of the past. Michael Drayton provided a sidenote in his Poly-Olbion (published 1612): "Lincoln anciently dyed the best green in England." Cloth of Lincoln green was more pleasing than undyed shepherd's gray cloth: "When they were clothed in Lyncolne grene they kest away their gray", according to A Lytell Geste of Robyn Hode, ca. 1510, and Lincoln green betokened an old-fashioned forester even in the fancy dress of Edmund Spenser's The Faery Queene:

All in a woodmans iacket he was clad
Of Lincolne greene, belayd with siluer lace;

— Spenser: Faerie Queene 6.2.5, lines 6-7

Robin Hood's Garland, the popular ballad printed in eighteenth-century compilations, offers an unexpected picture of Robin as he presented himself at court:

He cloathed his men in Lincoln green,
And himself in scarlet red.

The distinction was in the cost of scarlet, which was dyed with kermes, derived from the Kermes vermilio insect native to the Mediterranean. Lincoln scarlet, from its imported dyestuff, was more expensive than Lincoln green.

In 1198 the Sheriff of Lincoln bought ninety ells (about 112 yards) of scarlet cloth for £30 (6s 8d per ell); although the cloth was a finely finished fabric, its high price was almost certainly due mainly to the extremely costly dye-stuff, greyne (graine) from Kermes or scarlet grain. In 1182 the Sheriff of Lincoln bought Scarlet at 6s 8d/ell, Green and Blanchet both at 3s/ell and Gray at approximately 1s 8d/ell. By 1216 three guilds controlling the cloth trade were established in Lincoln, the Weavers', Dyers', and Fullers' guilds.

== Modern survivals ==
"Lincoln green" was revived in the years prior to the First World War, when it was adopted as the colour of the full-dress uniform of the Lincolnshire Yeomanry. This military version took the form of a distinctively light shade, which contrasted sharply with the sombre rifle green widely worn by other regiments of the British Army. Lincoln green was also worn as the facing colour on the scarlet tunics of the Sherwood Foresters Regiment from 1913.

The Olympic gold-medalist ice dancers Jayne Torvill and Christopher Dean, who both originate from Nottinghamshire in the East Midlands, wore Lincoln green during their free dance at the 1980 Winter Olympics in Lake Placid.

== In culture ==
In 'The Friar's Tale', part of The Canterbury Tales, Geoffrey Chaucer has the Corrupt Summoner meet a devil disguised as a Yeoman dressed in Lincoln green.

Sir Walter Scott in his 1820 novel Ivanhoe mentioned Lincoln green three times: in Chapter 7 ("One of these, a stout well-set yeoman, arrayed in Lincoln green, having twelve arrows stuck in his belt...."), Chapter 15 ("...[I]f thou losest [the prize] thou shalt be stript of thy Lincoln green...."), and Chapter 23 (...[O]ne hundred yards of Lincoln green to make doublets to thy men....").

Charles Dickens, in his 1838 novel Nicholas Nickleby, mentions Lincoln green in Chapter Six's tale within a tale concerning the Baron of Grogzwig: "Well, but the Baron Von Koeldwethout of Grogzwig! He was a fine swarthy fellow, with dark hair and large moustachios, who rode a-hunting in clothes of Lincoln green, with russet boots on his feet, and a bugle slung over his shoulder like the guard of a long stage. When he blew this bugle, four-and-twenty other gentlemen of inferior rank, in Lincoln green a little coarser, and russet boots with a little thicker soles, turned out directly: and away galloped the whole train, with spears in their hands like lacquered area railings, to hunt down the boars, or perhaps encounter a bear: in which latter case the baron killed him first, and greased his whiskers with him afterwards."

William Makepeace Thackeray in his 1848 novel Vanity Fair mentioned Lincoln green in Chapter III: "What causes them to labour at piano-forte sonatas, and to learn four songs from a fashionable master at a guinea a lesson, and to play the harp if they have handsome arms and neat elbows, and to wear Lincoln Green toxopholite hats and feathers, but that they may bring down some "desirable" young man with those killing bows and arrows of theirs?"

The colour appears used in the dystopian novel Shades of Grey 1: The Road to High Saffron by Jasper Fforde, in which shades of green—and Lincoln green in particular—have narcotic effects.

In Chapter One of the 1938 novel The Fashion in Shrouds by Margery Allingham, in setting the scene for the “Whodunnit”, the fortunes of a fashion house are revived “from the day that the Valentine cape in Lincoln-green face-cloth flickered across the salon and won the hearts of twenty-five professional buyers and subsequently five hundred private purchasers…”.

In Stephen Wheeler's 2020 historical mystery novel Knight's Honour, set during the civil war and Battle of Lincoln in 1217, the protagonist Brother Walter explains the production of Lincoln green: "The colour is a mixture of two dyes - blue woad and yellow weld." He further states that Lincoln's dyers originally used weld alone, which he connects with the nickname "yellowbellies".

== See also ==
- Lists of colours
