= Stephen Woodworth =

Stephen Woodworth may refer to

- Stephen Woodworth (author), American author
- Stephen Woodworth (politician), Canadian politician

== See also ==
- Steven E. Woodworth (born 1961), American historian
