= Something Rotten (Fforde novel) =

2004 comic fantasy novel by Jasper Fforde

- Author: Jasper Fforde
- Language: English
- Series: Thursday Next
- Genre: Alternate history, Fantasy novel
- Publisher: Viking Adult
- Publication date: 5 August 2004
- Publication place: United Kingdom
- Media type: Print (hardback & paperback)
- Pages: 320
- ISBN: 0-670-03359-6
- OCLC: 55019141
- Dewey Decimal: 823/.914 22
- LC Class: PR6106.F67 T484 2004
- Preceded by: The Well of Lost Plots
- Followed by: First Among Sequels

Something Rotten is the fourth book in the Thursday Next series by Jasper Fforde. It continues the story some two years after the point where The Well of Lost Plots leaves off.

The novel was a finalist for the 2005 Dilys Award.

== Background ==
The book sees Thursday return from the world of fiction to the alternative Swindon that Fforde introduced in The Eyre Affair; she is accompanied by Hamlet, Prince of Denmark, whose excursion from the world of fiction with Thursday forms the main sub-plot.

The title is taken from Hamlet I.iv: "Something is rotten in the State of Denmark".

== Plot summary ==
The story opens with Thursday still in the world of fiction in her job as the Bellman, head of the literary police force Jurisfiction. She is still hunting the Minotaur that escaped in the last book; she is tiring of fiction, however, and longs to return to her own world and get back her husband Landen, who was removed from time by the evil Goliath Corporation in 1947. Despite Landen's non-existence, Thursday still has her son (Friday Next) who is now two years old.

Thursday and Friday return to her mother (Wednesday) in Swindon, with Hamlet who is accompanying them on an excursion to the "Outland" to find out what people in the real world think of him. Her mother, whose main functions appear to be to make tea and to provide Battenberg cake, has some curious house guests: Emma Hamilton, Otto von Bismarck, and a family of dodos. Both humans are apparently staying for a rest, while Thursday's father (who has now been re-admitted to the time-travelling ChronoGuard) sorts out various parts of history for them.

Despite her earlier transgressions that caused her to flee to the Bookworld in the first place, Thursday gets her job back at SpecOps-27 as a Literary Detective and catches up with her old colleagues. She learns that in her absence, Yorrick Kaine has joined forces with Goliath Corporation and plans to oust the ageing English President George Formby. As Prime Minister, Kaine wields some mysterious persuasive influence over Parliament and the people, and has used it to pass some bizarre laws and to stir up hatred of Denmark. Yorrick has also taken out a hit on her: he has hired an assassin known as "The Windowmaker", who is actually Cindy Stoker, the wife of Thursday's longtime friend, Spike.

Thursday's father warns her that Kaine's ambitions may cause nuclear armageddon and that it is up to her to stop him. On top of this, she is visited by tearful agents from the Bookworld (Mrs. Tiggy-Winkle and Emperor Zhark) who tell her that all sorts of things are going wrong without her leadership; for starters, without its titular character, the play Hamlet has merged with The Merry Wives of Windsor to create a new play called "The Merry Wives of Elsinore", which is not nearly as good as either original play (in the words of Emperor Zhark, "it takes a long time to get funny, and, when it finally does, everyone dies"). Meanwhile, her most pressing problem is finding reliable childcare for Friday.

Goliath Corporation have decided to become the new world religion to avoid a prophecy (the prophecy states that the Goliath Corporation will fall; Goliath believes that converting itself into a religion will exempt it from destruction, as the prophecy specifies a business). Thursday meets the CEO—at their headquarters in the Isle of Man—and gets a promise that they will un-eradicate Landen in exchange for her forgiveness. Thursday feels duped when she finds that, through some form of mind control, she has formally forgiven them, even though there is no sign of her husband. Then suddenly he is back, but takes a while to stabilise. Thursday must wait patiently for his un-eradication to "stick". In the meantime, she embarks on several seemingly impossible tasks, which include smuggling ten truckloads of banned Danish literature into Wales, tracking down an illegal clone of William Shakespeare, and teaching Friday to speak properly.

On top of all of this, Thursday still has to help the Swindon Mallets win the 1988 Croquet Superhoop final to thwart Kaine and Goliath and avoid the impending end of the world (as foretold by the aforementioned prophecy).

She succeeds but not without a near-death experience and a visit to the gateway to the Underworld (which turns out to be a planned-but-never-built service station on the M4 motorway). The final chapters contain some curious time paradoxes in which Thursday finds that she has met herself at several other stages in her own lifespan, including one character which had seemed to be an independent character.

== Reception ==
Booklist's Keir Graff wrote, "Fforde's inventiveness is seemingly inexhaustible", noting that "in addition to real- and book-world metaphysics, he delves into time-travel conundrums, lacing it all together with goofy, self-referential prose and a breakneck plot. The silliness that makes the literary in-jokes funny works less well when Fforde tries skewering multinational corporations, but that's a quibble".

Publishers Weekly called the whole series as "zany" and "hypercreative" and Something Rotten "more than a little wacky". They noted, "The novel is packed with screwball details as characters get 'written' in and out of the story, hybridized creatures stalk malls and Shakespeare clones start popping up everywhere." They also highlighted the "humorous illustrations and curious footnotes sprinkled throughout".
