= The Constant Rabbit =

2020 novel by Jasper Fforde

- First edition
- Author: Jasper Fforde
- Genre: science fantasy
- Published: 2020
- Publisher: Hodder & Stoughton

The Constant Rabbit is a 2020 science fantasy allegorical novel by Jasper Fforde. It was published by Hodder & Stoughton.

== Synopsis ==
In 1965, an "Anthropomorphising Event" transformed 18 ordinary rabbits into 18 intelligent, talking, human-sized rabbits. By 2020, there are over a million of them in Britain, and the United Kingdom Anti-Rabbit Party has taken power. Peter Knox is a small-town "rabbit spotter" whose life is changed when a family of rabbits — one of whom, Constance, was his friend in university — moves in next door.

== Reception ==
The Guardian noted Fforde's "trademark bizarre whimsy", and described the novel as "a crazed cross between Watership Down and Nineteen Eighty-Four".

Kirkus Reviews considered the novel to be "wonderfully absurd" and "astonishingly well-crafted", lauding Fforde's use of a narrator who "thinks himself a well-meaning cog in a regrettably evil machine". Starburst similarly approved of Peter as a "likeable but spineless hero", and called his friendship with Constance "a satisfying exploration of the importance of doing what you can", praising the novel's "wit, wisdom, and filmic physicality", but acknowledging that "the initial concept's introduction may be a little heavy-handed".
