= Book: A Novel =

Book by Robert Grudin

- First edition
- Author: Robert Grudin
- Language: English
- Genre: Metafiction
- Publisher: Random House
- Publication date: 1992
- Publication place: United States
- Media type: Print Hardcover and paperback
- Pages: 251pp
- ISBN: 0-14-023113-7

Book: A Novel (1992) is a metafictional novel by Robert Grudin, published in 1992. The novel was shortlisted for the Pulitzer Prize in Literature.

== Plot ==
The story follows English professor Adam Snell as he realizes that someone is trying to kill both him and his book, Sovrana Sostrata, a book about truth. As a metafiction work the novel parodies literary forms—each chapter is told in a different style ranging from traditional linear drama, to newspaper reports, to a playwright's script, to a carefully annotated scholarly work from the 19th century—to the point where the novel's footnotes come alive and literally try to take over the narrative.

== Summary ==
J. Thoreau Marshall, the acting president of the University of Washagon (a portmanteau of Washington and Oregon), receives word that a teacher named Adam Snell has gone missing. Glanda Gazza, the head of the English department, sends fellow teacher Harold Emmons to investigate. Emmons searches Snell's office and finds that copies of Sovrana Sostrata, Snell's novel, have vanished, and that someone attempted to erase files from Snell's computer. Sovrana Sostrata, a novel Snell wrote in which the eponymous heroine asserts her independence and lays bare her sexuality, was a commercial failure and caused controversy among the staff at the university. The teachers bicker over Snell and his book's merits at a post-tenure review for him, as the search for the missing man continues. The novel states that a professor of literary theory named Frank Underwood has attacked Snell, though no other character knows this. Emmons and Lieutenant Pierce find Snell, gravely injured but alive, in a field of overgrown vegetation on the university campus. Meanwhile, a publisher named Harper Nathan discovers an old copy of Sovrana Sostrata at an inn and vows to republish it.

Frank Underwood, who developed an inferiority complex early in life due to his overachieving brother Gerald, grew to hate Snell because of Snell's old-fashioned values and general enjoyment of life, and so Underwood decided to destroy every copy of Sovrana Sostrata, raiding Snell's office and inadvertently attacking Snell in the process. Snell recuperates in the hospital, unable to remember who attacked him. Harper Nathan contacts Snell, as Snell works with Emmons and Pierce to theorize who the "libricide" is, the person who has been destroying Snell's book.

Underwood sets out with a gun to finish the job of killing Snell, just as Snell begins to suspect him. Harper comes to visit Snell, and the two of them stake out Underwood's house only to be attacked by Underwood. Snell and Harper escape, and later fall in love. The police set out to arrest Underwood, who flees to Hoboken. Sovrana Sostrata becomes a literary sensation, and Underwood dies in a failed attempt to blow up several crates of copies of the book in a warehouse in New York City. Snell is working on a second book, On Wonderment.

A postscript by Adam Snell states that Robert Grudin himself vanished after writing this book. A second postscript, apparently written by Sovrana herself, reaches out to Snell and tries to convince him that she is the only woman in his life.

== Themes ==
The novel explores the power struggles that exist with academia and the lack of administration support for creativity within universities. They are similar to other works by Robert Grudin because they also place emphasis on liberty, determinism, and other political philosophies.

== Reception ==
Jeff Simon of The Buffalo News called it "a riotous and even riveting yarn about a pack of weaselly academic deconstructionists", and insisted that its "satire is never so broad that it misses its aim". J.C. Martin of the Arizona Daily Star noted that Book "takes aim at targets viewed by many of us as fairly special. They include: literary theory and deconstructionism, overbearing professors both male and female, academic power players, academic pretensions ... Grudin fires a few salvos at the publishing business, too." D.T. MAX of the Tampa Bay Times called it "a clever, malicious thriller", an "alternately dazzling and goofy satire", and a book of "comically verbal contortions". George Myers Jr. compared it to Edward Allen's novel Mustang Sally, calling it "another of those in-joke English Department novels that burlesques bookishness while thumbing the nose at ProfWorld".

Michael Upchurch of The Seattle Times wrote that Grudin himself called it "a novel about the consequences of a creative act". Upchurch saw the novel as "autobiographical in theme", based on "the reaction Grudin got whenever he presented his colleagues and supervisors with an unconventional publication". Ultimately, Upchurch praised the book as "eloquent on the mysterious contract between creator and creation, and persuasive in cautioning against works of art being picked apart too cavalierly", and he predicted that Book might convince some English professors "to reinstate a back-to-basics core curriculum".

Bob Trimble of The Dallas Morning News conceded that "the book is really about making fun of academic politics and parodying a number of literary styles. The book's fun, but it's one college English professors may enjoy more than the average Joe." Geoff Seamans of The Roanoke Times observed that "Unlike his professorial colleagues, [Snell] has published a real book, a work of the imagination. But that counts against rather than for him, and he has failed to publish the obscure, jargon-laden papers that would place him in a school of literary theory and thus win him more departmental allies." Shawn Gillick of the Waterloo Region Record wrote that "Grudin has captured the tone of this academic theatre of the absurd very well", though he called the novel "a disjointed mishmash of styles".

== See also ==
- List of metafictional works
