= Shades of Grey =

2009 novel by Jasper Fforde

Shades of Grey 1: The Road to High Saffron
- Shades of Grey
- Author: Jasper Fforde
- Cover artist: Steven Wilson
- Country: United Kingdom
- Language: English
- Genre: fantasy, science fiction
- Publisher: Viking Adult (US); Hodder & Stoughton (UK)
- Published: December 2009
- Media type: Print (hardcover)
- Followed by: Red Side Story

Shades of Grey: The Road to High Saffron (2012, simply titled Shades of Grey originally) is a dystopian novel, the first in the Shades of Grey series by novelist Jasper Fforde. The story takes place in Chromatacia, an alternative version of the United Kingdom wherein social class is determined by one's ability to perceive colour.

== Plot ==
=== Setting ===
Chromatacia is a future dystopian society that exists at least five hundred years (although possibly more) after the collapse of our own society, identified as 'the Previous'. All life is governed by the laws set by Our Munsell, the supposed and revered founder of Chromatacia. The rules range from sensible, such as outlawing murder, to bizarre, such as outlawing the number 73 or the manufacture of spoons (though old spoons are often kept as personal heirlooms). In addition, Munsell's laws significantly restrict the use of technology (not only is there no technological progress, but even the existing technology is periodically outlawed in society-wide "Leapbacks.") Likewise, literature is all but extinct, to the point that, in libraries, librarians outnumber books.

The society is deeply collectivist and values conformity above all. Its official currency is "merits", which could be earned, say, by snitching on other individuals or by working overtime (working normal hours is one's duty and therefore unpaid), or lost as penalty for socially unacceptable behavior (such as uttering falsehoods in public). An individual whose merit balance goes too far below zero is sent for reeducation or "Reboot" (the nature of this reboot is not explained until late in the book.)

The social hierarchy of Chromatacia is defined by the ability to see colour, which is limited in most people to varying degrees of one hue, or at most two. Each individual is administered a vision test when they turn 20 years old, and the results of this test determine their social status, their allowable career paths, and even the set of permissible marriage partners. 'Greys', who score below 10% on all colours, form the 'working class' - they perform all the menial duties and engage in unpaid physical labor. The rest become 'white-collar' workers. These form a complex multi-dimensional hierarchy (e.g. 'Blues' and 'Purples' outrank 'Reds', but scoring over 50% on any color identifies one as "Chromogentsia", and scoring over 70% on Red makes one city administration material.) Color vision is largely heritable, but even Greys often have colour-sensitive children and vice versa, resulting in continuous class mixing.

The perception of colour also affects their health and wellness: certain colours have medical effects on people. Doctors in this world are called "swatchmen", since they effect cures by showing swatches of colour to their patients. Shades of green, especially Lincoln green, act as a narcotic, and are often abused as recreational drugs.

Surnames and names of towns are usually derived from various shades of colour, such as jade, carmine and saffron. The colour values as described in the book supposedly come from the Munsell color system as described by Albert Henry Munsell, but are derived from the HSV color space. The "Ishihara", a test used to determine one's colour vision, is a reference to Shinobu Ishihara, the real-world inventor of a colour perception test.

Far from being our familiar United Kingdom, the world of Chromatacia is home to carnivorous trees, giant man-eating swans, and numerous other hazards, including the "Riffraff" - wild, genetically unmodified humans.

Details reveal that East Carmine is located in Wales (the A470 road is mentioned), and the description of the town close to the lower of a series of five dams suggests it is Rhayader, at the foot of the Elan Valley. Nearby Rusty Hill was once Builth Wells. The town of Vermillion used to be Hereford. The town of High Saffron is on the coast beyond the dams, which suggests Aberystwyth.

=== Plot summary ===
Protagonist Eddie Russett, a 20-year-old 'Red', travels to the outer-fringe town of East Carmine with his father, a swatchman, on what he assumes to be a temporary posting. There he meets Jane, a Grey with an upturned nose and a fierce temper, who often causes personal injury to whomever she meets.

In the course of the story, Eddie discovers that his odds of ever returning to his hometown are somewhat lower than he originally expected; that several prominent local officials want either to murder him or to marry him to their daughters; and, eventually, that much of what the government has told the public is not true.

=== Characters ===
- Eddie Russett: Protagonist, a Red with good perception. He has unquestioningly toed the line for twenty years but learning the truth behind the Collective disrupts his life.
- Jane G23: A rather violent and short-tempered Grey who has some rare abilities.
- Violet deMauve: A spoilt brat on the Blue side of Purple (her mother was Navy) who always gets her way and is determined to marry Eddie to bring her family line back to full Purple.
- Tommo Cinnabar: A Red with a huge array of scams, deals and negotiations going on. He would sell his own grandmother if the price was right, and did on one occasion.
- Dorian: A Grey, the editor of the local newspaper and a very talented photographer. Wishes to elope with Imogen.
- Courtland Gamboge: The Yellow Deputy Prefect who abuses his power and is interested only in making himself look good. He and Eddie do not see eye to eye on anything.
- Sally Gamboge: East Carmine's Yellow Prefect, a nasty piece of work who looks out for her own family.
- Holden Russett: A Red, Eddie's father and the village Swatchman.
- Travis Canary: A fallen Yellow who is escaping from Reboot. He runs out of the village into the night one evening.
- Bunty McMustard: An officious Yellow.
- Imogen Fandango: A low-level Purple who is in love with Dorian. They want to elope.
- Carlos Fandango: The lowest-level Purple in East Carmine, and the Janitor, responsible for maintaining the two cars and the street lights.
- Lucy Ochre: A young Red girl with an obsession with hidden harmonies in the Earth.
- George deMauve: Purple Prefect, and Head Prefect of East Carmine. He is interested only in getting his daughter married to a strong Red and the family getting back up to hue.
- Mr Turquoise: East Carmine's Blue Prefect
- Mr Yewberry: East Carmine's Red Prefect
- Constance Oxblood: Eddie's planned fiancee (their relationship was arranged by their parents and it lacks any romantic elements whatever.) She is a wealthy Red and has to choose between marrying Eddie or Roger Maroon.
- Mrs Lapis-Lazuli: A Blue ninth-generation librarian in East Carmine
- Matthew Gloss: An employee from National Colour who is in East Carmine to conduct the Ishihara tests and supposedly fix a leaking magenta pipe. It is implied that he is a Red. He encourages Eddie to join National Colour, but appears to have a darker side.
- Velma Ochre: A slightly eccentric Red who wishes to marry Holden Russett.
- Bertie Magenta: A posh Purple from Jade-under-Lime, on whom Eddie plays a prank that results in him getting sent to East Carmine.
- Zane: A grey who disguised as a purple in Vermillion.

== Inspiration ==
The beginning of the book contains a quote from philosopher Alfred North Whitehead on the subject of colour:

There is no light or colour as a fact in external nature. There is merely motion of material. ... When the light enters your eyes and falls on the retina, there is motion of material. Then your nerves are affected and your brain is affected, and again this is merely motion of material. ... The mind, in apprehending, experiences sensations which, properly speaking, are qualities of the mind alone.

== Series ==
In a 2009 interview, the author mentioned two further books in the series. In February 2021 Jasper Fforde announced on twitter @jasperfforde that "In March I start work on Shades of Grey II, which should be published 2023. Now, those pesky swans.."

The sequel, Red Side Story, was published in 2024. The final book in the trilogy, tentatively titled Shades of Grey III: Wild Blue Yonder, is planned to be released in 2028.
