= Ellise Chappell =

English actress (born 1992)

- Born: Ellise Chappell; 21 March 1992 (age 34); Warwickshire, England
- Education: University of Exeter
- Occupation: Actress
- Years active: 2016–present

Ellise Chappell (born 21 March 1992) is an English actress. She is best known for her roles as Morwenna Chynoweth in Poldark and as Jennifer Strange in The Last Dragonslayer.

== Early life and education ==
Chappell was born and raised in rural Warwickshire, her mother was an artist, her father runs a creative agency, while her elder brother went on to be a video choreographer. She was educated at The King's High School for Girls, a private school for girls in Warwick. After completing her time at school she applied for Royal Academy of Dramatic Art and Guildhall School of Music and Drama; however, she was unsuccessful in the applications. Instead Chappell studied English literature at the University of Sheffield, before deciding to switch to studying drama at the University of Exeter, where she graduated in 2014. She took a nine-month intensive course on acting, before moving to London, where she joined the National Youth Theatre and performed in the West End.

== Career ==
Chappell was part of the National Youth Theatre REP Company in 2015, where she starred in Wuthering Heights by Emily Brontë, The Merchant of Venice by William Shakespeare and Consensual by Evan Placey. She then landed the role of Jennifer Strange in the 2016 Sky TV series adaptation of The Last Dragonslayer, before starring as Wendy Roberts in Anthony Horowitz's BBC TV series New Blood. Chappell has also been a regular in the BBC series Poldark since its third season, playing Morwenna Chynoweth. She plays Lucy in the 2019 film Yesterday, and plays Mona in the Netflix series Young Wallander.

== Filmography ==
=== Film ===
Year	Title	Role	Notes
2019	Yesterday	Lucy	
2019	My Boy	Katy	Short film
2020	Reappear	Cristina	Short film
2025	Afterlight (First Sight)	Luna	Anthology (Short film)

=== Television ===
Year	Title	Role	Notes
2016	New Blood	Wendy Roberts	2 episodes: "Case 3: Parts 1 & 2"
2016	The Last Dragonslayer	Jennifer Strange	Television film
2017–2019	Poldark	Morwenna	Main cast (series 3–5; 25 episodes)
2020	Miss Scarlet and the Duke	Clara Simms	Series 1; episode: "Inheritance"
2020–2022	Young Wallander	Mona	Main cast (series 1 & 2; 12 episodes)
2024	Death in Paradise	Holly Portlake	Series 13; 1 episode
2024	Ridley	Amelia Mellor	Series 2; 2 episodes: "Fool for Love: Parts 1 & 2"
2024	Strike	Kea Niven	Series 6; 2 episodes: "The Ink Black Heart: Parts 1 & 2"
2025	Riot Women	Fearne	5 episodes

=== Video games ===
Year	Title	Role	Notes
2022	Deliver Us Mars	Kathy Johanson (voice)	Sequel to Deliver Us the Moon
