= The Song of the Quarkbeast =

2011 fantasy novel by Jasper Fforde

- First edition
- Author: Jasper Fforde
- Language: English
- Series: Dragonslayer
- Genre: Fantasy
- Publisher: Hodder & Stoughton
- Publication date: 10 November 2011 (Hardback)
- Publication place: UK
- Media type: Print Hardback
- Pages: 304
- ISBN: 978-1-4447-0722-9
- Preceded by: The Last Dragonslayer

The Song of the Quarkbeast is the second book in the Dragonslayer series by Jasper Fforde. It is set in an alternate world in which magic is real, but has become weakened and is also being replaced by modern technology. The setting is almost like modern Britain, except that it is split into a number of small states.

== Synopsis ==
16-year-old Jennifer Strange is still filling in for the missing manager of Kazam, an employment agency for magicians. The King orders a contest between the wizards of Kazam and their rivals iMagic, the losers to forcibly merge with the winning agency. Meantime a mysterious party is searching for a lost magic ring. Kazam's odds of winning decline as several misfortunes strike. Jennifer's efforts to find allies result in, among other things, discovery of a conspiracy.
