= One of Our Thursdays Is Missing =

2011 comic fantasy novel by Jasper Fforde

One of our Thursdays Is Missing
- Author: Jasper Fforde
- Language: English
- Series: Thursday Next
- Genre: Fantasy
- Publisher: Penguin Books
- Publication date: February 2011
- Publication place: United Kingdom
- Pages: 384
- ISBN: 978-0-670-02252-6
- Preceded by: First Among Sequels
- Followed by: The Woman Who Died a Lot

One of our Thursdays is Missing is the sixth Thursday Next book, by the British author Jasper Fforde. It was published in February 2011 in the United Kingdom and was published in March in the United States. The title is a reference to the 1942 war film One of Our Aircraft Is Missing.

== Plot ==
Literature detective Thursday Next, who has the ability to travel between the RealWorld and the BookWorld, disappears before stopping a genre war. Her BookWorld counterpart, Thursday Next, receives a call from the BookWorld Policing Agency because an unknown book narrative is falling from above. The written Thursday Next and Sprockett, a mechanical butler, attempt to discover the reason for the falling narrative and find the RealWorld Thursday Next, while The Men in Plaid try to stop them.

== Themes ==
The book has references to classic literature including works from Russia and bestsellers such as works by Charles Dickens, Enid Blyton and Samuel Pepys. The author has stated that Alice in Wonderland is an inspiration. There are parodies, jokes, and his views about books. Popularity of books by ghost writers and the publishing industry is also part of the book and the fictional universe.

== Reception ==
A Daily Express review of the sixth book in his Thursday Next series said that the novel "is pure, inspired lunacy and the funniest book you will see this year" while recommending that the previous books be read first. Sandy Amazeen of Monsters and Critics said that "Newcomers to the series should start with one of the earlier titles while fans will revel in Fforde's fiendishly twisted literary world." Matthew Seamons of Deseret News said that "if you do decide to start at the newest book, "One of our Thursdays is Missing" is definitely worth your time and your dime." Lloyd Sachs of Chicago Sun-Times said that "he doesn’t write very convincingly or naturally from a female point of view",; Paula L. Woods of the Los Angeles Times said that "it's better to suspend belief" and enjoy the fun of the novel.
