= Ennuigi =

2015 video game

- In-game screenshot
- Publisher: Lexaloffle Games
- Designer: Josh Millard
- Series: Mario (unofficial)
- Engine: PICO-8
- Platform: Web browser
- Release: August 5, 2015
- Genre: Platform
- Mode: Single player

Ennuigi (or Ennuigi 1.0) is an art, browser and fangame created using PICO-8 that combines Super Mario Bros. Ennuigi is a portmanteau of the French word "ennui" and the name of Mario's fraternal twin brother Luigi. The game was designed by Josh Millard.

== Inspiration ==
"This is a shot at a collection of ideas I had a few years ago, about looking critically at the universe of Super Mario Bros. in light of the total lack of explicit narrative in the original game in particular. Who are these strange men? What motivates them? By what right do they wreak the havoc they do on this strange place? What do they feel about where they are and what they're doing?

And so, this is one lens through which to look at all that, with Luigi, the second brother, the also-ran, as a complicit onlooker, wandering now through some fractured, rotting liminal place in this strange world, reflecting on it all in scattered fragments."

— Josh Millard

The story of Ennuigi centers on Luigi's inability to come to terms with the lack of narrative in the original game. In a Reddit thread, Millard commented "I [...] think it's a pretty weird implied narrative once you step back and look at it, and enjoyed funneling some thoughts about all that into a recharacterization of Luigi as a guy who's as legitimately confused and distressed by his strange life as you'd expect a person to be once removed from the bubble of cartoony context of the franchise."

== Gameplay ==
"Left" and "right" control "walk around," while "up" for "ruminate" and "down" for "smoke." (Note: Attributed to multiple sources:) The player cannot "jump" as, according to the game, "Jumping is not consistent with ennui!" Ennuigi is procedurally generated. It is available to play on the Pico-8 Forums.

== Reception ==
=== Character ===
Reviewers described Luigi's character in Ennuigi as "chain smoking," "depressed," "laconic," "perpetually miserable," and "an angsty teenager who just finished writing a book report about Albert Camus' The Stranger." A reviewer said "it's like Luigi read too much Derrida" while another adds "Sartre and Nietzsche too to that assessment." IndieGames.com's Joel Couture called Luigi "a man commenting on a lifetime of strange things and events beyond his control."

=== Music ===
Polygon's Owen S. Good said "That brooding chiptune will have you questioning what you've really done with your life, too." The Mary Sue's Jessica Lachenal described the music as "slow, plodding, aimless." Dangerous Minds's Martin Schneider reviewed "The slow, tinny music is a perfect complement" to the game.

=== Video game ===
In 2015, the game was received by various news publications favorably. In a review for the interactive movie video game Night Trap, TechCrunch's John Biggs recommended playing a little Ennuigi. The A.V. Club's Jennifer Billock appraised the game favorably stating "thankfully, you can play." Rock, Paper, Shotgun's Emily Gera praised the game with "It is excellent." Destructoid's Steven Hansen said it "makes for a fun, depressing little distraction as it looks literally at the cartoonish abstractions of the Mushroom Kingdom." Pajiba's Vivian Kane described it as "Luigi minus that philistine Mario, plus cigarettes and deep thoughts." Columbus Alive's Brad Keefe listed Ennuigi on their list of fictional siblings remarking "Think it wasn't hard growing up in his brother's shadow?"

The Mary Sue's Jessica Lachenal called Ennuigi a "hilarious parody." Motherboard's Emanuel Maiberg remarked while it is a "small and funny browser game," it is "not as fun to play as the original Super Mario Bros." Gamnesia's Gabriel McBride found the game as "possible interpretation" to Luigi's actions and thoughts in official games and thus "manages to be pretty amusing in the process." Boing Boing's David Pescovitz reviewed the game "excellent." GamesRadar's Sam Prell, despite the concept, implored "It's funny though, I promise." Dangerous Minds's Martin Schneider described Ennuigi as a "dreary, Beckettian video game." The Next Web's Mic Wright received the game favorably stating it "reveals the bleakness of Luigi alone time. There are no bad guys, no adventure, just smoking and moping."

In 2016, Polygon's Owen S. Good said "[Ennuigi]'s gotten some attention lately." PC Gamer's Steven Messner reviewed the game with "Where Mario games are typically upbeat and energetic, Josh Millard's reinterpretation of the Mushroom Kingdom is glum, sometimes pretentious, and sometimes wonderfully insightful." The Nerdist's Blake Rodgers said "this side-scrolling game staring Luigi is equal parts hilarious and heart-wrenching." The Boston Globe's Jesse Singal called it "a very different, very dark take on its 'Mario Bros.' source material." Wired UK described it as "a darkly amusing take on video game worlds."

== See also ==
- Super Mario Movie (2005) - A similar existential art game starring Mario
- List of metafictional works
- List of portmanteaus
- List of unofficial Mario media
