= Dark Reading Matter =

2026 comic fantasy novel by Jasper Fforde

- US cover, first edition
- Author: Jasper Fforde
- Language: English
- Series: Thursday Next
- Genre: Fantasy
- Publisher: Soho Press (US); Hodder & Stoughton (UK)
- Publication date: October 2026
- Publication place: United Kingdom
- Pages: 448
- ISBN: 9781641299541
- Preceded by: The Woman Who Died a Lot

Dark Reading Matter is the eighth and final Thursday Next book, by the British author Jasper Fforde. It was published in October 2026 by Hodder & Stoughton in the UK, and Soho Press in the US.

== Synopsis ==
Thursday and Landen are trying to decide where to go on vacation, but every time they throw a dart at a map, it only lands on Wantage, where a possible portal to hell has recently opened. Tuesday, their genius daughter, is attempting to recreate the Prose Portal from The Eyre Affair using a Reality Distortion Field, but its activation is seemingly unsuccessful. The only other method Thursday has for entering the BookWorld, the Day Player from Goliath, becomes unusable due to a faulty seal.

At her library job, Thursday learns that the Martians from The War of the Worlds are invading obscure editions of classic literature. Two Jurisfiction agents attempt to prevent her from entering the Dark Reading Matter by revealing to her that she's merely a book character; they suspect she'll try to enter the DRM because the title of her novel is Dark Reading Matter (i.e. this book). Her friend Spike Stoker, who deals with vampires, ghosts, and spirits, also shares his suspicions that the world is unrealistic, before an assassination attempt on Thursday is halted by use of a Flashback, a narrative device that can only work within text.

Home. Her companion the fictional Wing Commander finally succumbs to the rot overtaking his book and slips into the DRM, inadvertently taking Thursday with him. She escapes into a large-print version of The Great Gatsby, and fights off the Martians there. Thursday and Landen finally take their trip to Wantage.

The portal to hell, located in a Shakespeare theme park, is being exploited for money and attention by the right-wing Enid Blyton enthusiasts, who are running in the upcoming election. A man named Roger Thatt appears, claiming to be Thursday's first husband and seemingly with power over the Creator (Fforde himself) to alter the story. He attempts to recruit Thursday for his Word Engine, a machine that can scrape all human text and generate new novels, but she refuses. Thatt kills her and halts the narrative of Dark Reading Matter.

Following this is a series of excerpts from Fforde's journals as he struggles with writer's block, until he's eventually approached by Roger Thatt, offering to take the process of writing away if only Fforde will let him. Eventually Fforde does, also agreeing to Thatt's requests to write him into the DRM. Meanwhile, Thursday and her companions are hiding out in the footnoterphone conduits. (Note: A method of communication in the BookWorld through footnotes; Thursday employs a similar tactic of hiding in the conduits in The Well of Lost Plots.) (Note: I looked around in curiosity. This particular section of the tunnels hardly resembled anything else I’d seen in Fiction. The gleaming white tile and jet-black wiring brought to mind the descriptions I’d heard of Nonfiction, except that the walls lacked the baroque outcroppings usually associated with serif fonts. “What are we doing here?” I asked Ashley, who was heading up our little band. “And why was that word just now blue?" “Oh, this is just a detour; we’ll soon be back in Fiction through the linkage with Hoaxes. Causality’s been funny this whole narrative, so I wanted to ensure there was no chance of encountering yourself from The Well of Lost Plots.” “That one too!” “I believe they’re a tool of sorts in this area,” said Emperor Zhark, catching up with us. “A way of facilitating miniature BookJumps.” “Ah, here we are,” said Ashley, who’d been pressing on the wall in seemingly random spots. “Our exit. Careful now, everything might get a bit topsy-turvy as we pass through Harold Standish-”) With help from the book's readers, who can access the ISBN, she's able to BookJump into Fforde's journals and make a plan with him to stop Thatt.

Fforde sends Thursday back in time in the narrative using a Bobby Ewing “it was all a dream” plot device, and inserts a subplot into Dark Reading Matter of Goliath being undone so that Thursday will have access to Day Players, and thus the DRM. Thursday avoids the ire of Jurisfiction for using banned plot devices by pretending to end the novel, then deals with a revived Acheron Hades out for revenge at Thornfield Hall, before finally entering the DRM through the missing Chapter Thirteens of every book in the Thursday Next series.

In the DRM, Thursday finds her way to the Field of Memories, where Roger Thatt is using a Word Engine Trawler to strip the DRM of all the ideas buried there. He's being assisted in his work by a rogue Muse, Antikytheria, who oversees technology. With the help of her own forgotten memories, Thursday is able to bring the Wing Commander into this region of the DRM and destroy the Word Engine.

Thursday uses her last Day Player to enter The War of the Worlds along with a woman named Daisy ex-McKenna (deus ex machina), who has a cocktail of respiratory diseases which will cause the Martians to all die of infection soon into their invasion. However, the use of a deus ex machina still draws a harsh penalty from the Muses—a humiliating ending—which Thursday accepts with resignation. She goes back to Wantage's underworld portal to hell and pulls the mask off Mephistopheles to reveal him to be the owner of the Shakespeare park boosting sales: a Scooby-Doo ending.

== Reception ==
Response to the novel has been largely positive, both on its own merits and as a conclusion to the series. Publishers Weekly called Dark Reading Matter "an absurdist romp...a tribute to the might of the written word", and a Wall Street Journal review described the book as "witty and inventive".

Dark Reading Matter debuted at #14 on the Independent Bookshop Top 20 list.
