= Lost in a Good Book =

2002 comic fantasy novel by Jasper Fforde

- First edition
- Author: Jasper Fforde
- Language: English
- Series: Thursday Next
- Genre: Alternate history, Fantasy novel
- Publisher: Hodder & Stoughton
- Publication date: 2002
- Publication place: United Kingdom
- Media type: Print (Hardback)
- Pages: 384
- ISBN: 0-340-82283-X
- OCLC: 441651614
- Preceded by: The Eyre Affair
- Followed by: The Well of Lost Plots

Lost in a Good Book is an alternate history fantasy novel by Jasper Fforde. It won the Independent Mystery Booksellers Association 2004 Dilys Award. It is the second in the Thursday Next series.

== Synopsis ==
Lost in a Good Book is the second book by Jasper Fforde and the sequel to the first adventure of literary detective Thursday Next, The Eyre Affair. Lost in a Good Book uses a variety of literary allusions as it follows Thursday through a vast government conspiracy.

== Plot summary ==
Three months after the events of The Eyre Affair, Thursday Next is happily married to Landen Parke-Laine and working as a literary detective in Swindon. One day, Thursday meets her father, a renegade ChronoGuard, who informs her that the world's going to end in a flood of an unknown pink chemical. This is a result of one of her uncle Mycroft's inventions going out of control. Mycroft has destroyed his Prose Portal after the events of The Eyre Affair and retired, leaving the invention business in the hands of his two well-meaning but inept sons, Orville and Wilbur.

Thursday is sent with her partner, Bowden Cable, to the mansion of Lord Volescamper, a major supporter of the front-runner in the up-coming election for President. In his extensive library, they discover an original manuscript of Shakespeare's lost play Cardenio. Tests done at the station determine its authenticity, and it seems to have appeared just in time to help its discoverer, Yorrick Kaine, to win the election (thanks to the "Shakespeare vote"). When he releases the play to the general public, victory is all but guaranteed.

Thursday had marooned Jack Schitt in Edgar Allan Poe's The Raven at the end of The Eyre Affair, and his employer, The Goliath Corporation, a Big Brother-like agency which is the de facto ruler of England, wants him back. They hire a ChronoGuard agent named Lavoisier to eradicate Thursday's husband Landen from the time line, as a hostage to blackmail Thursday into retrieving Schitt. Landen vanishes, and only Thursday remembers him. But she also has physical proof—she's pregnant with their child. Without Mycroft's Prose Portal, however, she'll have to learn a new way to travel between books.

During one of her dreams, she encounters Landen in her memory, who spurs her to travel to Osaka to meet Mrs. Nakajima, a woman who's learned how to travel through books. Mrs Nakajima introduces her to bookjumping, the method by which one enters the fictional world without the Prose Portal: those with an inherent talent for it can literally read themselves into the world of fiction and Thursday does so. It turns out that there is a police force within literature (both fiction and non-fiction), Jurisfiction, which employs both fictional characters and real people ranging from the Cheshire Cat and the Red Queen to Ambrose Bierce and Voltaire, and ensures that literature continues in an orderly fashion. Next herself is apprenticed as a rookie Jurisfiction agent to Miss Havisham, the abandoned bride from Dickens' novel Great Expectations. Thursday is, however, in some legal trouble in the literary world for having changed the ending of Jane Eyre, in The Eyre Affair.

After a preliminary hearing in the Byzantine world of Kafka's The Trial and saving Abel Magwitch from drowning before the beginning of Great Expectations, Havisham and Thursday part ways and the latter character enters "The Raven" and retrieves Jack Schitt. But Goliath have no intention of keeping their word, and they trap Thursday in a Corporation warehouse without any reading material with which she can read herself out. Miss Havisham finds her there when it's discovered that the copy of Cardenio which Thursday found in the real world was stolen from the Great Library (a building where copies of every book ever written or conceived of are kept) by another literary character. Miss Havisham uses one of Thursday's clothing labels to read the pair (eventually and with great effort) back to the Great Library.

Guided through her dreams and memories by Landen, Thursday finds the event that caused the world-ending accident—or rather, the person: Aornis Hades, Acheron Hades' sister who wants revenge on Thursday for Acheron's death in The Eyre Affair. Aornis can edit people's memories so they don't remember her presence, which is why Thursday needed help from Landen to find Aornis in her own memory.

Cardenio is retrieved but Aornis escapes and now Goliath, the ChronoGuard, and SpecOps all seek to apprehend Thursday on Goliath's contrived charge of stealing corporate secrets. At the book's end, Aornis pressures Thursday to kill herself so that Aornis will prevent the world from turning into Dream Topping. Thursday's father takes her place in the nick of time and sacrifices himself as Mycroft's Dream Topping (see dream whip) making machine breaks down and begins producing the goo continuously; he takes all the Dream Topping to the dawn of Earth, where it—and he—will supply the organic nutrients needed to create life.

Afterwards, Thursday returns home and finds her father there. She is confused until she realizes that, being a time traveller, he will sacrifice himself much later in his future, even though it was just a little while ago in hers. Now that she is wanted by Goliath, the ChronoGuard, and Aornis, her father offers to place her in an alternate reality for a while (it is ironically implied that this is our reality) while she gives birth to Landen's baby. Refusing her father's offer, Thursday travels to a book in the Well of Lost Plots—a subdivision of the Great Library that contains unpublished and unfinished works—in order to take a year's maternity leave with her memory of Landen. She establishes a home in a moored flying boat (a Short Sunderland), after trading places with the plucky sidekick sergeant of a police procedural mystery; it is implied that this is Sergeant Mary Mary, from one of Fforde's other works, The Big Over Easy.

== Characters ==
- Thursday Next
- Brik Schitt-Hawse
- Landen Parke-Laine
- Akrid Snell
- Mycroft Next
- Wednesday Next
- Polly Next
- Thursday's Father
- Miss Havisham
- Cordelia Flakk: Spec Ops PR Agent
- Victor Analogy: Head of Swindon LiteraTechs
- Agent "Spike" Stoker: SO17 Agent, friend of Thursday, pays her 600 quid to help him for one night
- Joffy Next: Thursday's Brother.
- Bowden Cable: Thursday's partner in Swindon

== Reception ==
Lost in a Good Book has been positively received by critics. SF Site compared Fforde to both Douglas Adams and Terry Pratchett and called Lost in a Good Book "a light-hearted and delightful farce", while Salon called it "as sweet and light as the promise of spring".
