= Plus-Tech Squeeze Box =

Japanese musical duo

- Origin: Shibuya, Tokyo, Japan
- Genres: Pico-pico
- Years active: 1997–present
- Label: STUBBIE RECORDS (a.k.a. Vroom Sound)
- Members: Tomonori Hayashibe; Takeshi Wakiya

Plus-Tech Squeeze Box are a Japanese electronic duo formed by Tomonori Hayashibe and Takeshi Wakiya.

The frenetic sound of their first album FAKEVOX (2000) is driven by rudimentary synthesized sounds and heavily manipulated samples from a variety of sources, including jazz, big band, light music, MOR, and funk recordings ranging from the late-50s to the mid-70s. Junko Kamada provides vocals throughout the album.

Their second album, CARTOOOM!, was released in 2004. Junko Kamada is conspicuously absent, having parted ways with the band. Instead, sampled vocals and a variety of guest singers are used.

They created a side project with the vocalist Tomomi Matsuda called Tropico Q in 2010. The group did covers of classic rock songs.

== Notable appearances ==
They have been featured in Coca-Cola and Powerade commercials in the United Kingdom, using the song "early RISER". They also appeared on BBC Three's Adam and Joe Go Tokyo and for The SpongeBob SquarePants Movie – Music from the Movie and More.... One of their songs, including Baby P was featured on Pop'n Music 14 FEVER. They also wrote and recorded the theme tune for Pucca, which is similar to that of "early RISER". Their song "TEST ROOM" was featured in Dance Dance Revolution Universe in 2007.

== Discography ==
- FAKEVOX (2000)
- CARTOOOM! (2004)
