= The Woman Who Died a Lot =

2012 comic fantasy novel by Jasper Fforde

The Woman Who Died A Lot
- Cover of The Woman Who Died a Lot, first edition
- Author: Jasper Fforde
- Language: English
- Series: Thursday Next
- Genre: Fantasy
- Publisher: Hodder & Stoughton
- Publication date: July 2012
- Publication place: United Kingdom
- Pages: 400
- ISBN: 978-0-670-02502-2
- Preceded by: One of Our Thursdays Is Missing
- Followed by: Dark Reading Matter

The Woman Who Died A Lot is the seventh Thursday Next book, by the British author Jasper Fforde. It was published in July 2012; set in an alternative world where love of novels and plays is at the heart of modern society, it takes place in a fictional version of Swindon.

== Synopsis ==
Thursday Next is now in her early 50s, and is recovering in the Outland from injuries sustained at the end of One of Our Thursdays Is Missing. The Global Standard Deity begins to threaten to smite Swindon, and the solution lies with Thursday's daughter, Tuesday. Thursday also comes under attack from Aornis Hades once more, causing a reappearance of her non-existent third child, Jenny. The Goliath Corporation are on the rise once more, taking advantage of a dangerously low National Stupidity Index resultant from years of rule by the CommonSense Party.

== Reception ==
Some critical reception for The Woman Who Died a Lot has been positive. The Plain Dealer praised the work, writing "By the end, all of Fforde's myriad particles of plot, accelerated by his immense skill and narrative sense, collide, producing pyrotechnics and a passel of new particles to propel his next tale." DNA India also gave a favorable review but stated that the book would not be a "breezy read, particularly if you are not familiar with Fforde’s version of the world." The Express was more mixed in their review, as they enjoyed the book but felt that some readers might not find the book as satisfying as earlier entries. A more academic reception of the novel has put forward its engagement with feminist transhuman embodiments in contemporary science-fiction.
