= Celestial Dogs =

1996 novel by Jay Russell

Celestial Dogs is a novel by American writer Jay Russell, published by Raven Books in 1996.

== Plot summary ==
Celestial Dogs is a novel in which private detective Marty Burns is contracted by a pimp to locate a missing prostitute.

== Reception ==
Gideon Kibblewhite reviewed Celestial Dogs for Arcane magazine, rating it a 6 out of 10 overall. Kibblewhite comments that "The trick the book tries to pull off is the marrying of pulp fiction with the supernatural. Unfortunately, however readable, it doesn't quite work. You are left at the finish with the feeling that it's just another detective story after all - no matter how many demons are involved."

Kirkus Reviews states "Newcomer Russell asks you to accept an awful lot of dumb luck and demonic samurai for the dubious satisfactions he provides."

Publishers Weekly stated: "Crudely written and lacking credibility, this brutal tale gives a view of Hollywood that is simpleminded, wrong-headed and dated all at once."

== Reviews ==
- Review by Andy Mills (1996) in Vector 187
- Review by Don D'Ammassa (1996) in Science Fiction Chronicle, #190 October 1996
- Review by Russell Letson (1997) in Locus, #433 February 1997
