= Fakevox =

Studio album by Plus-Tech Squeeze Box
- Released: September 15, 2000 (Japan); January 7, 2002 (UK); April 13, 2005 (Japan)
- Recorded: 2000
- Genres: Electronic, shibuya-kei
- Length: 32 minutes
- Languages: English, with some Japanese
- Labels: Vroom Sound Records (Japan); Sur la Page (UK)
- Producers: Plus-Tech Squeeze Box; Hirofumi Shimada

Plus-Tech Squeeze Box chronology
Fakevox (2000)	Cartooom! (2004)

Alternative cover
- English release album cover

Professional ratings
Review scores
Source	Rating
Allmusic	4/5 stars

Fakevox (stylised in all caps) is the debut album by Japanese electronic music band Plus-Tech Squeeze Box, which was released in Japan on September 15, 2000, and in the United Kingdom on January 7, 2002. It was later re-released in Japan on April 15, 2005 with a different bonus track and included a music video.

== Track listing ==
Original Japanese release

1. "Channel No.17"
2. "Early RISER"
3. "A Day in the Radio"
4. "Test Room"
5. "Rocket coaster"
6. "Scene1-launch a spaceship into space →"
7. "☆"
8. "White Drops"
9. "MILK TEA"
10. "Scene2-citybilly lived happily ever after →"
11. "Sneaker Song!"
12. "Clover"
13. "Rocket coaster (Fab Cushion Remix)"
14. "A Day in the Radio (micro mach machine Remix)"

English release

1. "Channel No.17"
2. "Early Riser"
3. "A Day in the Radio"
4. "Test Room"
5. "Rocket Coaster"
6. "Scene 1-Launch a Spaceship Into Space"
7. "☆"
8. "White Drops"
9. "Milk Tea"
10. "Scene 2-Citybilly Lived Happily Ever After"
11. "Sneaker Song"
12. "Clover"

Japanese re-release (2005) [VMSD-007]

1. "Channel No.17" (1:17)
2. "early RISER" (2:48)
3. "A Day in the Radio" (3:34)
4. "Test Room" (3:45)
5. "rocket coaster" (3:05)
6. "Scene1-launch a spaceship into space →" (0:28]
7. "☆" (4:12)
8. "White Drops" (3:05)
9. "MILK TEA" (3:19)
10. "Scene2-citybilly lived happily after →" (1:03)
11. "Sneaker Song!" (3:43)
12. "clove" (2:36)
13. "kitchen shock → (Pancake Partymix)" (5:17) [Bonus track]

Bonus Video Clip: "early RISER"
