= The Fourth Bear =

2006 novel by Jasper Fforde

- UK Hardback Cover
- Author: Jasper Fforde
- Language: English
- Series: Nursery Crimes
- Genre: Fantasy / Mystery
- Publisher: Hodder & Stoughton
- Publication date: 10 July 2006 (Hardback)
- Publication place: UK
- Media type: Print (Hardback & Paperback)
- Pages: 400
- ISBN: 0-340-83570-2 (UK Hardback)
- OCLC: 73950031
- Preceded by: The Big Over Easy
- Followed by: The Last Great Tortoise Race

The Fourth Bear is a mystery/fantasy novel by Jasper Fforde published in July 2006. It is Jasper Fforde's sixth novel, and the second in the Nursery Crimes series (also known as the Jack Spratt series). It continues the story of Detective Inspector Jack Spratt from The Big Over Easy.

== Plot ==
DCI Jack Spratt heads the Berkshire Nursery Crime Division, handling all inquiries involving nursery rhyme characters and other PDRs (persons of dubious reality). After doubts arise concerning his handling of the Great Red-Legg'd Scissorman's arrest and the Red Riding Hood affair, he is suspended pending a mental health review. His DS Mary Mary promises to consult him on all cases, to bypass the suspension. They begin an investigation of porridge-smuggling by anthropomorphic bears.

Jack's troubles increase when the argumentative Punches move in next door and his son adopts a sly and sticky-fingered pet. He is forced to reveal to his shocked wife that he is himself a PDR. Furthermore, his psychiatrist is particularly sceptical about his claim that his new car repairs itself when no one is watching, and the car salesman who can prove his sanity cannot be found. His self-esteem is somewhat restored when the newspaperman who has been hounding him begs Jack's help in finding his missing sister "Goldilocks". It seems she was working on an explosive story involving cucumber growers.

Meanwhile, the Gingerbreadman, the notorious murderous biscuit (or possibly cake, occasionally cookie) escapes custody, leaving a trail of bodies; Jack is frustrated when the case is given to an unimaginative officer outside NCD. While Jack and Mary are making enquiries about Goldilocks, they twice encounter the fugitive biscuit, but fail to capture him.

It emerges that Goldilocks was involved in the porridge-smuggling after her body is discovered in the grim theme park SommeWorld. Jack begins to suspect the Gingerbreadman is a hired assassin and attempts to question the Quangle-Wangle, a reclusive industrialist. The solution to the mystery involves secret industrial and government conspiracies and the mysterious Fourth bear...

After more investigations Jack comes across a cottage of three bears who knew Goldilocks. They say that she ate the little bear's porridge and broke his bed, like the rhyme. He also makes investigations into Ursine Developments, the flats for bears. You came across these at the start of the book when Jack caught them smuggling oats into the flats for oat addicts. This is illegal for bears to eat as well as marmalade, honey, and large amounts of porridge, as they have the same effect as drugs.

== Nursery rhyme/literary references ==
- Jack Sprat
- Mary, Mary, Quite Contrary
- The Gingerbread Man
- Goldilocks and the Three Bears
- Peter Piper
- Prometheus
- The Tempest
- Punch and Judy
- "The Quangle-Wangle's Hat" by Edward Lear
- Thursday Next
- Struwwelpeter
- Dorian Gray
- The Fall of the House of Usher
