= Jay Russell (writer) =

American novelist (born 1961)

Jay Russell (born 1961) is an American-born, UK-based author of crime, horror and fantasy fiction. He is the creator of Marty Burns, a supernatural detective, who has appeared in a series of novels and short stories beginning with Celestial Dogs. Russell's fiction is typified by a mixing of genre elements, often overlaid with a comic sensibility.

Russell was born in Queens County in New York City. He attended Cornell University. He later attended the University of Southern California, receiving a doctorate in communications.

He currently teaches creative writing at the esteemed St Mary's University, Twickenham.

== Bibliography ==
- Celestial Dogs (1996)
- Blood (1996)
- Burning Bright (1997)
- Waltzes and Whispers (1999)
- Greed & Stuff (2001)
- Brown Harvest (2001)
- Twilight Zone: Memphis/The Pool Guy (2004)
- Apocalypse Now, Voyager (2005)
- If Happy little bluebirds fly
