= Early Riser (novel) =

Novel by Jasper Fforde

- Early Riser (UK 2018 Edition)
- Author: Jasper Fforde
- Cover artist: Robert Frank Hunter
- Country: United Kingdom
- Language: English
- Genre: alternate history, fantasy, science fiction, satire
- Publisher: Hodder & Stoughton (UK); Viking Press (US)
- Published: 2 August 2018 (UK); 12 February 2019 (US)
- Media type: Print (hardcover)

Early Riser (2018) is a standalone alternate history satire novel of novelist Jasper Fforde.

== Plot ==
The story takes place in an alternate version of the United Kingdom, where the Ice Age continues and most of the human population hibernates in winter. Returning early from hibernation may cause Dead in Sleep from neural collapse, but death during hibernation may also arise from a shortage of fats, low temperature, vermin predation, carbon dioxide build-up, calcitic migration and many other complications. Some people awake with only enough vestigial memory to walk and eat, and became known as "nightwalkers".

As the novel opens, people's survivability during hibernation has dramatically increased after the introduction of Morphenox, a drug produced by HiberTech, a large and powerful "vertically integrated" corporation. HiberTech also "takes care" of nightwalkers, "redeploying" those who are suitable for performing simple tasks and supervising "transplant potential" of others.

Their Winter Consul Service is responsible for the safety of dreaming people. The main protagonist, Charlie Worthing, is a novice within the service and the story begins as they prepare for their first season as a member of the Winter Consul. Over the course of the winter, the Consul Service discovers an outbreak of viral dreams that, while not believed to be a serious concern at first, inevitably builds into a widespread emergency that endangers every Sleeper.

== Reception ==
Early Riser was listed 10th in the New York Times Best-Seller Books Hardcover Fiction on 3 March 2019.

"As Charlie uncovers a conspiracy connected with a viral dream, Fforde keeps the puns and neologisms coming thick and fast while exploring every facet of his novel’s intriguing premise." - James Lovegrove, Financial Times (30 November 2018)

"Early Riser is a zany send-up of all things British and an often hilarious account of Charlie’s stumbling, hare-brained attempts to work out the secret of the authoritarian HiberTech company." - Eric Brown, The Guardian (7 September 2018)

"Early Riser has all of the elements and sensibility that have earned Fforde a sizable and devoted following: wordplay, allusion, a playful exuberance and -- of course -- his signature method of World-Building via Copious and Suggestive Use of Capitalization, often in the service of creating Imaginary Socioeconomic Hierarchies and Related Governmental Agencies. (...) Fforde writes witty, chewy sentences, full of morsels, and delivers them deadpan. (...) It’s not so much that the book is less than the sum of its parts. It’s just that there are so many parts. Early Riser, while never underwritten, can be at times a bit underfelt, the verbal dexterity crowding out the room for emotion." - Charles Yu, The New York Times Book Review (28 February 2019)
