= Robert Grudin =

American writer and philosopher (born 1938)

- Born: 11 March 1938 (age 88)
- Education: Harvard University; University of California, Berkeley (PhD)
- Occupations: Writer; philosopher
- Writing career
- Genre: Metafiction
- Website: sites.google.com/site/rgrudin/

Robert Grudin (11 March 1938 in New Jersey – 5 October 2026 in California) was an American writer and philosopher.

== Life ==
Grudin graduated from Harvard, and earned a Ph.D. in comparative literature from the University of California, Berkeley in 1969. He received a Guggenheim Fellowship for 1992–1993. Until 1998 he was a professor of English at the University of Oregon. He has written about many political and philosophical themes including liberty, determinism, creativity, and several others.

== Career ==
Grudin was the author of the metafictional novel Book. He has also written Mighty Opposites: Shakespeare and Renaissance Contrariety, The Grace of Great Things: Creativity and Innovation (finalist for the 1991 Oregon Book Award), On Dialogue: An Essay in Free Thought, Time and the Art of Living, The Most Amazing Thing, and, most recently, American Vulgar: The Politics of Manipulation Versus the Culture of Awareness.

== Bibliography ==
=== Fiction ===
- Book: A Novel (1992) (ISBN 0-6794-1185-2)
- The Most Amazing Thing (2001) (ISBN 0-9658-9951-9)

=== Non-fiction ===
- Mighty Opposites: Shakespeare and Renaissance Contrariety (1979) (ISBN 0-5200-3666-2)
- Time and the Art of Living (1982) (ISBN 0-0625-0355-3)
- The Grace of Great Things: Creativity and Innovation (1990) (ISBN 0-8991-9940-2)
- On Dialogue: An Essay in Free Thought (1996) (ISBN 0-8991-9940-2)
- American Vulgar: The Politics of Manipulation Versus the Culture of Awareness (2006) (ISBN 1-5937-6102-3)
- "Boccaccio's 'Decameron' and the Ciceronian Renaissance" co-authored with Michaela Paasche Grudin" (2012) (ISBN 978-0-230-34112-8)
- "Design and Truth" (2010) (ISBN 978-0-300-16140-3)

== See also ==
- American philosophy
- List of American philosophers
