= The Well of Lost Plots =

2003 comic fantasy novel by Jasper Fforde

- First edition
- Author: Jasper Fforde
- Language: English
- Series: Thursday Next
- Genre: Alternate history, Fantasy novel
- Publisher: Hodder and Stoughton
- Publication date: 2003
- Publication place: United Kingdom
- Media type: Print (Hardback & Paperback)
- Pages: 360 (HB)
- ISBN: 0-340-82596-0 (HB)
- OCLC: 59342434
- Dewey Decimal: 823/.914 22
- LC Class: PR6106.F67 W45 2003
- Preceded by: Lost in a Good Book
- Followed by: Something Rotten

The Well of Lost Plots is a novel by Jasper Fforde, published in 2003. It is the third book in the Thursday Next series, after The Eyre Affair and Lost in a Good Book.

== Plot summary ==
Apprentice Jurisfiction agent and SpecOps-27 operative Thursday Next is taking a vacation inside Caversham Heights, a never-published detective novel inside the titular Well of Lost Plots, while waiting for her child to be born. In the book, she encounters two Generics, students of St Tabularasa's who have yet to be assigned to a book, and DCI Jack Spratt, a detective who partners with her in investigating a murder. Since Thursday is an "Outlander", a "real" person rather than a fictional character, Spratt hopes that she will help them appeal to the Council of Genres to prevent the disassembling of Caversham Heights, a fate inevitable for books which languish unpublished in the real world.

Using Caversham Heights as her base of operations, Thursday continues her apprenticeship with Miss Havisham from Great Expectations. Meanwhile, fictional character Yorrick Kaine is loose in Thursday's real world and conspiring with someone in Text Grand Central, the final arbitrators of plot, setting, and other story elements, to release BOOK version 9, code-named UltraWord. UltraWord is touted at a Jurisfiction meeting as the greatest advance "since the invention of movable type" because it creates a thirty-two plot story system and allows the reader to control the story.

Thursday slowly loses her memory of Landen, though Gran Next remains with her and keeps her from forgetting him completely. In doing so, she also battles Aornis Hades, the villainess, who nearly converted the world to Dream Topping in Lost in a Good Book, who is present in her memory as a mindworm. Thursday learns that Harris Tweed, Kaine's partner, is masquerading as a Jurisfiction agent to get UltraWord released, which he states will "fix literature". She investigates the details of UltraWord and makes some alarming discoveries.

At the 923rd Annual BookWorld awards, Thursday demonstrates a variety of issues with UltraWord; it makes books impossible to read more than three times, thus rendering libraries and second-hand bookstores useless, and the quality of the writing is also substantively poorer. Tweed and Kaine call for a vote before the audience can be convinced by Thursday's argument. In this unprecedented emergency, Thursday uses her Jurisfiction operative TravelBook to summon The Great Panjandrum, ruler of the BookWorld and literal deus ex machina. The Panjandrum calls for an immediate vote which goes against UltraWord and calls on Thursday to take the job of Bellman, the superintendent of Jurisfiction. Thursday accepts the position.

In the aftermath of the BookWorld awards, the two Generics, now calling themselves Randolph and Lola, Thursday, and her pet dodo Pickwick retire to Caversham Heights, which was bought by the Council of Genres as a character sanctuary, a solution that appeals to the residents of the novel as well as the nursery rhyme characters who were going to go on strike. The story of the new Caversham Heights constitutes Fforde's fifth book, The Big Over Easy.

The American edition has an extra chapter at the end, documenting the weathering of a WordStorm during Thursday's tenure as Bellman.

== Characters ==
- Thursday Next - Jurisfiction detective and protagonist of the series.
- Pickwick - Thursday's pet dodo.
- Randolph and Lola - a pair of generic characters who Thursday assists in developing distinct identities.
- Harris Tweed - A Jurisfiction agent from the real world.
- The Great Panjandrum - the supposed creator of the Bookworld and a literal deus ex machina.
- Aornis Hades - a duplicate of the villain of the previous novel, Lost in a Good Book, who exists inside Thursday's memories and attempts to alter them to destructive effect.
- Gran Next - Thursday's grandmother, she comes to stay with her inside Caversham Heights and assist her in battling Aornis and recovering her lost memories.
- Landen Parke-Laine - Thursday's husband, a noted novelist, who at the time of The Well of Lost Plots has been erased from history by the Chronoguard and exists only in her memories.
- The Bellman - the head of Jurisfiction.

== Reception ==
The Well of Lost Plots was released to positive reviews. Rich Horton of The SF Site referred to it as "a fast-moving, funny, and intellectually diverting novel" and Dave Golder of SFX stated that "a book this self-consciously clever has no right being so much damned fun" and rated it five stars. The Chicago Sun-Times described it as "a wildly imaginative, pun-filled bundle of literary allusions, satire, criticism and delightful silliness." Fforde won the Wodehouse prize for comic fiction in 2004 for The Well of Lost Plots.
