= The Big Over Easy =

2005 novel written by Jasper Fforde

- First edition (UK)
- Author: Jasper Fforde
- Language: English
- Series: Nursery Crimes
- Genre: Fantasy
- Publisher: Hodder & Stoughton
- Publication date: 11 July 2005
- Publication place: UK
- Media type: Print (Hardback & Paperback)
- ISBN: 0-340-83567-2 (UK Hardback)
- OCLC: 58828122
- Followed by: The Fourth Bear

The Big Over Easy is a 2005 detective novel written by Jasper Fforde. It and its sequel The Fourth Bear are set in an alternate reality of Reading where it has the only police department that deals with PDRs (Person of Dubious Reality), characters mainly from nursery rhymes and fairy tales.

According to the events of The Well of Lost Plots, the Nursery Crime series is the result of Caversham Heights becoming a "textual summer camp" for mainly nursery rhyme characters (or Orals) since they cannot benefit from the Character Exchange Program. The book also includes a cameo of Thursday and Bowden related to when they fixed a temporal distortion in The Eyre Affair.

Who Killed Humpty Dumpty? (the book's first iteration) was the first novel Fforde wrote in 1994, however it was repeatedly rejected while the first four Thursday Next books were being published. It was made into the WOLP subplot Caversham Heights as "a highly unsubtle way of [Fforde] trying to get [his] first book, Nursery Crime, into print", though what made it get rewritten and published in 2005 was Fforde "looking for another book to publish" and him thinking that "the Humpty novel... would be able to find a readership".

== Plot ==
The book begins on a rainy day the week after Easter. Mary Mary, a Detective Sergeant from Basingstoke, has been transferred to the Reading Central Police Station. She hopes to be paired up with DCI Friedland Chymes, the 2nd-best Inspector in the Guild of Detectives and her childhood idol, but instead is paired up with DI Jack Spratt from the Nursery Crime Division, an inspector who isn't even rated by Amazing Crime Stories. Jack himself is living with his second wife, Madeleine, who moonlights as a photographer for certain prestigious events, and their five children: Pandora, Ben, Jerome, Megan, and Stevie. Madeleine is trying to rent the spare room in the house, but without much success.

The next day, Humpty Dumpty is discovered dead outside of his residence at Grimm's Road, apparently having fallen off the wall. Once Jack arrives to the crime scene, his Superintendent, Briggs, introduces him to Mary Mary. Jack interviews some possible witnesses, including Wee Willie Winkie, the insomniac neighbor; Ms. Hubbard, the owner of the boarding house where Humpty stayed; and Prometheus, the titan from Greek mythology, the latter of which Jack offers to rent the spare room in his house to. They all describe Humpty as a nice egg, who generally kept to himself. Upon inspection of Humpty's room, Jack and Mary find some odd clues: several shares in Spongg Footcare, Reading's Footcare empire, a picture of Humpty with a girlfriend in Vienna, and a 28-foot-long strand of hair. They later interview Laura, Humpty Dumpty's ex-wife. When Jack returns home, he tells his mother that the painting of the cow his mother wanted to sell was fake and he only received some beans in return. Mrs. Spratt retorts that she had the painting valued years ago and that the auctioneer probably knows how incredibly valuable it is. She is so upset that she throws the beans out of the window, and Jack sees them bury into the ground by themselves.

There is another interview at a hospital called Saint Cerebellum's, this time with mad scientist doctor Quatt, and on their way to meeting her Jack notices the serial killer the 'Gingerbread Man'. Jack had been chasing the killer in previous cases and had to witness his colleague having his arms ripped off, only for the local newspaper, the Gadfly, to say that Chymes had caught the 'Gingerbread Man'. The interview with Dr. Quatt only reveals that she was Humpty's doctor. The conversation ends with Quatt showing Jack and Mary her latest experiment, a kitten's head sewn onto the body of a haddock.

A few days later, Jack and Mary team up with Superintendent Baker, Ashley (an alien who can only speak binary code) and forensic scientist Gretel Kandlestyck-Maeker. Humpty Dumpty's wife is found to have committed suicide at the biscuit factory, but it is suspected that she has been murdered. The woman had jumped into a chocolate vat and was sliced by the machines, but when the employees stopped the machine, it was too late. The police of the Nursery Crime Division find a suicide note, but Mary concludes that it was written by his wife by comparing it to her diary. The proof of suicide also comes from a witnessing employee who saw her jump in, and no one pushed her.

A few days later, the team are called in to investigate the recent death of Wee Willie Winkie. He was attacked with a large weapon, supposedly a broadsword, and a fifty-pound note was found in his hand, showing he was blackmailing the killer. Jack has his own problems at home when his mother calls him to sell a painting of a cow.

Jack next interviews Randolph Spongg. Humpty had been investing in their failing businesses in hope of a breakthrough, which never came. The interview take place in Spongg's strange house, where doors lead nowhere, some rooms revolve around and go-kart races inside the house itself are held commonly every year. They next interview Lola Vavoom, who lives in the room next to Humpty Dumpty in the block of flats. At the end of the conversation she tells them that Humpty's shower had been running for a whole year, before his death. The two men break the door, and Baker finds a skeleton in the shower.

The man is identified as Tom Thomm, son of a local flautist. His skin has been washed away by the shower water, and his skeleton is badly damaged. There are also five bullet holes in the shower curtain, three at waist height and two at foot height. Gretel says that when Tom was shot in the waist, he fell on the floor, where the two other shots hit his head. Jack then realises that Tom's killer was Humpty's wife: the three waist-height shots would have been head height for Humpty. His wife killed herself as she was sorry for what she had done.

Jack is interviewed by colleagues, and Friedland Chymes appears and warns Spratt that if he does not give the case to Chymes, he will be fired. Jack accepts that that may happen, and refuses to give the case away. Later on, they have a meeting with another industrialist, Solomon Grundy, whose wife is Rapunzel. When she takes off her hat and her hair falls to the ground, Spratt and Mary remember the 28-foot-long strand of hair found in Humpty's bedroom. Solomon shows them into a room with an abnormally large amount of security: a person going in has to wear no shoes in case of being detected. In the centre of the room is a puzzle piece, the sacred gonga, held in unbreakable glass. It has magic powers which he reveals to Jack and Mary by putting them on each side of the room. When Jack thinks of a number, Mary says it out loud. This was so amazing that Solomon decided to put it on display for everyone in Reading.

When an inspector is put in charge of watching Spratt and the others, Humpty's car, a Ford Zephyr, is found. As the car is about to be taken away, Jack realises that the front headlight has been removed and there is a wire feeding through it. He orders everyone to run away and the car explodes. Spratt and Mary then interview a woman who was divorced from Humpty. The woman claims that she killed Humpty out of jealousy by putting three poisonous tablets in his coffee. Jack then tells her that Humpty was shot, not poisoned, and that she is therefore innocent.

When Jack returns home, he notices a huge crowd of people around the house. His mother says that the beans that were thrown from the window had grown into a huge stalk. She has even made arrangements for the magical celebrity, the Jellyman, to see it when he arrives in Reading. Jack is told by Gretel that Humpty Dumpty was shot by someone from behind, which smashed through his shell and burst the albumen, sending a shock which cracked the whole egg.

When Mary, Spratt and the inspector enter Humpty's house, they wonder how Humpty got his money: he had no proper job and all he did was invest in failing companies. Their question is answered when they discover on the sofa a goose that lays golden eggs. On a further inspection, a giant verruca is found on another sofa. Jack then remembers a strange doctor, Horatio Carbuncle, who always made living things like the verruca. He killed Humpty Dumpty because he was investing in a company which got rid of verrucas. Humpty's wife killed herself because she thought that she had killed him, and Wee Willie Winkie was killed because he was blackmailing him. Jack is not sure about Tom, but thought the evidence is good enough. Mary then calls him into the next room and shows him the body of Carbuncle, shot dead.

Jack then remembers the verruca and the puzzle piece. If Randolph was the killer, he would have the best motive so that he could put the verruca under the floor of Solomon's room. Hundreds of people would come in bare-footed to see the puzzle piece, and the verruca would give off a gas which would infect all the people's feet with verrucas. They would turn to the only foot care product, made by Randolph Spongg, and the failing company would make thousands.

Jack is told that the man who shot Humpty was employed by Solomon Grundy, but Jack knows that Solomon is not the killer and sets off to find the real one, Randolph Spongg. Arriving at the house, the butler asks him to remove his mobile. The room becomes strange and starts to revolve. Jack enters a normal room with a mirror next, but he cannot see himself in the reflection. He sees Randolph and Lola come out of a trapdoor, and turns round, but sees no one. Randolph explains that this is his magic. Lola says that she is happy that Humpty is dead in the Ford Zephyr and reveals that she loves Randolph. Behind the two, the butler comes out of the trapdoor, but to Jack's surprise the butler is behind him. Jack is confused as he is standing in front of a mirror and cannot see his reflection, but that of Randolph and Lola, and the butler is the only one with a reflection. Randolph puts a sandwich with tin foil inside on a table and shines a lamp on it. He explains that the sandwich will crumple up under the heat, and when the corners of the tin foil touch, the house will explode. When they leave, Jack realises that it is not a mirror at all, but glass. He breaks it and finds a room on the other side, made exactly backwards. The butler had a twin brother who appeared on the other side, looking like he had a reflection. Jack stops the bomb, but the killers escape in a plane. After talking to Mary, he thinks that the car bomb was not intended for them, but for Humpty. He gets this idea because Lola said that Humpty died in the Zephyr, so was hoping he would be killed in it.

Moments later, Jack is informed by Singh that Humpty survived the shot, and that instead, he hatched, because Dr. Quatt secretly fertilized him six months ago. The team then splits up so they can arrest Quatt and find reports on a giant chicken running wild per Jack's request. Mary and Jack then arrive at his mother's house where, unbeknownst to them, the Jellyman was having a private viewing of the beanstalk. Jack is the only one let in by an officer later named Vaughn and meets up with Granny Spratt, Madeleine, Jack's kids, and The Jellyman himself. During the chat between Jack and the Jellyman, Jack realizes two things: Winkie was trying to blackmail Quatt and what came out of Humpty was intended to be used against The Jellyman, the person who ruined her career. He immediately gets his family into his mother's cellar (because he assumes the white van he saw earlier outside belongs to Quatt), gets Vaughn to radio others about the van, and Chymes opens the front door due to the commotion. A moment later a burst of gunfire is heard, prompting him to come inside and shut the door. Five more shots ring out and then an officer named Baines is let in. Chymes devises a plan to get The Jellyman to the limo parked outside, but comes up with a new one to put him in the cellar after witnessing the Humpty-beast swiftly murder an officer. The Jellyman protests against the idea and Chymes makes a new plan to "coordinate the backup response from... somewhere else", ultimately fleeing from the house. Moments later the Humpty-beast breaks in through the kitchen door, kills Vaughn and Baines, and sets its sights on The Jellyman. Jack then utilizes Humpty's fears to lure the beast outside after proving his theory correct. (Note: On pages 374-375, Jack gambles on a theory he had to save the Jellyman and yells out Humpty's name to the Humpty-beast. The Humpty-beast pauses for a moment, as if it recognized the name, and continues to walk towards the Jellyman.)

Once outside, Jack starts to climb the beanstalk, the Humpty-beast tailing close behind. When they get to the top, Jack loses his footing and plummets all the way to the potting shed, his fall being softened by the three bags of wool established earlier. When Jack regains consciousness, he rummages through the wreckage to find his father's chainsaw. He takes it and begins hacking down the beanstalk, aiming for the beast to fall down with it. Before he could make the final cut, Dr. Quatt fires a shot and stops the chainsaw. She and Jack then have a back-and-forth related to how Quatt justified her revenge and what she did to Humpty. Before she can get into the details of what she did to free the Humpty-beast, Mary knocks her unconscious with a shovel. The beast runs to her aid, picking her up and running away. Mary tries to kill them, but Jack tells her not to bother. Moments later the beanstalk topples over, crushing the Humpty-beast and Dr. Quatt.

At the end of the book, Jack explains to Mary who actually killed Humpty. Bessie Brooks thought she killed him by poisoning the coffee he didn't drink, Mrs. Dumpty thought she shot him in the shower a year ago, Randolph and Lola thought they killed him with a car bomb in his abandoned Zephyr, Grundy thought the hitman he hired dealt the final blow. Even Dr. Quatt, who used him as an incubator for her revenge plan, didn't fully kill him. (Note: If Humpty was fully gone, the Humpty-beast wouldn't have reacted to his name, the broken eggs, the mongoose threat, or the naming of egg dishes.) The real killer was Jack, who chopped the beanstalk that squashed what was left of Humpty.

== Characters in "The Big Over Easy" ==
- DI Jack Spratt: the head of the Nursery Crime Division and a tired man with a heart of gold. His name is a reference to the Jack Sprat rhyme but the character also fulfills the role of Jack in Jack and the Beanstalk and Jack the Giant Killer.
- DS Mary Mary: A professional sergeant "who gets swept away by her own ambition" and (reluctantly) is the newest officer of the NCD. She gets her name from Mary, Mary, Quite Contrary.
- van Dumpty, Humperdinck Jehoshaphat Aloysius Stuyvesant (Humpty Dumpty): "a hopeless and very charming philanderer who was much loved by the ladies".
- Constable Charlie Baker: The NCD's "office terrier" and the station's surprisingly healthy hypochondriac. He, Gretel, and Jack's previous sidekick Alan Butcher get their last names from Three Men in a Tub. It's also stated in the second book that he and Gretel are occasional members of the division.
- Constable Ashley: The first (and only) Rambosian police officer in the force. He took the job because "the filing is to die for". He's developed more in the second book.
- Constable the Baroness Gretel Leibnitz von Kandlestyck-Maeker: A "specialist in forensic accountancy" who helps the NCD when they're short-staffed. She changes her last name to Brown-Horrocks after marrying Brown-Horrocks in-between books.
- Mrs Gladys Singh: An assistant pathologist who's taking up NCD work since the chief pathologist doesn't want to risk being ridiculed. She and Jack are seemingly good friends.
- Superintendent Geoffrey Briggs: Jack and Chymes' superior, who tries to become more interesting so that he's mentioned in the latter's stories. He picked up the trombone (though he doesn't play it well) and threatened to change his surname to Föngotskilérnie.
- DCI Friedland Chymes: The Guild of Detective's second best Inspector who is unironically described as "an alpha of alpha males." He and Jack used to work in the NCD together before he was promoted out shortly after he took credit for capturing the Gingerbreadman.
- William Winkie: The narcoleptic neighbour of Humpty Dumpty. He blackmailed the killer and was killed.
- Mrs. Hubbard: The owner of the boarding house where Humpty Dumpty lived.

== Release details ==
- 11 July 2005, Hodder & Stoughton Ltd, ISBN 0-340-83567-2, hardback

== Critical reception ==
Reviewing the book for UK Sunday newspaper The Observer, Peter Guttridge began by writing, "I'm not sure what it says about the mystery genre that pretty much the only unflawed, untroubled, morally unambiguous policeman around is a nursery rhyme character". He added, "Now humour is notoriously subjective […]. And, indeed, when Fforde wrote the first version of this novel in 1994 - he called it Who Killed Humpty Dumpty? - it was rejected by every publisher he sent it to. But I love it. The Big Over Easy is great not just because it's very funny (albeit with some excruciating puns) but also because it works properly as a whodunit. Although I was wrong to say Spratt is untroubled. As a conflation of three nursery rhyme Jacks, he has several 'issues' to deal with, including the need for a fat-free diet and a strong compulsion to kill giants." Guttridge concluded his review saying simply, "Comic genius".

Reviewing the audiobook edition, read by Simon Prebble, Publishers Weekly found that, "Despite its many virtues, this is probably Fforde's weakest novel, lacking the literary sophistication of the Thursday Next books. But Prebble's performance easily makes this Fforde's best audiobook to date".

== See also ==
- BookWorld
