= Stephen Woodworth (author) =

American novelist

- Born: Fullerton, California, U.S.
- Occupation: Author
- Writing career
- Genre: Speculative fiction

Stephen Woodworth is an American speculative fiction author, and a native of Fullerton, California.

== Publications ==
- "Scary Monsters" (novella), in Writers of the Future VIII (August 1992)
- "Relaxation" (short story), in Plot #1 (Winter 1994)
- "a Woman Absent" (short story), in Dead of Night #13 (Summer 1995)
- "Keepers of the Light" (short story), in Keen Science Fiction! #2 (May 1996)
- "Purple Hearts and Other Wounds" (short story), in Fear the Fever: Hot Blood VII (July 1, 1996)
- "Serial Killers" (vignette), in Horrors! 365 Scary Stories: Get Your Daily Dose of Terror (October 1998)
- "Her" (short story), in The Magazine of Fantasy & Science Fiction #570 (Vol. 96, Issue 2; February 1999)
- "Street Runes" (short story), in After Shocks: an Anthology of So-Cal Horror (May 1, 2000)
- "Jack's Hand" (short story), in Aboriginal Science Fiction #63 (Spring 2000)
- "Transubstantiation" (short story), at Strange Horizons (November 27, 2000)
- "Because It is Bitter" (short story), in Tales of the Unanticipated #22 (April 1, 2001)
- "the Little Nightmusic That Could" (short story), in Weird Tales #328 (Summer 2002)
- "Prisoners" (short story), in Gothic.Net: Volume One (July 5, 2004)
- Through Violet Eyes (novel), by Dell Publishing (August 31, 2004)
- With Red Hands (novel), by Dell Publishing (December 28, 2004)
- In Golden Blood (novel), by Dell Publishing (October 25, 2005)
- From Black Rooms (novel), by Bantam Books (October 31, 2006)
- The Olverung (short story), in Realms of Fantasy (December 2008)

== Awards ==
- Writers of the Future Contest, for "Scary Monsters" (4th quarter, 1992); 1st place
