= Jack Sprat =

English nursery rhyme

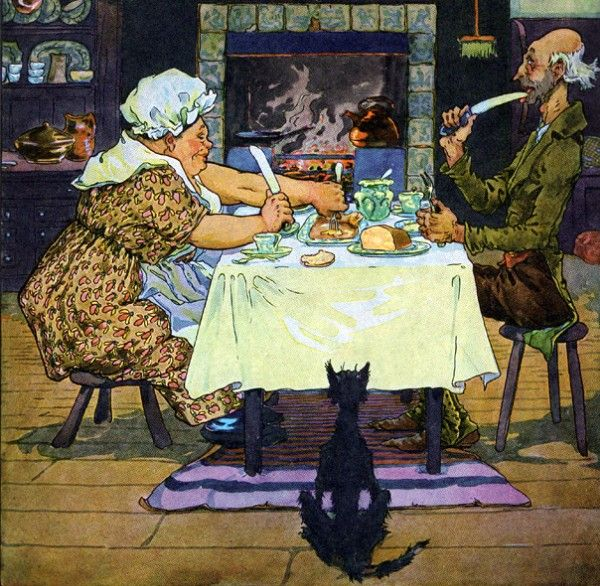
- Jack Sprat and his wife by Frederick Richardson

Nursery rhyme
- Published: 1639
- Songwriter: Appeared in John Clarke's collection of sayings

"Jack Sprat" (or "Jack Spratt") is an English language nursery rhyme. It has a Roud Folk Song Index number of 19479.

== Rhyme ==
The most common modern version of the rhyme is:

Jack Sprat could eat no fat,
His wife could eat no lean.
And so between them both, you see,
They licked the platter clean.

== Origins ==
The name "Jack Sprat" was used of people of small stature in the 16th century. This rhyme became an English proverb from at least the mid-17th century. It appeared in John Clarke's collection of sayings in 1639 in the form:

Jack will eat not fat, and Jull doth love no leane.
Yet betwixt them both they lick the dishes cleane.

Like many nursery rhymes, "Jack Sprat" may have originated as a satire on a public figure. History writer Linda Alchin suggests that Jack was King Charles I, who was left "lean" when parliament denied him taxation, but with his queen Henrietta Maria he was free to "lick the platter clean" after he dissolved parliament—Charles was a notably short man. An alternative explanation comes from the popular Robin Hood legend, applying it to the disliked King John and his greedy queen Isabella.

The saying entered the canon of English nursery rhymes when it was printed in Mother Goose's Melody around 1765, but it may have been adopted for use with children much earlier.
