= Jasper Fforde =

English novelist (born 1961)

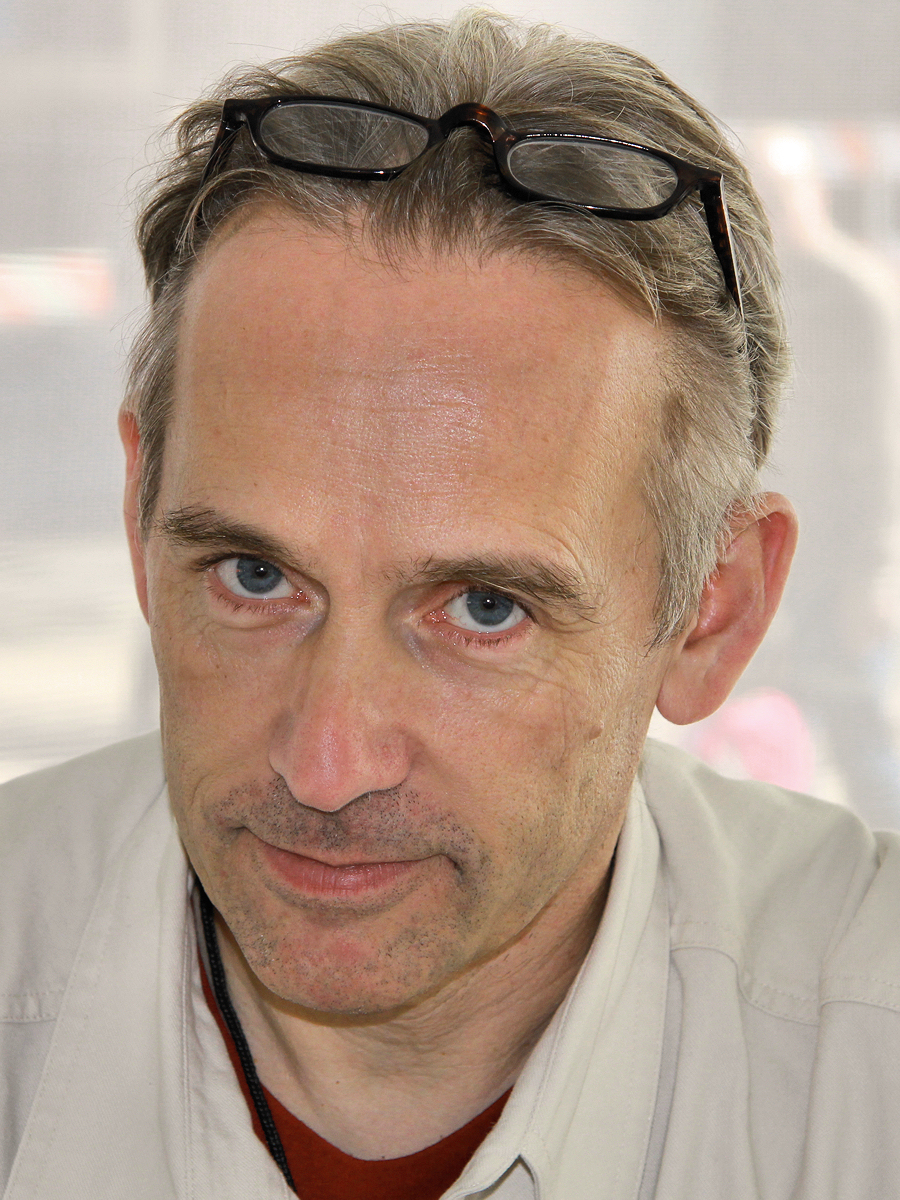
- Fforde at the 2012 Texas Book Festival
- Born: 11 January 1961 (age 65); London, England
- Occupation: Novelist
- Writing career
- Genres: Alternative history, comic fantasy
- Movement: Postmodern literature
- Website: jasperfforde.com

Jasper Fforde (born 11 January 1961) is an English novelist whose first novel, The Eyre Affair, was published in 2001. He is known mainly for his Thursday Next novels, but has also published two books in the loosely connected Nursery Crime series, two in the Shades of Grey series and four in The Last Dragonslayer series. Fforde's books abound in literary allusions and wordplay, tightly scripted plots and playfulness with the conventional, traditional genres. They usually contain elements of metafiction, parody, and fantasy.

== Early life ==
Fforde was born in London on 11 January 1961, the son of John Standish Fforde, the 24th Chief Cashier for the Bank of England. He is a grandson of the Polish political activist, Joseph Retinger, and a great-grandson of the journalist E. D. Morel.

Fforde was educated at Dartington Hall School. In his first jobs, he worked as a focus puller in the film industry. He worked on a number of films, including The Trial, Quills, GoldenEye, The Mask of Zorro, and Entrapment.

== Novels ==
Fforde's published books include a series of novels starring the literary detective Thursday Next: The Eyre Affair, Lost in a Good Book, The Well of Lost Plots, Something Rotten, First Among Sequels, One of Our Thursdays Is Missing,The Woman Who Died a Lot and Dark Reading Matter. The Eyre Affair had received 76 publisher rejections before its eventual acceptance for publication.

Fforde won the Wodehouse prize for comic fiction in 2004 for The Well of Lost Plots. Several streets in the Thames Reach housing development in Swindon have been named after characters in the series.

The Big Over Easy (2005), set in the same alternative universe as the Next novels, reworks his first written novel, which initially failed to find a publisher. Its original title was Who Killed Humpty Dumpty? It was later entitled Nursery Crime, which now refers to the series of books. These describe the investigations of DCI Jack Spratt. The follow-up to The Big Over Easy, The Fourth Bear, was published in July 2006 and focuses on Goldilocks and the Three Bears.

Shades of Grey, the first novel in a new series, was published December 2009 in the United States and January 2010 in the United Kingdom. The sequel Red Side Story was published in February 2024 in the United Kingdom and May the same year in the United States.

In November 2010 Fforde produced The Last Dragonslayer, the first novel in a new series. It is a young-adult fantasy novel about a teenage orphan Jennifer Strange which has been adapted for television. Two more books have been published in the series, The Song of the Quarkbeast (2011) and The Eye of Zoltar (2014). The series was originally planned as a trilogy, but a fourth book in the series was announced in 2014, The Great Troll War (2021).

== Short stories ==
In 2009, Fforde published a story in the Welsh edition of Big Issue magazine called "We are all alike" (previously "The Man with no Face").

He also published "The Locked Room Mystery mystery" [sic] in The Guardian newspaper in 2007; this story remains available online. The U.S. version of Well of Lost Plots features a bonus chapter (34b) called "Heavy Weather", a complete story in itself, featuring Thursday Next in her position as Bellman.

== Fforde Ffiesta ==
Originating with the Fforde Ffestival in September 2005, the Fforde Ffiesta (cf. Ford Fiesta) is a bi-annual event built around Fforde's books and held in Thursday Next's home town of Swindon over the May bank holiday weekend. People travel from afar to take part in a wide range of events, including a reenactment of the gameshow Name That Fruit, Hamlet Speed Reading competitions, and interactive performances of Richard III.

== Selected works ==
- Thursday Next
  - The Eyre Affair (2001)
  - Lost in a Good Book (2002)
  - The Well of Lost Plots (2003)
  - Something Rotten (2004)
  - First Among Sequels (2007)
  - One of Our Thursdays is Missing (2011)
  - The Woman Who Died a Lot (2012)
  - Dark Reading Matter (2026)
- Nursery Crime Division
  - The Big Over Easy (2005)
  - The Fourth Bear (2006)
- Shades of Grey
  - Shades of Grey (2009)
  - Red Side Story (2024)
- The Dragonslayer
  - The Last Dragonslayer (2010)
  - The Song of the Quarkbeast (2011)
  - The Eye of Zoltar (2014)
  - The Great Troll War (2021)
- Standalone Novels
  - Early Riser (2018)
  - The Constant Rabbit (2020)
