= The Eyre Affair =

2001 novel by Jasper Fforde

- First edition cover
- Author: Jasper Fforde
- Language: English
- Series: Thursday Next
- Genre: Alternate history, science fiction, mystery
- Publisher: Hodder and Stoughton
- Publication date: 19 July 2001
- Publication place: United Kingdom
- Media type: Print (hardcover and paperback)
- Pages: 400
- ISBN: 0-340-82047-0
- OCLC: 59513683
- Dewey Decimal: 823/.92 22
- LC Class: PR6106.F67 E97 2001
- Followed by: Lost in a Good Book

The Eyre Affair is the debut novel by English author Jasper Fforde, published by Hodder and Stoughton in 2001. It takes place in an alternative 1985, where literary detective Thursday Next pursues a master criminal through the world of Charlotte Brontë's 1847 novel Jane Eyre. Fforde had received 76 rejections for earlier works before being accepted by a publisher. Critical reception of this novel was generally positive, remarking on its originality.

== Plot summary ==
In a parallel universe, England and Imperial Russia have fought the Crimean War for more than a century; although now a republic (with entertainer George Formby as its president), England still also has a parliamentary government, although heavily influenced by the Goliath Corporation (a powerful weapon-producing company with questionable morals); and Wales is a separate, socialist nation. The book's fictional version of Jane Eyre ends with Jane accompanying her cousin, St. John Rivers, to India in order to help him with his missionary work. Society publicly debates literary questions (especially the question of Shakespearean authorship), sometimes inspiring gang wars and murder. Regular law enforcement agencies still exist, alongside new specialized agencies under the single organization SpecOps (Special Operations). The more than 20 branches include SpecOps 12, the Chronoguard, who police all events related to time travel, and SpecOps 27, the Literary Detectives, or "LiteraTecs", who deal with all literature-related crimes.

The Crimean War is a cold conflict with both sides at a stalemate but too stubborn to call for peace. A peace movement in Britain is gaining popularity. Meanwhile, Goliath has been contracted to create a plasma rifle codenamed "STONK" to overpower the Russians. The weapon should be capable of destroying a tank with a single blast. Goliath promises that STONK will soon be standard issue to the British military.

The plot revolves around Thursday Next, a single, thirty-six-year-old woman who is a veteran of the Crimean War and a literary detective who lives in London with her pet dodo Pickwick. (Dodos have been recreated, as have Neanderthals, due to advanced genetic engineering technology on this alternate Earth). She is privately against the continuation of the war, as her brother was killed in action and her then fiancé Landen Parke-Laine lost a leg in combat. The trauma of the war led to the end of her relationship with Parke-Laine several years prior.

As the story begins, Thursday is promoted to assist in the capture of a wanted terrorist, Acheron Hades, her former university professor who has become a mysterious criminal mastermind. Thursday is the only living person who can recognize him, and nearly captures him during a stakeout, but Hades possesses several superhuman abilities, such as mental manipulation and extreme durability, and uses those powers to withstand her gunfire. He evades capture and kills Thursday's entire team. During the capture attempt she is shot, but a copy of Jane Eyre stops Hades's bullet. A mysterious stranger aids her until the paramedics arrive, leaving behind a handkerchief monogrammed with the letters "E.F.R." and a 19th-century style jacket. Next recognizes these items as belonging to Edward Fairfax Rochester, a fictional character from Jane Eyre. During a flashback to her childhood, Thursday remembers a seemingly supernatural event, whereby she was able to physically enter the world of the novel and briefly became acquainted with Rochester.

While recovering in hospital, she learns that, after fleeing the scene, Hades was seemingly killed in a car accident. She also meets a time-traveling future version of herself, who warns her that Hades survived the accident, and instructs her to take a LiteraTec job in her home town of Swindon. She takes the job, and while visiting her family there, she discovers that her brilliant Uncle Mycroft and Aunt Polly have created the Prose Portal, a device that allows people to enter works of fiction. At home, she renews an acquaintance with her ex-fiancé Parke-Laine. She also meets, and is forced to work with, a high-ranking Goliath operative named Jack Schitt, who is similarly investigating Hades.

Hades, meanwhile, steals the original manuscript of Charles Dickens's Martin Chuzzlewit. He also kidnaps Mycroft, Polly, and the Prose Portal in order to blackmail the literary world; any changes made to the plot of a novel's original manuscript will change all other copies. To demonstrate his demands are serious, Hades kills Mr Quaverley, a minor character from the original manuscript of Martin Chuzzlewit. When his demands are not met, he stages a theft of the original manuscript of Jane Eyre and kidnaps Jane for another ransom demand. This causes the text of all copies of the Jane Eyre novel to abruptly end at the moment of Jane's kidnapping, roughly halfway through the book.

Next and Jack Schitt independently trace Hades to Wales. She rescues Mycroft and the Prose Portal, and returns Jane to the novel. However, she finds Aunt Polly stuck in one of Wordsworth's poems, and learns that Hades has gone into the original text of Jane Eyre carrying the scrap of paper on which Polly is imprisoned. Next pursues Hades. After several weeks in the novel (which pass in the outside world much more quickly, as the book rewrites itself after Jane is returned) and much trouble, she succeeds in killing Hades and recovering the poem with Polly in it. In the process, Thornfield Hall is burned, Rochester's mad wife Bertha falls to her death, and Rochester is grievously injured. Thursday also discovers that the characters in the book must continually relive their lives, with full knowledge of how events turn out, and are unable to alter any of them. Thus, Rochester must repeatedly suffer the devastating loss of Jane when she runs away from him upon discovering his secret marriage. Thursday, who has befriended Rochester, resolves to change the ending of the book to a happy one. She changes events to reunite Jane and Rochester (in other words, she alters the ending to match the actual ending to Jane Eyre).

Returning to her own world, Next uses the Prose Portal to release her Aunt Polly, while Jack Schitt reveals that his interest is in the device. Goliath had never been able to perfect STONK as a feasible weapon. Therefore, with their deadline to deliver the weapons to the military, he had resolved to extract working STONKs from the weapon's manual, itself a work of fiction, as the weapons don't work. Thursday reluctantly agrees to let Schitt use the portal for this endeavor, but switches the book connected to the portal to be the text of Edgar Allan Poe's "The Raven". When the portal opens, she pushes Schitt inside, and traps him there, while Mycroft destroys the portal.

Using her new celebrity status, Next enters a televised debate between supporters and opponents of the continuation of the Crimean War. Supporters of the war assume that Goliath's plasma rifles will be sufficient to guarantee victory. But in the debate, Next publicly reveals that the plasma rifles do not work. This forces England to rethink its position, which leads to peace negotiations and an end to the war.

Next shows up at the church where Parke-Laine is about to be married to another woman, but Rochester's lawyer interrupts the wedding to reveal that the bride is already married. Next and Parke-Laine are reconciled and marry instead. Next's father, a renegade agent from SpecOps-12, the ChronoGuard, turns up to dispense some fatherly advice to his daughter. The novel ends with Next facing an uncertain future at work: public reaction to the new ending for Jane Eyre is positive, but there are other repercussions, including Goliath's fury.

== Reception ==
The book was generally acclaimed, with critics calling it "playfully irreverent", "delightfully daft", "whoppingly imaginative", and "a work of ... startling originality".

The "genre-busting" novel spans numerous types of literature, with critics identifying aspects of fantasy, science fiction, mystery, satire, romance, and thriller. This led one critic to jokingly suggest that Fforde "must have jotted a bundle of unrelated ideas on slips of paper", and, "instead of tossing them in a hat and choosing a few topics as the focus of his story, [he] grabbed the whole hat." Fforde's quirky writing style has led to comparisons with other notable writers, most frequently Douglas Adams, for similar "surrealism and satire", and Lewis Carroll, for similar "nonsense and wordplay".

Reviewers have compared Fforde to other authors, including Woody Allen, Sara Paretsky, and Connie Willis. One critic wondered if Fforde was more "Monty Python crossed with Terry Pratchett, or J. K. Rowling mixed with Douglas Adams." The novel was praised for its fast-paced action, wordplay, and "off-centre humour".

Mary Hamilton of The Guardian described the experience as

"the page opens like a trapdoor and you simply fall through. The Eyre Affair takes that feeling, the moment you lose the sense of yourself and become engrossed in the story, and creates high adventure and wild drama around the porous boundaries between fiction and real life."

Some reviewers criticised the novel for "convoluted" plots and "dangling details", as well as inconsistent dialogue that "can veer from wittily wicked to non-sequitur", and minor characters who "drift in and out of scenes".
