= Steven Erikson bibliography =

List of complete works by Canadian fantasy fiction author Steven Erikson.

== Malazan Book of the Fallen ==
Erikson and Ian C. Esslemont initially devised the Malazan world as a backdrop for a table-top role-playing game. Unhappy with the lack of quality adult oriented fantasy movies at the time, the duo decided to write their own movie script using their gaming experience and the world they had created. The script, titled Gardens of the Moon, was deemed too risky and failed to sell. With interest in the script seeming nonexistent, Erikson, with Esslemont's go ahead, reworked it into a fantasy novel, which he completed around 1991–92.

After meeting almost a decade of rejection, the novel was finally sold to Transworld, a division of Random House. The publisher was pleased with the work and requested additional books in the series. Using the history of the Malazan world, nine additional novels were plotted. After the publication of Gardens of the Moon, reviews spread via the internet, and Orion publications attempted to lure the writer away from Transworld. However, Transworld retained an option on additional novels in the series and offered £675,000 for the remaining nine books of the series.

While there are many plotlines woven through the whole series, the main storyline focuses on a period in time where the Malazan Empire is facing resistance to their conquest of the world. The series was completed with the publication of The Crippled God, the tenth novel in the series, in 2011.

Erikson's background as an archeologist and anthropologist also shaped how he crafted the story. His approach was to use as many perspectives and points of view as possible in terms of interpreting history. He also drew inspiration from Homer's Illiad, where gods constantly meddled into mortal affairs, adding the twist that it doesn't always work out as planned for the god.

As of 2018, 3 million copies have been sold.

=== The Kharkanas Trilogy ===
After the publication of the seventh novel in the Malazan Book of the Fallen series, Reaper's Gale, the publisher agreed to two trilogies and novellas set in the Malazan world. This consequently led to a prequel trilogy, titled the Kharkanas Trilogy, set almost three hundred thousand years before the events of the main series, elements of which he began introducing in Toll the Hounds and in The Crippled God.

The series deals with numerous founding or elder races from the Malazan World, with the narrative anchored around the circumstances that would ultimately lead to the split of the Tiste race. It sheds light and demystifies the events that are often hinted at in the background of Malazan Book of the Fallen. Primarily focusing on characters such as Anomander Rake, Draconus, Gothos, K’rul and Hood, mainly through the eyes of secondary characters.

As of 2022, two novels have been published, Forge of Darkness (2012) and Fall of Light (2016), with the third taking a backseat to the first novel in The Tales of Witness series. In a post on his official Facebook account, the author explained that the dismal sale figures for the previous novels and the creative toll employing the writing style used throughout the previous books was what had led to his decision to take a break from it in order to do it justice.

=== The Tales of Witness ===
This planned four-book series centers around the popular character, Karsa Orlong. These books will be a sequel to the main series, set, according to the author, a decade after the main narrative.

The first novel is titled The God Is Not Willing, which was released in November 2021. The second book, No Life Forsaken, was released in October 2025. The third book, Legacies of Betrayal, was released in October 2026.

=== The Tales of Bauchelain and Korbal Broach ===
Erikson wrote side stories centering on two necromancers and their manservant, characters he introduced in Memories of Ice, the third novel in the Malazan Book of the Fallen series. These side stories take place in the Malazan world, but have no connection to the series' overall plot.

As of 2022, seven novellas have been published, the first in 2002, titled Blood Follows, and the latest in 2021, titled Upon a Dark of Evil Overlords. In 2009, the first three novellas were collected and published together as The Tales of Bauchelain and Korbal Broach. And in 2018, books four to six were collected and published together as The Second Collected Tales of Bauchelain & Korbal Broach.

Per his agreement with his publisher, the author is expected to write two more novellas featuring these characters.

== Willful Child Trilogy ==
Erikson is a huge fan of the Star Trek series, especially the first iteration which he credits as being his gateway to science fiction in general. But he finds himself feeling disenfranchised by some of the later iterations, especially from The Next Generation onward. In an interview he goes into detail regarding this issue, concluding that among other things creative compromises were to blame for the dip in quality. But while criticizing the series' current state, he affirms that he nonetheless still is a fan. Willful Child, published in September, 2014, is the writer's "response" to the overused tropes and caricature of Captain Kirkesque characters in science fiction, with the main character, Captain Hadrian Sawback, being the most recognizable reflection. While the novel is a spoof of science fiction in general, it is rife with oftentimes poignant social commentary.

The Wrath of Betty, the follow-up, was published in 2016.

== Rejoice, A Knife to the Heart ==
Instead ... I wanted an ET arriving that then set about doing what it does, while utterly and completely ignoring the usual list of suspects (presidents, men-in-black, scientists, the military); and to then not only ignore them, but bring them down. An end to secrecy. An end to hidden power-blocks and all the vicious games they play to stay in power. Wake up, world, to a brand-new day.

Erikson had aspirations of writing a First Contact science fiction novel which played with the typical conventions of alien encounters. In 2017, UK based publisher Gollancz acquired the rights to this book, titled Rejoice, A Knife to the Heart. The novel was released on October 16, 2018, and was received with critical acclaim, with science fiction author Robert Sawyer praising its concept and its execution.

== Bibliography ==
Title	Year	Type	Series
A Ruin of Feathers	1991	Novella	Standalone written as Steve Lundin
Stolen Voices	1993	Novella	Standalone written as Steve Lundin
Revolvo & Other Canadian Tales	1998	Novella	Standalone written as Steve Lundin
This River Awakens	1998	Novel	Standalone written as Steve Lundin
Gardens of the Moon	1999	Novel	Malazan Book of the Fallen
Deadhouse Gates	2000	Novel	Malazan Book of the Fallen
Memories of Ice	2001	Novel	Malazan Book of the Fallen
Blood Follows	2002	Novella	The Tales of Bauchelain and Korbal Broach
House of Chains	2002	Novel	Malazan Book of the Fallen
Midnight Tides	2004	Novel	Malazan Book of the Fallen
The Healthy Dead	2004	Novella	The Tales of Bauchelain and Korbal Broach
The Devil Delivered	2004	Novella	Standalone
Fishin' with Grandma Matchie	2004	Novella	Standalone
When She's Gone	2004	Novella	Standalone
The Bonehunters	2006	Novel	Malazan Book of the Fallen
Reaper's Gale	2007	Novel	Malazan Book of the Fallen
The Lees of Laughter's End	2007	Novella	The Tales of Bauchelain and Korbal Broach
This Rich Evil Sound	2007	Short story	Standalone
Revolvo	2008	Novella	Standalone
Toll the Hounds	2008	Novel	Malazan Book of the Fallen
Crack’d Pot Trail	2009	Novella	The Tales of Bauchelain and Korbal Broach
Dust of Dreams	2009	Novel	Malazan Book of the Fallen
Goats of Glory	2010	Short story	Set in Malazan universe
The Crippled God	2011	Novel	Malazan Book of the Fallen
The Wurms of Blearmouth	2012	Novella	The Tales of Bauchelain and Korbal Broach
The Devil Delivered and Other Tales	2012	Novella	Standalone
Forge of Darkness	2012	Novel	The Kharkanas Trilogy
Willful Child	2014	Novel	Willful Child Trilogy
Willful Child: Wrath of Betty	2016	Novel	Willful Child Trilogy
Fall of Light	2016	Novel	The Kharkanas Trilogy
The Fiends of Nightmaria	2016	Novella	The Tales of Bauchelain and Korbal Broach
Rejoice, A Knife to the Heart	2018	Novel	Standalone
Willful Child: The Search for Spark	2018	Novel	Willful Child Trilogy
The God is Not Willing	2021	Novel	The Tales of Witness
Upon a Dark of Evil Overlords	2021	Novella	The Tales of Bauchelain & Korbal Broach
The Last Vandals on Earth	2024	Short story	Standalone
No Life Forsaken	2025	Novel	The Tales of Witness
Legacies of Betrayal	2026	Novel	The Tales of Witness
Walk in Shadow	TBA	Novel	The Kharkanas Trilogy
The Last God	TBA	Novel	The Tales of Witness
