= Assail (novel) =

2014 novel by Ian Cameron Esslemont

- Author: Ian Cameron Esslemont
- Cover artist: Steve Stone
- Language: English
- Series: Novels of the Malazan Empire
- Genre: High fantasy
- Publisher: Bantam Books (UK & Canada) & Tor Books (USA)
- Publication date: 3 July 2014 (UK & Canada), 5 August 2014 (USA)
- Publication place: United Kingdom
- Media type: Print (Hardback)
- Pages: 544 pp (Bantam UK hardcover edition)
- ISBN: 0-593-06448-8 (Bantam UK hardcover edition)
- Preceded by: Blood and Bone

Assail is the sixth and final volume of the Novels of the Malazan Empire series by Canadian author Ian Cameron Esslemont. The novel is set in the world of the Malazan Book of the Fallen, co-created with Esslemont's friend and colleague Steven Erikson.

== Development ==
In a 2006 interview with sffworld.com, Esslemont already lays the groundwork for Assail. In the interview he discusses how he plans for the series to be five novels in total, where the final volume would cover "the mysteries of the Assail continent". In a 2009 interview with Clarkesworld Magazine, Esslemont states he has a contract "for four more Malazan novels" and he will "finish up by revealing Assail".

== Plot ==
As the final volume of the Novels of the Malazan Empire, Assail also takes place after The Malazan Book of the Fallen and serves as an epilogue to both series. The novel takes place on the continent of the same name and continues plot threads that began in Return of the Crimson Guard.

== Critical reception ==
Assail received mostly positive reviews.

Bill Capossere praised its "pace and smooth shifts in POV" and "several vividly exciting set scenes". However, he noted the "repetitive nature of some of the plot" and the "characterization has its ups and downs". Overall, he concluded "the novel’s positives easily outweighed its negatives".

Fantasy Book Review gave it a 9 out of 10, calling it "one of my favourite books of the year".

The Wertzone described it as a "mostly well-written, enjoyable novel" but criticized the lack of resolution by its conclusion.

=== Other reviews ===
- Review by A. P. Canavan (2014) in The New York Review of Science Fiction, October 2014
