= Guildford Arts Book Prize =

The Guildford Arts Book Prize has been awarded annually for the best first novel by an author living anywhere in the UK, and announced at the Guildford Book Festival. Between 1998 and 2005 it was sponsored by Pendleton May and known as the Pendleton May First Novel Award, in 2006 by Goss & Co., and in 2007 by Jelf Group PLC, which had supported the award since its inception.

The winners have been :

- 1997 : Jeremy Poolman for Interesting Facts about the State of Arizona
- 1998 : Steve Lundin for This River Awakens
- Pendleton May First Novel Award :
  - 1999 : ?
  - 2000 : ?
  - 2001 : Shamim Sarif for The World Unseen
  - 2002 : Hari Kunzru for The Impressionist
  - 2003 : Babs Horton for A Jarful Of Angels
  - 2004 : Panos Karnezis for The Maze
  - 2005 : Clare Clark for The Great Stink
- Goss First Novel Award :
  - 2006 : Mike Stocks for White Man Falling
- Jelf Group First Novel Award :
  - Catherine O'Flynn for What Was Lost
- First Novel Award
  - 2008 Ross Raisin for God's Own Country
  - 2009 award in abeyance
