= Toll the Hounds =

Eighth book of the Malazan Book of the Fallen series

- Tor 2nd cover
- Author: Steven Erikson
- Language: English
- Series: Malazan Book of the Fallen
- Genre: High fantasy
- Publisher: Bantam (UK & Canada); Tor Books (US)
- Publication date: 30 June 2008 (UK & Canada); 16 September 2008 (US)
- Publication place: United Kingdom
- Media type: Print (hardback & paperback), audiobook, e-book
- Pages: 1,296 (Bantam paperback)
- ISBN: 0-593-04638-2 (Bantam paperback)
- Preceded by: Reaper's Gale
- Followed by: Dust of Dreams

Toll the Hounds is the eighth novel in Canadian author Steven Erikson's epic fantasy series, the Malazan Book of the Fallen. It was first published on June 30, 2008, in the UK and Canada, and on September 16, 2008, in the US.

Toll the Hounds centers around the legacy of Anomander Rake, Son of Darkness and Lord of the Tiste Andii, and the convergence of various powers in the city of Darujhistan.

== Development ==
In an interview, Erikson stated that he found it a bit difficult to write the novel because of personal issues. The issue, from subsequent Q&A's and interviews, was revealed to be the death of his father.

When asked about the unique and divisive tone and style of the novel, Erikson said he had planned to write the novel with Kruppe's voice "from very early on in the series".

== Plot ==
Many of the characters from Gardens of the Moon and Memories of Ice make a return in this novel.

=== Prologue ===
The prologue is divided into four separate scenes.

The first is in a "necropolis of sorts", where two people, who are revealed to be dead, witness a meeting between Hood, Edgewalker, Shadowthrone, and Anomander Rake, though they are not privy to what is discussed.

The second is set in the realm of Dragnipur, where it is suggested that the Wagon is becoming very difficult to pull, as more souls keep dying. While on the horizon, Chaos steadily advances on the Gate of Kurald Galain.

The third scene plays out in a village, where two girls notice the departure of a dog and decide to follow.

The last scene is by a fire on an empty plain (likely in Kruppe's dream world), where Kruppe asks K'rul to witness him dance.

=== Genabackis ===
==== Darujhistan ====
The retired Bridgeburners are enjoying their retirement when assassins from the Assassins' Guild suddenly come after them, though the assassins soon discover that the Bridgeburners aren't easy marks.

Spite and her companions arrive in Darujhistan and go their separate ways. Crokus, under the alias Cutter, is anxious at the thought of being reunited with his old friends at the Phoenix Inn, while Barathol seeks anonymity in the city.

Mappo Runt is anxious to find Icarium, who is on the Letheri continent. He hires the Trygalle Trade Guild to take him to that distant continent and is accompanied by Gruntle, who does this because he is irritated by all the attention from the acolytes and priestesses of Trake, the new God of War.

==== Black Coral ====
Itkovian's sacrifice (in Memories of Ice) gave birth to a new cult (the cult of the Redeemer), propelling him to godhood. But another god is out there to bend and corrupt the cult. Only a former Seerdomin appears to stand in that god's path.

Anomander Rake, the Son of Darkness, asks Endest Silann, the broken High Mage of Moon's Spawn, and Spinnock Durav, the wandering Tiste Andii warrior, to do what must be done, as he senses many things coming.

==== Plain of Lamatath ====
As Karsa Orlong and Samar Dev traverse the Plain of Lamatath, they encounter Traveller. Someone, Karsa realizes, not even he can cross.

==== Nimander & Companions and Kallor ====
Clip leads Nimander Golit and the others toward Black Coral, where his confrontation with the Son of Darkness awaits. They encounter Kallor, and he joins them on their journey.

=== The Realm of Dragnipur ===
Within the realm of Dragnipur, more and more souls are dying, and the ones left standing are more than aware that Chaos is on the verge of overtaking the wagon. When that occurs, Draconus, the elder god who forged Dragnipur, is aware that all the realms could be destroyed. He has a desperate plan to face what seems inevitable, but little does he know that a blind Tiste Andii has an agenda of his own.

== Publication history ==
The novel was first released by Bantam in the UK and Canada in a trade paperback edition on June 30, 2008, followed by a US release by Tor Books in September of the same year. A mass-market paperback edition was released on August 4, 2009.

An unabridged audiobook was released by Brilliance Audio on March 15, 2015. The audiobook was narrated by Michael Page, and is 44 hours and 9 minutes long.

== Critical reception ==
The novel received mixed-to-positive reviews on its initial release.

Fantasy Book Reviews gave the novel a 10 on a scale of 10.

On the blog Neth Space, blogger Neth wrote in a very positive review that Toll the Hounds "may be the best written volume so far in Steven Erikson's momentous epic fantasy series: The Malazan Book of the Fallen".

Pat's Fantasy Hotlist gave it a 9 out of 10, writing, "After nearly 800 pages spent setting the stage, Steven Erikson finally goes in 'attack mode.' And when he does, prepare yourself to be blown away!"

SFF World also gave the book a positive review, writing, "...until reading the last 300 pages, [this review was] going to be about whether the early negative elements had made this one of the weaker books in the series. Then four hours disappeared in a heartbeat, and the words now fail to adequately convey how absolutely draining reading the last third of the book is".

The Wertzone also gave a positive review, writing, "Toll the Hounds is also the Malazan series' most thematically-developed and tightest novel, with notions of family, responsibility and the role of desire all coming in for examination."

Daniel Lin on Daniel's Corner Unlimited gave it a mixed review, writing, "Toll the Hounds is my least favourite book in this series, but it is not a bad book. In fact, this book is extremely well written, and it has more depth than previous books".
