= Orb Sceptre Throne =

2012 novel by Ian Cameron Esslemont

- Author: Ian Cameron Esslemont
- Cover artist: Steve Stone
- Language: English
- Series: Novels of the Malazan Empire
- Genre: High fantasy
- Publisher: Bantam Press (UK & Canada) & Tor Books (USA)
- Publication date: 19 January 2012
- Publication place: United Kingdom
- Media type: Print (Hardback)
- Pages: 608 (Bantam UK hardcover edition)
- ISBN: 0-593-06450-X (Bantam UK hardcover edition)
- OCLC: 760974846
- Preceded by: Stonewielder
- Followed by: Blood and Bone

Orb Sceptre Throne is a high fantasy novel by Canadian author Ian Cameron Esslemont, the fourth he wrote set in the world of the Malazan Book of the Fallen, co-created with Esslemont's friend and colleague Steven Erikson. Orb Sceptre Throne is the fourth of six novels by Esslemont to take place in the Malazan world.

== Plot ==
The novel takes place mainly in the city of Darujhistan during the events of Stonewielder and The Crippled God. There are several plotlines, one involving a tyrannical ruler in Darujhistan, one dealing with Antsy's journey to the remains of Moon's Spawn, a floating fortress, and a third plotline involving the warrior people of Seguleh.

== Reception ==
Publishers Weekly summarized: "Subplots too dense to summarize will make sense only to longtime fans, but those familiar with the series will find this a worthy and satisfying installment." Bill Capossere from Reactor wrote: "[...] Orb, Sceptre, Throne is Esslemont’s finest novel to date and a thoroughly enjoyable read." In a re-read of the novel, Capossere still liked it, writing: "Besides being perhaps the best crafted of the novels so far, or at least the second best, OST, is also for me his [Esslemont's] “warmest” novel." Another reviewer, Amanda Rutter, enjoyed the novel overall but had some consistency and depth issues.
