= The Lees of Laughter's End =

2007 novella by Steven Erikson

The Lees Of Laughter's End
- First edition PS Publishing
- Author: Steven Erikson
- Language: English
- Series: The Tales of Bauchelain and Korbal Broach
- Genre: Fantasy novel
- Publisher: PS Publishing
- Publication date: March 2007
- Publication place: United Kingdom, United States
- Media type: Print (Hardback)
- Pages: 151 pp
- ISBN: 978-1-905834-46-4 (PS Publishing)
- OCLC: 173225895
- Preceded by: The Healthy Dead
- Followed by: Crack'd Pot Trail

The Lees Of Laughter's End is a novella by Canadian author Steven Erikson, set in the world of his Malazan Book of the Fallen epic fantasy series. It continues the storyline of Bauchelain, Korbal Broach and Emancipor Reese, three characters who had a cameo appearance in the novel Memories of Ice and were the focus for the previous two novellas, Blood Follows and The Healthy Dead. Although this novella was written after The Healthy Dead, its place in the storyline is immediately following Blood Follows and prior to The Healthy Dead.

The novella was published in the United Kingdom by PS Publishing in March 2007.
