= Midnight Tides =

Book by Steven Erikson

- First edition cover
- Author: Steven Erikson
- Cover artist: Steve Stone
- Language: English
- Series: Malazan Book of the Fallen
- Genre: Fantasy
- Published: 2004 by Bantam (UK & Canada) & Tor Books (USA)
- Publication date: 1 March 2004
- Publication place: United Kingdom
- Media type: Print (Hardback & Paperback)
- Pages: 959
- ISBN: 0-553-81314-5 (UK paperback edition)
- OCLC: 57199905
- Dewey Decimal: 823.92
- LC Class: PR9199.4.E745
- Preceded by: House of Chains
- Followed by: The Bonehunters

Midnight Tides is a fantasy novel by Canadian author Steven Erikson, the fifth volume in his epic fantasy series, the Malazan Book of the Fallen. Although it is part of the larger series, it contains limited references to the earlier books. However, it is not a stand-alone volume, as the events of Reaper's Gale and Dust of Dreams follow directly from it.

The novel was first published in the United Kingdom as a hardcover on 1 March 2004, followed by a mass-market paperback edition on 1 March 2005. The first American edition was released on 17 April 2007.

== Plot summary ==
In the wake of a great battle between the K'Chain Che'Malle and an alliance of Tiste Andii and Tiste Edur; the former led by Silchas Ruin, brother to Anomander rake, and the latter led by Scabandari, who is then named Bloodeye by Silchas. Whilst, both of the Tiste factions bore egregious losses in the battle, the Tiste Andii had the harder task, and thus vastly fewer of them survived, and Scabandari then betrays Silchas, stabbing him in the back and having the surviving Tiste Andii killed, lest they pose a threat in the millennia to come. Millennia later, the Tiste Edur tribes, united by the Warlock King, are set to meet with a delegation from the Kingdom of Lether to negotiate a treaty. Meanwhile, the city of Lether is preparing for the fulfilment of a prophecy that declares the King will become Emperor at the Seventh Closure.

To increase his power, and enable him to challenge the Letherii, the Warlock King sends Trull Sengar and his brothers—Fear, Binadas, and Rhulad—on a quest to recover a sword. When they locate the sword, they are attacked by a tribe of Soletaken wolves, called the Jheck. During the skirmish, Rhulad takes up the sword and is killed while wielding it. The Sengar brothers then flee the northern wastes, harried by the Jheck throughout much of their journey. They return with Rhulad's corpse, but the body refuses to relinquish the sword, sparking a feud between the Warlock King and the Sengar family.

As Rhulad's body is prepared for its funeral, he is resurrected through the machinations of the Crippled God, and hence becomes his servant. Rhulad then deposes the Warlock King, seizes control over the Edur, expels the Letherii delegation, and begins preparing for war. Meanwhile, Hull Beddict, who used to serve the Letherii, but was betrayed by them, remains behind and swears allegiance to Rhulad, advising him in his new war.

Tehol Beddict evacuates non-citizens from Lether, outmanoeuvres Gerun Eberict, and consistently outwits his partners. Meanwhile, his brother Brys Beddict strives to maintain order in the city and forms an alliance with an ancient god.

King Diskanar crowns himself Emperor, but Letherii forces under the Queen and Prince are routed and destroyed in battle. The Azath House is dying and entrusts an undead child named Kettle with feeding it blood to sustain its life. Kettle is approached by Bugg, whose knowledge far exceeds what one might expect from a mere manservant. He offers her guidance. Later, several beings escape from the Azath House, only to be dealt with by the enigmatic Bugg.

Simultaneously, the Edur enter the city and seize the palace, despite resistance from the Ceda and Brys Beddict. Trull Sengar kills the Ceda, and Brys challenges Rhulad. Brys incapacitates Rhulad without killing him, but the other Edur cannot bring themselves to end their emperor's life, leaving him lying on the ground, screaming in agony.

The newly crowned Emperor Diskanar, anticipating defeat, commits suicide by drinking poisoned wine. After maiming Rhulad, Brys is forced to drink from a poisoned chalice and dies as a result. His body is claimed by his forgotten god.

Within the Azath House, amidst a fierce battle, Udinaas arrives and frees Silchas Ruin. Ruin assists in destroying the other creatures. Despite having the chance to escape, Trull chooses to return to Rhulad, determined to help him regain his sanity.

Meanwhile, Tehol is attacked and nearly killed. His brother Hull is murdered for betraying the Letherii, leaving only the seemingly lowly Bugg to protect him. However, Bugg reveals himself as Mael, the Elder God of the Seas, and saves Tehol. As the book concludes, Bugg/Mael departs to confront the Crippled God.

== Critical reception ==
Reviewers have praised Erikson's world-building and character development, describing the series as the most significant work of epic fantasy since Stephen R. Donaldson's The Chronicles of Thomas Covenant. Erikson revisits several themes explored in his earlier novels.

Publishers Weekly remarked, ".. readers with a taste for massive high fantasy epics will welcome Erikson's fifth entry in his Malazan Book of the Fallen saga, though it largely deals with the calm between storms."
