= Return of the Crimson Guard =

2008 novel by Ian Cameron Esslemont

- Paperback edition cover
- Author: Ian Cameron Esslemont
- Cover artist: Steve Stone
- Language: English
- Series: Novels of the Malazan Empire
- Genre: Fantasy
- Published: 2008 by PS Publishing (UK) & Bantam (UK & Canada)
- Publication place: United Kingdom
- Media type: Print (Hardback and Paperback)
- Pages: 743 (PS Publishing edition)
- ISBN: 0-593-05809-7
- OCLC: 228196485
- Dewey Decimal: 813.6
- LC Class: PS3605.S684
- Preceded by: Night of Knives
- Followed by: Stonewielder

Return of the Crimson Guard is a fantasy novel by Canadian author Ian Cameron Esslemont, his second book set in the world of the Malazan Book of the Fallen, co-created with friend and colleague Steven Erikson. Chronologically, Return of the Crimson Guard takes place after the events in Erikson's sixth Malazan novel, The Bonehunters. Return of the Crimson Guard is the second of six planned novels by Esslemont to take place in the Malazan world, starting with Night of Knives and followed by Stonewielder.

Many characters and locations which appear in Return of the Crimson Guard also appear in Erikson's novels as well as Esslemont's Night of Knives.

== Plot overview ==
The novel is set shortly after the events of The Bonehunters. The Malazan Empire is in turmoil following the catastrophic war in Seven Cities and the plague which has devastated the subcontinent and severely disrupted food supplies to Quon Tali, the Empire's home continent. In an attempt to divert the populace's anger elsewhere, the Empress Laseen has pinned the blame for the disaster on the Wickan contingents of the armies in Seven Cities, and a pogrom has been launched into the Wickan homelands. However, this bluff has not succeeded and civil war threatens to tear the Empire apart. Whilst the Malazan Empire teeters on the brink of disaster, the mercenary group known as the Crimson Guard has been summoned back to Quon Tali to take advantage of the chaos and fulfil their century-old vow to liberate their homeland from the occupiers.

== Publication history ==
Return of the Crimson Guard was first published in the United Kingdom by PS Publishing in May 2008 as a limited, two-volume hardcover. Bantam UK published Return of the Crimson Guard in hardcover on 15 August 2008. A two volume limited edition of the novel was also available from PS Publishing. The book was released in North America by Bantam on 16 September 2008.

== Critical reception ==
Publishers Weekly described the novel as "a long, bloody, explosive-filled battle to end all battles" while noting that Esslemont handily outdoes even series co-creator Erikson in evoking the gore and grit of the battlefield. The novel received mostly positive reviews with reviewers praising its relentless, driving pace, world-building and characterization, while noting that its size and complexity for its main drawbacks. Reactor re-read the novel and one of the reviewers disliked the novel and said: "my overwhelming response was “is that it?”", the other reviewer was more positive and said that "the book held up well on a second read".

=== Other reviews ===
- Review [Dutch] by Tessel M. Bauduin (2010) in Holland-SF 2010, #1
