= Crack'd Pot Trail =

2009 novella by Steven Erikson

- Author: Steven Erikson
- Cover artist: Dirk Berger
- Language: English
- Series: The Tales of Bauchelain and Korbal Broach
- Genre: Fantasy
- Publisher: PS Publishing (UK) & Tor Books (US)
- Publication date: December 2009
- Publication place: United Kingdom, United States
- Media type: Print (hardback)
- Pages: 204 pp
- ISBN: 978-1-84863-057-4
- OCLC: 704383847
- Preceded by: The Healthy Dead
- Followed by: The Wurms of Blearmouth

Crack'd Pot Trail is the fourth novella by Canadian author Steven Erikson in his Malazan Book of the Fallen series. It is preceded by The Lees of Laughter's End, and will be followed by another two novellas. The novella was released in December 2009 with 300 traycased, signed and jacketed hardcovers with color plates and 700 unjacketed and unsigned hardcovers copies available for pre-order.
