= House of Chains =

2002 novel by Steven Erikson

- Author: Steven Erikson
- Cover artist: Steve Stone
- Language: English
- Series: Malazan Book of the Fallen
- Genre: Fantasy novel
- Publisher: Bantam (UK & Canada) & Tor Books (USA)
- Publication date: 2 December 2002
- Publication place: United Kingdom
- Media type: Print (Hardback & Paperback)
- Pages: 1,021 (UK paperback edition)
- ISBN: 0-553-81313-7 (UK paperback edition)
- OCLC: 52456342
- Preceded by: Memories of Ice
- Followed by: Midnight Tides

House of Chains is an epic fantasy novel by Canadian author Steven Erikson, the fourth volume of his series the Malazan Book of the Fallen. It is a sequel to the second volume, Deadhouse Gates.

== Synopsis ==
The first volume of House of Chains takes place prior to the events of the previous three books. A mighty Teblor warrior named Karsa Orlong descends from his mountain fastness on Genabackis, beginning a campaign against civilisation that leads to the deaths of his brothers and his capture by the Malazan Empire. Karsa is brought to the subcontinent of Seven Cities via a slave ship, where he befriends local rebel Leoman of the Flails. The two escape the Malazans and travel to the holy desert of Raraku to join Sha'ik, where Karsa is revealed to be the Toblakai who previously appeared in Deadhouse Gates.

The story moves forward to immediately after the events of Deadhouse Gates. The Chain of Dogs - the evacuation of 50,000 Malazan civilians across 1,500 miles of hostile territory - ended in the tragic loss of the entire 7th army and its heroic commander, Coltaine. However, their sacrifice has bought the lives of nearly 30,000 refugees. The Chain of Dogs has become a legend spreading across Seven Cities, cowing even those responsible for its destruction. Now, Adjunct Tavore Paran arrives in Seven Cities at the head of the 14th Army, largely consisting of untried recruits. Their mission is to advance into the Holy Desert Raraku, the heart of the rebellion known as the Whirlwind, and destroy Sha'ik and her forces.

Apsalar and Crokus, now known as Cutter, had finally achieved their mission, and returned to Apsalar's old home. There, Rellock passes away, and Cutter; accompanied grudgingly by Apsalar, is recruited by Cotillion to travel to the isle of Drift Avalii in order to guard the true throne of shadow from the Tiste Edur. There, they end up fighting alongside Andarist, brother of Anomander Rake, several other Tiste Andii, and later a Malazan contingent, including a mysterious figure known as Traveller. They succeed in this endeavour, and then leave the island, eventually staying with Iskaral Pust, a high priest of shadow, and his wife; yet there, after a discussion with Cotillion, Apsalar vanishes, agreeing to serve Cotillion, so Cutter does not.

However, the newly instated Sha'ik is in fact Tavore's sister Felisin - a fact known only by her companion Heboric Light Touch, known amongst the army of the apocalypse as Ghost Hands. Though the rebels vastly outnumber the Malazans, Sha'ik's camp faces internal conflicts that threaten to destroy her army before the Malazans can. Karsa refuses invitations from the Crippled God to become his Knight of Chains. Kalam, Cutter, and Apsalar struggle for control of the Throne of Shadow. A Tiste Edur warrior named Trull Sengar is saved by and thereafter embarks upon a journey across several realms with a T'lan Imass named Onrack.

The Malazan army reaches Raraku, and witnesses the disintegration of the rebel forces amidst several betrayals, leading to the death of Dryjhna. Felisin is thus liberated from the control of the Whirlwind Goddess, but goes unrecognised by her sister who then tragically kills her without a word spoken. The Malazan forces are assisted by an army of ghosts, including those of the deceased Bridgeburners, who have achieved a state of ascendancy. The Raraku desert is flooded. Leoman withdraws with the remnants of the rebel forces. Karsa departs on his own journey.

In an epilogue, Trull and Onrack arrive at the First Throne - where Trull begins a story that is told in full in Midnight Tides.

== Publishing ==
The novel was the first in the series to be published in hardback, appearing in the United Kingdom on 2 December 2002. A mass-market paperback followed on 3 October 2003. The first United States edition was a hardcover published on 22 August 2006.

== Reviews ==
In its review of House of Chains, Publishers Weekly observed, "Unusual among fantasy writers, Erikson succeeds in making readers empathize equally with all sides involved in his world's vast, century-spanning conflict." Calling the story "multilayered", a review in Library Journal stated, "Complexly drawn characters occupy a richly detailed world in this panoramic saga, which should appeal to fans of epic and military fantasy as well as series followers."

== Sources ==
- Walsh, Neil (2003). "House of Chains: A Tale of the Malazan Book of the Fallen". Sf Site.com. Archived from the original on February 18, 2003.
- Review by William Thompson (2003) in Interzone, #187 March 2003
- Review by uncredited (2003) in Vector 232
