= Kellanved's Reach =

2019 novel by Ian Cameron Esslemont

- Author: Ian Cameron Esslemont
- Cover artist: Steve Stone
- Language: English
- Series: Path to Ascendancy
- Genre: High fantasy
- Publisher: Tor Books (USA) & Bantam Books (UK & Canada)
- Publication date: 2 April 2019 (US), 23 January 2020 (UK)
- Publication place: United Kingdom
- Media type: Print (Hardback)
- Pages: 352 pp (Tor US hardcover edition)
- ISBN: 9780765379498 (Tor US hardcover edition)
- Preceded by: Deadhouse Landing
- Followed by: Forge of the High Mage (forthcoming)

Kellanved's Reach is the third novel of the Path to Ascendancy series by Canadian author Ian Cameron Esslemont. Set in the world of the Malazan Book of the Fallen, Kellanved's Reach tells the story of the founding of the Malazan empire.

== Development ==
In a 2016 interview with The Critical Dragon, Esslemont states he has three novels planned for his Path to Ascendency series. He goes on to state "the door is open" for further novels, and the series could "prove as long as it need be to tell its tale".

In a March 2022 interview, Esslemont announced a fourth Path to Ascendancy book titled Forge of the High Mage.

== Plot ==
The novel chronologically takes place between Deadhouse Landing and Night of Knives. It continues the story of Dancer and Kellanved, their founding of the Malazan Empire, and eventual ascension.

== Critical reception ==
Kellanved's Reach received positive reviews upon publication.

Bill Capossere calls it a "well-written prequel", praising the pace and plot of the novel compared to Esslemont's earlier works.

Fantasy Book Review gave it a 9 out of 10, calling it a "fantastic addition to the trilogy" and describing it as "equal parts majestic, captivating, thrilling, funny, and mystifying".

Publishers Weekly says "Esslemont’s weird magics, intense combat, and varied characters continue to put his work at the peak of epic fantasy" but notes "extensive cast of characters and the wide scope will prevent newcomers from being able to join the story in progress."
