= Dust of Dreams =

Dust of Dreams may refer to:

- Dust of Dreams (novel), a novel in the series Malazan Book of the Fallen
- Dust of Dreams (album), a 2005 album by Merzbow
