= Stonewielder =

- Author: Ian Cameron Esslemont
- Cover artist: Steve Stone
- Language: English
- Series: Novels of the Malazan Empire
- Genre: High fantasy
- Publisher: Bantam Books (UK & Canada) & Tor Books (USA)
- Publication date: 25 November 2010
- Publication place: United Kingdom
- Media type: Print (Hardback)
- Pages: 634 pp (Bantam UK hardcover edition)
- ISBN: 0-593-06444-5 (Bantam UK hardcover edition)
- OCLC: 679929269
- Preceded by: Return of the Crimson Guard
- Followed by: Orb Sceptre Throne

Stonewielder is the third fantasy novel by Canadian author Ian Cameron Esslemont set in the world of the Malazan Book of the Fallen, co-created with Esslemont's friend and colleague Steven Erikson. Stonewielder is the third of six novels by Esslemont to take place in the Malazan world.

== Plot ==
The story takes place on the island continent of Korel, where the Malazan Empire is launching an invasion under the leadership of Greymane, also known as Stonewielder.

There is also a parallel story involving Stormguard commander, Lord Protector Hiam, who is trying to repel an attack by sea-borne creatures known as the Stormriders.

There is also a sub-plot that follows a potential outbreak of a religious war, following a local magistrate investigating a string of murders that reveals a more ancient, terrifying crime that threatens the whole nation.

== Reception ==
Booklist wrote: "The canvas is vast, the cast vaster (although there could be more backstory here for newcomers), and the whole Malazan Empire saga is rapidly approaching the size and popularity of Robert Jordan's Wheel of Time. Proceed accordingly." Blogcritics said: "Stonewielder is not an easy read by any stretch of the imagination, but it is an immensely satisfying one." Theaker's Quarterly Fiction called it "a well-polished, confident and commercial novel". Fantasy Literature said: "Some of the storylines lag a bit here and there, some parts feel a bit stretched or repetitive, but there’s no doubt Stonewielder is not simply an improvement but a big jump up in class and the first of Esslemont’s Malazan books I can fully recommend." Elitist Book Reviews called it Esslemont’s best novel to date. Reactor re-read the novel and one of the reviewers wrote: "I thought when I read this the first time it was the best of Esslemont’s works to this point, and I can’t say I’ve changed my mind in the reread." The other reviewer said: "I feel rather meh about the whole thing. Sure, there were aspects that I enjoyed and some of the action sequences were very well written. But I found that the storylines just didn’t seem to hang together all that well."
