= Garden of the Moon =

Garden of the Moon may refer to:

- Garden of the Moon (album), an album by Lana Lane
- Garden of the Moon (film), a 1938 American comedy film
- Gardens of the Moon, a novel by Steven Erikson
