= Deadhouse Landing =

2017 novel by Ian Cameron Esslemont

- Author: Ian Cameron Esslemont
- Cover artist: Steve Stone
- Language: English
- Series: Path to Ascendancy
- Genre: High fantasy
- Publisher: Bantam Books (UK & Canada) & Tor Books (USA)
- Publication date: 14 November 2017 (US), 23 August 2018 (UK)
- Publication place: United Kingdom
- Media type: Print (hardback)
- Pages: 400 pp (Tor US hardcover edition)
- ISBN: 0-765-37947-3 (Tor US hardcover edition)
- Preceded by: Dancer's Lament
- Followed by: Kellanved's Reach

Deadhouse Landing is the second novel of the Path to Ascendancy trilogy by Canadian author Ian Cameron Esslemont. Set in the world of the Malazan Book of the Fallen, Deadhouse Landing tells the story of the founding of the Malazan empire.

== Development ==
In a 2016 interview with The Critical Dragon, Esslemont states he has three novels planned for his Path to Ascendency series, and that Deadhouse Landing is the working title for the second volume. He goes on to state "the door is open" for further novels, and the series could "prove as long as it need be to tell its tale".

== Plot ==
The novel picks up where Dancer's Lament left off, with Dancer and Kellanved fleeing Itko Kan to the city of Malaz. It continues the story of their founding of the Malazan Empire and eventual ascension.

== Critical reception ==
Deadhouse Landing received mostly positive reviews upon publication.

Bill Capossere says the story is "filled with humor, tension, and a surprising amount of warmth and emotion". He praises the action in the novel while being critical in the amount of setup for its sequel.

Fantasy Book Review gave it a 9 out of 10, calling it a "masterclass of Malazan awesomeness" and that it "may be Esslemont's finest book to date".

The Quill to Live gave it an 9.5 out of 10, stating "the writing was fun, the dialogue was punchy, and the plot was involving."

Publishers Weekly describes it as a "tremendous prequel" and says it will "[delight] fans of truly epic fantasy".
