= Forge of Darkness =

2012 novel by Steven Erikson

- First edition cover
- Author: Steven Erikson
- Cover artist: Steve Stone
- Language: English
- Series: The Kharkanas Trilogy
- Genre: Fantasy novel
- Publisher: Bantam Press (UK & Canada) & Tor Books (USA)
- Publication date: 31 July 2012
- Publication place: United Kingdom
- Media type: Print (hardback & paperback); Ebook; Audiobook
- Pages: 662 (Bantam UK hardcover edition)
- ISBN: 0-593-06217-5 (Bantam UK hardcover edition)
- OCLC: 778422528
- Dewey Decimal: 813.6
- LC Class: PR9199.4.E745
- Followed by: Fall of Light

Forge of Darkness is the first novel of The Kharkanas Trilogy by Canadian author Steven Erikson, set before the events of the Malazan Book of the Fallen.

The novel is set 300,000 years before the events in the Book of the Fallen and explores the background of the Tiste race and their impending civil war. The novel is framed as being told by one poet to another.

== Themes ==
A major theme in the novel is how stories and history often blur together and the way the present is continuous and eternally reshapes itself in response to the past. The novel also explores several sides of an impending civil war. Tor notes that Forge of Darkness is rife with recurring themes: environmental deprivation, the creation and role of history, extinction, return to childhood, the costs of certainty, questions of religion, justice, empathy. Erikson also muses on the core questions of culture, of civilization and of being.

== Publication history ==
The novel was initially released in a hardcover edition by Bantam Books in the UK and Canada on 31 July 2012, followed by a paperback edition on 2 August 2012. Tor released the US hardcover edition on 18 September 2012 and a paperback edition on 27 August 2013. PS Publishing also released a two volume, signed and slipcased limited hardcover edition (300 copies) in October 2012 with cover art by David Gentry.

An ebook edition was also released by both publishers. The novel's audiobook, voiced by Daniel Philpott, was released by Brilliance Audio on 16 September 2014. Tor had released excerpts of the novel's prelude and the first five chapters during July and August 2012.

== Critical reception ==
The novel has received generally positive review from critics. SFSite praised the scope of Erikson's imagination and narrative while noting that the novel would far exceed any and all expectations that readers of the Malazan Book of the Fallen could possibly harbor. Reviewers have also noted the philosophical meanderings in the story and similarities in Erikson's fiction and historical or philosophical treatises, while praising the scope and breadth of the narrative.

While prequels generally rob readers of the narrative tension at the outset, Tor notes that Erikson avoids this pitfall by placing the story thousands of years in the past with long-lived characters that actually span the time period. Critics also praised Erikson's genius in weaving together multiple themes and characters but criticized the pacing of the novel due to the "characters’ penchant for introspection or philosophizing".
