= The Bonehunters =

2006 novel by Steven Erikson

- Author: Steven Erikson
- Cover artist: Steve Stone
- Language: English
- Series: Malazan Book of the Fallen
- Genre: High fantasy
- Publisher: Bantam (UK & Canada) & Tor Books (US)
- Publication date: 1 March 2006
- Publication place: United Kingdom
- Media type: Print (hardback & paperback)
- Pages: 1,232 (UK paperback edition)
- ISBN: 0-593-04630-7 (UK paperback edition)
- OCLC: 62307735
- Preceded by: Midnight Tides
- Followed by: Reaper's Gale

The Bonehunters is a fantasy novel by Canadian author Steven Erikson, the sixth volume in his epic fantasy series, the Malazan Book of the Fallen. The Bonehunters is a direct sequel to the fourth volume, House of Chains, and alludes to events in the fifth, Midnight Tides.

== Publishing ==
The novel was first published in the United Kingdom as a hardcover on 1 March 2006. The first mass-market paperback edition appeared in April 2007. The first United States edition was published in September 2007.

== Plot summary ==
The Bonehunters begins two months after the events of House of Chains. The Malazan Fourteenth Army has destroyed the army of the Whirlwind, and Adjunct Tavore Paran has executed Sha'ik. Pressing westward the Fourteenth pursues the remnants of the Whirlwind rebellion (under Leoman of the Flails), as it seeks refuge in the fortress city of Y'Ghatan, where the Malazan Empire had previously faced its greatest defeat. When Malazan forces attempt to take the city, Leoman unleashes a destructive fire that tears the city apart. The few Malazans who escape are re-christened The Bonehunters.

Meanwhile, Onearm's Host, restored to the favour of Empress Laseen, has landed on Seven Cities' north coast to complete the task of subduing the rebellion, despite a deadly plague. Ganoes Paran, the new Master of the Deck of Dragons, arrives from Genabackis to help deal with the chaos. With the assistance of the god Shadowthrone, Paran contains the plague by outwitting the goddess Poliel - now an ally of the Crippled God - but is too late to save Dujek, who succumbs. Paran is declared the new leader of the Host.

Elsewhere, Mappo is separated from Icarium due to the machinations of the Nameless Ones. The manipulative Taralack Veed is instated as Icarium's new companion, and leads him into the clutches of the Letherii Empire. The Letherii are seeking challengers to fight Emperor Rhulad, and this call is answered by Karsa Orlong. The Letherii clash at sea with the Bonehunters, who are able to escape due to a display of magic by Quick Ben.

The Bonehunters return to the heart of the Malazan Empire, where a confrontation between Tavore and the Empress Laseen results in a flight from the city. Laseen's endless scheming has trapped her in an allegiance with the ruthless Mallick Rel. The escape seemingly claims the life of the assassin Kalam, while Quick Ben is spirited away by Shadowthrone to join a defense of the First Throne against the Letherii. There, Icarium unleashes his full power, placing Taralack Veed in a state of permanent terror. As the Bonehunters depart the Malazan Empire, they are joined by a group of Tiste Andii, among which is Anomander Rake's son Nimander.

== Reception ==
Publishers Weekly called the book "weighty and grim" and claimed that Erikson manages to "keep fans engaged as myriad plot lines tangle and sprawl." SF Site wrote: "[...] Erikson's prose rips along at full gallop -- his characters are delightful, his ideas and story concepts inspired, and his firm control of an unfathomably vast web of plot is nothing short of masterful."
