= Dancer's Lament =

2016 novel by Ian Cameron Esslemont

- Author: Ian Cameron Esslemont
- Cover artist: Steve Stone
- Language: English
- Series: Path to Ascendancy
- Genre: High fantasy
- Publisher: Bantam Books (UK & Canada) & Tor Books (USA)
- Publication date: 25 February 2016
- Publication place: United Kingdom
- Media type: Print (Hardback)
- Pages: 416 pp (Bantam UK hardcover edition)
- ISBN: 0-593-07434-3 (Bantam UK hardcover edition)
- Followed by: Deadhouse Landing

Dancer's Lament is the first novel of the Path to Ascendancy trilogy by Canadian author Ian Cameron Esslemont. Set in the world of the Malazan Book of the Fallen, Dancer's Lament tells the story of the founding of the Malazan empire.

== Development ==
In a 2016 interview with The Critical Dragon, Esslemont states he intended Dancer's Lament to be a potential new starting point in the Malazan world. He goes on to say he has plans for three novels in the Path to Ascendancy series, but "the door is open" for further books.

== Plot ==
Dancer's Lament takes place before The Malazan Book of the Fallen. It tells the story of how Dancer and Kellanved meet and found the Malazan Empire.

== Critical reception ==
Dancer's Lament received mostly positive reviews.

Bill Capossere called it "a highly entertaining origin story" that was "streamlined, tightly-plotted and structured."

Fantasy Book Review gave it an 8 out of 10, calling it "a brilliant return to one of the most majestic and mystifying fantasy worlds ever to be created."

The Quill to Live gave it an 8.5 out of 10, calling it "good, probably even great" but noting it falls short "due to its lack of heavy hearted scenes."
