= The Healthy Dead =

2004 novella by Steven Erikson

- First edition cover
- Author: Steven Erikson
- Cover artist: Edward Miller
- Language: English
- Series: The Tales of Bauchelain and Korbal Broach
- Genre: Fantasy, Novel
- Publisher: PS Publishing, Night Shade Books
- Publication date: 1 April 2004
- Publication place: United Kingdom, United States
- Media type: Print (Hardback & Paperback)
- Pages: 150 p. (Night Shade edition)
- ISBN: 1-904619-08-8 (PS Publishing), ISBN 1597800066 (Nightshade)
- OCLC: 64393622
- Preceded by: Blood Follows
- Followed by: The Lees Of Laughter's End (2007)

The Healthy Dead is a novella by Canadian author Steven Erikson, set in the world of his Malazan Book of the Fallen epic fantasy series. It continues the story line of Bauchelain, Korbal Broach and Emancipor Reese, three characters who had a cameo appearance in the novel Memories of Ice and were the focus for the previous novella, Blood Follows.

The novella was published in the United Kingdom by PS Publishing in 2004, and in the United States by Night Shade Books in December 2005.

The follow-up to The Healthy Dead is The Lees Of Laughter's End, also published by PS Publishing in 2007. The follow-up novella actually takes place in a gap of time between the end of Blood Follows and the beginning of The Healthy Dead, although it was written later.

== Plot (Publisher's Summary) ==
The city of Quaint's zeal for goodness can be catastrophic, and no one knows this better than Bauchelain and Korbal Broach, two stalwart champions of all things bad. The homicidal necromancers—and their substance-addled manservant, Emancipor Reese—find themselves ensnared in a scheme to bring goodness into utter ruination. Sometimes you must bring down civilization... in the name of civilization.
