= Blood Follows =

2002 novella by Steven Erikson

- United Kingdom cover
- Author: Steven Erikson
- Cover artist: Mike Dringenberg
- Language: English
- Series: The Tales of Bauchelain and Korbal Broach
- Genre: Fantasy novel
- Publisher: PS Publishing, Night Shade Books
- Publication date: 30 April 2002
- Publication place: United Kingdom, United States
- Media type: Print (Hardback & Paperback)
- Pages: 125 p. (Nightshade edition)
- ISBN: 1-902880-34-X (PS Publishing), 159780004X (Nightshade)
- OCLC: 270730912
- Followed by: The Healthy Dead

Blood Follows is a novella by Steven Erikson set in the world of the Malazan Book of the Fallen. The events of this book take place prior to those in the main series, and do not necessarily concern the main story plot line.

Originally published only in Europe by PS Publishing in 2002, the hard cover version had a run of only 300 copies, while the first and second edition paperback versions each had 500 copies printed. All of the first editions were signed by the author. The introduction to the original printing is by Stephen R. Donaldson, an acknowledged fan of Steven Erikson's work.

In 2005, Blood Follows was re-published in the United States by Night Shade Books. Again, there was a limited run of signed copies.

== Characters ==
Blood Follows details the story of three characters previously introduced in Memories of Ice. Focusing mainly on Emancipor Reese, and the events that lead to his becoming the manservant of two mysterious travelers.

- Bauchelain - A mysterious traveler, a self purported scholar and a summoner of notable power.
- Korbal Broach - His silent partner, a necromancer and a eunuch.
- Emancipor Reese - Called "Mancy" for short, a tired man with an ungrateful family to care for. Emancipor has had a run of foul luck and is in desperate need of a job.
- Subly - Emancipor's wife; Subly is a strong willed woman, who views her status in society as more important than anything else. She has a sharp tongue and will not tolerate Emancipor being unemployed.
- Sgt. Guld - A gruff Sergeant of the Guard, renowned for his ability to solve murders, he has been charged by the King to discover the mysterious killer, and end the terror gripping Lamentable Moll.

== Reviews ==
- Review by Jonathan Strahan (2002) in Locus, #495 April 2002
- Review by Edward Bryant (2003) in Locus, #505 February 2003
- Review by Paul Di Filippo (2003) in Asimov's Science Fiction, April 2003
- Review by Scott Andrews (2006) in Heliotrope, August 2006
