= The Wurms of Blearmouth =

Book by Steven Erikson

- Author: Steven Erikson
- Original title: The Wurms of Blearmouth: A Tale of Bauchelain & Korbal Broach
- Language: English
- Series: The Tales of Bauchelain and Korbal Broach
- Genre: Fantasy novel
- Publisher: PS Publishing
- Publication date: 1 June 2012
- Media type: Print (Paperback)
- Pages: 208 pp
- ISBN: 0-765-32426-1
- OCLC: 0765324261
- Preceded by: Crack'd Pot Trail

The Wurms of Blearmouth is the fifth novella written by Canadian author Steven Erikson, set in the world of the Malazan Book of the Fallen. It follows the adventures of the duo, Bauchelain and Korbal Broach, along with their suitably phlegmatic manservant, Emancipor Reese.
