= White Man Falling =

2006 novel by Mike Stocks

- First edition cover
- Author: Mike Stocks
- Language: English
- Genre: Comedy novel
- Publisher: Alma Books
- Publication date: 2006
- Publication place: United Kingdom
- Media type: Print (Hardback & Paperback)
- Pages: 296 pp (first edition, hardback)
- ISBN: 978-1-84688-009-4 (first edition, hardback) ISBN 978-1-84688-036-0 (paperback)
- OCLC: 68772627

White Man Falling is the debut novel by British author Mike Stocks. It won the 2006 Goss First Novel Award.
