= Fall of Light =

2016 novel by Steven Erikson

- TOR Publishing US variant cover
- Author: Steven Erikson
- Language: English
- Series: The Kharkanas Trilogy
- Genre: High fantasy
- Publisher: Bantam (UK & Canada); Tor Books (USA)
- Publication date: 21 April 2016 (UK); 26 April 2016 (US)
- Publication place: United Kingdom
- Media type: Print (hardback & paperback); Audiobook; Ebook
- Pages: 864 (Bantam hardcover)
- ISBN: 9780593062197 (Bantam paperback)
- Preceded by: Forge of Darkness
- Followed by: Walk in Shadow (forthcoming)

Fall of Light is the second novel in the Kharkanas Trilogy written by Canadian author Steven Erikson. The story is divided into three main plot threads told from major and minor character POVs. The first tells the story of the Tiste race as they struggle to find their place in a society now divided into three factions — Andii, Liosan and Deniers — and which is on the brink of civil war. The second tells the story of the Jaghut who have now declared war against Death itself, and of various groups and races who have answered this call to arms. And the last tells the story of the Azathanai K'rul who has gifted the world sorcery, yet now finds himself vulnerable against his own kin.

The novel was published on 21 April 2016 in the United Kingdom by Bantam Books, and on 26 April 2016 in the United States by Tom Doherty Associates, an imprint of Macmillan Publishers. Although Erikson found it harder to finish the novel compared to his previous works, Fall of Light won high praise from critics and fellow authors, some even hailing it as one of Erikson's best works to date.

Several critics have praised the themes of love, empathy and compassion, and the Shakespearean tone and style of the novel. Others have praised it for its timely social commentary, with one critic noting how on a deeper level it conveys the terror and awfulness of war, and how it can affect every individual, young or old.

== Plot ==
With the absence of Anomander Rake it falls to his brother, Silchas Ruin, to prepare for the inevitable confrontation against Urusander's Legion. He orders the Hust Legion, controversially, to bolster its ranks, after their massive loss from the poisoning at the hands of Hunn Raal, by recruiting prisoners from the mining pits. He also sends Prazek Goul and Dathenar, sergeants in his brother's Houseblades, to serve as lieutenants in the Hust Legion, a decision some among the Houseblade find hard to swallow.

The historian, Rise Herat, and the High Priestess of Dark, Emral Lanear, make plans to depose of Draconus by turning the Sons of Darkness against him. Their plan includes corresponding with Syntara, the High Priestess of Light.

The Azathanai, Grizzin Farl, also called the Protector, remains at Kharkanas for purposes unknown to anyone but newly befriended Silchas Ruin, to whom he reveals that by his presence alone he keeps away the wolves that are his kin who would look at the Tiste civil war as an opportunity to sink their teeth into something delicious.

Remaining within the Chamber of Night, Mother Dark tests her powers through Endest Silann, gifting him the sorcery of Eternal Night.

Sharenas Ankhadu confronts Vatha Urusander with the results of her investigations regarding the pogrom of the Deniers. She reveals to him all that she had uncovered and had been witness to regarding Hunn Raal. It becomes more than apparent that Urusander is losing his grip on the Legion, and that Hunn Raal and some few others are part of a conspiracy in which they would stand against the commander if confronted. In lieu of all this, Sharenas takes it upon herself to cull Urusander's camp.

The blessing of Light has gifted Hunn Raal with sorcery, and he now fashions the new title of Mortal Sword for himself. His careless display of said power attracts the attention of the Azathanai Olar Ethil, the Goddess of flames, awakener of heat; lust, desire, bloodlust. She cautions him in her contempt to temper and restrain his power, for there were forces more than capable of crushing him beneath their feet. For all but altruistic reasons, she also instructs him to find a master smithy and to build her a fire so that she could guide them to the First Forge where he would be able to forge the Sceptre of Light, as Draconus had forged the Sceptre of Night, thereby bringing a much needed balance between the apposing forces.

Hundreds and thousands flock to Omtose Phellack, the home of the Jaghut civilization, to give answer to the impossible war that Hood has declared against Death.

Anomander Rake, accompanied by Caladan Brood, wanders the Burned Forrest in search for his brother Andarist, while Draconus, the Suzerain of Night, forges a sword that would defy Chaos.

== Characters ==
- Anomander Rake - the First Son of Darkness, and leader of House Purake.
- Draconus - the Suzerain of Night, and Consort to Mother Dark.
- K'rul - an Azathanai who gifts sorcery to the world.
- Caladan Brood - an Azathanai High Mason, companion of Anomander Rake.
- Silchas Ruin - the Second Son of Darkness, brother of Anomander Rake, and defender of Kharkanas in his stead.
- Grizzin Farl - an Azathanai also known as the Protector.
- Mother Dark - the Goddess of the Tiste Andii and ruler of Kharkanas.
- Hunn Raal - Captain in Urusander's Legion, and Mortal Sword of Light.
- Vatha Urusander - Commander of the Legion, and Father Light.

== Major themes ==
As with Malazan Book of the Fallen, the major themes of the novel are love, compassion and empathy. Bill Capossere of Tor.com noted that the core of the story deals with the "heart"; the one power that stands all too often unremarked, unwitnessed, unworshipped.

== Style ==
Regarding the style, a critic noted that much like Forge of Darkness, Fall of Light is written in Shakespearean style and tone, although there are more elements of comic relief and respites from the darkness in this one compared to the first.

Another critic noted that the novel boils down to the big Erikson "event" moments paired off and contrasted against very deep personal moments. Much like in Forge of Darkness, the focus falls more squarely on the personal, and through these individuals, Erikson gives a bigger picture of the massive convergences happening, which amounts to a far more Shakespearean tone, with comedy, love, and tragedy all thrown together. He further noted how scenes early on in the novel foreshadow and set the tone for the rest of the narrative.

== Background ==
On February 28, 2012, Erikson confirmed in a reddit AMA session that the second novel in the Kharkanas Trilogy would be titled Fall of Light, and that it would be published a few years after Forge of Darkness.

In a subsequent reddit AMA session held in 2014, Erikson revealed that he had spent an inordinate amount of time working on the second novel (in the Kharkanas trilogy), more than he'd done in any of his previous ones. Tackling his ten volume series, the Malazan Book of the Fallen, he had neatly evaded the dreaded second book syndrome that plagues trilogies, so he was thoroughly unprepared for Fall of Light taking so much out of him. He further revealed that he'd never had issues structuring his stories, until then, and that as a result he had become more and more uncertain regarding the matter. But, he concluded, he'd finally gotten the hang of it and was more confident of its completion than he was before.

The novel would ultimately be published in 2016.

== Publication history ==
The novel was first released by Bantam in the United Kingdom and Canada as a Hardcover edition on 21 April 2016. And subsequently on 26 April 2016 in the United States by Tom Doherty Associates, an imprint of Macmillan Publishers.

An unabridged audiobook was released by Random House Audiobooks on 21 April 2016, which coincided with the UK Hardcover release. It is narrated by Barnaby Edwards.

== Reception ==
Fall of Light received widespread critical acclaim, with fellow fantasy writer Glen Cook, famed for his The Black Company series, lauding it as being a masterwork of the imagination that might be the high-water mark of the epic fantasy genre.

Writer and critic Bill Capossere of Tor.com wrote in his very positive review that while it certainly takes some time for the story to pick its pace, the wait is worth it. He stated that the book was filled with wonderfully thoughtful, intense, and important examinations of the world we live in.

Dan Ruffolo of Strange Currencies wrote that Fall of Light continues a fascinating glimpse into the history of the amazing setting of the world that was introduced in the Malazan Book of the Fallen series, and that Erikson continues his top-notch writing of both scene and dialogue. He concluded that Erikson's ability to handle even very serious scenes with exactly the right type of humour and wit made Fall of Light a pleasure to read.

The reviewer at the Critical Dragon stated that the novel builds on the ground established in Forge of Darkness, adding further depth and complexity to the world, while fleshing out the conflict and characters, which bodes extremely well for the third book, Walk in Shadow. He concluded by saying Fall of Light tells a riveting story of complex and powerful characters, with an amazing world to act as a backdrop, and key themes and concepts that give the story force and weight.

Steven Diamond of Elitist Book Reviews praised the novel, the characters and the political intrigue, but criticized Erikson's tendency to over-philosophize. He noted that although it lends a more self-evaluative and introspective tone to the novel there were moments where he wished it would have pulled back just a bit. He also noted that Fall of Light likely wouldn't sway a ton of readers, and concluded that if you liked Erikson to begin with, you'd like the book, but if you didn't then this wouldn't change your mind.
