= Dust of Dreams (novel) =

2009 novel by Steven Erikson

- Author: Steven Erikson
- Cover artist: Steve Stone
- Language: English
- Series: Malazan Book of the Fallen
- Genre: Fantasy, Novel
- Publisher: Bantam (UK & Canada) & Tor Books (USA)
- Publication date: 18 August 2009 (UK)
- Publication place: United Kingdom
- Media type: Print (Hardback & Paperback)
- Pages: 1,280 (UK paperback edition)
- ISBN: 0-7653-1655-2
- Preceded by: Toll the Hounds
- Followed by: The Crippled God

Dust of Dreams is the ninth volume of Canadian author Steven Erikson's epic fantasy series, the Malazan Book of the Fallen. It is the first book in the series to end on a cliffhanger, dealing with the fallout from Reaper's Gale, and forms the first half of the series finale. The Crippled God forms the second half and is the tenth and final novel in the series.

Dust of Dreams returns to the continent of Lether, last seen in Reaper's Gale. Adjunct Tavore leads the Malazan army into the Letherii Wastelands to fight against an unknown threat.

== Development ==
In a 2014 Q&A with Tor, Erikson says he considers Dust of Dreams to be the first half of a single, concluding book.

== Critical reception ==
Dust of Dreams received mixed reviews, largely because it was written as the first half of a single volume.

Bill Capossere says it is "in the top tier of a top-tier series", but also says, "it ends, unfortunately, with a cliffhanger, but Dust of Dreams leaves you wanting more."

SFFWorld says, "On first read it does appear to be one of the weakest of the Malazan books", but clarifies the book feels incomplete without its sequel.

SF Site said that the book "is as complex and deep as any in fantasy or science fiction". Although the review acknowledges the lack of a conclusion, it praises the book's setup for the final volume.
