= Night of Knives =

2004 novel by Ian Cameron Esslemont

- Author: Ian Cameron Esslemont
- Language: English
- Series: Novels of the Malazan Empire
- Genre: Fantasy novel
- Publisher: Bantam Books (UK & Canada) & Tor Books (USA)
- Publication date: 1 September 2004
- Publication place: United Kingdom
- Media type: Print (hardback & paperback)
- Pages: 304 pp (Bantam UK hardcover edition)
- ISBN: 0-593-05781-3 (Bantam hardcover edition) & ISBN 0-765-32371-0 (Tor paperback edition)
- OCLC: 263983948
- Followed by: Return of the Crimson Guard

Night of Knives is the first novel of the Novels of the Malazan Empire series by Canadian author Ian Esslemont, set after the prologue, but before the main body of Gardens of the Moon, the first novel in the Malazan Book of the Fallen.

== Plot summary ==
Night of Knives takes place in the 24 hours leading up to the night of the "Shadow Moon", a night on which a prophecy promises the return of the Emperor. Kiska is a young and enterprising girl who knows the Malaz City inside out and yearns to escape the dreary island and into the Malazan military. On the other hand, Temper, former bodyguard to Dassem Ultor, the legendary First Sword of the Empire, wants to stay beyond notice of the powers now converging on the city. In the city, the mages of Malaz, much reduced since the cull, now face an almost impossible task as an ancient power draws close.

== Reviews ==
- Review by Sue Thomason (2005) in Vector 243
- Review by uncredited (2007) in Vector 253
