= Reaper's Gale =

Seventh book of the Malazan Book of the Fallen series

- Author: Steven Erikson
- Language: English
- Series: Malazan Book of the Fallen
- Genre: Fantasy
- Publisher: Bantam (UK & Canada) & Tor Books (USA)
- Publication date: 7 May 2007
- Publication place: United Kingdom
- Media type: Print (hardback & paperback)
- Pages: 1,280 (UK paperback edition)
- ISBN: 0-593-04631-5 (UK hardcover edition)
- OCLC: 76851610
- Preceded by: The Bonehunters
- Followed by: Toll the Hounds

Reaper's Gale is a fantasy novel by Canadian author Steven Erikson, the seventh volume in his epic fantasy series, the Malazan Book of the Fallen. Reaper's Gale is a direct sequel to both the fifth and sixth volumes, Midnight Tides and The Bonehunters.

The novel was first published in hardcover and trade paperback in the United Kingdom on 7 May 2007, in Canada on 5 June 2007, and in the United States on 4 March 2008.

== Synopsis ==
=== The Challengers ===
The book brings Champions back from various cultures with the Tiste Edur fleet to challenge Rhulad Sengar, emperor of Letheras. Among them are Icarium with Taralack Veed, Karsa Orlong with Samar Dev, a Seguleh girl found unconscious near MoI, and a monk from Cabal. Icarium begins acting strangely, and Taralack Veed starts doubting that Icarium can beat Rhulad. Samar Dev believes Karsa will die, despite Karsa's confidence. All the challengers die except Karsa and Icarium. Karsa fights Rhulad and severs Rhulad's sword arm, then uses all his ghosts and the ones in Samar's knife to manipulate the sword's power and travel to the Crippled God's island. There he flips the Crippled God's tent, slays Rhulad, slaps Withal and enters a portal aimed vaguely at his home after refusing to take the sword for himself (which was apparently the Crippled God's plan ever since Karsa left Laederon). Withal and the Nachts destroy the sword.

=== The Shake ===
Varat Taun warns Twilight of what Icarium can do, so she flees up the coast. We learn she is a princess of the Shake. At Maiden Island she confronts Brullyg who declared himself king and makes herself Queen. Deadsmell makes some comments about the Shake's descent from the original Tiste Andii guardians of the Shore (but also having Tiste Edur blood).

=== The Awl war ===
Redmask unites the Awl and initially defeats the Letherii army he encounters, but before long the Letherii begin to make progress against him. A clash ensues. Redmask's two K'chain Che'Malle guardians decide that Redmask is unsuitable for the K'chain Che'Malle and execute him mid-battle. The Letherii win and the Awl are slaughtered. Toc the Younger sacrifices himself to save a dozen or so Awl children, witnessed by Tool. The Barghast, who had been watching the battle, slaughter the Letherii forces in response to Toc's death.

=== Refugium ===
The Refugium is dying. Menandore teams up with Sheltatha Lore and Sukul Ankhadu to try and take Scabandari's Finnest, but Quick Ben defeats them and Hedge slays Sheltatha and Menandore. Sukul gets away, but is then killed by the three T'lan Imass who had wanted to usurp Ulshun Pral, but chose to sacrifice themselves to help their clan escape. Onrack the Broken and Trull Sengar defend the portal entrance. Silchas Ruin, Clip, Wither, Kettle, Udinaas, Seren and Fear come through. Silchas, Clip and Wither try to kill the rest. In the resulting fight Fear is slain by Clip; Wither is destroyed by Seren; while Clip is defeated by Trull and retreats. The rest are wounded except Silchas who takes the Finnest, but then mostly stops for fear of Kilava Onass. He stabs Kettle and makes a new Azath. Kettle is revealed to be a seed of the Azath. Scabandari's soul is imprisoned inside the new Azath. The survivors recover and Quick Ben, Hedge, Trull and Seren teleport to Letheras.

=== Letheras ===
The marines arrive outside the capital only to be met by a large Letherii army. Beak dies to save them from a giant wave of magic. The Tiste Edur, realizing they were about to be sacrificed, return to their ancestral home. The main Malazan army arrives by sea and clashes with the main Letherii army, allowing the marines to enter the city and head for the citadel. Fiddler's group make it to the coliseum, where Trull has found his dead brother and is promptly stabbed and killed by Sirryn Kanar.

Brys Beddict returns from the undead. Feather Witch tries to make him the mortal sword of her new Errant cult, but the Errant drowns her. Brys gives Pinosel and Urkel the name of the sea-god so they can restrain it. The Huntress kills Hannan Mosag. Brys kills Karos Invictad. The Rat Catchers' Guild pays people to shout Tehol's name. Tehol is pronounced Emperor by the will of the people and marries Janath.

Icarium tries to replicate K'rul's forging of the warrens by slitting his wrists and walking into one of his magic constructions. It is broken and explodes outwards in a big white wave which kills people directly and indirectly (i.e. by debris). The ones killed directly appear to have their spirits sucked out of them. Among the affected are Taralack Veed and Rautos Hivanar. Triban Gnol and Senior Assessor also die, and Varat Taun surrenders.

== Reception ==
Publishers Weekly stated that "the plethora of characters, attacks and counterattacks, hidden schemes and battling gods will mostly appeal to serious fans of brutal and complex epics," and calls the book "bloody and dour."
