= This River Awakens =

1998 book by Steven Erikson

- Author: Steve Lundin
- Language: English
- Genre: Novel
- Publisher: Hodder and Stoughton
- Publication date: 1998
- Publication place: Canada; United Kingdom; United States
- Media type: Print (Paperback)
- Pages: 359 pp
- ISBN: 0-340-69637-0
- OCLC: 38864470
- LC Class: ACQUISITION IN PROCESS (COPIED)

This River Awakens is the first novel by Canadian author Steve Lundin, best known by his pseudonym Steven Erikson. The book was first published in 1998, with funding by the Manitoba Arts Council.

== Plot summary ==
The novel starts in the spring of 1971 and ends a year later, with the changing seasons being used to illustrate changes in the themes of the novel. The novel is set in the fictional town of Middlecross, Canada, a small town not far from the city. Owen Brand and his family move to Middlecross in an attempt to escape poverty. Twelve-year-old Owen falls in with a gang of three boys and forms a strong bond with Jennifer, the rebellious daughter of a violent alcoholic. In the summer break from school, Owen and his friends find a body washed up on the riverbank. The discovery sends reverberations through the small community.

== Style and themes ==
The novel deals with the coming of age of the young characters, and with the past troubles of the adult characters.
