= Malazan Book of the Fallen =

Fantasy book series by Steven Erikson

- Ebook cover of the series
- Gardens of the Moon; Deadhouse Gates; Memories of Ice; House of Chains; Midnight Tides; The Bonehunters; Reaper's Gale; Toll the Hounds; Dust of Dreams; The Crippled God
- Author: Steven Erikson
- Language: English
- Genre: High fantasy
- Publisher: Tor Books (US); Bantam Press (UK); Subterranean Press (Limited Edition)
- Published: 1 April 1999 – present
- Media type: Print: Paperback; Hardcover; Digital: Audiobook; E-book
- No. of books: 26
- Followed by: The Kharkanas Trilogy; The Tales of Witness; Novels of the Malazan Empire; Path to Ascendancy

The Malazan Book of the Fallen (/məˈlæzən/) is a series of epic fantasy novels written by the Canadian author Steven Erikson. The series, published by Bantam Books in the U.K. and Tor Books in the U.S., consists of ten volumes, beginning with Gardens of the Moon (1999) and concluding with The Crippled God (2011). Erikson's series presents the narratives of a large cast of characters spanning thousands of years across multiple continents.

His stories present complicated series of events in the world upon which the Malazan Empire is located. Each of the first five novels is relatively self-contained, in that each resolves its respective primary conflict; however, many underlying characters and events are interwoven throughout the works of the series, binding it together. The Malazan world was co-created by Steven Erikson and Ian Cameron Esslemont in the early 1980s as a backdrop to their GURPS roleplaying campaign. In 2004, Esslemont began publishing his own series of six novels set in the same world, beginning with Night of Knives. Although Esslemont's books are published under a different series title – Novels of the Malazan Empire – Esslemont and Erikson collaborated on the storyline for the entire sixteen-book project and Esslemont's novels are considered to be as canonical and integral to the series' mythos as Erikson's own.

The series has received widespread critical acclaim, with reviewers praising the epic scope, plot complexity and characterizations, and fellow authors such as Glen Cook (The Black Company) and Stephen R. Donaldson (The Chronicles of Thomas Covenant) hailing it as a masterwork of the imagination, and comparing Erikson to the likes of Joseph Conrad, Henry James, William Faulkner, and Fyodor Dostoevsky.

== Books ==
=== List ===
Tor.com published a reading order based on the approximate chronological order of events in the series.

#	Title	Series	Approximate Word Count	1st Publication
1	Gardens of the Moon	Malazan Book of the Fallen #1	205k	1999 April 1
2	Deadhouse Gates	Malazan Book of the Fallen #2	264k	2000 September 1
3	Memories of Ice	Malazan Book of the Fallen #3	346k	2001 December 6
4	House of Chains	Malazan Book of the Fallen #4	298k	2002 December 2
5	Midnight Tides	Malazan Book of the Fallen #5	265k	2004 March 1
6	Night of Knives	Novels of the Malazan Empire #1	92k	2004 September 1
7	The Bonehunters	Malazan Book of the Fallen #6	355k	2006 March 1
8	The Tales of Bauchelain and Korbal Broach, Volume 1	The Tales of Bauchelain and Korbal Broach #1-3	68k	2009 September 15
9	Reaper's Gale	Malazan Book of the Fallen #7	378k	2007 May 7
10	Toll the Hounds	Malazan Book of the Fallen #8	391k	2008 June 30
11	Return of the Crimson Guard	Novels of the Malazan Empire #2	273k	2008 August 15
12	Dust of Dreams	Malazan Book of the Fallen #9	371k	2009 August 18
13	Stonewielder	Novels of the Malazan Empire #3	233k	2010 November 25
14	The Crippled God	Malazan Book of the Fallen #10	376k	2011 February 15
15	Orb Sceptre Throne	Novels of the Malazan Empire #4	217k	2012 February 20
16	Blood and Bone	Novels of the Malazan Empire #5	227k	2012 November 22
17	Forge of Darkness	The Kharkanas Trilogy #1	292k	2012 August 2
18	Assail	Novels of the Malazan Empire #6	207k	2014 August 5
19	Fall of Light	The Kharkanas Trilogy #2	355k	2016 April 26
20	Dancer's Lament	Path to Ascendancy #1	144k	2016 February 25
21	The Tales of Bauchelain and Korbal Broach, Volume 2	The Tales of Bauchelain and Korbal Broach #4-6	123k	2018 September 20
22	Deadhouse Landing	Path to Ascendancy #2	130k	2017 November 15
23	Kellanved's Reach	Path to Ascendancy #3	112k	2019 February 19
24	Upon a Dark of Evil Overlords	The Tales of Bauchelain and Korbal Broach #7		2020 October 31
25	The God is Not Willing	The Tales of Witness #1	191k	2021 July 1
26	Forge of the High Mage	Path to Ascendancy #4	151k	2023 April 6
27	No Life Forsaken	The Tales of Witness #2		2025 October 23
28	Legacies of Betrayal	The Tales of Witness #3		2026 October 1
TBA	Walk in Shadow	The Kharkanas Trilogy #3		TBA
TBA	Unnamed	The Tales of Witness #4		TBA
TBA	Unnamed	Path to Ascendancy #5		TBA
TBA	Unnamed	Path to Ascendancy #6		TBA
TBA	Time's Cursed Cartwheel	The Tales of Bauchelain and Korbal Broach #8		TBA
TBA	Unnamed	The Tales of Bauchelain and Korbal Broach #9		TBA

=== Malazan Book of the Fallen ===
This is the main series, written by Steven Erikson, and commenced, in terms of publication order, before any of the other series. This first novel, Gardens of the Moon, was shortlisted for a World Fantasy Award. The second novel, Deadhouse Gates, was voted one of the ten best fantasy novels of 2000 by SF Site.

=== The Tales of Bauchelain and Korbal Broach ===
The first three novellas were published together as The Tales of Bauchelain and Korbal Broach, Volume 1. The Tales of Bauchelain and Korbal Broach, Volume 2 includes the second three novellas.

- Blood Follows (2002)
- The Healthy Dead (2004)
- The Lees of Laughter's End (2007)
- Crack'd Pot Trail (2009)
- The Wurms of Blearmouth (2012)
- The Fiends of Nightmaria (2016)
- Upon a Dark of Evil Overlords (2020)
- Time's Cursed Cartwheel (TBA)

=== Novels of the Malazan Empire ===
Novels of the Malazan Empire is a six-part novel series written by Ian Cameron Esslemont. The novels cover events simultaneous with the Book of the Fallen, like the mystery of the Crimson Guard, the succession of the Malazan Empire, the situation on Korel and Jacuruku and the mystery of Assail.

=== The Kharkanas Trilogy ===
The Kharkanas Trilogy is a prequel series written by Steven Erikson after the completion of the main series. The series deals with the Tiste before their split into darkness, light and shadow. It sheds light on the events that are often hinted at in the background of Malazan Book of the Fallen. Many of the important Tiste characters from the Malazan Book of the Fallen make an appearance like Anomander Rake, Draconus, Spinnock Durav and Andarist.

=== Path to Ascendancy ===
The Path to Ascendancy is a prequel series set in the world of Malazan, written by Ian Cameron Esslemont. The stories deal with the early adventures of Dancer and Kellanved (Dorin and Wu, in this series) and their eventual rise to power on Quon Tali.

=== The Tales of Witness ===
The Tales of Witness is a series written by Steven Erikson as a sequel to the main series featuring Karsa Orlong and his quest to destroy civilization.

In July 2024, Erikson stated that the series would now be four novels instead of the planned trilogy, as the second novel needed to be split in two.

The third book of the series Legacies of Betrayal is expected to be released on October 1, 2026.

- The God Is Not Willing (2021)
- No Life Forsaken (2025)
- Legacies of Betrayal (2026)

== Conception ==
Subterranean Press Numbered Edition

Steven Erikson's Signature in Deadhouse Gates, Sub Press Edition

The Malazan world was originally created by Steven Erikson and Ian Cameron Esslemont in 1982 as a backdrop for role-playing games using a modified version of Advanced Dungeons & Dragons. By 1986, when the GURPS system had been adopted by Erikson and Esslemont, the world had become much larger and more complex, approaching its current scope. It was then developed into a movie script entitled Gardens of the Moon. When this was not successful in finding interest, the two writers agreed to each write a series set in their shared world. Steven Erikson wrote Gardens of the Moon as a novel in the period 1991-92 but it was not published until 1999. In the meantime, he wrote several non-fantasy novels. When he sold Gardens of the Moon, he agreed to a contract for an additional nine volumes in the series. The contract with Bantam UK was worth £675,000 making it "among the largest fees ever paid for a fantasy series".

Ian Cameron Esslemont wrote the Novels series from 2004 to 2014.

After finishing the two main series, Erikson and Esslemont continued on to further projects in the Malazan universe. While writing the last novels in The Malazan Book of the Fallen, Erikson decided that his next project, The Kharkanas Trilogy, would be a "trilogy traditional in form," saying the following: "If the Malazan series emphasized a postmodern critique of the subgenre of epic fantasy, paying subtle homage all the while, the Kharkanas Trilogy subsumes the critical aspects and focuses instead on the homage."

At one point, Steven Erikson indicated that the two authors would collaborate on The Encyclopedia Malaz, an extensive guide to the series, which was to be published following the last novel in the main sequence. In an interview on a later date, however, he mentioned talks underway with an RPG 20D group to produce a game adapted from the Malazan universe, in which case the maps and notes created by Erikson and Esslemont would be released through installments or expansions rather than through the publishing of an encyclopedia.

The Malazan world has no official unified name, although Steven Erikson has jokingly called it Wu.

In an interview with a Spanish fantasy blog, Erikson said that the hand-drawn version of the Malazan world which he had at home was too large to be photocopied; however, he also said that the maps created by fans were coming close.

== Influences ==
In a general review of The Cambridge Companion to Fantasy Literature, edited by Edward James and Farah Mendlesohn, Erikson fired a shot across the bow of "the state of scholarship in the fantastic as it pertains to epic fantasy," taking particularly to task James's opening lines in Chapter 5 of that volume. Erikson uses a handful of words from that chapter as an epigraph for a quasi-autobiographical essay in The New York Review of Science Fiction. James's sentences read in full:

J. R. R. Tolkien said that the phrase 'In a hole in the ground there lived a hobbit' came to his unconscious mind while marking examination papers; he wrote it on a blank page in an answer book. From that short sentence, one might claim, much of the modern fantasy genre emerged. Tolkien's The Lord of the Rings (1954–5) (henceforth LOTR) looms over all the fantasy written in English—and in many other languages—since its publication; most subsequent writers of fantasy are either imitating him or else desperately trying to escape his influence.

Erikson writes, "But epic fantasy has moved on, something critics have failed to notice." He goes on,

One example of this can be gleaned from my own beginnings as a writer of fantasy, which I suspect was commonplace among my colleagues. In my youth, I sidestepped Tolkien entirely, finding my inspiration and pleasure in the genre through Howard, Burroughs, and Leiber. And as with many of my fellow epic fantasy writers, our first experience of the Tolkien tropes of epic fantasy came not from books, but from Dungeons & Dragons roleplaying games ... As my own gaming experience advanced, it was not long before I abandoned those tropes ... Accordingly, my influences in terms of fiction are post-Tolkien, and they came from conscious responses to Tolkien (Donaldson's Thomas Covenant series) and unconscious responses to Tolkien (Cook's Dread Empire and Black Company series).

Erikson concludes, "So, Professor James, when you say 'since [Tolkien and The Lord of the Rings]... most subsequent writers of fantasy are either imitating him or else desperately trying to escape his influence'—sorry. You're flat-out wrong."

== Themes ==
The Malazan series contains many themes around socio-economic inequality and social injustice throughout such as gender equality with Erikson stating "It occurred to us that it would create a culture without gender bias so there would be no gender-based hierarchies of power. It became a world without sexism and that was very interesting to explore." as well as the inevitability of and role of art in civilizational collapse and many other themes rooted in a postmodernist and post-structuralist deconstruction of the fantasy genre and magical realism.

== Critical reception ==
The series was positively received by critics, who praised the epic scope, plot complexity and the introspective nature of the characterization, which serve as social commentary. Fellow author Glen Cook has called the series a masterwork of the imagination that may be the high water mark of the epic fantasy genre. In his treatise written for The New York Review of Science Fiction, fellow author Stephen R. Donaldson has also praised Erikson for his approach to the fantasy genre, the subversion of classical tropes, the complex characterizations, the social commentary — pointing explicitly to parallels between the fictional Letheras Economy and the US Economy — and has compared him to the likes of Joseph Conrad, Henry James, William Faulkner, and Fyodor Dostoevsky.

Reviewing for SF Site, Dominic Cilli says, The Malazan Book of the Fallen raises "the bar for fantasy literature", that the world building and the writing are exceptional. Cilli claims the series is written for the "most advanced readers out there.", going on to state that "Even they will have to make two passes through all ten books to fully comprehend the myriad of plotlines, characters and various settings that Erikson presents to us." Reading Erikson's "The Malazan Book of the Fallen" might be "the most challenging literary trial" a reader has ever tried, yet "the payoff is too enormous to ignore and well worth taking on the endeavor. Steven Erikson doesn't spoon feed his readers. He forces you to question and think on a level that very few authors would even dare for fear of finding and perhaps losing an audience."
