= The God Is Not Willing =

2021 novel by Steven Erikson

The God is Not Willing
- Author: Steven Erikson
- Cover artist: Steve Stone
- Language: English
- Series: The Tales of Witness
- Genre: High fantasy
- Publisher: Bantam (UK & Canada) & Tor Books (USA)
- Publication date: 1 July 2021 (UK), 16 November 2021 (USA)
- Publication place: United Kingdom
- Media type: Print (hardback & paperback)
- Pages: 496 pp (UK hardback edition)
- ISBN: 9781787632868
- Followed by: No Life Forsaken

The God is Not Willing is the first novel of The Tales of Witness by Canadian author Steven Erikson, set after the events of the Malazan Book of the Fallen. Upon its release, the book was generally praised for its prose, narrative, and worldbuilding.

== Development ==
In a 2019 interview, Erikson states he intends for The Witness Trilogy to be a single novel split into three volumes. Erikson has stated he found The God is Not Willing more difficult to structure than his previous works.

In May 2022, Erikson announced work on a sequel titled No Life Forsaken. In July 2024, Erikson stated that the series was expanding to four novels.

== Plot ==
Set a decade after the events of Malazan Book of the Fallen, the novel follows a company of Malazan marines sent to the remote region of Silver lake in northern Genabackis. The Teblor warrior Karsa Orlong has become a near-mythic figure, and his three-children Rant, Delas, and Tonith, struggle with the weight of his legacy. Meanwhile, the arrival of the malazan 9th company led by the enigmatic Lieutenant Pores, stirs old tensions between settlers and the native Teblor tribes. As ancient powers awaken and new threats emerge, the marines must navigate a fragile peace while confronting the possibility that Karsa Orlong himself may return.

== Reception ==
The novel received positive reviews upon publication. Bill Capossere from Tor.com described the novel as "a lean, sharply honed, and powerful addition to what is already in my mind the preeminent fantasy universe of the last few decades." The review also complimented the "little ways Erikson shows us a changed world."

Fantasy Book Review gave it a 10 out of 10, stating "it is beautiful, it is captivating and utterly enthralling, and it is a high-water mark for literature." Similarly, Grimdark Magazine gave the book 8 out of 10 and described it as "a worthy next step after the mighty Malazan Book of the Fallen. Not as grandiose in scope but still packed with the qualities that I previously adored." Publishers Weekly gave the book a starred review, praising the descriptive prose and details.
