= Ian C. Esslemont =

Canadian writer

Ian Cameron Esslemont
- Born: Ian Cameron Esslemont; 1962 (age 63–64); Winnipeg, Manitoba, Canada
- Occupation: Author
- Spouse: Gerri Brightwell
- Writing career
- Pen name: Ian C. Esslemont
- Language: English
- Genre: High fantasy
- Notable works: Novels of the Malazan Empire; Path to Ascendancy

Ian Cameron Esslemont (born 1962) is a Canadian writer. He was trained and has worked as an archaeologist. He is best known for his series Novels of the Malazan Empire, which is set in the same world as the Malazan Book of the Fallen epic fantasy series written by his friend and collaborator, Steven Erikson. Esslemont is the co-creator of the Malazan world.

== Biography ==
Esslemont was born in Winnipeg, Manitoba, Canada. He has lived and worked in Southeast Asia, including four years spent in Thailand and Japan. Currently, he lives in Fairbanks, Alaska with his wife, novelist Gerri Brightwell, and their three sons.

== Works ==
Esslemont and Erikson co-created the Malazan world in 1982 as a setting for a tabletop role-playing game campaign. In 1991 they collaborated on a feature film script set in the same world entitled Gardens of the Moon. When the script did not sell, Erikson expanded the story and turned it into a novel. The two writers agreed to then both write books set in the same world. Eight years later, Gardens of the Moon was published by Bantam UK and Erikson agreed to continue the story. Life and work commitments delayed Esslemont's own entries to the series until 2004, when his first novel, Night of Knives, was published as a limited edition by PS Publishing (a mass-market release by Bantam UK followed in 2007). This book was a prequel to the main Malazan sequence. His second novel, Return of the Crimson Guard, takes place within the main Malazan sequence, shortly after the events of the sixth book, The Bonehunters. It was published by PS Publishing in May 2008 and by Bantam UK later that year. Both Night of Knives and Return of the Crimson Guard have now been bought by Tor for publication in the United States. His third novel, Stonewielder, was published by Bantam UK in 2010 and Tor in the US. His fourth novel, Orb Sceptre Throne was published in 2012. In spring 2014 he signed a contract with Bantam for three more novels set in the Malazan world.

== Books ==
=== Novels of the Malazan Empire ===
This six-part series covers events roughly simultaneous with Steven Erikson's Malazan Book of the Fallen, and features the Crimson Guard, the succession of the Malazan Empire, events in Korel and Jacuruku and the mystery of Assail. A number of these events are hinted at during the course of the Malazan Book of the Fallen. Characters include Kyle, Greymane and such members of the Crimson Guard like Shimmer, Blues, K'azz, Skinner and Cowl.

Title	Published	Approximate Word Count	Pages
Night of Knives	1 September 2004	104,000	304
Return of the Crimson Guard	15 August 2008	272,000	702
Stonewielder	25 November 2010	198,000	634
Orb Sceptre Throne	20 February 2012	188,000	605
Blood and Bone	22 November 2012	183,000	586
Assail	5 August 2014	168,000	544
Approximate Total:		1,120,000	3375

=== Path to Ascendancy ===
The Path to Ascendancy is a prequel series set in the world of Malazan, written by Ian Cameron Esslemont. The stories deal with the early adventures of Dancer and Kellanved (Dorin and Wu, in this series) and their eventual rise to power on Quon Tali.

Title	Published	Approximate Word Count	Pages
Dancer's Lament	25 February 2016 (UK), 31 May 2016 (US)	145,000	416
Deadhouse Landing	15 November 2017	136,000	400
Kellanved's Reach	21 February 2019 (UK), 2 April 2019 (US)	n/a	352
Forge of the High Mage	6 April 2023 (UK)	n/a	460
