= The Crippled God =

2011 novel by Steven Erikson

- Author: Steven Erikson
- Cover artist: Steve Stone
- Language: English
- Series: Malazan Book of the Fallen
- Genre: High fantasy
- Publisher: Bantam (UK & Canada) & Tor Books (USA)
- Publication date: 15 February 2011
- Publication place: United Kingdom
- Media type: Print (Hardback & Paperback)
- Pages: 944 (UK Hardcover edition)
- ISBN: 0-593-04635-8
- Preceded by: Dust of Dreams

The Crippled God is an epic fantasy novel by Canadian author Steven Erikson, the tenth and final volume of the Malazan Book of the Fallen.

== Development ==
In a 2014 Q&A with Tor, Erikson said he considers Dust of Dreams and The Crippled God to be two halves of a single, concluding book.

== Plot ==
=== In Lether ===
After surviving the K'Chain Nah'Ruk, the Adjunct Tavore continues to lead the Bonehunters through the Wastelands. They separate from their allies to march alone through the desolate Glass Desert, an apparently suicidal decision that Tavore neglects to explain. The Bonehunters encounter the refugee children of the Snake. Both parties begin to die of thirst, inducing insanity and mutiny among the Bonehunter ranks. Tavore sacrifices her own blood to Mael in order to draw water from the ground. The army, significantly weakened, is able to complete their march, drawing close to Kolansii armies mind-controlled by Forkrul Assail.

Meanwhile, the Letherii, Bolkando, Gilk White Face Barghast, and K'Chain Che'Malle march towards the Spire in Kolanse, where the Forkrul Assail plan to use the Heart of the Crippled God to exterminate humanity. They battle with a massive army of Kolansii and Forkrul Assail, and are joined by T'lan Imass led by Onos T'oolan, and undead Jaghut led by Hood. Fener manifests over the Spire. In Darujhistan, Karsa Orlong destroys Fener's tusk, killing the god and restoring the T'lan Imass and Jaghut to life. Sinn engulfs countless combatants and the Spire in flame, seeking the Heart. Gesler and Stormy stop her, but are killed in the process. Hood slays Sister Reverence, a Forkrul Assail leader atop the Spire. Gu'Rull of the K'Chain Che'Malle delivers the Heart to the Bonehunters.

Elsewhere, the Elder Gods Errastas, Kilmandaros, and Sechul Lath free the Otataral Dragon, Korobas. They plan for her destructive power to destroy the warrens, restoring the Elder Gods to eminence among the pantheon. Draconus arrives and slays Kilmandaros and Sechul Lath, but Korobas escapes. She is assailed by frenzied Eleint who have escaped Starvald Demelain as she makes her way towards the Bonehunters, attracted by Tavore's otataral sword.

The Bonehunter marines make a stand against a Kolansii army atop a barrow in the Wastelands. The regulars, led by Tavore, defend against another army. Great Ravens arrive at the barrow and make a body for the Crippled God, with the Heart arriving to complete it. The Kolansii arrive and savage the Bonehunters, before being broken by the arrival of Quick Ben and Kalam. Korobas follows closely behind, and breaks the chains of the Crippled God. Heboric's spirit is awakened by K'rul and Mael, and together they recapture Korobas inside the barrow. Cotillion releases the Crippled God from his body, returning him to his followers in the sky.

The Bonehunter regulars face overwhelming odds against the second army, but are rescued by the arrival of High Fist Ganoes Paran and his Host. Tavore reunites with her brother and breaks down, tormented by the unknown fate of their sister.

=== In Kharkanas ===
Yedan Derryg, the Watch, commands the Shake and Letherii refugees against the Tiste Liosan on the First Shore, in defense of Kurald Galain. They face waves of Liosan soldiers, along with Soletaken dragons and Hounds of Light. Yedan Derryg personally slays several dragons and Hounds, but is killed in the last wave. Meanwhile, Sandalath Drukorlat takes the Throne of Darkness and is driven to madness by traumatic memories of her childhood in Kharkanas. This frenzies the arriving Tiste Andii Soletaken, save for Nimander Golit. He persuades Sandalath to release them, and they defeat the Liosan together with the last surviving humans.

== Reception ==
The Crippled God debuted at #12 on The New York Times best sellers list.

Bill Capossere described the novel as "the closing chapter of a work that I believe stands as the preeminent fantasy of the past 20 years and belongs high up on the short list of best ever."

The British Fantasy Society praised the novel, describing it as a "heroic fantasy that’s been dragged through the mud and kicked a few times [...] and it’s all the better for it."

SFFWorld called it "action-packed, compelling and full of wonderful scenes for the fans" but is critical of the lack of resolution in some plot threads.

Fantasy Book Review scored it 10/10, calling it "the perfect finale to one of the greatest literary achievements of the last hundred years."
