= The Kharkanas Trilogy =

Epic fantasy series by Steven Erikson

- Forge of Darkness; Fall of Light; Walk in Shadow (forthcoming)
- Author: Steven Erikson
- Country: United Kingdom; Canada; United States
- Language: English
- Genre: Epic fantasy
- Publisher: Bantam Books (UK and Canada); Tor Books (US)
- Published: July 2012–present
- Media type: Print (hardback and paperback); Digital (audiobook & e-book)
- No. of books: 2
- Followed by: Path to Ascendancy

The Kharkanas Trilogy is an epic fantasy series by the Canadian writer Steven Erikson. The series consists of three novels, two of which—Forge of Darkness and Fall of Light—have been published as of 2025. The series serves as a prequel to Erikson's Malazan Book of the Fallen series, and tells the story of the Tiste, Jaghut and Azathanai, three hundred thousand years before the Malazan Empire began its conquest on Genabackis, with a focus on characters such as Anomander Rake, Draconus, Hood, Gothos and K'rul. The series draws inspiration from the Shakespearean declamation style, and is framed as being told by one poet to another. It was received positively by critics as well as readers.

== Plot summary ==
Set 300,000 years before the events of Malazan Book of the Fallen, the story is divided into three main narratives. The first revolves around the Tiste and the events leading up to their divide into the Andii, Liosan and Edur. The second revolves around the Jaghut and the events leading up to the declaration of war on Death. The third centers on the Azathanai, some of whom are generous, while others only take advantage of the conflicts for their own benefit.

== Themes and Style ==
Like his earlier Malazan Book of the Fallen series, the Kharkanas Trilogy draws inspiration from Erikson's background as an anthropologist and archaeologist. Revelations from the Malazan series seem to be discredited as the story to give credence to the idea that the present distorts or forgets the past historic events. This is especially the case with long-lived characters. That's not to say that the styles of the two series are similar; the author made an intentional choice to the contrary. Where the Malazan series sprawled outward, the Kharkanas trilogy sprawls inward; down scaled and as close to claustrophobic as possible. The reason behind this was already alluded to in the Malazan series, where the author spoke of ambition and railing against the notion of the word being a pejorative. So since he'd already drawn inspiration from Iliad for the Malazan series, he went in another direction — Shakespearean direction. He noted that Shakespeare was all about declamations, and sentence structures dictated by breath-length, and that he'd fallen in love with it.

Characters, including lowborn ones, in both the Malazan series and the Kharkanas trilogy engage in lengthy philosophical discussions and introspection, can be attributed to the fact the author takes issue with assumption regarding the level of intelligence of people of lower social classes. In his experience, he has met numerous people who have shown evidence to the contrary.

There are themes that are running through the trilogy which relate to how civilizations destroy themselves, and one of the themes I'm advancing is that the various forms of art have to be destroyed first — the meaning of art, if you will.

— Steven Erikson, Wired's Geek's Guide to the Galaxy

Regarding the themes, again drawing inspiration from history, Erikson notes, "when art ceases to oppose — or to stand outside — the desires of the power bloc of a particular civilization, it gets into trouble".

== Development and publication history ==
=== Overview ===
Title	Published	Pages	Approximate Word Count
Forge of Darkness	August 2, 2012	688	292,000
Fall of Light	April 26, 2016	864	363,000
Walk in Shadow	Forthcoming	tba	tba

Before completing the Malazan series, Erikson was already contracted to write two Malazan-related trilogies. Working on the eighth novel in the Malazan series, Erikson already had an idea how he wanted to approach his next project. He began planting seeds by adding flashbacks and introducing characters that would set the stage for the Kharkanas Trilogy. He also approached the project with new readers as well as old readers in mind, so as to give new readers an alternative entry point in the Malazan universe, while adding enough intriguing elements to satisfy the old readers.

The first novel, Forge of Darkness, was initially released in a hardcover edition by Bantam Books in the United Kingdom and Canada on 31 July 2012, followed by a paperback edition on 2 August 2012. Tor released a hardcover edition for the American market on 18 September 2012 and a paperback edition on 27 August 2013. PS Publishing also released a two volume, signed and slipcased limited hardcover edition (300 copies) in October 2012 with cover art by David Gentry. An ebook edition was also released by both publishers. The novels' audiobook, voiced by Daniel Philpott, was released by Brilliance Audio on 16 September 2014. Tor had released excerpts of the novels' prelude and the first five chapters between July and August 2012.

Erikson found the second novel, Fall of Light, harder to write, stating that there were always too many distractions. The novel was ultimately published four years later on 21 April 2016, by Bantam in the United Kingdom and Canada as a Hardcover edition. And on 26 April 2016 by Tor Publishing, followed by the release of an Unabridged Audiobook by Random House Audiobooks on 21 April 2016, which coincided with the UK Hardcover release.

On October 25, 2017, Erikson revealed on his official Facebook page, that the third novel, tentatively titled Walk in Shadow, would be written after the completion of the first novel in the planned Karsa Orlong trilogy. This because of lower than expected sales of the previous novels in the Kharkanas Trilogy. He later added that the creative toll employing the writing style used throughout the previous books had also factored into his decision to take a break from it in order to do it justice. He also revealed that the working title of the first novel in the new trilogy would be "The God is not Willing."

== Critical reception ==
The series overall has been received very well by both critics and readers, with critics praising the themes, the narrative and the style of the novels.

Reviewing Forge of Darkness, critics also noted the philosophical meanderings in the story and similarities in Erikson's fiction and historical or philosophical treatises, while praising the scope and breadth of the narrative.

Writer and critic, Bill Capossere of Tor.com wrote in his very positive review, that while it certainly takes some time for the story to pick its pace, the wait is worth it. He stated that Fall of Light was filled with wonderfully thoughtful, intense, and important examinations of the world we live in.

Dan Ruffolo of Strange Currencies, wrote that Fall of Light continued a fascinating glimpse into the history of the amazing setting of the world that was introduced in the Malazan Book of the Fallen series, and that Erikson continues his top-notch writing of both scene and dialogue. He concluded that Erikson's ability to handle even very serious scenes with exactly the right type of humour and wit made Fall of Light a pleasure to read.

The reviewer at the Critical Dragon stated that the novel builds on the ground established in Forge of Darkness, adding further depth and complexity to the world, while fleshing out the conflict and characters, which bodes extremely well for the third book, Walk in Shadow. He concluded by saying Fall of Light tells a riveting story of complex and powerful characters, with an amazing world to act as a backdrop, and key themes and concepts that give the story force and weight.
