= Deadhouse Gates =

Novel by Steven Erikson

- Author: Steven Erikson
- Cover artist: Steve Stone
- Language: English
- Series: Malazan Book of the Fallen
- Genre: Fantasy novel
- Publisher: Bantam Books (UK & Canada) & Tor Books (USA)
- Publication date: 1 September 2000
- Publication place: United Kingdom
- Media type: Print (Hardback & Paperback)
- Pages: 943 (UK paperback edition)
- ISBN: 0-553-81311-0 (UK paperback edition)
- OCLC: 47062853
- Preceded by: Gardens of the Moon
- Followed by: Memories of Ice

Deadhouse Gates is an epic fantasy novel by Canadian writer Steven Erikson, the second installment in his Malazan Book of the Fallen series. It follows the events of the first novel, Gardens of the Moon, and takes place simultaneously with the events of the third novel, Memories of Ice.

The novel was first published in the United Kingdom as a trade paperback on 1 September 2000, followed by a mass-market paperback edition on 1 October 2001. The first United States edition was published in hardcover by Tor Books on 28 February 2005, with a mass-market paperback edition released on 7 February 2006. Notably, Deadhouse Gates is the only novel in the series where the UK and US editions share the same cover design; other US books feature different cover artists and styles.

The book received mixed to positive reviews. Critics praised its tone, the softer introduction compared to its predecessor, and its intricate plot. However, some criticized the shift in setting to another continent at the start of the story.

The narrative follows multiple storylines that eventually converge, with relentless pacing and consistently high stakes. Themes of survival, sacrifice, and the brutal realities of war are masterfully explored. Coltaine's leadership and the plight of the refugees add significant emotional weight to the story.

== Plot introduction ==
Deadhouse Gates opens a few months after the events of Gardens of the Moon. Unlike its predecessor, which followed different groups of characters operating in close proximity, the character storylines in Deadhouse Gates are often separated by hundreds or even thousands of miles.

The Malazan Empire is shaken by a purge of the nobility, with many nobles sent to the mines on Otataral Island, located off the coast of the Seven Cities subcontinent. At the same time, Seven Cities is engulfed by a rebellion known as the Whirlwind, led by the prophetess Sha'ik from the Holy Desert of Raraku.

As cities fall to the rebellion, the Malazan forces stationed in the city of Hissar devise a daring plan to evacuate overland to Aren, the Malazan continental capital. The 7th Army, commanded by the legendary Coltaine of the Crow Clan of the Wickans, is tasked with escorting 50,000 refugees on a perilous 1,500-mile march to safety. This extraordinary journey, known as the Chain of Dogs, becomes a defining legend of Seven Cities.

Meanwhile, the assassin Kalam undertakes a dangerous mission, while a group of travelers from Genabackis arrives in Seven Cities on their own mysterious quests.

== Plot summary ==
Deadhouse Gates takes place a few months after the conclusion of Gardens of the Moon, though it features few recurring characters and almost no shared settings between the two novels. The main events of Memories of Ice, the third book in the series, partially overlap with those of Deadhouse Gates.

=== Prologue and Raraku ===
Felisin Paran, the youngest sister of Ganoes Paran (a protagonist of the previous novel), and Tavore Paran, Empress Laseen's newly appointed Adjunct, become entangled in a purge of the nobility orchestrated by Laseen to eliminate rival centers of power.

During her ordeal, Felisin befriends Baudin, a hardened thug, and Heboric, an excommunicated High Priest of Fener, the war god, who has been punished by having his hands removed. The trio is sent to an otataral mine off the coast of the Seven Cities continent. There, Felisin offers her body to Beneth, the slaves' self-appointed leader, in exchange for his protection of the group. She also becomes addicted to the narcotic durhang, further complicating her plight.

Meanwhile, Icarium, a half-Jaghut immortal inventor and warrior whose destructive past has been erased from his memory to protect the world, travels with Mappo Runt, a Trell warrior secretly tasked with monitoring and, if necessary, containing Icarium's rage.

The pair becomes entangled in a conflict involving Soletaken and D’ivers—shapeshifters who can transform into a single beast or multiple beasts, respectively—who are pursuing the Path of Hands. This path leads to Tremorlor, an Azath House located in the Holy Desert of Raraku, which is believed to offer Ascendancy and the possibility of godhood.

As the battle unfolds, Icarium and Mappo find refuge in the temple of Iskaral Pust, a High Priest of Shadow whose eccentric behavior suggests he may be insane.

Meanwhile, the Wickan warleader Coltaine assumes command of the Malazan Empire's 7th Army, tasked with escorting Malazan civilians across the Seven Cities to the imperial continental capital of Aren. The journey, spanning hundreds of leagues on foot, is undertaken to protect the civilians from the impending rebellion inspired by Sha'ik, a prophetess leading the uprising from the Holy Desert of Raraku.

Despite the dire situation, the continent's High Fist, Pormqual, refuses to provide a naval convoy, choosing instead to remain sheltered within Aren. Accompanying the 7th Army on this arduous march is the Imperial Historian, Duiker.

Following the events of Gardens of the Moon, Fiddler, Kalam, Crokus, and Apsalar (formerly Sorry) arrive in Ehrlitan, one of the Seven Cities. Their original mission was to return Apsalar to her home village, but Kalam and Fiddler now plan to assassinate Empress Laseen to curtail her growing power, using the Seven Cities’ rebellion as a cover for Kalam to infiltrate her ranks.

While in Ehrlitan, Fiddler encounters a Tano Spiritwalker, a mage who casts spells through song. The Spiritwalker offers a song of power that could grant ascension to the Bridgeburners, honoring their sacrifices in the empire's dishonorable war to conquer the Seven Cities. Meanwhile, Kalam, a native of the Seven Cities, reconnects with the local resistance to Malazan rule. He agrees to deliver Dryjhna's Holy Book, a catalyst for the rebellion's Apocalypse, to Sha'ik in the Holy Desert of Raraku.

Kalam's actions draw the attention of Lostara Yil, a Red Blade loyalist captain, who uncovers his mission. Yil secretly follows him to Sha'ik, witnesses him delivering the Book of the Apocalypse and receiving an aptorian demon bodyguard as a gift, and then kills Sha'ik after Kalam departs, despite the presence of her loyal guardians, Leoman of the Flails and Toblakai.

Meanwhile, Fiddler, Crokus, and Apsalar travel separately through Raraku. As they journey, Apsalar's memories gradually reveal that the Rope—the patron god of assassins who once possessed her as Sorry—is none other than Dancer, the assassin of the previous Emperor Kellanved. It becomes evident that Kellanved and Dancer evaded Laseen's assassination attempts by ascending to godhood, claiming dominion over the new Warren and House of Shadow.

=== Whirlwind ===
With Duiker's help, Baudin and Heboric orchestrate an escape from the otataral mines during a slave mutiny and offer Felisin the chance to join them. She agrees, and the trio sets out for the coast. Along the way, Heboric discovers an enormous jade pillar, which turns out to be just the finger of a colossal figure. When he touches it with the stumps of his severed hands, the contact pulls his god, Fener, into the mortal realm. Fener is forced to flee, and Heboric's hands become tangible, blending his Denul warren's healing magic with the otataral's magic-deadening properties.

Duiker enlists the mage Kulp to retrieve the trio from the otataral island using a Malazan boat. However, the group is drawn into a mad mage's watery warren, where they come across the Silanda. On board, they find headless Tiste Andii oarsmen who still respond to commands and what appear to be Tiste Edur corpses in the captain's cabin.

The company soon encounters Logros T’lan Imass warriors led by Bonecaster Hentos Ilm, who are pursuing an unnamed quarry. The Imass reveal that the humans have entered Kurald Emurlahn, the Elder Warren of the Tiste Edur. To heal a breach in the warren, one of the T’lan Imass sacrifices themselves, taking one of the Tiste heads with them. However, the Imass leave the humans behind, forcing them to find their own way out of the warren.

Pust informs Icarium and Mappo that Sha'ik will be resurrected and reveals that an enormous wall of deadly, whirling sand now surrounds Raraku. Within the storm, shifting winds uncover buried roads, structures, and evidence that the desert was once a coastal region. Icarium and Mappo leave to seek out Sha'ik but instead encounter Fiddler, Crokus, and Apsalar, who have survived storms, rebel pursuers, and the ongoing shapeshifter battle.

The group returns to Pust's temple, where Pust's servant, Servant, is revealed to be Apsalar's father. He has somehow been transported there, though he does not know how, after surviving the Shadow Hound attack at the beginning of Gardens of the Moon.

Fiddler, Crokus, Apsalar, and Servant set out for Tremorlor, an Azath house that may offer a pathway to the Deadhouse, the corresponding Azath house in Malaz City, where Laseen holds power.

Coltaine defeats the rebel army at Hissar, the city where he assumes command of the 7th Army, and begins the march to Aren, a journey that will come to be known as the Chain of Dogs. Kamist Reloe, a High Mage of the Malazan Empire, rebels and leads a second army against Coltaine's refugees. Despite being outnumbered seven to one, Coltaine's Wickans defeat one of Reloe's tribes, convincing Duiker that Coltaine intends to do more than simply flee the rebellion.

When the refugees are trapped at a wide river between two opposing armies, Coltaine refuses to offer special treatment to the Malazan nobles under Nethpara, despite their protests. He instead sends the wagons of the wounded across the river first, secretly laying a road beneath the water. His sappers then detonate the road as the peasant army begins to cross, while Coltaine leads his forces to defeat the enemy ahead of the refugees.

Coltaine's warlocks, led by Sormo E’nath, defeat a Semk tribal god by unleashing the spirits of the land against it.

Kalam heads south toward Aren, accompanied by Apt and pursued by Yil. Along the way, he learns from rebels—whom he pretends to join—that there is a traitor, Jhistal, within Pormqual's camp in Aren. During his journey, Kalam assists a Malazan family fleeing toward Aren, helping them defeat a group of rebels. The family includes Captain Keneb and his sister-in-law Minala, both skilled warriors.

=== Chain of Dogs ===
Mappo reveals to Fiddler that he and Icarium have discovered carvings in Pust's temple resembling the Deck of Dragons, but with ancient Holds instead of modern Houses. They suspect that the shapeshifters' Path of Hands may lead to the temple itself, and that Pust hopes he and Icarium will be there to defend it.

Servant sets off for the suspected site of Sha'ik's rebirth, and Icarium, Mappo, Fiddler, Crokus, and Apsalar pursue him. They suspect that Pust, Shadowthrone, and Cotillion may have plans for Apsalar to replace Sha'ik as the rebellion's prophetess in order to lure in and kill Empress Laseen.

Kulp manages to open a rent from Kurald Emurlahn to his own Meanas warren, attracting the attention of an undead Soletaken dragon, which grants Kulp the power to heal the rent. The dragon leads the Silanda into a fire warren, and Kulp, Heboric, Baudin, and Felisin fall or leap to safety in the mundane world near Raraku as the ship, engulfed in flames, moves between warrens. Stormy, Truth, and Gesler, Kulp's escorts, are trapped aboard the burning ship.

Baudin's heroic rescue of Felisin during their flight raises suspicion in Heboric and Kulp, and he eventually admits that he is a Talon assassin sent by Tavore to protect Felisin. The group seeks refuge in a cave network to escape Raraku's whirling sand, where they find a ruined First Empire city of T’lan Imass, destroyed in mere hours by the outbreak of conflict between the Soletaken and D’ivers. They also discover signs in a Deck of Holds indicating that the Beast Hold throne is empty.

After leaving the city, they encounter a mage who identifies himself as Nawahl Ebur, but he is revealed to be the Soletaken Gryllen. Gryllen consumes Kulp, but Baudin wounds him, forcing Gryllen to flee. Baudin is critically injured, and Felisin and Heboric leave him behind. They soon come across Leoman and Toblakai guarding Sha'ik's corpse, and recognize her as Sha'ik reborn—a mantle that Felisin accepts.

As water grows scarce and raiders harry the refugees, Coltaine's group approaches the river P’atha. At one point, his warlocks Nil and Nether open a tunnel into a raider encampment to destroy it, inadvertently revealing an underground water source. They also discover that a Semk tribesman carries a piece of the destroyed Semk god sewn into him.

At the P’atha crossing, Nil and Nether sacrifice a mare to empower Coltaine's heavy cavalry, granting them the strength needed to charge up Kamist Reloe's artificial ramp. They are aided by the wayward sappers who had hidden in the ramp the previous night. Meanwhile, the marines successfully guard the wounded, and a Wickan band, tasked with protecting the refugees, defeats its attackers. Although there are casualties among the refugees, the Wickans manage to attack the flanking tribes' sides, driving them away.

Kalam and his company use a stone that Quick Ben gave Kalam, which transports them into the Imperial Warren, a realm filled with bones, to bypass Korbolo Dom's additional rebel army. Laseen's Claw, Pearl, detects the breach and meets Yil there. At Kalam's request, Apt removes 1,300 Malazan children crucified by Korbolo Dom's army and takes them to the Warren of Shadow, saving one child, Panek. Panek merges with Apt, who then trails Pearl and Yil into the Imperial Warren, following them as Pearl confronts the Semk-bound warrior, which Apt kills.

Kalam and his company exit the warren in Aren, only to find Salk Elan, who claims to be Kalam's friend, waiting for them with a ship. Though Kalam is suspicious, he has little choice but to investigate. Upon arriving in Aren, Yil is detained with the other Red Blades on suspicion of treason, while Keneb joins the city's garrison.

=== Deadhouse Gates and Epilogue ===
Icarium finds one of his own time-measuring devices, intact and 94,000 years old, amidst a destroyed First Empire city. However, he accepts Fiddler and Mappo's assurances that an ascendant or god must be responsible for the destruction. Apsalar and Servant then lead Fiddler, Crokus, Icarium, and Mappo to the threshold of what Iskaral calls a "knotted torn piece of warren," to which his false Path of Hands has led the shapeshifters. Despite the danger, they enter it because Servant can use what's inside to take them home.

Inside the warren, they find the Azath house Tremorlor. Icarium senses that the house is under siege by the shapeshifters and the damaged warren, and he plans to fight to defend it. Mappo fears that the Azath will take Icarium, a fate the Nameless Ones who chose him to guard Icarium would favor. Icarium, sensing Mappo's hesitation, tells him he would die for him. Mappo then confesses the truth about the First Empire city. Icarium tells Mappo to let the Azath have him if it takes him, even though it would mean eternal imprisonment.

As they approach the house through the battle in its surrounding maze, Shadow Hounds attempt to take Icarium after he defeats some shapeshifters. However, Mappo, Fiddler, and even Apsalar threaten to protect him. As a result, Pust is forced to break his deal to give the Azath Icarium in exchange for not taking the Hounds.

Fiddler's conch shell, with its Tano song, and munitions delivered by Quick Ben through the Trygalle Trade Guild, help to restrain the shapeshifters. Additionally, Crokus's bhoka’rala, revealed to be a Soletaken demon, becomes the guardian of Tremorlor after opening the door for the company. The interior of Tremorlor resembles a map of all Azath Houses.

Afterward, Pust, and later Icarium and Mappo, disappear to other parts of the world. Fiddler, Crokus, Servant, and Apsalar eventually find their way to Malaz City, where the Deadhouse's Guardian, Gothos, reveals that Icarium is his son. Gothos's crime was wounding a warren while trying to free him from the Azath. On his way home, Pust encounters the spider D’ivers Mogora hiding in his clothing. Uninterested in the Path of Hands, Pust watches as the dragon T’lan Imass Bonecaster, guardian of the real gate at his temple, leaves into a warren.

Kalam meets Salk Elan to learn that the Ragstopper and the entire Aren fleet have been impounded, with Admiral Nok arrested by Pormqual, who plans to flee by sea. Minala sneaks on board a trader following the Ragstopper, which Pormqual places under the charge of his treasurer. The treasurer, however, is revealed to be in league with pursuing "pirates," and Elan and Kalam work with the Marines on board to foil his plan. Kalam senses that the captain is under a glamour preventing him from revealing something important, so he contacts Quick Ben for help. Quick Ben confirms that the ship is indeed under a glamour of confusion and promises to assist Fiddler and the others as they approach Tremorlor due to the active warrens.

The ship arrives at Malaz City, and Elan reveals himself to be Pearl. He tells Kalam that, although the Empress wants to speak with him, the Claw handles its own business. Pearl then stabs Kalam and throws him overboard to face three Hands of Claws in the city. Minala catches up to him and helps. Apt and Panek appear to force Pearl to retreat before he can kill the captain and crew of the Ragstopper.

Kalam reaches Laseen's audience chamber, where she is concealed. He accuses her of deliberately killing the Bridgeburners (which she denies), outlawing Dujek, killing Dassem Ultor, killing Dancer and Kellenvad, and being incompetent in dealing with the Seven Cities. After hearing her defense and realizing he is actually talking to her remotely and she remains out of his reach, Kalam leaves.

Apt and Fiddler's group appear as Kalam and Minala leave Mock's Hold, and Shadowthrone takes them into Shadow to protect them from the Claws still pursuing Kalam. Apsalar, Crokus, and Servant express their wish to go to Apsalar's home in Itko Kan. Kalam and Minala join Apt in the new Shadow warren, where the 1,300 crucified children reside. Fiddler re-enlists to join Tavore's host.

Coltaine refuses the nobles' entreaty to retake Ubaryd. Duiker believes this is because the approaching Korbolo Dom is an experienced general and a greater threat, whereas Kamist Reloe was merely a mage. Coltaine makes the former slaves soldiers of the Seventh.

When the Chain reaches the river Vathar, the Silanda is there, and Stormy, Gesler, and Truth take the most seriously wounded on board. One of Coltaine's officers recognizes Gesler as a former captain, and when Gesler threatens to punch him if he's promoted again, Coltaine punches Gesler and breaks his own hand. Nil concludes that Gesler, Stormy, and Truth are nearly ascended.

Coltaine rejects an offer from Korbolo to let the refugees cross the river, but the nobles and refugees cross anyway. Korbolo then sends archers on floating bridges to kill them. Coltaine's sappers are among the refugees and save many, as does Sormo, who is killed in combat. A total of 20,000 refugees die.

Coltaine promotes a particularly effective sapper to sergeant, only to learn that he's demoted their captain. Past Vathar, the column passes through the remains of a war between the Jaghut and the pursuing T’lan Imass.

The Trygalle Trade Guild arrives via warren to provide food and water from Dujek and friends in Darujhistan, along with a bottle for Coltaine to crush against his chest when the time comes. All present realize that Dujek's alleged treason is false, and he fights alongside his former enemies against the Pannion Seer at the Empress's behest.

One of the three tribes facing the Chain attacks the other two and Dom's army, defeating the tribes but not the army. The tribe declares the Wickans the most powerful after they survive the multi-way fight around them.

The Chain continues south, harried by Dom's forces. Coltaine sends the refugees to buy passage with a biddable tribe to Aren, while the Wickans—and even the wounded—stand and fight to cover their retreat. Coltaine insists that Duiker keep the bottle Dujek sent him because it is more important that the empire's memory survive than its soldiers.

Aren's gates open for the refugees, but Pormqual's army does nothing to cover their flight. Kamist Reloe finally captures Coltaine before the city and crucifies him. However, the archer Squint kills him from the city wall at Duiker's urging, and thousands of crows arrive to carry off his spirit (which, in the epilogue, enters the body of a previously motionless infant in a Wickan widow's belly).

Mallick Rel urges Pormqual to sally forth to face Dom rather than wait a week for Tavore's fleet. The army is surrounded and surrenders at Rel's urging. When Duiker refers to Rel as a Jhistal, Keneb recalls Kalam mentioning a Jhistal traitor in Aren, prompting Keneb to flee into the city.

Dom crucifies Duiker and 10,000 other soldiers. Icarium and Mappo later emerge from the Azath warren on the Aren way to find Stormy, Gesler, and Truth searching for Duiker's corpse among the crucified. However, Baruk's bhok’arala servants from Darujhistan find him first, taking the bottle with his spirit in it and his body.

Icarium has lost memory of most of the events of the book, and he and Mappo continue their journey.

Felisin and Heboric travel to Sha’ik's oasis with Leoman and Toblakai, the latter of whom Heboric claims carries chained souls. Felisin instructs the others to open the holy book: Leoman sees nothing, Toblakai weeps, and Heboric refuses to touch it, disarming and throwing Toblakai when he attacks him over it.

Felisin dons Sha’ik's clothing and, using something of the goddess's power, she reads the thoughts of the High Mages: Bidithal abused Sha’ik as a child, Febryl tried to poison her three times, and L’oric is an enigma. However, all of them kneel before her in the end, along with the crowd.

Felisin accepts the goddess's power but does not give herself up entirely. She adopts a young girl and names her Felisin. The Whirlwind turns out to be a warren that Sha’ik's armies can use to travel quickly. Felisin/Sha’ik and her army travel via the warren, only to learn that Dom did not take Aren. They return to Raraku to await Tavore's advance on their own terms.

== Reviews ==
- Review by Chris Gilmore (2000) in Interzone, #159 September 2000
- Review by Carolyn Cushman (2000) in Locus, #478 November 2000
- Review by Vikki Lee (2000) in Vector 214
- Review by uncredited (2001) in Vector 220
- Review by Matthew Scott Winslow (2005) in Deep Magic, #37, June 2005
