= Memories of Ice =

2001 novel by Steven Erikson

- Author: Steven Erikson
- Cover artist: Steve Stone
- Language: English
- Series: Malazan Book of the Fallen
- Genre: Fantasy novel
- Publisher: Bantam (UK & Canada) & Tor Books (US)
- Publication date: 6 December 2001
- Publication place: United Kingdom
- Media type: Print (hardback & paperback)
- Pages: 1,187 (UK paperback edition)
- ISBN: 0-553-81312-9 (UK paperback edition)
- OCLC: 52991457
- Preceded by: Deadhouse Gates
- Followed by: House of Chains

Memories of Ice is an epic fantasy novel by Canadian writer Steven Erikson and the third volume in his series the Malazan Book of the Fallen. The events of Memories of Ice begin just after the first book, Gardens of the Moon, and at the same time as the second, Deadhouse Gates.

Memories of Ice focuses on the renegade Malazan 5th Army and their new allies on the continent of Genabackis, and their battle with the Pannion Domin, a new power emerging from the south of the continent. It also reveals a great deal more about the gods, ascendants and the history of the Imass, K'Chain Che'Malle and the Tiste races.

== Synopsis ==
=== Setting ===
The Malazan Book of the Fallen series takes place on a high fantasy world where hidden realms called warrens provide a source of magic for mages, priests and shamans. Such talented individuals may enter into bargains with gods who appear upon the world and influence its events; others may become powerful ascendants. Memories of Ice takes place on the continent of Genabackis. The Malazan Empire has subjugated the majority of the cities of the continent, concentrated in the north.

Memories of Ice takes place simultaneously with the events of Deadhouse Gates, beginning about four months after the events of Gardens of the Moon.

=== Plot ===
The Malazan 5th Army under Dujek Onearm and second-in-command Whiskeyjack has allegedly turned renegade. It joins forces with the immortal Children of Darkness led by archmage Anomander Rake and an army of 30,000 led by the warlord Caladan Brood. Together, they march for the city of Capustan to counter the threat of the Pannion Domin: an emerging empire of conquest and destruction led by the mysterious Pannion Seer, the prophet of a new religion. The army's Bridgeburners division meets with the White Face clans of the nomadic Barghast to enlist their aid, succeeding after Bridgeburner Trotts proves himself in single combat and when it is confirmed that the Barghast gods are imprisoned at Capustan.

Capustan is besieged by the Pannion Domin army. The Grey Swords mercenary company of warrior-priests lead an able defence, but are overwhelmed by the sheer numbers of starving Pannion peasants stirred into a frenzy of destruction and cannibalism. Becoming aware that their patron god, Fener, is no more (due to events in Deadhouse Gates that take place shortly before), they turn to other gods of war for patronage. Itkovian, chosen by Fener to take on the suffering of the world, confronts the cannibal's leader, Anaster, who flees in terror from Itkovian's ability. Caravan guard Gruntle becomes the mortal defender of the recently ascended god Treach when his friend is raped and beaten at Capustan, and he joins the campaign against the Pannion.

The White Face Barghast and Bridgeburners arrive to see Capustan burning. They enter the city and the following day drive the Pannion Domin out of the city and into the path of the allied army. The Pannion army is broken, Rake takes on a dragon-like form to demoralize the cannibals into surrendering, and Anaster is taken prisoner.

To the south, on the other side of the Pannion Domin, Malazan army outrider Toc the Younger emerges from the warren of chaos (having disappeared during Gardens of the Moon) with the elder god Togg present within him. Togg influences and occasionally possesses Toc in order to meet Onos T'oolan; Draconus's daughter, Lady Envy; her pets, one of whom has Togg's long-lost lover the elder god Fanderay present within; and her Seguleh swordsmen thralls. This group attacks the Pannion Domin from the south and drives the Seer to his stronghold of Coral. Having infiltrated the Pannion, Toc is captured and tortured by the Seer.

With the aid of the reclusive Moranth people, the Bridgeburners are sent ahead to the Seer's stronghold of Coral, followed by Dujek with half of the Malazan army. A battle is fought, and the Bridgeburners force their way into the city attempting to make directly for the Seer's keep. The division's mage Quick Ben along with Bargast shaman Talamandas and support of the death god Hood, evade the Pannion poisoning of the warrens in order to trap the Seer. Whiskeyjack is killed by Kallor, the second-in-command of Brood's army who had secretly allied himself with the Crippled God, the true force behind the Pannion. Rake, who had submerged the magical floating fortress Moon's Spawn to stealthily approach, flies it out of the ocean and crushes the Pannion's redoubt. Quick Ben captures the Seer and takes him through a warren as the keep collapses around them.

The Mhybe, mother of the shaman Silverfox, ages rapidly and thinks herself ruined when Silverfox appears not to love her. Thief Kruppe persuades them to reconcile after Silverfox prepares the warren of Tellann, seeded to fertility with Itkovian's memories of the pain of the T'lan Imass who gather to Silverfox's call, to receive Togg and Fanderay as lords of the Beast Hold.

The Pannion Seer is revealed to have been driven to insanity and vengeance by his and his sister's entrapment for hundreds of thousands of years, when hidden by Tool's sister Kilava in a rift to protect them from the intended genocide of the Jaghut. The Seer used the dinosaur-like K'Chain Che'Malle Matron, who was freed from the rift when he and his sister were put there, to torture Toc and to generate K'Chain soldiers. When Paran as Master of the Deck chooses mercy, Quick Ben helps free the Seer's sister from the rift. The Seer then cooperates in using his warren's ice to slow the Crippled God's poisoning of the warrens. For restoring Fanderay to him, Togg puts Toc's soul into Anaster's soulless body and restores Tool's mortality and flesh.

The bodies of the dead Bridgeburners and the leader of the Black Moranth are laid to rest inside the failing Moon's Spawn which is set adrift over the ocean. The surviving Bridgeburners retire to open a bar, where the epilogue shows them listening to the Imperial Historian Duiker tell the story of the Chain of Dogs.

Sideplots involve the Mott Irregulars, Bauchelain and Korbal Broach's necromancy and repeated drubbings by Quick Ben and the Bridgeburners, love emerging between Whiskeyjack and the Tiste Andii Korlat, and the Seguleh and Tool having to be repeatedly dissuaded from testing their prowess against one another by Lady Envy.

== Critical reception ==
In their review, the SF Site said that Memories of Ice was "easily one of the best books of the year", saying Erikson had "infused new life into one of the oldest traditions of fiction, and has done so in a manner that genuinely captures and reinterprets the spirit of the original Greek and Norse sagas."

Fantasy Book Reviews said that "Memories of Ice is a book full of wonderful characters from a wide variety of well conceived races."

Pat on Pat's Fantasy Hotlist described the novel as "an undeniable masterpiece", with the reviewer remarking that "after reading fantasy novels for well nigh two decades, I can't believe that I can still be awed to such a degree by an author's work."

James Tivendale placed Memories of Ice among his top fantasy novels and in a review for Grimdark Magazine wrote that the novel "is beautifully written and was the moment when Erikson cemented his position as a master weaver of tales that pluck the heartstrings."

Publishers Weekly described the novel's writing as "gripping" and "vivid" and stated that its release placed Erikson "near the top of the epic fantasy pantheon."
