= Gardens of the Moon =

Book One of Malazan Book of the Fallen by Steve Erikson

- First edition cover
- Author: Steven Erikson
- Language: English
- Series: Malazan Book of the Fallen
- Genre: High fantasy
- Publisher: Bantam (UK & Canada); Tor Books (US)
- Publication date: 1 April 1999
- Publication place: Canada
- Media type: Print (Hardback & Paperback); Audiobook; Ebook
- Pages: 712 (Bantam paperback)
- ISBN: 0-553-81217-3 (Bantam paperback)
- OCLC: 42953978
- Dewey Decimal: 823.92
- LC Class: PR9199.4.E745
- Followed by: Deadhouse Gates

Gardens of the Moon is a high fantasy novel by Canadian author Steven Erikson. Published on April 1, 1999, it is the first of ten novels in the series the Malazan Book of the Fallen.

The novel details the various struggles for power on an intercontinental region dominated by the Malazan Empire. It is notable for the use of high magic, and unusual plot structure. Gardens of the Moon centres around the campaign of the Malazan Empire forces to conquer the city of Darujhistan on the continent of Genabackis.

It was nominated for a World Fantasy Award. It received mixed to positive reviews, with critics praising the tone, characters, and overarching story.

== Development ==
Erikson and Ian C. Esslemont initially devised the Malazan world as a backdrop for a table-top role-playing game. Unhappy with the lack of quality adult oriented fantasy movies at the time, the duo decided to write their own movie script using their gaming experience and the world they had created. The script, titled Gardens of the Moon, was deemed too risky and failed to sell. With interest in the script seeming nonexistent, Erikson, with Esslemont's go ahead, reworked it into a fantasy novel, which he completed around 1991–92.

After meeting almost a decade of rejection, the novel was finally sold to Transworld, a division of Random House. The publisher was pleased with the work and requested additional books in the series. Using the history of the Malazan world, nine additional novels were plotted. After the publication of Gardens of the Moon, reviews spread via the internet, and Orion publications attempted to lure the writer away from Transworld. However, Transworld retained an option on additional novels in the series and offered £675,000 for the remaining nine books of the series.

== Plot ==
=== Prologue ===
The novel begins in the 96th year of the Malazan Empire, marking the twilight of Emperor Kellanved's reign. Ganoes Paran, at the age of 12, witnesses the devastating attack on the Mouse Quarter in Malaz City. Paran aspires to become a soldier in the future, despite the veteran soldier Whiskeyjack's reservations.

=== Genabackis ===
Seven years later, the Emperor and his ally, Dancer, have been assassinated and supplanted by the chief of the assassin corps. Empress Laseen now rules with the aid of the Claw, the imperial assassins. The story opens several years into a series of wars by the Malazan Empire to conquer the continent of Genabackis.

Under High Fist Dujek, the Malazan 2nd Army has been besieging the city of Pale, one of only two Free Cities left in the Malazans' path in Genabackis, for several years. Pale is holding out thanks to an alliance with the powerful Anomander Rake, Lord of Moon's Spawn (a floating fortress), leader of the non-human Tiste Andii race. Pale finally falls when Rake withdraws his fortress following a fierce battle. Even then, the Empire suffers severe losses, including the near-total destruction of a legendary elite unit in its 2nd army, known as the Bridgeburners. Several characters speculate that someone higher up within the Empire may be engineering the elimination of various people who were loyal to the late Emperor.

The Empire then turns its attention to the last remaining Free City, Darujhistan. A handful of surviving members of the Bridgeburners, led by Sergeant Whiskeyjack, now severely reduced in rank after Laseen's seizure of power, are sent to try to undermine the city from within. Once there, they attempt fruitlessly to contact the city's assassins' guild, in the hope of paying them to betray their city, but Rake has already driven the guild underground. Adjunct Lorn, second-in-command to the Empress, is sent to uncover something in the hills east of Darujhistan. She is accompanied by Onos Toolan, a T'lan Imass, an undead race that once dominated the world before humans. Meanwhile, Tattersail, one of the few mages to survive the Siege of Pale, and Paran, now a Captain and the Bridgeburners' nominal commander, head toward the city to determine the reason for the increased involvement of several gods and other magical forces in the campaign.

A group of con-artists and underworld figures within Darujhistan work to oppose members of the civic government who are considering capitulating to the Empire. Meanwhile, Anomander Rake offers his alliance to the true rulers of Darujhistan, a secretive cabal of mages. The plots collide when Adjunct Lorn releases a Jaghut Tyrant, a powerful ancient being, with the aim of either damaging Anomander Rake seriously or forcing him to withdraw from the city. The Tyrant is eventually imprisoned inside an Azath House after a fierce battle with Rake's people, while Rake himself defeats a demon lord (named The Lord of the Galayn) that Adjunct Lorn releases inside the city.

A substantial subplot involves a young Bridgeburner named Sorry. She is known as a cold-blooded killer but is in fact possessed by Cotillion, also known as the Rope, a deity and patron of assassins. When Cotillion's partner Shadowthrone and Rake negotiate the Rope's withdrawal from the events of war, Sorry is freed and falls in with Crokus, a young Daru thief. Crokus has earned the patronage of Oponn, the twin Gods of Chance, who continue to meddle in the conflict for their purposes. As the novel ends, Crokus, a Bridgeburner sapper named Fiddler, and the Bridgeburner assassin Kalam volunteer to take Sorry (now called Apsalar) back to her homeland of Itko Kan (their story continues in Deadhouse Gates).

Meanwhile, Dujek and Whiskeyjack lead the 2nd Army into rebellion against Laseen's increasingly tyrannical rule. Dujek now seeks an alliance with Rake and other enemies of Malazan against a holy war called by the Pannion Seer, whose empire is advancing from the south-east of Genabackis. Elsewhere, it is confirmed that the continent of Seven Cities has begun a mass uprising against the Empire. These and other plot developments are continued in the third novel, Memories of Ice.

== Styles and themes ==
In a 2000 interview with SFSite, Erikson says that a large part of Gardens of the Moon involved the dismantling of various conventions of the fantasy genre. He admits his fascination with ambivalence and ambiguity and says that notion of evil for its own sake, with "good heroes and insipidly stupid bad guys", is boring. Reviewers have noted Erikson's penchant of avoiding "fairy tale distinctions between good and evil", with numerous factions in the novel that cannot exclusively be considered as either. Themes such as history, myth creation and war have also been considered.

== Publication history ==
The novel was first released by Bantam in UK and Canada as a trade paperback edition followed by a mass market paperback in March 2000. In 2004, Tor released the novel in both hardcover and paperback editions in the US. Both publishers released the novel's tenth anniversary hardcover edition in 2009. It has also been released in the audiobook and ebook formats. Subterranean Press published 500 copies of a signed numbered hardcover edition and 52 copies of a signed, deluxe bound lettered edition, illustrated by Michael Komarck, in 2008.

The novel has also been translated into multiple languages including French, German, Italian, Spanish, Dutch, Bulgarian, Czech, Hungarian, Polish, Romanian, Russian, Serbian, Portuguese and Turkish.

== Reception ==
The novel received mixed to positive reviews from critics. SFSite said that Erikson had created "a fantasy world as rich and detailed as any you're likely to encounter" while calling the novel engrossing and hard to set aside. The reviewer, while calling it an astounding debut fantasy novel with a fully realized history spanning thousands of years and rich, complex characters, notes that the complexity could also be considered the book's greatest flaw. Bill Capossere of Tor said that, though the novel is not without its flaws, it is a captivating, stimulating read that defies the reader's preconceptions of fantasy and challenges their ideas of fantasy by confronting them with reality.

The Guardian described Erikson's world-building as astounding and also praised the character development, stating "His characters ... feel realistic, and their personalities actually change and adapt through the story." It also praised the deep and complex plot of the novel. In contrast, however, the reviewer criticized the pacing as awful though noted that the climactic finale was neatly done. Another reviewer has praised Erikson for breathing new life into the fantasy genre with his new ideas and creations, calling the novel "a work of great skill and beauty." Salon describes Erikson as a "master of lost and forgotten epochs, a weaver of ancient epics" while praising his realistic world-building and characterization.

On the other hand, Publishers Weekly criticized the novel's characterization and lack of real depth, stating that "The fast-moving plot, with sieges, duels (of sword and of spell), rebellions, intrigue and revenge, unearthed monsters and earth-striding gods, doesn't leave much room for real depth. Heroes win, villains lose, fairness reigns, tragedy is averted. Erikson may aspire to China Miéville heights, but he settles comfortably in George R.R. Martin country."

Gardens of the Moon also garnered praise from well-known authors in the fantasy genre, such as Stephen R. Donaldson who said "Erikson is an extraordinary writer. I read Gardens of the Moon with great pleasure." J. V. Jones praised Erikson's style and his ability to "create a world every bit as intricate and messy as our own." Adam Roberts also praised Erikson's world-building and characterization, calling the novel "fiendishly readable".

== Awards ==
- 2000 World Fantasy Award - Novel (nominated)
- 2000 Locus Award for Best First Novel (nominated)
