= Steven Erikson =

Canadian fantasy author

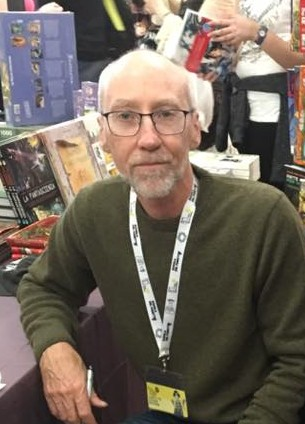
- October 2016
- Born: Steve Rune Lundin; October 7, 1959 (age 66); Toronto, Ontario, Canada
- Occupation: Author
- Children: 1
- Writing career
- Pen name: Steven Erikson
- Language: English
- Years active: 1991–present
- Period: 1991–present
- Genres: Epic Fantasy, Science Fiction, Coming of Age
- Notable works: Malazan Book of the Fallen; The Kharkanas Trilogy; The Tales of Witness; The Tales of Bauchelain and Korbal Broach; Willful Child

Signature
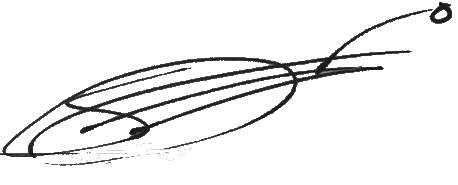

Steve Rune Lundin (born October 7, 1959), known by his pseudonym Steven Erikson, is a Canadian novelist who was educated and trained as both an archaeologist and anthropologist.

He is best known for his ten-volume spanning epic fantasy series Malazan Book of the Fallen, which began with the publication of Gardens of the Moon (1999) and was completed with the publication of The Crippled God (2011). By 2012 over 1 million copies of the series had been sold worldwide, and over 3 million copies by 2018. SF Site has called the series "the most significant work of epic fantasy since Donaldson's Chronicles of Thomas Covenant," and Fantasy Book Review described it as "the best fantasy series of recent times." Fellow author Glen Cook has called the series a masterwork, while Stephen R. Donaldson has praised him for his approach to the fantasy genre.

Set in the Malazan world, Erikson has commenced a prequel trilogy, The Kharkanas Trilogy, seven novellas, and a short story. He is currently working on a four-part sequel series, The Tales of Witness, the first book of which, titled The God is Not Willing, was published in 2021, followed by the second installment, No Life Forsaken, released in October 2025.

His foray into science fiction has produced a comedic trilogy, the Willful Child Trilogy, a spoof on Star Trek and other tropes common in the genre, and a First Contact novel titled Rejoice, a Knife To the Heart, published in 2018.

== Life and career ==
Steven Rune Lundin was born in Toronto, Ontario, and grew up in Winnipeg, Manitoba. He subsequently lived in the UK with his wife and son, but has since returned to Canada. He is an anthropologist and archaeologist by training and is a graduate of the Iowa Writers' Workshop. For his thesis at the Iowa Writers' Workshop, Erikson wrote a "story cycle" of short stories titled A Ruin of Feathers about an archaeologist in Central America. Subsequently, he received a grant to finish the work which was published by TSAR, a small Canadian publishing house. For his next work he co-won the Anvil Press International 3-Day Novel Contest for which he signed away the rights, a mistake he attributes to inexperience. Erikson's third book was also published by TSAR, and consisted of a novella and short stories titled Revolvo and other Canadian Tales. Later, upon moving to England, he sold what he refers to as his "first real novel" to Hodder and Stoughton — This River Awakens — written when he still lived in Winnipeg. Before assuming the pseudonym Erikson (as an homage to his mother's maiden name), he published his first four books, out of print as of 2007, under his real name. In addition to writing, he paints using oil paints.

== Themes ==
Erikson has stated that apart from examining the "human condition", all his literary work share "compassion" as a theme, or main driving force. Furthermore, when envisioning the Malazan world, both he and his collaborator Ian Cameron Esslemont agreed to create societies and cultures that never knew sexism and gender based hierarchies of power.

Other themes include social inequality, egalitarianism, death, life, history, and historical accuracy.

== Style ==
Erikson has stated explicitly that he enjoys playing with and overturning the conventions of fantasy, presenting characters that violate the stereotypes associated with their roles. They embody the multidimensional characteristics found in human beings, making them more realistic and giving the story more depth, which is why his books are anything but predictable. He deliberately began Gardens of the Moon mid-plot rather than beginning with a more conventional narrative. The writer's style of writing includes complex plots with masses of characters. In addition, he has been praised for his willingness to kill central characters when it enhances the plot.

=== Empathy and Emotional Transposition ===
In the same interview, Erikson reflected on how writers engage with emotional truth even when writing about unfamiliar experiences. He argued that grief, anguish, and vulnerability are universal emotional states—"Grief just is," he wrote, and the authenticity of those emotions does not depend on their source. As a writer, he explained, one must mine past experiences, like the death of a beloved pet, and transpose those emotions into new fictional contexts.

Erikson emphasized the imaginative vulnerability this requires: “This act of becoming someone else... is an act of immense vulnerability. Emotions rarely trickle into a consciousness—they flood in... and one can drown in them.” For Erikson, the process of fiction writing involves stepping outside the self, fully occupying the experience of others, and channeling empathy in service of storytelling.

== Reception ==
Word of mouth is very powerful in fantasy, and the net carries its own energy. It made a huge difference – people were picking [Gardens of the Moon] up from Amsterdam to the US.

— Steven Erikson,

The first novel of the Malazan Book of the Fallen series, Gardens of the Moon (1999), was well received. It was short-listed for a World Fantasy Award. It has also earned Erikson the reputation as one of the best authors in the fantasy genre, and was described as "An astounding début". The novel was acclaimed for its "combination of originality and intelligent, strong and exciting storytelling". The second book in the series, Deadhouse Gates (2000), was voted one of the ten best fantasy novels of 2000 by SF Site.

Fellow author Glen Cook has called the series a masterwork of the imagination that may be the high water mark of the epic fantasy genre. In his treatise written for The New York Review of Science Fiction, fellow author Stephen R. Donaldson has also praised Erikson for his approach to the fantasy genre, the subversion of classical tropes, the complex characterizations, the social commentary — pointing explicitly to parallels between the fictional Letheras economy and the US economy — and has referred to him as "an extraordinary writer", comparing him to the likes of Joseph Conrad, Henry James, William Faulkner, and Fyodor Dostoevsky.

== Influences ==
Erikson credits pen and paper Role-Playing games, specifically AD&D and GURPS, as being the biggest influence in his writing career, and even calls it the fundament of the Malazan Empire, which his Malazan Book of the Fallen series is based on. Stephen R. Donaldson's The Chronicles of Thomas Covenant and Glen Cook's The Black Company, both ushering post-Tolkien style of writing, are some of the works that have influenced his storytelling. He also credits the works of Robert E. Howard, Edgar Rice Burroughs, Homer, Arthur C. Clarke, Roger Zelazny, John Gardner, Gustav Hasford, Mark Helprin and Robin Hobb as influences on the Malazan works.

== See also ==
- 1999 in literature
- Ian Cameron Esslemont
- Novels of the Malazan Empire
- Path to Ascendancy

== Sources ==
- Melville, Peter (2015). "Witnessing the 'Unwitnessed' in Steven Erikson's The Malazan Book of the Fallen". Journal of the Fantastic in the Arts. 26 (2): 276–291. JSTOR 26321113.
