= 2012 in literature =

This article contains information about the literary events and publications of 2012.

== Events ==
- January 1 – Copyright restrictions on James Joyce's major works are lifted on the first day of the year, 70 years having passed last year since his death.
- January 20 – British novelist Salman Rushdie cancels an appearance at the Jaipur Literature Festival in India, and four other writers leave the city after reading excerpts from The Satanic Verses, which is banned in the country.
- February – James Joyce's children's story The Cats of Copenhagen is published for the first time by Ithys Press in Dublin.
- March – The discovery is announced of a collection of fairy tales gathered by the historian Franz Xaver von Schönwerth and locked in a Regensburg archive for more than 150 years.
- April – While attending the London Book Fair, the exiled Chinese writer Ma Jian uses red paint to smear a cross over his face and a copy of his banned book Beijing Coma and calls Chinese publishers a "mouthpiece of the Chinese communist party", after being "manhandled" while attempting to present the book to Liu Binjie at the fair.
- July – Jaime García Márquez tells his students that his brother Gabriel García Márquez, the Colombian writer and recipient of the 1982 Nobel Prize for Literature, has dementia, which has ended his writing career.
- September 27 – The 50th anniversary of the publication of ecological text Silent Spring by Rachel Carson is noted.
- September 28 – Sue Limb's parody of the Bloomsbury Group, Gloomsbury, begins to be broadcast on BBC Radio 4 in the U.K.
- October 24 – Boekenberg ("Book mountain"), a public library in Spijkenisse, Netherlands, designed by MVRDV, is opened.
- December – The discovery is announced of "The Tallow Candle", a previously unknown story by Hans Christian Andersen found at the bottom of a box in Denmark in October.
- unknown date
  - Precious Timbuktu Manuscripts are evacuated under threat from Islamist rebels by Dr. Abdel Kader Haidara and Stephanie Diakité.
  - An underground library in Darayya is formed in the besieged Syrian city by students.

== New books ==
=== Fiction (literary) ===
- Saud Alsanousi – The Bamboo Stalk
- Jacob M. Appel – The Man Who Wouldn't Stand Up (October 27)
- Filippo Bologna – I pappagalli (The Parrots, satire, March)
- Peter Carey – The Chemistry of Tears (May 15)
- Dan Chaon – Stay Awake (short stories, February 7)
- Emily Danforth – The Miseducation of Cameron Post (Bildungsroman, February 2)
- Stephen Dau – The Book of Jonas (March 15)
- Debra Dean – The Mirrored World
- Elena Ferrante – L'amica geniale (My Brilliant Friend, first of the Neapolitan Novels)
- Richard Ford – Canada (May 22)
- Ben Fountain – Billy Lynn's Long Halftime Walk (May 1)
- Emily Giffin – Where We Belong (July 24)
- Mark Haddon – The Red House (June 12)
- John Irving – In One Person (May 8)
- Adam Johnson – The Orphan Master's Son (January 10)
- Christian Kracht – Imperium (February 16)
- Mario Vargas Llosa – The Dream of the Celt (English translation by Edith Grossman, June 5)
- Attica Locke – The Cutting Season
- Ben Marcus – The Flame Alphabet (January 17)
- Toni Morrison – Home(May 8)
- Alice Munro – Dear Life (short story collection)
- Chibundu Onuzo – The Spider King's Daughter
- Ron Rash – The Cove (April 10)
- J. K. Rowling – The Casual Vacancy (September 27)
- Benjamin Alire Sáenz – Everything Begins and Ends at the Kentucky Club (October 30)
- Neeta Shah – Bollywood Striptease (March 27)
- Richard Wagamese – Indian Horse

=== Children and young people ===
- Claire Alexander – Back to Front and Upside Down!
- David Almond – The Boy Who Swam With Piranhas
- Hannah Barnaby – Wonder Show (March 20)
- John and Carole Barrowman – Hollow Earth (February 2))
- Emily Gravett – Matilda's Cat
- John Green – The Fault in Our Stars
- Jon Klassen – This is Not My Hat
- Josh Lacey – The Dragonsitter
- Inga Moore – Captain Cat
- Rick Riordan – The Mark of Athena
- Rainbow Rowell – Eleanor & Park
- Maggie Stiefvater – The Raven Boys (first book in The Raven Cycle)
- Mary Sullivan – Dear Blue Sky
- Jacqueline Wilson – The Worst Thing About My Sister

=== Drama ===
- Ayad Akhtar – Disgraced
- Alan Bennett
  - Cocktail Sticks
  - Hymn
  - People
- Howard Brenton – 55 Days
- Monica Byrne – What Every Girl Should Know
- Lolita Chakrabarti – Red Velvet
- James Graham – This House
- Miho Mosulishvili – My Redbreast
- Suman Mukhopadhyay – Bisarjan
- Theresa Rebeck – Dead Accounts
- Sam Shepard – Heartless
- Anne Washburn – Mr. Burns, a Post-Electric Play
- Florian Zeller – Le Père

=== Poetry ===
See 2012 in poetry

- Paige Ackerson-Kiely – My Love Is a Dead Arctic Explorer
- Marilyn Buck – Inside/Out: Selected Poems
- Mehr Lal Soni Zia Fatehabadi – The Qat'aat o Rubaiyat of Zia Fatehabadi (quatrains, translation)
- Jack Gilbert – Collected Poems
- Paul Hoover – Desolation: Souvenir
- Liu Xiaobo (刘晓波) – June Fourth Elegies (translation)
- Eileen Myles – Snow-Flake
- Lucia Perillo – On the Spectrum of Possible Deaths
- D. A. Powell – Useless Landscape, or A Guide for Boys
- W. G. Sebald – Across the Land and the Water: Selected Poems 1964–2001
- David Wagoner – After the Point of No Return

=== Science fiction and fantasy ===
- Joe Abercrombie – Red Country (November 20)
- Daniel Abraham
  - The King's Blood (May 22)
  - (writing as James S. A. Corey) – Caliban's War (June 26)
- Saladin Ahmed – Throne of the Crescent Moon (February 7)
- Aaron Allston – Mercy Kill
- Leigh Bardugo – Shadow and Bone
- John Barrowman and Carole Barrowman – Hollow Earth
- John Birmingham – Angels of Vengeance (April 10)
- Alex Bledsoe – Wake of the Bloody Angel (July 3)
- David Brin – Existence (June 19)
- Tobias Buckell – Arctic Rising (February 28)
- Orson Scott Card – Shadows in Flight (January 17)
- Samuel R. Delany – Through the Valley of the Nest of Spiders (April 17)
- Troy Denning – Fate of the Jedi: Apocalypse
- Steven Erikson – Forge of Darkness (September 18)
- Ian C. Esslemont – Orb Sceptre Throne (May 22)
- Mira Grant – Blackout (May 22)
- Jon Courtenay Grimwood – The Outcast Blade (March 26)
- Robin Hobb – City of Dragons (February 7)
- Douglas Hulick – Sworn in Steel (June 5)
- N. K. Jemisin
  - The Killing Moon (May 1)
  - The Shadowed Sun (June 12)
- Stephen King – The Wind Through the Keyhole (April 24)
- Mary Robinette Kowal – Glamour in Glass (April 10)
- Jay Lake – Calamity of So Long a Life
- Sarah J. Maas – Throne of Glass
- Paul Melko – Broken Universe (June 5)
- China Miéville – Railsea (May 15)
- Michael Moorcock – The Whispering Swarm
- Tim Powers – Hide Me Among the Graves (March 13)
- Terry Pratchett and Stephen Baxter – The Long Earth (June 19)
- Hannu Rajaniemi – The Fractal Prince (September 4)
- Alastair Reynolds – Blue Remembered Earth (June 5)
- Rick Riordan – The Mark of Athena (October 2)
- Kim Stanley Robinson – 2312 (May 22)
- Robert J. Sawyer – Triggers (April 3)
- John Scalzi – Redshirts (June 5)
- Karl Schroeder – Ashes of Candesce (February 14)
- Brian Francis Slattery – Lost Everything (April 10)
- Charles Stross – The Apocalypse Codex (July 3)
- Brent Weeks – The Blinding Knife (September 11)
- Daniel H. Wilson – Amped (June 5)
- Ben H. Winters – The Last Policeman (July 12)
- Gene Wolfe – The Land Across

=== Crime, horror etc. ===
- Ace Atkins – Lullaby (May 1)
- Laird Barron – The Croning (May 1)
- Ted Bell – Phantom (March 20)
- Alex Berenson – The Shadow Patrol (February 21)
- Steve Berry – The Columbus Affair (May 15)
- Lee Child – A Wanted Man (September 27)
- Lincoln Child – The Third Gate (June 12)
- Michael Connelly – The Black Box (November 26)
- Robert Crais – Taken (January 24)
- Justin Cronin – The Twelve (October 16)
- Clive Cussler – The Storm (June 5)
- Nelson DeMille – The Panther (October 16)
- Gillian Flynn – Gone Girl (June 5)
- Vince Flynn – Kill Shot (February 7)
- John Grisham
  - Calico Joe (April 10)
  - The Racketeer (legal thriller, October 23)
- Dean Koontz – Odd Apocalypse (July 31)
- William Landay – Defending Jacob (January 31)
- Joe R. Lansdale – Edge of Dark Water (March 12)
- Dennis Lehane – Live by Night (October 2)
- Elmore Leonard – Raylan (January 17)
- Robert R. McCammon – The Providence Rider (May 31)
- Jo Nesbø – Phantom (October 2)
- Michael Palmer – Oath of Office (February 14)
- Ridley Pearson – The Risk Agent (June 19)
- Matthew Reilly – Scarecrow Returns (January 3)
- Jeremy Robinson – Second World (May 22)
- James Rollins – Bloodline (June 26)
- Greg Rucka – Alpha (May 22)
- John Sandford – Stolen Prey (May 15)
- Scott Sigler – Nocturnal (April 3)
- Daniel Silva – Fallen Angel (July 17)
- Joseph Wambaugh –Harbor Nocturne (April 3)
- David Wellington – 32 Fangs (April 24)
- F. Paul Wilson – Nightworld (May 22)

=== Non-fiction ===
- Marty Appel – Pinstripe Empire: The New York Yankees from Before the Babe to After the Boss (May 8)
- Alison Bechdel – Are You My Mother? (memoir, May 1)
- Antony Beevor – The Second World War (June 5)
- Katherine Boo – Behind the Beautiful Forevers (February 7)
- David Byrne – How Music Works (December 12)
- Gregor Collins – The Accidental Caregiver (August 18)
- Susan Cain – Quiet: The Power of Introverts in a World That Can't Stop Talking (January 24)
- Sean Connolly – The Book of Perfectly Perilous Math (March 14)
- Charles Duhigg – The Power of Habit (February 28)
- Michael Hastings – The Operators (January 10)
- Lawrence M. Krauss – A Universe from Nothing (January 10)
- Mark Levin – Ameritopia (January 17)
- George Megalogenis – The Australian Moment
- Masha Gessen – The Man Without a Face: The Unlikely Rise of Vladimir Putin (March 1)
- Dan Jones – The Plantagenets: The Kings Who Made England (UK)
- Jonah Lehrer – Imagine (March 20)
- Rachel Maddow – Drift (March 27)
- Marilynne Robinson – When I Was a Child I Read Books (March 27)
- Michael Lind – Land of Promise (April 17)
- Jonathan Haidt – The Righteous Mind (April 2)
- E. O. Wilson – The Social Conquest of Earth (April 9)
- Nancy Gibbs and Michael Duffy – The President's Club: Inside the World's Most Exclusive Fraternity (April 19)
- Edward Humes – Garbology (book)|Garbology (April 19)
- Peter Bergen – Manhunt: The Ten-Year Search for Bin Laden, from 9/11 to Abbottabad (May 1)
- Steve Coll – Private Empire (May 1)
- Robert A. Caro – The Passage of Power: The Years of Lyndon Johnson (May 1)
- Warren Littlefield and T. R. Pearson – Top of the Rock: Inside the Rise and Fall of Must See TV (May 1)
- Thomas E. Mann and Norman J. Ornstein – It's Even Worse Than It Looks (May 1)
- Tom Holland – In the Shadow of the Sword: The Birth of Islam and the Rise of the Global Arab Empire (May 15)
- Callum Roberts – The Ocean of Life (May 22)
- Douglas Brinkley – Cronkite (May 29)
- Michelle Obama – American Grown (May 29)
- Christoph Ransmayr – Atlas of an Anxious Man (Atlas eines ängstlichen Mannes; Austria)
- Arun Shourie – Worshipping False Gods
- Amity Shlaes – Coolidge (June 26)
- Peter Watson – The Great Divide (June 26)
- Ro Khanna – Entrepreneurial Nation: Why Manufacturing is Still Key to America's Future (July 24)
- Jim Holt – Why Does the World Exist? (July 16)
- Michael D. Lemonick – Mirror Earth (October 16)
- Helaine Olen – Pound Foolish: Exposing the Dark Side of the Personal Finance Industry

== Deaths ==
- January 3 – Josef Škvorecký, Czech-born novelist and publisher (born 1924)
- January 7 – Ibrahim Aslan, Egyptian journalist and author (born 1935)
- January 19 – Shraga Gafni (On Sarig), Israeli children's author (born 1926)
- January 23 – Maurice Meisner, American historian, author, and academic (born 1931)
- January 28 – Don Starkell, Canadian diarist and author (born 1932)
- January 29 – Damien Bona, American historian and journalist (born 1955)
- January 30 – Bill Wallace, American children's author and educator (born 1947)
- February 1 – Wisława Szymborska, Polish poet and Nobel laureate (born 1923)
- February 3 – John Christopher (Samuel Youd) English science fiction novelist (born 1922)
- February 4 – Irene McKinney, American poet (born 1939)
- February 4 – John Turner Sargent Sr., American publisher (born 1924)
- February 21 – Barney Rosset, American publisher (born 1922)
- March 21 – Christine Brooke-Rose, Swiss-born English novelist and translator (born 1923)
- March 25 – Antonio Tabucchi, Italian writer (born 1943)
- March 27 – Adrienne Rich, American writer (born 1929)
- March 28 – John Arden, English playwright (born 1930)
- April 2 – Sarah Dreher, American novelist and playwright (born 1937)
- April 7 – Miss Read (Dora Jesse Shafe), English novelist (born 1913)
- April 8 – Janusz K. Zawodny, Polish-American and political scientist (born 1921)
- April 17 – Leila Berg, English children's writer and activist (born 1917)
- April 26 – Ardian Klosi, Albanian publicist and writer (suicide, born 1957)
- May 8 – Maurice Sendak, American children's author and illustrator (born 1928)
- May 12 – Walter Wink, American theologian and scholar (born 1935)
- May 15
  - Jean Craighead George, American novelist (born 1919)
  - Carlos Fuentes, Mexican novelist and essayist (born 1928)
- May 26 – Leo Dillon, American children's author and illustrator (born 1933)
- June 5
  - Ray Bradbury, American science-fiction and fantasy author (born 1920)
  - Barry Unsworth, English writer of historical fiction (born 1930)
- June 19 – Emili Teixidor, Catalan journalist and author (born 1933)
- June 23 – Marjorie Chibnall, medievalist, biographer and translator (born 1915)
- July 28 – Carol Kendall, American children's writer (born 1917)
- July 30
  - Maeve Binchy, Irish novelist, playwright and short story writer (born 1939)
  - Héctor Tizón, Argentinian writer and diplomat (born 1929)
- July 31
  - Mollie Hunter, Scottish novelist and children's writer (born 1922)
  - Gore Vidal, American novelist, playwright and political commentator (born 1925)
- August 2
  - Amos Hakham, Israeli biblical scholar (born 1921)
  - Sir John Keegan, English military historian and journalist (born 1934)
  - Gilbert Prouteau, French poet and film director (born 1917)
- August 4 – Henry Scholberg, American bibliographer (born 1921)
- August 6 – Robert Hughes, Australian critic and historian (born 1938)
- August 11 – Heidi Holland, South African journalist and author (born 1947)
- August 22 – Nina Bawden, English novelist and children's writer (born 1925)
- September 6 – Horacio Vázquez-Rial, Argentine-born Spanish writer (cancer, born 1947)
- September 8 – Jon Tolaas, Norwegian poet and novelist (born 1939)
- September 10
  - Ernesto de la Peña, Mexican writer (born 1927)
  - Hans Joachim Störig, German writer, lexicographer and translator (born 1915)
- September 12 – Arkadii Dragomoshchenko, Russian poet (born 1946)
- September 14 – Louis Simpson, American poet (Alzheimer's disease, born 1923)
- September 15 – Fred Bodsworth, Canadian writer (born 1918)
- September 20
  - Robert G. Barrett, Australian author (cancer, born 1942)
  - Tereska Torrès, French writer (born 1920)
- September 21 – Sven Hassel (Børge Pedersen), Danish novelist (born 1917)
- September 22 – Irving Adler, American author, mathematician, and scientist (born 1913)
- October 7 – Ivo Michiels (Henri Paul René Ceuppens), Belgian writer in Flemish (born 1923)
- October 21 – George McGovern, American politician and writer (born 1922)
- October 25 – Aude, Canadian novelist (born 1947)
- October 29 – J. Bernlef, Dutch writer (born 1937)
- November 2
  - Han Suyin, Chinese-born novelist (born 1916)
  - János Rózsás, Hungarian writer (born 1926)
- November 19 – Boris Strugatsky, Soviet Russian writer (pneumonia, born 1925)
- November 20 – Ivan Kušan, Croatian writer (born 1933)
- November 22 – Jan Trefulka, Czech writer and dissident (renal failure, born 1929)
- December 1 – Ahmed Taib El Alj, Moroccan playwright (born 1928)
- December 4 – Vasily Belov, Russian novelist, poet and dramatist (born 1932)
- December 6 – Jan Carew, Guyanese novelist, poet and dramatist (born 1920)
- December 16 – Fan Vavřincová, Czech screenwriter, novelist, and author (born 1917)
- December 28 – Jayne Cortez, African-American poet (born 1934)
- December 31 – Jovette Marchessault, Canadian novelist and playwright (born 1938)

== Awards ==
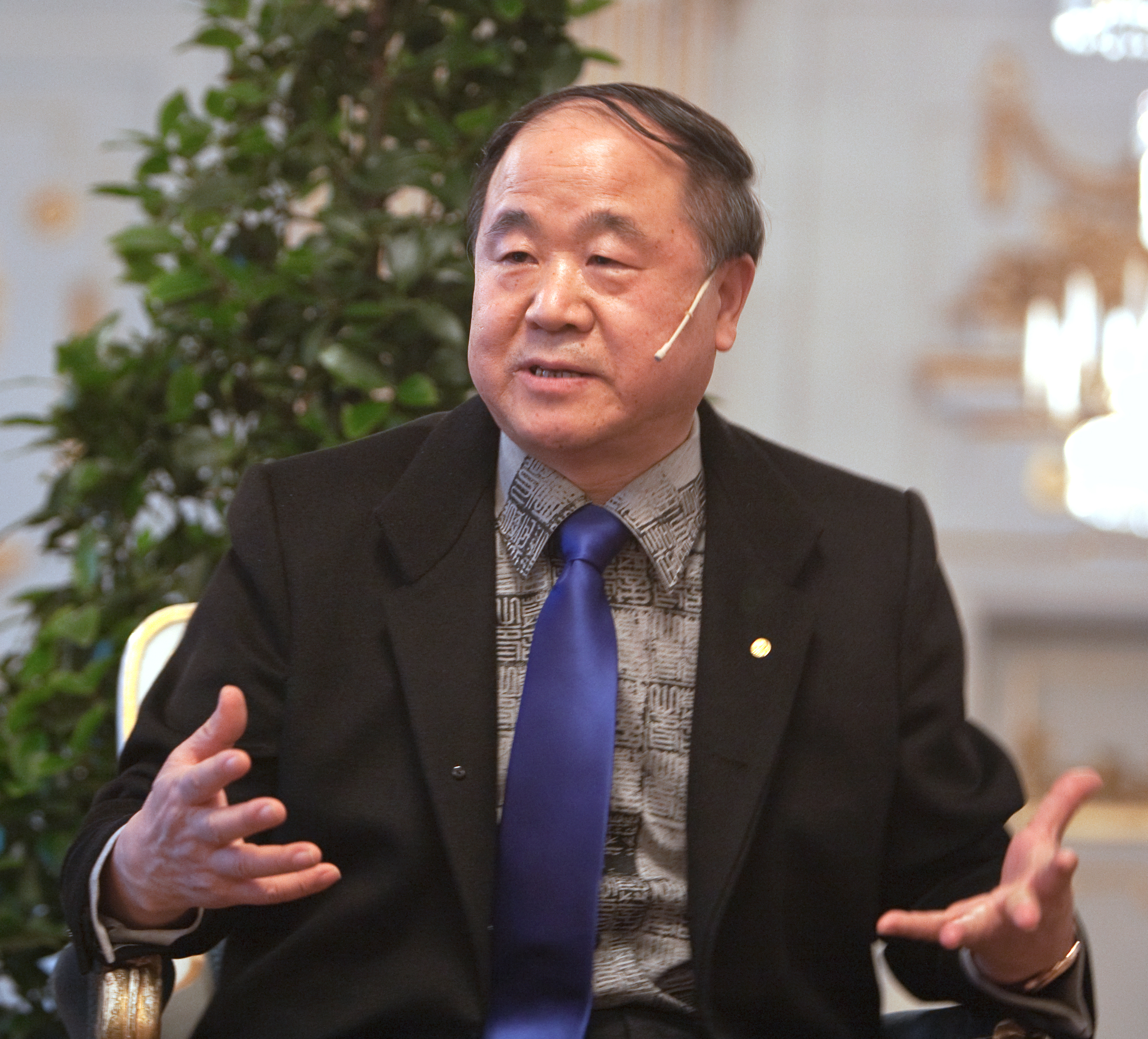
Mo Yan in Stockholm to receive the Nobel Prize in Literature

- Caine Prize for African Writing: Babatunde Rotimi, "Bombay's Republic"
- Camões Prize: Dalton Trevisan
- Carnegie Medal for children's literature: Patrick Ness, A Monster Calls
- Damon Knight Memorial Grand Master Award: Gene Wolfe
- Dayne Ogilvie Prize: Main award, Amber Dawn; honour of distinction, Mariko Tamaki.
- Edna Staebler Award for Creative Non-Fiction: Joshua Knelman, Hot Art
- European Book Prize: Rolf Bauerdick, Madonna on the moon, and Luuk van Middelaar, Europe's passage
- Friedenspreis des Deutschen Buchhandels: Liao Yiwu
- Governor General's Awards: Multiple categories; see 2012 Governor General's Awards.
- Hilary Weston Writers' Trust Prize for Nonfiction: Candace Savage, A Geography of Blood: Unearthing Memory from a Prairie Landscape
- International Dublin Literary Award: Jon McGregor, Even the Dogs
- International Prize for Arabic Fiction: Rabee Jaber, The Druze of Belgrade
- Lambda Literary Awards: Multiple categories; see 2012 Lambda Literary Awards.
- Man Booker Prize: Bring Up the Bodies by Hilary Mantel
- Miles Franklin Award: Anna Funder, All That I Am.
- National Biography Award: The Many Worlds of R. H. Mathews: In Search of an Australian Anthropologist
- National Book Award for Fiction: to The Round House by Louise Erdrich
- National Book Critics Circle Award: to Billy Lynn's Long Halftime Walk by Ben Fountain
- Nobel Prize in Literature: Mo Yan
- Orange Prize for Fiction: to The Song of Achilles by Madeline Miller
- PEN/Faulkner Award for Fiction: to The Buddha in the Attic by Julie Otsuka
- Queen's Gold Medal for Poetry: John Agard
- Rogers Writers' Trust Fiction Prize: Tamas Dobozy, Siege 13
- SAARC Literary Award: Fakrul Alam, Ayesha Zee Khan
- Scotiabank Giller Prize: Will Ferguson, 419
- Whiting Awards: Fiction: Alan Heathcock, Anthony Marra, Hanna Pylväinen; Nonfiction: Sharifa Rhodes-Pitts; Plays: Danai Gurira, Samuel D. Hunter, Mona Mansour, Meg Miroshnik; Poetry: Ciaran Berry, Atsuro Riley
- Writers' Trust Engel/Findley Award: Nino Ricci

== See also ==
- List of literary awards
- List of poetry awards
- 2012 in Australian literature

== Notes ==
- Hahn, Daniel (2015). The Oxford Companion to Children's Literature (2nd ed.). Oxford University Press. ISBN 978-0-19-871554-2.
