= Lemonick =

Lemonick is a surname. Notable people with the surname include:

- Aaron Lemonick (1923–2003), American physicist
- Michael Lemonick (born 1953), American journalist
