= Peter Usborne =

British publisher (1937–2023)

Peter Usborne CBE
- Born: Thomas Peter Usborne; 18 August 1937
- Died: 30 March 2023 (aged 85)
- Education: Summer Fields School, Oxford; Eton College, Berkshire
- Alma mater: Balliol College, Oxford; INSEAD
- Occupation: Publisher
- Years active: 1973–2023
- Known for: Usborne Publishing

Thomas Peter Usborne CBE (18 August 1937 – 30 March 2023) was a British publisher. In the early 1960s, Usborne co-founded the satirical magazine Private Eye. In 1973 he founded the children's book publisher Usborne Publishing.

== Education ==
Usborne was educated at Summer Fields School, an independent boys' boarding and day preparatory school in the city of Oxford, followed by Eton College, an independent boys' boarding school near the town of Windsor, in Berkshire. He then went up to Balliol College at the University of Oxford, followed by INSEAD business school, at the time based in Fontainebleau, in France.

== Career ==
Usborne was the first managing director of the London-based satirical magazine Private Eye from its foundation in 1961, before leaving to study at INSEAD.

After taking a position at the British Printing Corporation, he started working in children's books when he found out he was going to become a parent. Soon afterwards, in 1973, he set up his own company.

His eponymous publishing company was named Children's Publisher of the Year at the British Book Awards in both 2012 and 2020, Independent Publisher of the Year at the Independent Publishing Awards in 2014, and Private Business of the Year in 2015.

Usborne specialised in illustrated children's books: according to his Daily Telegraph obituary, most of the company's books were "conceived, written and designed in-house". Its best-known books include the Usborne Puzzle Adventure series, the World of the Unknown series the Book of the Future, Poppy and Sam's Farmyard Tales, Sticker Dolly Dressing and the That's Not My... series of touchy-feely board books for babies by Fiona Watt.

== Personal life ==
Usborne said that parenthood had been the greatest privilege of his life, and that publishing children's books had been an extension of that.

In 2007, the Usborne family founded The Usborne Foundation, a registered charity which harnesses research, design and technology to create playful media addressing issues from literacy to health. Teach Your Monster to Read is a series of games that has helped millions of children learn to read, funded by The Usborne Foundation. His son, Martin, also runs a publishing company, Hoxton Mini Press.

=== Death ===
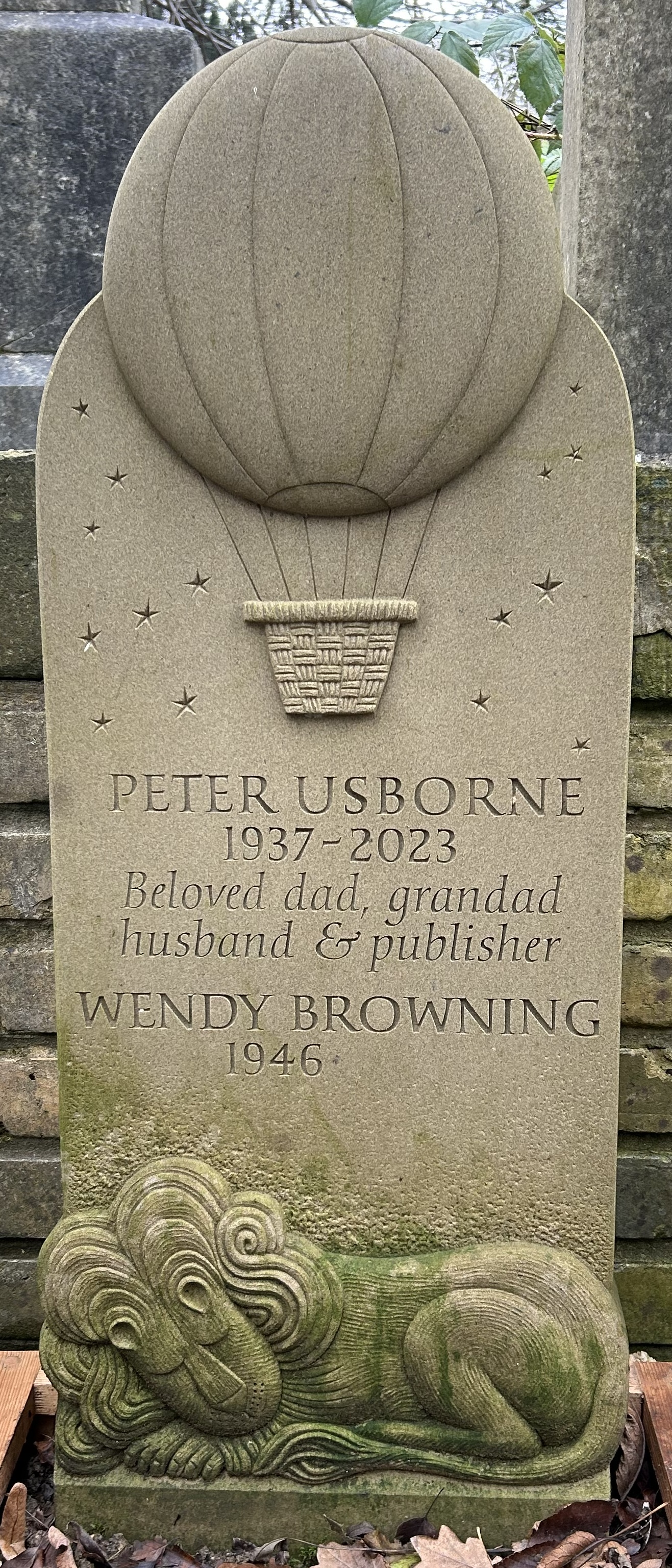
Grave of Peter Usborne, stone carved by Teucer Wilson RDI in Highgate Cemetery

On 30 March 2023, Usborne died "suddenly but peacefully", surrounded by his family. He was 85. Usborne was survived by his wife, Wendy, children Nicola and Martin, and his five grandchildren.

== Awards and honours ==
Usborne was appointed Member of the Order of the British Empire (MBE) in the 2011 New Year Honours for services to the publishing industry, and Commander of the Order of the British Empire (CBE) in the 2022 New Year Honours for services to literature. He was awarded the London Book Fair Lifetime Achievement Award in 2015.
