= London Book Fair =

Publishing trade fair

Coordinates: 51.496°N 0.211°W

The London Book Fair
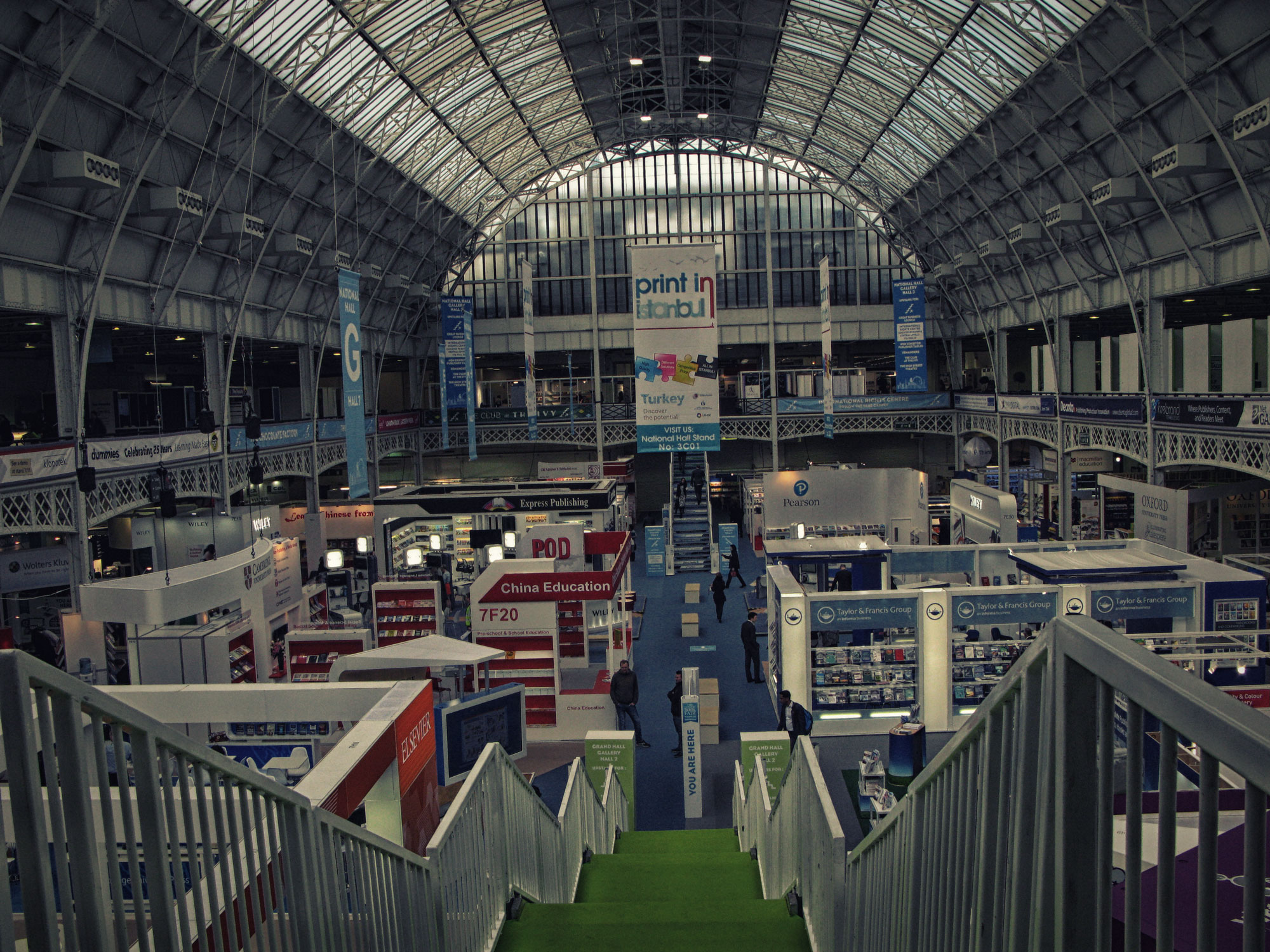
- The London Book Fair 2016, a few minutes before opening, at Olympia, London
- Status: Active
- Genre: Multi-genre
- Frequency: Annually, usually in April
- Locations: London, England
- Inaugurated: 1971; 55 years ago
- Website: www.londonbookfair.co.uk

The London Book Fair (LBF) is a large book-publishing trade fair held annually, usually in April, in London, England. LBF is a global marketplace for rights negotiation and the sale and distribution of content across print, audio, TV, film and digital channels.

== History ==
In 1971, Lionel Leventhal, with business partner Clive Bingley, organised The Specialist Publishers’ Exhibition for Librarians, with 22 exhibitors displaying titles on tabletops. Subsequently, the scope and influence of the event grew and began to encompass bigger and more general publishers. In 1975, the initials LBF made their first appearance when the fair was renamed SPEX'75: The London Book Fair. By 1977 SPEX had been dropped and the title London Book Fair was born.

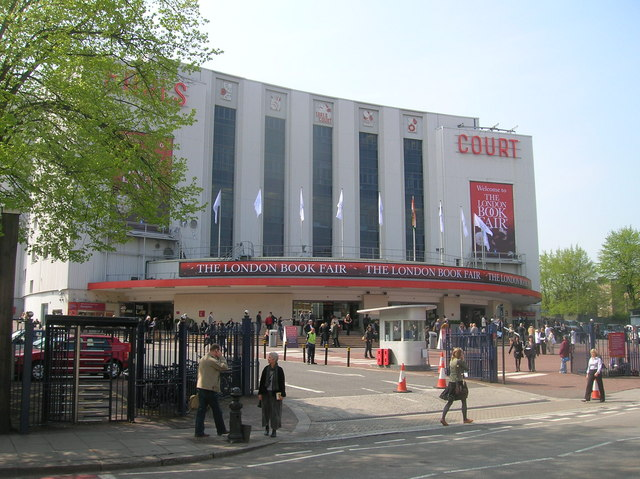
London Book Fair at Earls Court

Until 2006 the London Book Fair had been held at the Olympia exhibition centre, but it moved to the ExCeL Exhibition Centre in Custom House that year. Due to generally unfavourable feedback from attendees over the new location, such as the inconvenience of transport links or the infrastructure of the location, as well as the intervention resulting from other exhibitions and their wandering visitors, the book fair returned to west London in 2007 and took place at Earls Court Exhibition Centre from 16 to 18 April. After 2007, the London Book Fair was held at the Earls Court Exhibition Centre. In 2015 the LBF came back and took place in Olympia London on 14–16 April 2015 as part of London Book and Screen Week. After the success of the 43rd edition, in 2016, the London Book Fair stayed in Olympia.

The London Book Fair has grown in size and importance over the years and is now considered as second only to the Frankfurt Book Fair as "a mecca for European publishers, booksellers, rights agents and media trend-spotters".

Within a history of 42 years leading in the book market and exhibition, more than 25,000 publishers, booksellers, literary agents, librarians, media and industry suppliers from over 100 countries now attend the fair, according to the figures given by Jacks Thomas, Director of the London Book Fair. Book publishers come to London to publicize their upcoming titles and to sell and purchase subsidiary and translation rights for books from other publishers. More than 1700 international exhibitors participate in The London Book Fair.

The 50th event was due to take place in 2020 but was cancelled due to the COVID-19 pandemic, as a precaution.

== Events ==
The fair itself covers a wide range of interests and markets within the publishing industry, including rights negotiation and the sales and distribution of content across print, audio, TV, film and digital channels, as well as more traditional forms of print publishing. There are many activities during the whole week of the London Book Fair, ranging from business meetings between publishing companies, introductions of titles to readers and visitors, many workshops and seminars to discuss current issues and trends in the industry, and the announcement of prizes and awards.

=== Awards ===
Prizes and honours given at the LBF include the Trailblazer Awards, celebrating young talent in publishing, and the LBF International Excellence Awards, held in partnership with the Publishers' Association.

The London Book Fair Lifetime Achievement Award has been presented annually since 2004, recipients being:

- 2004 – John Lyons, Little, Brown, UK & USA
- 2005 – Lynette Owen, Pearson Education, UK
- 2006 – Christopher MacLehose, MacLehose Press, UK
- 2007 – Lord Weidenfeld, Weidenfeld & Nicolson, UK
- 2008 – Peter Mayer, Overlook Press and Duckworth, UK & USA
- 2009 – Drenka Willen, Harcourt, USA
- 2010 – Antoine Gallimard, Éditions Gallimard, France
- 2011 – Sonny Mehta, Alfred A. Knopf, Inc., US
- 2012 – Jorge Herralde, Editions Anagrama, Spain
- 2013 – Michael Krüger, Hanser Verlag, Germany
- 2014 – Deborah Rogers, Rogers, Coleridge & White, UK
- 2015 – Peter Usborne, Usborne Publishing, UK
- 2016 – Gail Rebuck, Penguin Random House, UK
- 2017 – Luiz Schwarcz, Companhia das Letras, Brazil
- 2018 – Sara Miller McCune, SAGE Publishing, US
- 2019 – Dorotea Bromberg, Brombergs Bokförlag, Sweden
- 2020 – Nigel Newton, Bloomsbury Publishing, UK
- 2021 – Margaret Busby, UK
- 2022 – Hiroshi Hayakawa, Hayakawa Publishing, Japan
- 2023 – Klaus Flugge, Andersen Press, UK
- 2024 – YoungSuk (YS) Chi, US
- 2025 – Gloria Bailey, UK

=== Conferences ===
In 2015, the event also included a dedicated conference, The Publishing Digital Minds Conference, held on the Monday before the main fair, as well as an educational programme of more than 300 seminars and events as part of the Insights Programme.

=== Video game industry ===
A new focus of LBF 2015 was the attention to the video game industry. With the development of digital technologies and an increasing level of engagement from people, especially children and young teenagers, many authors and publishers are looking for a new way to tell stories that can help readers have more interaction with the fantasy and gain new knowledge during the games. Several famous professionals from the gaming industry have been to the fair and given speeches about their ideas, concepts that help both publishing and gaming industries to push the boundaries and create a new form of media convergence.

== Market Focus programme ==
The London Book Fair Market Focus programme showcases one particular country or region of note each year, with the objective of putting the spotlight on publishing trade links with this territory, its publishing industry and the opportunities for conducting business with the rest of the world.

Market Focus countries and regions have included the Arab world, India, South Africa, Russia, Turkey, China, South Korea, Mexico, Poland, Baltic Country – Estonia, Latvia, Lithuania, Indonesia.

== London Book and Screen Week ==
Launched in 2014, London Book and Screen Week was designed to celebrate the importance of the book and the written word at the heart of creative content across all formats. Comprising a week of events, the pinnacle of the week was the London Book Fair for the 43rd edition.

Taking place in a variety of venues across the capital, London Book and Screen Week welcomed all those involved in writing, reading and creating content for book and screens in all formats from e-reader to silver screen.

It incorporated, among other things, the Publishing for Digital Minds Conference, the recently launched Tech Tuesday, writers from this year's Market Focus and a direct-to-consumer creative writing event.

The week focused on the business of publishing and storytelling from concept to consumer, shining a spotlight on authors, industry leaders, screenwriters, agents, publishers, retailers, etailers, developers, technology gurus and start-ups.

== Controversy ==
In 2012, the London Book Fair appointed China's censoring organization, the General Administration of Press and Publication (GAPP), to choose which Chinese authors would be represented at the event. Chinese authors such as Nobel Prize winner Gao Xingjian were not invited. A representative of the British Council, a large financial supporter of the book fair, applauded the decision, saying that the chosen authors were more representative because "they live in China and write their books there", in contrast with "other writers who have left." The exiled Chinese writer Ma Jian used red paint smeared across his face and a copy of his banned book Beijing Coma while he protested the event. He was also "manhandled" while attempting to present a copy of the book to Liu Binjie at the fair.

A number of international and UK media covered the China Market Focus 2012 programme, including Isabel Hilton from The Guardian.

== See also ==
- London Map Fair
