= Murder on the Midnight Plane =

Children's puzzle book

- Author: Gaby Waters
- Illustrator: Graham Round
- Cover artist: Graham Round
- Language: English
- Series: Usborne Puzzle Adventure series
- Genre: Children's literature
- Publisher: Usborne Publishing Ltd
- Publication date: 1986
- Publication place: United Kingdom
- Media type: Print (Hardcover and Paperback)
- Pages: 48
- ISBN: 0-86020-952-0 (paperback), ISBN 0-86020-953-9 (hardback)
- OCLC: 16758969
- Preceded by: The Curse of the Lost Idol
- Followed by: The Incredible Dinosaur Expedition

Murder on the Midnight Plane is book 3 in the Usborne Puzzle Adventure series of children's books. This was originally marketed as a "Solve It Yourself" book. Later this book series was renamed "Usborne Puzzle Adventures".

== Purpose of the plot ==
This plot focuses on twin siblings flying on the titular midnight plane, who have to determine who murdered the man in seat number thirteen. The clues involved in solving this mystery include ruling out the initial diagnosis of food poisoning (as the victim only ate food that was also eaten by someone else), identifying who had the opportunity to hide the poison in a box of toffees (those who refused a toffee didn't touch the box), and from there work out which of the remaining passengers had motive and opportunity to kill the victim.

== Availability ==
This title is in print. It is also available in the compendium's "Puzzle Adventure Omnibus" (ISBN 0-7460-1854-1), "Usborne Big Book of Puzzle Adventures" (ISBN 0-7460-5424-6) and the "Usborne Solve Your Own Mystery Stories" (ISBN 0-7460-0014-6).
