= Mirror Earth =

Book by Michael Lemonick

Mirror Earth: The Search for Our Planet's Twin
- Author: Michael D. Lemonick
- Language: English
- Subject: Extrasolar planets
- Genre: Non-fiction
- Publication date: October 16, 2012
- Publication place: United States
- Media type: Print (Paperback and Hardcover)
- Pages: 294 pp.
- ISBN: 978-0-8027-7900-7
- OCLC: 772106627

Mirror Earth: The Search for Our Planet's Twin is a 2012 non-fiction book by Michael D. Lemonick. It discusses the work of "exoplaneteers"—defining the term as a group of scientists looking through various other planetary systems to detect alternate planets that are suitable for possible life.

Lemonick has served as a science journalist for Time as well as an author of multiple other books such as Echo of the Big Bang. Positive reviews for his latest book appeared in publications such as Kirkus Reviews, Publishers Weekly, and The Wall Street Journal.

== Contents ==
Lemonick describes the diverse methods with which astronomers work to try to find Earth-like planets. Some evaluate images of clumps of stars, tens of thousands of them together, in order to pick up slight reductions in brightness caused by planets passing in front of their host stars, some examine individual stars for planetary gravitation influences, and others focus on stars considerably smaller than the Earth's sun to pick up more easily detectable planetary information.

== Reviews ==
The Wall Street Journal ran a supportive review by Mike Brown, a professor of planetary astronomy at Caltech. He commented that "Lemonick's interactions with these scientists is the overwhelming strength of this very human story". Brown also wrote, "By the end of this engaging book, the discovery of such a twin feels so close that you can almost taste the slightly alien water on the tip of your tongue."

Publishers Weekly praised the book, stating that it "offers readers an informal and accessible view into the work" of the 'exoplaneteers'. Kirkus Reviews ran a positive review as well. The publication described the book as a "solid overview of the cutting edge of astronomy and of the new breed of astronomers who are exploring it."

== See also ==
- 2012 in literature
- Extrasolar planet
- List of nearest terrestrial exoplanet candidates
- Planetary habitability
