= That's Not My... (book series) =

Children's book series

- Front cover of That's Not My Puppy... 20 year celebration edition (2019)
- Author: Fiona Watt
- Illustrator: Rachel Wells
- Genre: Picture book, baby book
- Publisher: Usborne Publishing
- Published: 1999–
- Media type: Print board book
- No. of books: 72
- Website: usborne.com/gb/books/browse-by-category/baby-books/that-s-not-my

That's Not My... is a series of baby and toddler children's books written by Fiona Watt, illustrated by Rachel Wells and published by Usborne Publishing. Every book focuses on a different subject, which have included animals, vehicles and people. The first book in the series was That's Not My Puppy... which was published in 1999. Each two-page spread of the books contains a different brightly coloured picture of the subject with different attributes represented by a material. The reader is introduced to the different versions of the subject of the book with the phrase "That's not my". The inclusion of materials creates a sensory experience for the reader as they are invited to feel the material and identify why the subject on the page is or is not the correct version. By 2019, the That's Not My... series had sold 6.4 million copies of over 50 books and made over £30.6 million. As of July 2022, there are 72 books in the series.

== Format ==
The books in the That's Not My... series are picture board books targeted towards babies and toddlers. They are part of the Usborne "touchy-feely" collection of books; the collection consists of books which contain patches of material on brightly coloured pictures which the reader is invited to feel. The Oxford Companion to Children's Literature (2015) describes the That's Not My... series as "novelty books", which are books which contain "an element other than paper or card". Each book is square and made out of cardboard. Every two-page spread contains a different picture of the subject of the book. The subject of the books include animals, vehicles, people (such as pirates and Santa), and fantasy creatures. In each book, different attributes of the subject are represented by contrasting materials. The material is incorporated into the picture itself—including on the front page—rather than being placed at the side of the page. For example, in That's Not My Elephant... (2011), the material patches cover the elephant's ears, trunk, tusks, tail, tummy and feet. Watt has stated that it is important for the materials to vary in tactile nature throughout the book, and she gets inspiration for materials from her daily life. According to the Oxford Companion to Children's Literature, the use of different textures encourages "independent exploration" of the book by the reader.

Watt has said that the formula of the books is "deceptively simple". She says that the success of the books is likely due to the combination of the "tactile and sensory experience" along with a comforting repetition in the text. The pictures in the books are simple and brightly coloured. Watt said that the bold colour choice was intentional and she did not want to use "soft baby pinks and blues". The reader is invited to feel the texture and identify why the picture isn't the subject of the book, prompted by the text "That's not my". For example, in That's Not My Meerkat (2013)..., one two-page spread reads "That's not my meerkat. Its cheeks are too squashy." The final two-page spread reveals the correct subject; in That's Not My Meerkat..., the correct meerkat is revealed by the text: "That's my meerkat! Its tummy is so soft." With this setup, the reader is encouraged to work through the book until they find the right creature, person, or object. In the book Precursor Math Concepts: The Wonder of Mathematical Worlds with Infants and Toddlers (2021), the authors identify That's Not My Puppy... as an example of a book which encourages interaction between the child and adult and facilitates an understanding of "attributes". They write that the discovery of the correct subject at the end of each book amounts to a "happy ending".

Each two-page spread of every That's Not My... book also includes a picture of a mouse. The mouse is sometimes accessorised to match the environment of the subject; in books with underwater subjects, for example, it wears swimming gear including goggles. Watt does not name or gender the mouse, although she had said that many readers believe that the mouse is the one collecting the subjects of the book. Watt usually doesn't imply the gender of any of the subjects of the book where the gender would otherwise be ambiguous. Exceptions include That's Not My Bunny... (2005), , That's Not My Puppy... (1999) and That's Not My Bear... (2003), where the characters on the final pages are identified as male.

== Background and publication history ==
The That's Not My... series is written by Fiona Watt—who is also the editorial director of Usborne Publishing—and illustrated by Rachel Wells. They have collaborated with designer Non Taylor since the inception of the series. Watt's name appears on only some of the That's Not My... books, which Watt says sometimes leads to a misconception that "Fiona Watt" is a pseudonym. Every idea for a That's Not My... book begins in a meeting with Usborne executives, where they decide upon a subject for the book. Watt then comes up with a list of attributes for the subject.

Peter Usborne, the founder of Usborne Publishing, was not initially interested in the idea of the That's Not My... series because he did not like its negative title. He later changed his mind, and the first book in the That's Not My... series—That's Not My Puppy...—was published in 1999. Within the first eleven years of its publication, the book had sold 900,000 copies. In 2019, Usborne held celebration events for the 20th anniversary of That's Not My Puppy... in collaboration with the National Literacy Trust's Read On Nottingham campaign. As of July 2022, the That's Not My... series had 72 books.

== Reception ==
Fiona Watt is one of the bestselling authors of children's books in the United Kingdom, owing to the success of both the That's Not My... series and the Sticker Dolly Dressing series. In 2019, 20 years after the publication of That's Not My Puppy..., the series had reached over 50 titles, sold 6.4 million copies, and made £30.6 million through Nielsen BookScan. (Note: As of 2017, Nielsen BookScan data represents print book sales from around 6,500 retailers) The British book retailer Waterstones writes that the series "has revolutionised baby and toddler books". Public Lending Right data from 2016 to 2017 shows that books by Fiona Watt, including the That's Not My... series, came 14th in the top 20 most borrowed authors from public libraries.

The That's Not My... series and individual books within it have won various literary and children's awards. In 2004 and 2006, That's Not My Penguin... (2003) won the Best Buy award in the Prima Baby Awards. That's Not My Unicorn... (2017), the 50th book in the series, was a Gold Winner in the Made for Mums Awards in 2018. The following year, That's Not My Llama... (2018) won the Gold Award in the Made For Mums Awards. The That's Not My... series won a Gold Award at the Progressive Preschool Awards in 2019.

In the summer of 2014, a That's Not My Meerkat...–themed bench was part of the Books about Town event organised by the National Literacy Trust and held in London. The bench formed part of the City Trail which contained other benches with themes including The Wind in the Willows, Peter Pan and Charles Dickens.
