= Usborne Puzzle Adventure series =

Children's puzzle book series

The Puzzle Adventure book series from Usborne Publishing Ltd was first created in 1984 with the release of Escape from Blood Castle. The first three volumes of the series were originally released as "Usborne Solve It Yourself". Each book contains a vividly illustrated story, with a plot-related puzzle to solve on each double page.

The series's success inspired the creation of three related series: Advanced Puzzle Adventures, Young Puzzle Adventures and Science Puzzle Adventures.

Many of the Puzzle Adventures and Young Puzzle Adventures series have been re-released over the past few years.

== Series ==
=== Puzzle Adventures ===
This is the original series of books, aimed at 8 to 13 year-olds.

No.	Title	Author	Illustrator	Published	ISBN
1	Escape from Blood Castle	Jenny Tyler	Graham Round	1984	9780746080603
2	The Curse of the Lost Idol	Gaby Waters	Graham Round	1986	9780746085851
3	Murder on the Midnight Plane	Gaby Waters	Graham Round	1986	9780860209522
4	The Incredible Dinosaur Expedition	Karen Dolby	Brenda Haw	1987	9780746080627
5	The Intergalactic Bus Trip	Martin Oliver	Brenda Haw; Martin Newton	1987	9780746084366
6	Time Train to Ancient Rome	Gaby Waters	Brenda Haw	1988	9780746080610
7	Danger at Demon's Cove	Karen Dolby	Graham Round	1988	9780746088678
8	Agent Arthur's Jungle Journey	Martin Oliver	Paddy Mounter	1989	9780746084342
9	Agent Arthur on the Stormy Seas	Martin Oliver	Paddy Mounter	1990	9780746084335
10	The Ghost in the Mirror	Karen Dolby	Brenda Haw	1989	9780746088661
11	The Haunted Tower	Susannah Leigh	Brenda Haw	1989	9780746088685
12	Agent Arthur's Arctic Adventure	Martin Oliver	Paddy Mounter	1990	9780746084359
13	The Vanishing Village	Sarah Dixon	Brenda Haw	1990	9780746088319
14	Search for the Sunken City	Martin Oliver	Brenda Haw	1989	9780746088692
15	Journey to the Lost Temple	Susannah Leigh	John Blackman	1989	9780746088265
16	The Pyramid Plot	Justin Somper	Peter Wingham	1991	9780746080597
17	The Invisible Spy	Mark Fowler	Peter Wingham	1993	9780746005101
18	The Emerald Conspiracy	Mark Fowler	Mark Burgess	1993	9780746088302
19	Agent Arthur's Desert Challenge	Martin Oliver	Paddy Mounter	1994	9780746088241
20	Voyage to the Edge of the World	Lesley Sims	Peter Wingham	1994	0746016905
21	Mutiny at Crossbones Bay	Mark Burgess	Mark Burgess	1994	9780746074985
22	Castle of Intrigue	Paul Stewart	Jane Gedye	1994	9780746068922
23	The Dark Dark Knight	Lesley Sims	Peter Wingham	1996	9780746069110
24	Agent Arthur's Island Adventure	Lesley Sims	Paddy Mounter	1998	9780746088258
25	The Crimebusters Investigate	Mark Fowler	Ann Johns	1997	9780746020968
	Agent Arthur's Mountain Mission (announced but never published)				

Some of these books were re-printed in the following omnibuses:

1. The Usborne Book of Puzzle Adventures (ISBN 9780746001554)
  Collecting: The Incredible Dinosaur Expedition, The Intergalactic Bus Trip, Time Train to Ancient Rome.
2. The Second Usborne Book of Puzzle Adventures (ISBN 9780746003107)
  Collecting: Danger at Demon's Cove, Search for the Sunken City, Journey to the Lost Temple.
3. The Third Usborne Book of Puzzle Adventures (ISBN 9780746005125)
  Collecting: The Pyramid Plot, The Emerald Conspiracy, The Invisible Spy.
4. The Fourth Usborne Book of Puzzle Adventures (ISBN 9780746020715)
  Collecting: Voyage to the Edge of the World, Mutiny at Crossbones Bay, Castle of Intrigue.
5. The Fifth Usborne Book of Puzzle Adventures (ISBN 9780746021484)
  Collecting: Agent Arthur's Desert Challenge, The Dark, Dark Knight, The Crimebusters Investigate.
6. The Usborne Book of Solve Your Own Mystery Stories (ISBN 9780746000151)
  Collecting: Escape from Blood Castle, The Curse of the Lost Idol, Murder on the Midnight Plane.
7. The Usborne Big Book of Puzzle Adventures (ISBN 9780746054246)
  Collecting: Danger at Demon's Cove, Incredible Dinosaur Expedition, Ghost in the Mirror, Escape from Blood Castle.
8. Puzzle Adventure Omnibus Vol.1 (ISBN 9780746087336)
  Collecting: Escape from Blood Castle, The Curse of the Lost Idol, Murder on the Midnight Plane, The Incredible Dinosaur Expedition, The Intergalactic Bus Trip, Time Train to Ancient Rome, Danger at Demon's Cove.
9. Puzzle Adventure Omnibus Vol.2 (ISBN 9780746087343)
  Collecting: Agent Arthur's Jungle Journey, Agent Arthur on the Stormy Seas, Agent Arthur's Arctic Adventure, The Haunted Tower, The Vanishing Village, The Ghost in the Mirror, Search for the Sunken City.
10. Puzzle Adventure Omnibus Vol.3 (ISBN 9780746095799)
  Collecting: Mutiny at Crossbones Bay, Agent Arthur's Island Adventure, The Pyramid Plot, Castle of Intrigue, The Emerald Conspiracy, Journey to the Lost Temple, The Dark, Dark Knight.
11. Agent Arthur's Puzzle Adventures (ISBN 9780746001479)
  Collecting: Agent Arthur's Jungle Journey, Agent Arthur on the Stormy Seas, Agent Arthur's Arctic Adventure.
12. Ghost Puzzle Adventures (ISBN 9780746003367)
  Collecting: The Vanishing Village, The Haunted Tower, The Ghost in the Mirror.

=== Advanced Puzzle Adventures ===
This is a more difficult series aimed at older children, currently out of print.

1. Codename Quicksilver
2. Cobra Consignment
3. Mystery on Main Street

The series was reprinted in an omnibus edition.

1. The Usborne Book of Advanced Puzzle Adventures (ISBN 9780746007532)

=== Science Puzzle Adventures ===
The Science Puzzle Adventures series written by Clive Gifford contains science-related puzzles. Each tale pits the wits of Dr. Genius and his resourceful team against the world's most evil criminal superbrains. This series is also currently out of print.

1. The Flask of Doom
2. The Time Warp Virus

=== Young Puzzle Adventures ===
This series uses softer illustrations and is aimed at younger children.

No.	Title	Author	Illustrator	Published	ISBN
	Lucy and the Sea Monster	Karen Dolby	Caroline Jayne Church	1993	9780746088180
	Chocolate Island	Karen Dolby	Caroline Jayne Church	1994	9780746088197
	Uncle Pete the Pirate	Susannah Leigh	Brenda Haw	1994	9780746087442
	Dragon in the Cupboard	Karen Dolby	Caroline Jayne Church	1995	9780746087435
	Molly's Magic Carpet	Emma Fischel	Teri Gower	1995	9780746049211
	Halloween Surprise (previously Spooks' Surprise)	Karen Dolby		1995	9780746087725
	Lucy and the Sea Monster to the Rescue	Karen Dolby	Caroline Jayne Church	1997	9780746088715
	Uncle Pete's Pirate Adventure	Susannah Leigh	Brenda Haw	1997	9780746087459
	Wendy the Witch	Karen Dolby	Brenda Haw	1998	9780746087466
	Land of the Lost Teddies	Emma Fischel	Daniel Howarth	1998	9780746088722

Some of these books were re-printed in the following omnibus:

1. Young Puzzle Adventures (ISBN 9780746060056)
  Collecting: Molly's Magic Carpet, Wendy the Witch, Uncle Pete the Pirate, Lucy and the Sea Monster.

=== Superpuzzles ===
In 1995 Usborne released a 3-in-1 collection of even more advanced puzzles, The Usborne Book of Superpuzzles by Sarah Dixon, Mark Fowler, Radhi Parekh (illustrator) (ISBN 9780746007358, 0746007353). This includes the books Maps and Maze Puzzles, Codes and Ciphers and Logic Puzzles.

== See also ==
- Usborne Spinechillers
