= Billy Lynn's Long Halftime Walk (film) =

2016 film directed by Ang Lee

- Theatrical release poster
- Directed by: Ang Lee
- Screenplay by: Jean-Christophe Castelli
- Based on: Billy Lynn's Long Halftime Walk by Ben Fountain
- Produced by: Marc Platt; Ang Lee; Rhodri Thomas; Stephen Cornwell
- Starring: Joe Alwyn; Kristen Stewart; Chris Tucker; Garrett Hedlund; Vin Diesel; Steve Martin
- Cinematography: John Toll
- Edited by: Tim Squyres
- Music by: Mychael Danna; Jeff Danna
- Production companies: TriStar Pictures; TriStar Productions; Studio 8; LStar Capital; Film4; Bona Film Group; The Ink Factory; Marc Platt Productions
- Distributed by: Sony Pictures Releasing
- Release dates: October 14, 2016 (NYFF); November 11, 2016 (United States & China); February 10, 2017 (United Kingdom)
- Running time: 113 minutes
- Countries: United States; United Kingdom; China
- Language: English
- Budget: $40 million
- Box office: $31 million

Billy Lynn's Long Halftime Walk is a 2016 war drama film directed by Ang Lee and written by Jean-Christophe Castelli, based on the 2012 novel of the same name by Ben Fountain. The film stars Joe Alwyn, Garrett Hedlund, Kristen Stewart, Vin Diesel, Steve Martin, and Chris Tucker. Principal photography began in April 2015 in Georgia. The film is a co-production between the United States, the United Kingdom, and China.

The film had its world premiere at the 54th New York Film Festival on October 14, 2016, and was theatrically released in North America on November 11, 2016, by Sony Pictures Releasing. It had high production costs associated with being the first-ever feature film using an extra-high frame rate of 120 frames per second, further complicated by the 3D format, at 4K UHD resolution. The film received mixed reviews from critics and was a box office bomb, grossing $31 million worldwide against its $40 million budget.

== Plot ==
Billy Lynn, a 19-year-old US Army specialist from Texas, is caught on camera dragging mortally wounded Sergeant Virgil "Shroom" Breem, to safety during an intense firefight in Iraq, on October 23, 2004. This act of courage earns Lynn the Silver Star, and ascends him and his unit, erroneously designated, "Bravo Squad" by the media, to celebrity status. They return to the U.S. for Shroom's funeral, then embark on a publicity tour, culminating at the halftime show of the Dallas Cowboys Thanksgiving home game. Led by Sergeant David Dime, the soldiers of Bravo Squad travel by limousine to the stadium, accompanied by Cowboys' PR representative, Josh, and film producer, Albert Brown, who is securing a film deal for the squad. A flashback reveals that Billy joined the army after destroying the car of his older sister Kathryn's ex-boyfriend, angry at him for leaving her after she was disfigured in a motor vehicle collision. The group is greeted at the stadium by fans who express gratitude for their actions in the Iraq War. During a press conference, Billy notices Cowboys Cheerleader, Faison, smiling at him. They flirt and he tells her it feels weird to be honored for the worst day of his life.

As the game starts, Billy recalls his time in Iraq, where Shroom had offered him karmic philosophical insight and advice during their downtime. Billy then receives a phone call from a psychiatrist, whom Kathryn had engaged to get Billy honorably discharged, and prevent his return to Iraq with the rest of Bravo Squad, who is scheduled to return to duty after the game. The loud music and pyrotechnics of the halftime show traumatize the unstable Sykes, who reacts violently with the stage manager and a security guard.

Billy experiences a flashback to the battle that made them famous. The squad was called in to rescue soldiers pinned down by insurgents at a school. Shroom is shot while advancing from cover, and Billy rushes to save him, firing on the insurgents with his sidearm. Billy drags Shroom into a trench and kills an insurgent at close range, in self-defense. Shroom bleeds to death before Billy can give medical aid. Billy is roused from the flashback, learning the halftime show has been over for a few minutes and he had been frozen in place the whole time. They are ushered off the stage and are diverted from a fight by cheerleaders, led by Faison. Billy takes her name and number on his cell phone, learning that her last name is Zorn, meaning 'anger'.

Billy and Dime meet with the owner of the Cowboys, Norm Oglesby, who is considering investing in Albert's film treatment, but instead of the $100,000 that Albert wanted, offers them $5,500 apiece. Dime angrily rebuffs the offer. Billy rejects Oglesby's confidential aside that the squad's story is no longer theirs, but belongs to the American people. Albert promises Billy that he will find investors, one way or another, and that their story deserves to be told "the right way".

Billy meets with Faison briefly as the squad leaves. He tells her he would abandon the squad to run away with her, but she rejects the idea, and they part with a kiss. Billy reunites with the squad, which is then attacked by security guards, triggering Billy's PTSD, filling his mind with surreal war imagery. The altercation is halted by a warning gunshot. Kathryn arrives to retrieve Billy and confirm his medical discharge, but he makes it clear he is redeploying with his squad, more out of belonging than duty. They part with a tearful hug.

Billy returns to the limo, hallucinating it as a Humvee. Inside, he sees Shroom's familiar icon of Ganesha, and has a philosophical conversation with Shroom. Billy tells Shroom: "I love you", then returns to the reality of the Bravo Squad members in the limo, each of whom responds with "I love you".

== Cast ==
- Joe Alwyn as Billy Lynn
- Garrett Hedlund as David Dime, Bravo Squad's Staff Sgt.
- Kristen Stewart as Kathryn Lynn, Billy's older sister
- Vin Diesel as "Shroom", Bravo Squad, Virgil Jedidiah Breen
- Steve Martin as Norm Oglesby
- Chris Tucker as Albert Brown
- Makenzie Leigh as Faison Zorn, Dallas cheerleader
- Brian "Astro" Bradley as Lodis, Bravo Squad
- Arturo Castro as "Mango" Montoya, Bravo Squad
- Ismael Cruz Córdova as Holliday, Bravo Squad
- Barney Harris as Sykes, Bravo Squad
- Beau Knapp as Robert "Crack" Earl Koch, Bravo Squad
- Mason Lee as Foo, Bravo Squad
- Ben Platt as Josh, Dallas team rep working with Bravo Squad during the football game.
- Tim Blake Nelson as Wayne
- Matthew Barnes as Travis
- Deirdre Lovejoy as Denise Lynn, Billy's Mother
- Bruce McKinnon as Ray Lynn, Billy's Father
- Laura Wheale as Patty Lynn, Billy's Sister
- Elizabeth Chestang as Beyoncé

== Production ==
=== Pre-production ===
Slumdog Millionaire's Oscar-winning screenwriter, Simon Beaufoy, was in 2014 adapting the novel for the screen, produced by Film4 in collaboration with an American production company, The Ink Factory, and Sony Pictures' TriStar film studio division. Also involved in the production are China's Bona Film Group and Studio 8, which is backed by the Chinese conglomerate Fosun International. Ang Lee would direct the film.

The cast—Joe Alwyn, Garrett Hedlund, Kristen Stewart, Vin Diesel, Steve Martin, Beau Knapp, Ben Platt, and Chris Tucker—were announced between February 2015 to May 2015.

Alwyn was cast just two days after he left his drama school, London's Royal Central School of Speech & Drama. After putting himself on tape, he received a call a few days later from the producers to meet Lee in New York City. There—even after the screen test—Lee had some trouble casting him or any other people. He then told Alwyn to head to Georgia for additional screen tests. While the studio was initially skeptical about casting an unknown person, Alwyn was able to convince them after days of such testing. In Atlanta, he did four to five days of testings on set and about a week and a half later, at around 1 a.m. he received a call of acceptance. Alwyn won the titular role because of his "ability to communicate the book's paradox of war with just his facial expressions".

The soldiers onscreen endured weeks of Navy SEAL-style boot camp training since they had to look like real soldiers. They were given guns with special springs that would add a recoil when they shot blanks—a feeling that often left them shaking. "They cannot shoot like Rambo with two guns! A real bullet cannot shoot that bravely", Lee stated.

=== High frame rate ===
Billy Lynn's Long Halftime Walk used an unprecedented shooting and projection frame rate of 120 frames per second in 3D at 4K UHD resolution, which Lee terms the "whole shebang". It is the first feature film ever to be shot in a high frame rate, over twice the previous record (Peter Jackson's 2012 The Hobbit: An Unexpected Journey, shot at 48 fps) and five times the standard speed of 24 fps. Lee undertook such a bold step after reading the book since he wanted the film to be an "immersive" and "realistic" experience of the reality and emotional journey of soldiers.

After working on Life of Pi (2012), Lee wanted to up his use of technology in filmmaking, especially in terms of frame rate, since he thought pursuing a higher frame would help him find answers. Initially, while discussing with Sony Pictures Motion Picture Group chairman and CEO Tom Rothman, Lee wanted to try and shoot the film with at least 60 fps at 2K resolution in 3D as he had experimented with 60 fps before (his first plan was to shoot the Muhammad Ali biopic in 60 fps which he said he will after Billy Lynn). He undertook research and found what Jackson was doing with 48 fps (the highest ever at that time), but did not wish to use such a frame rate after Jackson's The Hobbit: An Unexpected Journey received polarized critical reception. He visited filmmaker Douglas Trumbull who was doing his own 60 fps tests, and so was James Cameron. He made the first test with 120 fps in October 2014, but the decision to shoot with 120 fps was not finalized until just a few weeks before shooting commenced. Billy Lynn was shot with the highest frame rate (HFR) ever until Flamenco (2017) which was shot in 120 fps in 3D, as well as in 192 fps in 2D, but was released in standard 24 fps in 3D and 60 fps in 2D.

=== Filming ===
Principal photography began in the second week of April 2015, in Locust Grove, Georgia. Some scenes were shot on location at the Georgia National Cemetery in Canton, Georgia. Filming also took place in Atlanta and in Morocco and in downtown Atlanta on April 17, 2015. Shooting took place for 49 days.

Due to the complexity involved in shooting at a very high frame rate, Lee could not afford to do many takes even for a single scene. Every shot was difficult and at the same time precious. He would rehearse every scene beforehand and would conduct regular morning meetings with the key crew members to highlight things they needed to be alert on.

Shooting close-up shots in 3D with such high resolution meant the cast could not wear make-up and could not deliver less-than-authentic performances. Since no make-up was allowed, make-up artist Luisa Abel spent months of preparation on their skin tones. According to Lee: "[Abel] found this silicone-based makeup because we found that it can see through skin". Throughout filming, the production team had to rethink everything, including different approaches to lighting as the camera needed extra lights due to the higher frame rates. To film the war sequences, Lee strayed from the usual practice of moving cameras to create confusion. Instead, he did the opposite by shooting mostly from the protagonist's point-of-view to capture the realism and to look more authentic.

=== Post-production ===
Lee's longtime collaborator Tim Squyres, who worked with the director on numerous films including Crouching Tiger, Hidden Dragon (2000), Brokeback Mountain (2005), and Life of Pi (2012), edited the film and took over a year to complete it. It was completed just a day before its world premiere in New York City on October 14.

To accommodate the film's wide release, various additional versions of the film were created. They include 120 fps in 2D and 60 fps in 3D as well as today's current standard of 24 fps. The film also received a Dolby Cinema release, with two high dynamic range versions that can accommodate 2D and 3D, with up to 120 fps in 4K resolution.

In order to present the film at the 54th New York Film Festival, a special installation was required, including two Christie Mirage 4K HDR laser projectors (a first for any theaters) with 7thSense's Media Server for playback, using festival sponsor RealD's 3D system and 42-foot-by-19-foot Ultimate Screen, the company's latest screen technology. The installation is expected to display 28 foot-lamberts (a measurement of light), per eye, according to RealD chief innovation officer Pete Lude.

== Release ==
Due to the complexity of the film's outstanding high frame rate and the cost of installing equipment capable of projecting the film in its intended format, only five theaters globally were equipped to show it at its highest resolution and maximum frame rate: two in the United States (one at a theater in New York City's AMC Lincoln Square where the film had its world premiere and the other in Los Angeles's the ArcLight Hollywood), and one theater each in Taipei, Beijing, and Shanghai.

The film had its world premiere at the 54th New York Film Festival on October 14, 2016. It was not screened at Alice Tully Hall because the theater is too large to get the correct distance between the dual laser projectors and the screen. Instead, a roughly 300-seat theater at the AMC Lincoln Square on the Upper West Side was chosen. But even at this theater, a few adjustments had to be made: the first three rows were off limits because they would not provide an acceptable 3D viewing experience, and a new screen, the RealD Ultimate Screen, was installed in the theater (expressly for this premiere and the forthcoming run of the film). Variety reported that the reaction from that first screening was decidedly mixed, with comments ranging from "it was flat" to "nothing happened".

In the United States it had a limited release on November 11, 2016, before opening wide on November 18, 2016.

=== Home media ===
On February 14, 2017, Billy Lynn's Long Halftime Walk was released on DVD, Blu-ray, and in an Ultra HD combo pack which contains the Blu-ray, Blu-ray 3D, and 4K UHD versions of the film. The 4K UHD version presents the film at 60 frames per second in 2D.

== Reception ==
=== Box office ===
Billy Lynn's Long Halftime Walk grossed $2 million in the United States and Canada and $29 million in other countries for a worldwide total of $31 million, against a production budget of $40 million.

==== North America ====
In the United States and Canada, the film opened to a sold out limited release on November 11, 2016, playing at two theaters, AMC Lincoln Square in New York City and ArcLight Hollywood's Cinerama Dome in Los Angeles, and earned $114,129 in its opening weekend (an average of $57,065 per theater). The aforesaid two theaters are the only two locations in the United States that are equipped to present the film in its special format, with ticket prices at both locations running $20 or higher. Its per-theater average is the third-best of the year, just behind Moonlight ($100,519) and Don't Think Twice ($92,835).

The following weekend, the film expanded wide to 1,176 theaters, where it was expected to gross $3–5 million. It made $352,475 on its opening day and just $901,026 over the weekend, finishing outside the top ten at number fourteen. It was the 25th-worst-ever debut for a film opening on more than 1,000 screens. The film was considered another box office misfire for TriStar Pictures following 2015's The Walk and, according to Deadline Hollywood, it wasn't the lack of 3D 4K HDR projectors available that factored into the film's poor box office performance, but rather that the story itself didn't resonate with critics or audiences. In its second weekend of wide release, the film grossed just $210,000 (still from 1,176 theaters) for a drop of 76.6%, the 21st-biggest second-weekend drop of all time.

Scott Mendelson of Forbes argued that a bag of mixed to negative reviews hindered the box office potential of the film. Unlike tentpole films, which aren't as affected by critic reviews and fan reception, adult-skewing drama films like Billy Lynn heavily depend on reviews which could either help or hinder the box office fate of a film. In this case, the bad reviews took a toll on the film. He also pointed out that the complex release format—which is the main focus of the whole film—failed to deliver its intended desired effect, which manifested in its poor box office performance. The Guardian cited different causes, saying that the Iraq war settings—which don't usually resonate to American audiences—and the war genre itself as being tough-selling subject matter. War films in the United States are generally sold as action films, but Billy Lynn on the other hand is a drama piece. The film falls in line with previous poor showings of Iraq War films, after Green Zone (2010), Body of Lies (2008), Rendition (2007) and Stop-Loss (2008).

==== Outside North America ====
Internationally, the film earned $13.2 million on its opening weekend (November 11–13) from nine markets, a bulk of which came from China. In China, it delivered a $11.7 million debut, placing at number two behind holdover Doctor Strange. The film, which has Chinese finance (via Bona Film Group and Fosun International), but is considered as a revenue sharing import, had over 60,000 screenings on Friday, and by Sunday, was down to 45,000. It earned $11.5 million and with paid previews finished the weekend with $11.7 million, according to data from Ent Group. While it registered the highest percentage of showtimes on Friday owing to Lee's popularity in China, the attendance dwindled and deteriorated from its second day onward due to mixed word of mouth as general audiences were unable to relate to its central character. It has made around $20 million there. The film also opened in Taiwan, Lee's domicile. The film continued the majority of its international release mainly in January 2017 in Brazil, Mexico and Spain; France, Germany, Italy, the UK and Japan in February, followed by Korea and Russia in March. Whereas in France, the movie didn't attract a wide audience (only 11,000 people), but Cahiers du cinéma listed it as number ten on their annual top films of 2017.

=== Critical response ===
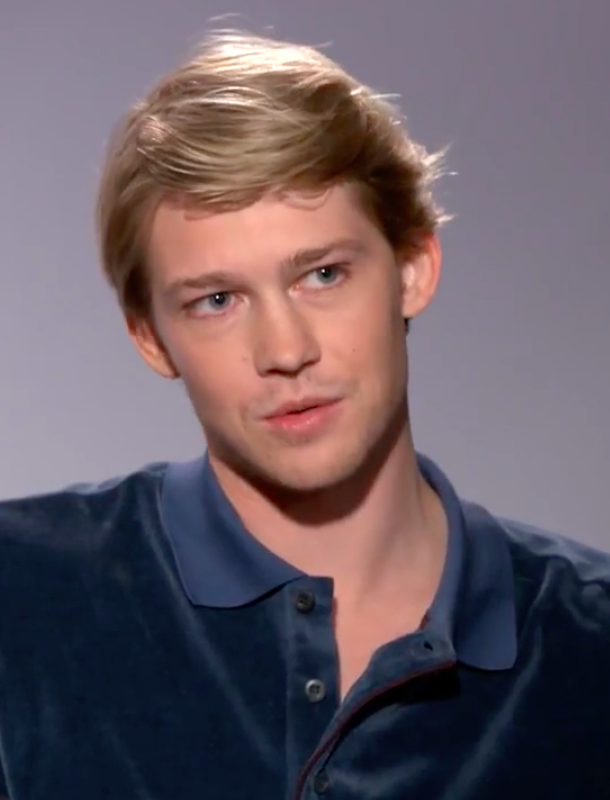
Joe Alwyn's performance received positive comments, even though the film garnered unfavorable reviews overall.

On website Rotten Tomatoes, the film has an approval rating of 44% based on 161 reviews. The site's critical consensus reads: "Billy Lynn's Long Halftime Walk has noble goals, but lacks a strong enough screenplay to achieve them—and its visual innovations are often merely distracting". On Metacritic, the film has a weighted average score of 53 out of 100, based on 42 critics, indicating "mixed or average reviews".

Owen Gleiberman of Variety praised the film, calling it "a highly original, heartfelt, and engrossing story. And part of the power of it lies in the way that those two things are connected". David Rooney of The Hollywood Reporter described the film as "an absorbing character study" but criticized some of the technological aspects saying that it didn't justify "its much-vaunted technological advances". The New York Times's A. O. Scott reviewed the film and said that "not exactly a rare war-movie notion, but Billy Lynn’s Long Halftime Walk explores it with gentleness rather than sentimental bombast". He also noted that the imagery is "somewhat paradoxically, so hyperreal that their artificiality becomes more pronounced". He criticized the frame rate for "falling into an uncanny valley between cinema and virtual reality". Godfrey Cheshire of RogerEbert.com rated the film two stars out of four, stating that "the contrast between this grisly reality and the way it’s framed as jingoistic spectacle makes a satiric point that’s a bit too obvious to be effective". He also criticized the characters and dialogue. Jeffrey M. Anderson of Common Sense Media rated the film two stars out of five, saying that the characters "don't know how to interact with the soldiers. And so every interaction, whether good or bad, is left with a question mark". He also noted that the movie's frame rate "looks extra-fake and is quite distracting". Peter Bradshaw of The Guardian rated the film two stars out of five, saying that it "has neither topical immediacy nor any real historical perspective and, burdened with pedantic and predictable flashbacks, it finally leads nowhere interesting at all". He also calls the film "dull, conservative [that] plays it sentimental and safe – and it comes pretty close to suggesting that the best thing for soldiers with PTSD is just to man up and get right back into action". Despite this, he praised Joe Alwyn but criticized Kristen Stewart.

The high frame rate used in the film drew some criticism, especially the decision to use it in a drama film. David Rooney of The Hollywood Reporter said that "the technical innovations took me out of the drama just as often as they pulled me in". Dan Callahan for TheWrap felt that some of the characters were "so super-clear that they look like a cut-out with scissors from a glossy magazine" and said that "the extra-clarity 3D in this Lee movie often looks weirdly like something shot on videotape in the 1980s". Much like The Hobbit: An Unexpected Journey, which was shot at 48 frames-per-second or twice the typical speed, Billy Lynn's Long Halftime Walk received a polarized reception from critics, with detractors saying the process created an unpleasing video look.

=== Accolades ===
List of awards and nominations
Award	Date of ceremony	Category	Recipient(s)	Result	Ref.
Hollywood Film Awards	November 6, 2016	Hollywood Producer Award	Marc Platt (also for La La Land and The Girl on the Train)	Won	
Hollywood Film Awards	November 6, 2016	Hollywood Film Composer Award	Mychael Danna (also for Storks)	Won	
Satellite Awards	February 19, 2017	Best Cinematography	John Toll	Nominated	
Satellite Awards	February 19, 2017	Best Film Editing	Tim Squyres	Nominated	
Satellite Awards	February 19, 2017	Best Sound	Billy Lynn's Long Halftime Walk	Nominated	
Satellite Awards	February 19, 2017	Best Visual Effects	Billy Lynn's Long Halftime Walk	Nominated	
