= Six-Dinner Sid =

1990 children's picture book by Inga Moore

- Author: Inga Moore
- Illustrator: Inga Moore
- Language: English
- Genre: Children's picture book
- Published: 1990 (Simon & Schuster)
- Publication place: England
- Media type: Print (hardback)
- Pages: 40 (unpaginated)
- ISBN: 9780750003049
- OCLC: 22311048
- Followed by: Six Dinner Sid: A Highland Adventure

Six-Dinner Sid is a 1990 children's picture book by Inga Moore. It is about a sleek black cat called Sid who manages to reside at six homes at the same time, receiving all the benefits, including six daily meals. After being caught out, Sid goes to a different neighbourhood to receive the same pampering from households that don't mind.

== Reception ==
A review in Kirkus Reviews of Six-Dinner Sid wrote "Moore makes the most of her tall tale in amusing illustrations detailing Sid's several characters, then ends with a satisfying twist..." Booklist found that "Children will empathize with the actions and attitudes of this charmingly greedy feline."

Six-Dinner Sid has also been reviewed by The Canberra Times, Publishers Weekly, School Library Journal, Horn Book Guides, Five to Seven, and Magpies.

It has been included on favourite cat book lists, and has been mentioned regarding cat legal cases.

It won the 1990 Nestlé Smarties Book Prize 0–5 Years.

Moore wrote a sequel involving Sid, Six Dinner Sid: A Highland Adventure, which was published in 2010.

== CD release ==
In 2005 a CD of Six-Dinner Sid was released and was narrated by British actor Peter Sallis.
