= The Risk Agent =

2012 novel by Ridley Pearson

- First edition
- Author: Ridley Pearson
- Language: English
- Genre: Suspense, Thriller
- Publisher: G.P. Putnam’s Sons
- Publication date: July 19, 2012
- Publication place: United States
- Media type: Print (hardcover and paperback), e-book, audiobook
- Pages: 432
- ISBN: 978-0399158834

The Risk Agent is a 2012 thriller novel by Ridley Pearson. The story follows former military contractor John Knox and veteran Chinese intelligence officer-turned-forensic accountant Grace Chu investigating the disappearance of Lu Hao and Clete Danner in Shanghai, despite private investigations being illegal. The book was published on June 19, 2012.

== Synopsis ==
To take care of his autistic brother, John Knox partners with Grace Chu to investigate the kidnapping of Knox’s old friend Clete Danner and Lu Hao, the brother of Chu’s boyfriend.

== Reception ==
On June 30, 2012, Jeff Ayers, for the Associated Press, said that Pearson "has created an intense and realistic thriller. The atmosphere and culture of China draws the reader into a new world."

== Potential film adaptation ==
On July 25, 2012, Vince Vaughn acquired the film rights to star in and produce the film adaptation with Universal Pictures distributing and Michael Lerner writing the script. In 2015, Max Adams wrote the script.
