= Hans Joachim Störig =

Hans Joachim Störig (25 July 1915 – 10 September 2012) was a German non-fiction author, translator, publisher (Fischer Verlag) and lexicographer, best known for his Kleine Weltgeschichte der Philosophie.

== Biography ==
Störig was born in Quenstedt and studied history, philosophy, sociology and law at various universities, attaining PhD's in both law and philosophy. He has taught at the Ludwig-Maximilians-Universität München.

His most successful book, Kleine Weltgeschichte der Philosophie (A Small World History of Philosophy), was originally published in 1950. It has since been translated into six languages and has been revised and updated several times. It is still in print.

Störig is also known for his lexicography works, such as Der große Störig. Knaurs großes Wörterbuch der deutschen Sprache.

He wrote also Abenteuer Sprache:Ein Streifzug durch die Sprachen der Erde (The Language Adventure: A Journey through the Languages of the Earth ), a book aimed at a general audience. The book describes the history and development of languages of the world, the specificities and commonalities of languages, ancient language writing and decoding, the development and spread of language families and individual languages, as well as the development and history of auxiliary languages like Esperanto and Interlingua.
