= Stephen Dau =

American-Belgian writer

- Born: Greensburg, Pennsylvania, U.S.
- Education: University of Pittsburgh; Johns Hopkins University; Bennington College (MFA)
- Occupation: Writer
- Writing career
- Notable work: The Book of Jonas (2012)
- Website: www.stephendau.com

Stephen Dau is an American-Belgian writer.

His debut novel is The Book of Jonas published in 2012, which was a finalist for the First Novelist Award. It was named one of the best books of the year by Kirkus Reviews, Booklist and The Wall Street Journal. Originally from Western Pennsylvania (Pittsburgh), he lives in Brussels, Belgium. His work has appeared in Ploughshares, The Pittsburgh Post-Gazette, The North Atlantic Review, McSweeney's, and on MSNBC.com.

== Early life and education ==
Dau was born in Greensburg, Pennsylvania. He graduated from the University of Pittsburgh. He attended the M.A. in Writing program at Johns Hopkins University before receiving an MFA in Writing from Bennington College.

Dau worked for 10 years in the post-Yugoslav Wars reconstruction of Eastern Europe and Bosnia. He lives in Brussels, Belgium.

== Novels ==
- The Book of Jonas Penguin Group USA
