= Captain Cat (book) =

Children's picture book by Inga Moore

- Author: Inga Moore
- Illustrator: Inga Moore
- Language: English
- Genre: Children's picture book
- Published: 2012 (Walker Books)
- Publication place: England
- Media type: Print (hardback)
- Pages: 48 (unpaginated)
- ISBN: 9781406337303
- OCLC: 798409836

Captain Cat is a 2012 children's picture book by Inga Moore. It is about a sea captain, Captain Cat, who trades goods in exchange for cats, and his ensuing adventures.

== Publication history ==
- 2013, USA, Candlewick Press ISBN 978-07-6366-151-9
- 2012, England, Walker Books ISBN 978-14-0633-730-3

== Reception ==
Kirkus Reviews wrote "Though it’s on the long side, Moore’s tale combines traditional themes and spritely illustrations to create a satisfying, offbeat adventure." A reviewer stated in The Bulletin of the Center for Children's Books "This would be a cozy classroom readaloud selection or a comfy bedtime story; having a couple of kitties on hand would, of course, enrich the experience.",

Captain Cat has also been reviewed by BookPage, Magpies, The New York Foundling, The Guardian, The New York Times, Publishers Weekly, The Oklahoman The Morning Call, Booklist, School Library Journal, and Horn Book Guides.
