= The Book of Jonas =

2012 novel

- First edition
- Author: Stephen Dau
- Language: English
- Genre: Novel
- Publisher: Blue Rider Press (Penguin Group)
- Publication date: March 15, 2012
- Publication place: United States
- Media type: Print (hardback)
- Pages: 256 pp
- ISBN: 978-0-399-15845-2

The Book of Jonas is a 2012 debut literary novel by American writer Stephen Dau. The book was published in English on March 15, 2012 by Blue Rider Press, and in French as Le Livre de Jonas by Éditions Gallimard. The book takes its name from the Book of Jonah of the Hebrew Bible and features themes of war and its effect on others.

== Synopsis ==
The story is set sometime after the September 11 attacks in an unnamed Middle Eastern country, where Younis, a 15-year-old local boy survives an errant U.S. military operation. An international relief agency relocates him to Pittsburgh, Pennsylvania where he's raised by a foster family with the new name of "Jonas" and where he struggles to assimilate. After savagely beating another student who had been bullying him, he is mandated to visit a councilor, who attempts to help him confront his traumatic past. He receives a scholarship and enrolls at the University of Pittsburgh, where he meets and falls in love with Shakri, a beautiful pre-med student from India. He also begins hanging around with a hard-partying group of exchange students and drinking to the point of blackout. Eventually, he is put in contact with Rose, the mother of a soldier, Christopher, who participated in the attack that killed his family, and who has been missing ever since. Jonas tries to help Rose come to terms with the loss of her son by describing for her the last hours of his life. But he's awash in conflicting emotions and changes parts of the story, "adding and subtracting, substituting what should have been said for what he fails to remember accurately." As these memories surface, Jonas become more and more unstable, drinking to the point of blackout and acting abusively toward Shakri, in scenes that are reminiscence of returning soldiers' experiences with post-traumatic stress disorder. Eventually, Jonas honors the memory of Chris by mailing to Rose a journal that Chris kept while he was deployed. When the package arrives, she is out in her garden planting a new tree ("thinking that she is being overly optimistic, planting a tree at her age") which represents life after years of mourning.

== Development ==
The book is written in short, succinct sections from multiple points of view, alternating between Jonas in the present, Jonas in his memories from his home country, Rose and her memories or her son, and Chris, through reproduced entries and in his journal, which becomes, over the course of the story, the eponymous name of the book. In an interview with the French journal Mediapart, Dau stated that while this fragmented style does add to the sense of emotional fragmentation Jonas experiences in the book, the reason he wrote like this initially was that he "was pretty good at writing beginnings, and pretty good at writing endings...but not very good at writing middles."

Dau chose to write about teenagers involved in war because he wanted "needed a protagonist who was both old enough to understand what was going on and young enough to be largely blameless for it." He has also stated that he decided to leave the home country of refugee Jonas unnamed because "leaving Jonas's home country vague lends the story a certain universality. By happening nowhere specific, it could have happened anywhere."

== Reception ==
Critical reception for The Book of Jonas has been overwhelmingly positive. It was a semifinalist for the 2012 First Novelist Award, and it was named one of the ten best books of 2012 by the Wall Street Journal, which called it "the year's finest novel addressing America's 21st-century wars." It was named one of the best books of the year by Kirkus Reviews, which called it "a literary tour de force." It was a Barnes & Noble Discover Great New Writers Selection. Many reviewers highlighted the "snippets" style of the book as both a highlight and, while a few said it was an initial annoyance. A reviewer for the Wall Street Journal commented that Dau's writing was occasionally flat, but that he also "beautifully addresses a need to emotionally engage with a war that has been going on for 10 years but that so often feels remote and unreal".
