= Horacio Vázquez-Rial =

Horacio Vázquez-Rial (20 March 1947 – 6 September 2012) was an Argentine-born writer and translator who lived in Spain from 1968, mostly in Barcelona. He was nominated for the Nadal Prize in 1987 for Historia del triste, and in March 1989 he was a finalist for the fifth edition of the Plaza y Janes Prize for La Reina de oros. His only work available in English is Triste's History. He died in Madrid, aged 65.
