= Ma Jian (writer) =

Chinese-born British writer (born 1953)

- 马建
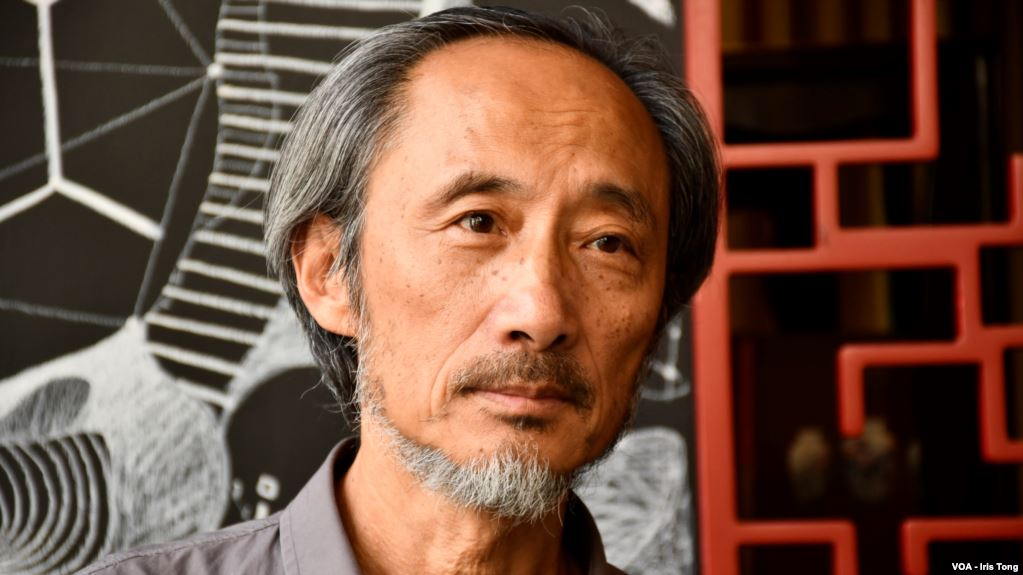
- Ma Jian in November 2018
- Born: 18 August 1953 (age 73); Qingdao, Shandong, China
- Occupation: Writer
- Writing career
- Genres: Memoir, novel, short story
- Notable works: Red Dust: A Path Through China; Beijing Coma
- Notable awards: Thomas Cook Travel Book Award; 2002

Chinese name
- Traditional Chinese: 馬建
- Simplified Chinese: 马建
Transcriptions
Standard Mandarin
- Hanyu Pinyin: Mǎ Jiàn
- Wade–Giles: Ma Chien

Ma Jian (born 18 August 1953) is a Chinese-born British writer.

== Early life ==
Ma was born in Qingdao, a city in Shandong Province on China's Yellow Sea coast, on 18 August 1953. As a child, he was the pupil of a painter who had been persecuted as a Rightist. After his school education was cut short by the Cultural Revolution, he studied by himself, copying out a Chinese dictionary word by word. At fifteen, he joined a propaganda arts troupe, and was later assigned a job as a watchmender's apprentice. For a few years he worked in a petrochemical plant near Beijing, then in 1979, moved to the capital and became a photojournalist for a magazine published by the All China Federation of Trade Unions. During this time, he joined the 'underground' No Name art group, the Yuanmingyuan poetry group, and the April photographers' group. He held clandestine exhibitions of his paintings in his one-room shack in Nanxiao Lane, which became a meeting point for dissident artists and writers of Beijing.

In 1983, his paintings were denounced during the Anti-Spiritual Pollution Campaign, and he was placed in detention. After his release, he resigned from his job and set off on a three-year journey through China, selling his paintings and stories as he went.

== Writing ==
When Ma returned to Beijing in 1986, he wrote Stick Out Your Tongue, a novella inspired by his travels through Tibet. Its publication in the official journal People's Literature in February 1987 coincided with a nationwide crackdown on the arts, and the government publicly denounced the work as an example of bourgeois liberalism. All copies of the journal were confiscated and destroyed, and a blanket ban was placed on the future publications of Ma Jian's books. The China called it a "vulgar and obscene book that defames the image of our Tibetan compatriots." The stories are set in Tibet. Their most remarked-upon feature is that traditional Tibetan culture is not idealised, but rather depicted as harsh and often inhuman; one reviewer noted that the "stories sketch multi-generational incest, routine sexual abuse and ritual rape". It was later translated into English in 2006.

Ma Jian then moved to Hong Kong, where speech freedoms were much higher. He wrote Bardo, a novel about two doomed lovers who are reincarnated through Chinese history, and The Nine Crossroads, about a group of sent-down youth who are sent to a remote mountain inhabited by a primitive tribe.

In 1989, Ma Jian returned to Beijing and took part in the democracy protests. After the Tiananmen massacre, he remained in the capital and wrote The Noodle Maker, a dark political satire. For the next few years, he travelled back and forth between Hong Kong and China, editing, briefly, the Hong Kong arts magazine, Wen Yi Bao, and setting up the New Era publishing company and the literary journal Trends, which published essays and novels banned in China.

After the Handover of Hong Kong to China in 1997, Ma Jian moved to Germany to take up a post teaching Chinese literature at Ruhr University, and to work on Beijing Coma, a novel about the Tiananmen massacre and the decade of political repression and economic growth that followed it.

In 1999, he moved to London and wrote Red Dust, a fictionalised account of his journey through China in the 1980s, which won the 2002 Thomas Cook Travel Book Award. He returned to China regularly, and resumed work on Beijing Coma, which was finally published in 2008 and won the 2009 Index on Censorship T.R. Fyvel Book Award and the 2010 Athens Prize for Literature. The novel tells the story of the Tiananmen Square protests of 1989 from the point of view of the fictional Dai Wei, a participant in the events left in a coma by the violent end of the protests. The comatose narrator functions as a metaphor for the ability to remember and the inability to act. It has received critical acclaim, with Tom Deveson of The Times describing it as "epic in scope but intimate in feeling … magnificent" and the Financial Times calling it "an epic yet intimate work that deserves to be recognised and to endure as the great Tienanmen novel."

In 2008–2009, he travelled extensively through the remote interior of China to research The Dark Road, a novel that explores the One Child Policy, published by Chatto & Windus and Penguin in 2013.

In 2001, he collaborated in founding the Independent Chinese PEN Centre, a branch of PEN International, became its board member in 2003–2005 and 2009–2011, a member of its Freedom to Write Committee since 2003, and director of its Press & Translation Committee since 2011.

In April 2012, while attending the London Book Fair, Ma used red paint to smear a cross over his face and a copy of his banned book Beijing Coma and called his Chinese publisher a "mouthpiece of the Chinese communist party" after being "manhandled" while attempting to present the book to the director of the General Administration of Press and Publication and the director of National Copyright Administration, Liu Binjie, at the fair.

In November 2018, Ma was a guest at the Hong Kong International Literary Festival. Tai Kwun, the venue for the events, initially cancelled his two talks, because it did not want to "become a platform to promote the political interests of any individual", but subsequently reversed course. The incident sparked public outcry in Hong Kong. Many related this with the recent Victor Mallet visa controversy and the cancellation of Badiucao's exhibition, complaining that China was covertly silencing critics in the autonomous territory and curbing her autonomy.

Ma Jian's work has been translated into 26 languages, including English, French, Spanish, German, Swedish, Norwegian, Catalan, Japanese, Dutch, Hebrew, Romanian, Turkish, Greek, Polish, Korean, Italian and Portuguese.

In 2024 he appeared in Jean-François Lesage's documentary film Among Mountains and Streams (Parmi les montagnes et les ruisseaux), discussing his art and activism with Chinese dissident painter Meng Huang.

== Personal life ==
He lives in London with his partner and translator, Flora Drew, and their four children.

Ma Jian is a vocal critic of China's Communist government. His works explore themes and subjects that are taboo in China. He has continually called for greater freedom of expression and the release of jailed writers and other political prisoners. As a result, his books have been banned in China for the last 25 years, and since the summer of 2011, he has been denied entry into China.

== Awards and honours ==
- 2002 Thomas Cook Travel Book Award
- 2009 China Free Culture Prize
- 2009 Index on Censorship TR Fyvel Book Award
- 2010 Athens Prize for Literature

== List of works ==
Books of short stories and novellas

- Stick Out Your Tongue (亮出你的舌苔或空空荡荡) (1987) banned in China, English version: Chatto & Windus and Farrar, Straus & Giroux (2006)
- A Dog's Life (你拉狗屎) (1987)
- The Lament (怨碑) (1996)

Novels

- Bardo (思惑) (1989)
- The Noodle Maker (拉面者) (1991), English version: Chatto & Windus (2004) and Farrar, Straus & Giroux (2005)
- The Nine Crossroads (九条叉路) (1993)
- Red Dust (非法流浪) (2003), English version: Chatto & Windus and Pantheon Books (2001)
- Beijing Coma (肉之土) (2009) banned in China, English version: Chatto & Windus and Farrar, Straus and Giroux (2008)
- The Dark Road (阴之道), Yun chi dao (2012), Taipei: Yun Chen Publishing. English version: Chatto & Windus and Penguin (2013)
- China Dream (2018) English version translated by Flora Drew: Chatto & Windus, ISBN 9781784742492

Other collections

- Ma Jian's Road (马建之路), travel notes and photographs (1987)
- Life Companion (人生伴侣), collection of poems and essays (1996)
- Intimately Related (发生关系), collection of essays (1997)
