= Liu Binjie =

Chinese politician

Liu Binjie (Chinese: 柳斌杰; born September 1948) is a Chinese politician. He currently serves as the Chair of the Education, Science, Culture and Public Health Committee of the National People's Congress. He was most well-known for serving as the director of the General Administration of Press and Publication and the director of National Copyright Administration between 2007 and 2013. He also served as the deputy head and director of executive office of the national working group of "Eliminating pornography and illegal publications".

== Biography ==
Born in Changwu, Shaanxi Province, Liu started working in April 1968. He joined Chinese Communist Party (CCP) in August 1971. He graduated from Institute of Foreign Studies at Beijing Normal University, majoring western economics, and from department of philosophy in Graduate School of Chinese Academy of Social Sciences with a master's degree in Marxist epistemology.

In 1995, he became a member of CCP committee, governor assistant and secretary general in Sichuan people's government. In October 1999, he was appointed as a standing committee member of Sichuan Provincial Committee of the CCP, secretary general of the provincial government and the head of provincial propaganda department. In April 2002, he was promoted to vice president and CCP committee member of General Administration of Press and Publication of PRC. In November 2004, he was additionally appointed as vice head and director of executive office of national working group of Eliminating pornography and illegal publications. He became Chinese Communist Party Deputy Committee Secretary in General Administration of Press and Publication in November 2006, He was promoted to Chinese Communist Party Committee Secretary and president of General Administration of Press and Publication, and president of National Copyright Administration in April 2007.

Liu was a member of 17th Central Committee of the Chinese Communist Party. When he left office as chief of the General Administration for Press and Publication, the department he once headed was merged into the State Administration of Press, Publication, Radio, Film and Television (SARFT). Liu then joined the Science, Education, and Technology Committee of the National People's Congress.

== Controversy ==
In April 2012, exiled Chinese writer Ma Jian, with a cross made of red paint over his face, called Chinese publishers a "mouthpiece of the Chinese communist party" after being "manhandled" while attempting to present a copy of his banned book Beijing Coma to Liu Binjie at the London Book Fair.
