= The Dragonsitter =

2012 novella by Josh Lacey

- Author: Josh Lacey
- Illustrator: Garry Parsons
- Language: English
- Series: The Dragonsitter
- Subject: Children's literature, Chapter book
- Published: 2012 (Andersen Press)
- Publication place: England
- Media type: Print (hardback, paperback)
- Pages: 52
- ISBN: 9781849394192
- OCLC: 774640217
- Followed by: The Dragonsitter Takes Off

The Dragonsitter is a 2012 children novella by Josh Lacey. It is about a young boy, Edward, and the problems he and his family experience while looking after a pet dragon for a week.

== Publication history ==
- 2012, England, Andersen Press ISBN 9781849394192
- 2013, Der Drachensitter, Anu Stohner (translator), Germany, Sauerländer ISBN 9783411812592
- 2015, USA, Little, Brown and Company ISBN 9780316298964

== Reception ==
Booktrust wrote, in a review of The Dragonsitter, "From catastrophe to worse, this is the madcap and giggle-inducing story of how to tackle a pet with a difference, with energetic drawings to match", and The Daily Telegraph described it as "short, sharp and funny."

The Dragonsitter has also been reviewed by Kirkus Reviews, Horn Book Guide Reviews, School Library Journal, School Library Connection, Publishers Weekly, and School Librarian.

It was shortlisted for the 2012 Roald Dahl Funny Prize: The Funniest Book for Children Aged Seven to Fourteen."
