= Beijing Coma =

2008 novel by Ma Jian

- Author: Ma Jian
- Translator: Flora Drew
- Language: Chinese
- Publisher: Farrar, Straus and Giroux
- Publication place: United States
- English publication date: May 27, 2008
- Media type: Print
- Pages: 592 ppg
- ISBN: 0374110174

Beijing Coma (Chinese: 北京植物人) is a 2008 novel by Ma Jian. It was translated from Chinese by Flora Drew. The Chinese government has since banned the book. Ma has stated that he wrote the book "to reclaim history from a totalitarian government whose role is to erase it" and named the novel Beijing Coma in reference to this. Beijing Coma was listed as one of The New York Times "100 Notable Books of 2008".

== Synopsis ==
The book follows the character of Dai Wei, a man who awakens from a coma to discover that ten years have passed since he was shot in Tiananmen Square on June 4, 1989. The book's narrative switches between Dai Wei's time as a non-responsive coma patient to his life before his shooting.

== Reception ==
Critical reception for the book was positive, with Tash Aw calling it "a landmark".

Pankaj Mishra compared Beijing Coma with the work of writers such as Milan Kundera, Josef Škvorecký and Ivan Klíma. Michiko Kakutani praised the novel's translation while stating that the book "is desperately in need of editing".

== Controversy ==
In April 2012 Ma protested the choice of China as the guest of honor at the London Book Fair. Ma used red paint to smear a cross over his face and attempted to present a copy of Beijing Coma to Liu Binjie, but was stopped by security. Ma called his Chinese publisher a "mouthpiece of the Chinese communist party" and claimed that he had been manhandled while trying to give Liu his book.
