= Inga Moore =

Anglo-Australian author and illustrator (born 1945)

- Born: 1945; Sussex, England
- Occupations: Children's author and illustrator
- Writing career
- Genre: Children's literature
- Notable works: Illustrations for The Wind in the Willows and The Secret Garden

Inga Moore (born 1945) is an Anglo-Australian author and illustrator of books for children.

== Life ==
Born in Sussex, England, at the age of eight Moore emigrated with her family to Australia, where she went to school in Adelaide. She has said that at the age of fourteen her favourite book was James Boswell’s The Journal of a Tour to the Hebrides.

After leaving school, Moore took a variety of jobs. Raymond Briggs’s book Father Christmas (1973) inspired her to want to illustrate books, and she began to look for work as an illustrator. An early work, Aktil’s Big Swim (1980), tells the story of a Dover mouse who decides to swim the English Channel, not understanding how wide it is. In the early 1980s, Moore returned to live in England, settling in Hampstead, while still working on picture books. Her Six-Dinner Sid (1990), an illustrated book for children about a cat, took six months to complete and won the Nestlé Smarties Book Prize in the under-five category, but during the recession of the early 1990s her flat was repossessed. This had a happy outcome, as Moore then found an apartment in a large but decaying Palladian house in a Gloucestershire village, with good light in a room she planned to use as a studio. Not far from the River Windrush, the countryside around the house inspired the illustrations for Moore’s edition of Kenneth Grahame’s The Wind in the Willows, which went on to sell more than a million copies. Her editions of other children’s classics include Frances Hodgson Burnett’s The Secret Garden and Oscar Wilde’s The Canterville Ghost.

As of 2010, Moore was still living and working in Gloucestershire. Following her version of The Wind in the Willows, she is reported to be working on a sequel.

== Books by Inga Moore ==
- Aktil's Big Swim (Oxford University Press, 1980)
- Aktil's Bicycle Ride (Oxford University Press, 1981) (ISBN 0 19554319 X.)
- Aktil's Rescue (Oxford University Press, 1982)
- The Vegetable Thieves (Andersen Press Ltd, 1983; Viking Press, 1984, ISBN 9780670743803)
- A Big Day for Little Jack (1984)
- The Truffle Hunter (Andersen Press Ltd, 1987)
- Fifty Red Night-caps (Walker, 1988, ISBN 9780744517835)
- Rose and the Nightingale (London: Andersen Press, 1988)
- The Sorcerer’s Apprentice (Prentice Hall, 1989)
- Six-Dinner Sid (Simon & Schuster, 1990, ISBN 9780750003049)
- Oh, Little Jack (1992)
- The Little Apple Tree (1994)
- Six Dinner Sid: A Highland Adventure (2010)
- A House in the Woods (Candlewick Press, 2011)
- Captain Cat (Walker Books, 2012, ISBN 9781406337303)
- Moose's Book Bus (Candlewick Press, 2021)

== Illustrations for works by other authors ==
- Prayers for Children, by Caroline Royds (Doubleday, 1989)
- Anne of Green Gables, by LM Montgomery (Henry Holth & Co, 1994)
- The Wind in the Willows, by Kenneth Grahame (Walker Books, 1999, ISBN 9780744567090)
- The Reluctant Dragon, by Kenneth Grahame (2004)
- Dragons and Other Beasts, by Kenneth Grahame and E. Nesbit (2006)
- The Secret Garden, by Frances Hodgson Burnett (Walker Books, 2008, ISBN 9781406318500)
- The Canterville Ghost, by Oscar Wilde
