= Dear Blue Sky =

2012 novel by Mary Sullivan

- First Edition
- Author: Mary Sullivan
- Cover artist: Kristin Smith, Shutterstock
- Language: English
- Genre: Children's Fiction
- Set in: The United States, 2006-2007
- Publisher: Puffin Books, Nancy Paulsen Books
- Publication date: 2012
- Publication place: United States
- Media type: Print
- Pages: 248
- ISBN: 978-0-14-242667-8

Dear Blue Sky is a 2012 American novel written by Mary Sullivan, the receiver of a Rona Jaffe Foundation Writers' Award and a St. Botolph Club Foundation Award. The story is split into short chapters, and told in the perspective of Cassie, an American girl whose brother volunteered to fight in the Iraq War. This book is recommended for ages 10 and up.

Dear Blue Sky has been nominated for the Dolly Gray Children's Literature Award.

== Plot ==
The story begins the Saturday before Cassie's brother, Sef, leaves for Iraq.

After a party, Sef leaves the following day. The family falls apart: Cassie is lost in memories, their mother is severely frightened, Cassie's sister Van is drinking alcohol, and Cassie's little brother, Jack, misses Sef greatly.

During a school project, Cassie coincidentally sees the blog of a 13-year-old Iraq girl nicknamed Blue Sky. Blue Sky describes life in Iraq during the war from her perspective. She explains the environment and the casualties and expresses her feelings and opinions. Cassie begins to question her own thoughts about the war. Cassie and Blue Sky become pen pals and write to each other via email, gradually learning more about life in another part of the world.

One day, Jack gets beaten up by the neighbors' son, Ben. Ben threatens that if Jack says anything, Sef will not come home. Jack stops speaking to everyone.

Cassie learns to be the courageous "Supergirl" Blue Sky is. Unfortunately, Blue Sky has to leave home and move to another country: because her father works for the U.S as a translator, Blue Sky's whole family is in danger.

Soon, the next time Sef calls, Jack starts talking again. However, Sef explains to Cassie that he has to extend his term in Iraq in the next email.

The story ends with Van, Jack, and Cassie playing happily at the beach. The fate of Sef is unknown.

== Reception ==
Critical reception was mostly positive. Dear Blue Sky has received reviews from the Horn Book, Publishers Weekly, Booklist, Kirkus Reviews, Great Kid Books, Linsworth Publishing Company Reviews, Bookpage, and The New York Times reviews. Publishers Weekly wrote that "author Sullivan (Ship Sooner) effectively sketches Cassie's growing confusion as she learns more and cultivates a more balanced view of the war while making new friends and resolving her own conflicts. Sullivan doesn't sugarcoat how hard things are for Cassie's family on the home front, yet captures the resilience and hope that keep them going." Two reviews from the Horn Book stated "Sullivan gets it right". Kirkus commented "Cassie's first-person narration effectively captures the messiness of life in a loving family when outside-world events intervene." Linsworth Publishing Company Reviews recommended this book to "readers who are interested in family dynamics and who understand what it's like to send a loved one to war". The reviewer at Great Kid Books said she is "definitely looking forward to sharing Dear Blue Sky with my students this fall". Bookpage praised "Award-winning author Mary Sullivan has written a novel for young readers that is both timely and timeless". Booklist praised that Sullivan's fully dimensional characters brought de

pth to the story, but also complained about "the lack of resolution".

The novel has also been reviewed by various authors, including Vanessa Diffenbaugh, David Mamet, Leah Hager Cohen, Julianna Baggott, Laura Harrington, and Danica Novgorodoff. David Mamet, a Pulitzer Prize-winning playwright, praised "Ms Sullivan's book is bold and lovingly written. Writing for those who are both young and adult, she has come down on the gratifying side of the balance." Leah Cohen stated that "Mary Sullivan takes complex subjects—war, loyalty, bullying, friendship—and honors their complexity in lucid, fast-paced, effortless-seeming prose." Julianna Baggott said "Dear Blue Sky is a poignantly realistic look at the effects of war".
