= Bollywood Striptease =

2012 novel by Neeta Shah

- Author: Neeta Shah
- Language: English
- Genre: Fiction
- Publisher: Rupa & Co.
- Publication date: 03/01/2012
- Publication place: India
- Media type: Paperback
- Pages: 208
- ISBN: 978-81-291-1949-0

Bollywood Striptease is a 2012 novel by Neeta Shah. The book is published by Rupa & Co. According to the author Neeta Shah, the novel is a "factual, but fictionalised" description of the Hindi film industry.

== Plot ==
The central character of the novel is Nikki, an attractive chartered accountant who aspires to become a Bollywood actress. Nikki quits her stable job to pursue her ambition but is met with hostility by her family and other people because of her unconventional decision. Her only source of encouragement is her two good friends, Shonali and Karan. In the film industry, she meets unexpected situations including rejections at auditions, "casting couch" offers, and a difficult relationship.

== Reviews ==
Lasyapriya Sundaram of CNN-IBN has described the novel as "a light and frothy take on the big bad world of Hindi cinema". According to Sundaram, "More than being an intriguing narrative the book is closer to being a handbook on 'how to' navigate your way in a world which comes with its share of the good, bad and the ugly." However, the CNN-IBN review criticized the book for failing to portray the inside of Bollywood accurately.

Blessy Chettiar in her review on Daily News and Analysis asserted the author used "flowery language" in the novel to depict Nikki's daily experiences. The review claimed the language used is "not necessarily enlightening". She concluded, "Not insightful even by a long shot, Bollywood Striptease is only a tease, telling and re-telling what you already know." Actress Riya Sen, who launched the book, claimed the novel exposes the inside of Bollywood, saying, "This book has everything and I think what she has written is true."
