= Neeta Shah =

Indian producer and author

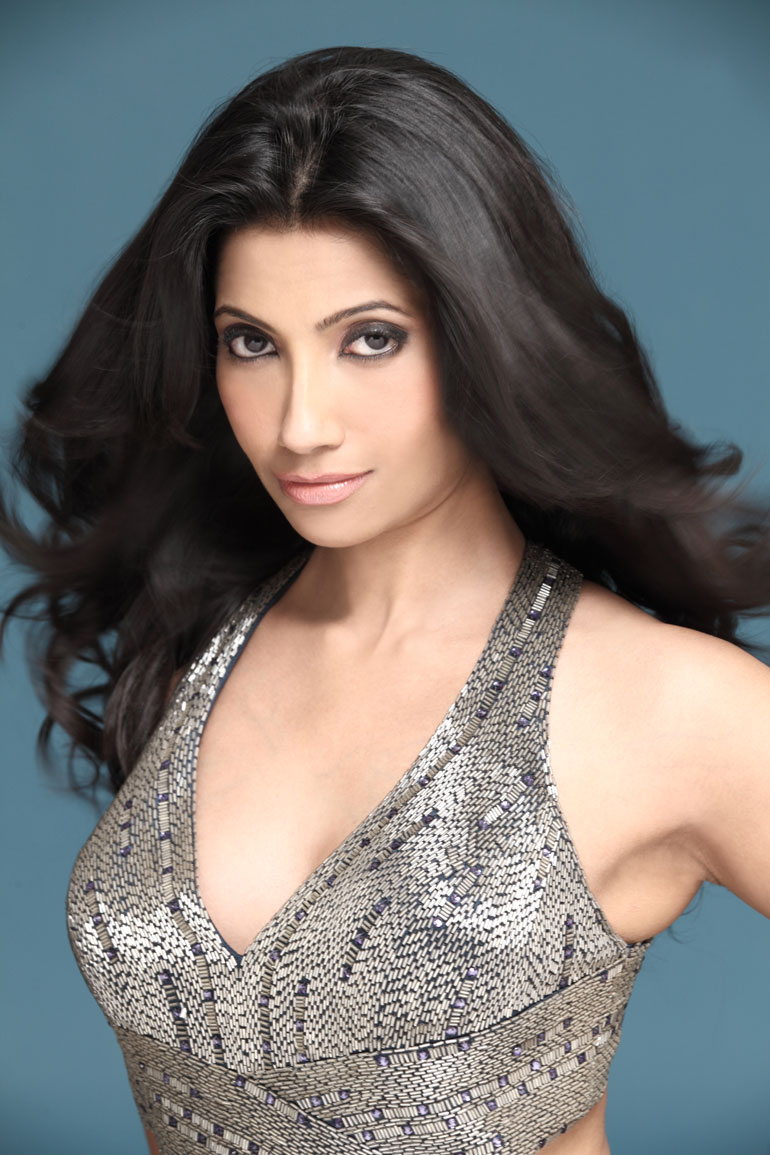
- Born: 2 January 1981 (age 45); Mumbai, India
- Education: H.R. College, Institute Of Chartered Accountants Of India
- Occupations: Producer, writer
- Years active: 2012-present
- Notable work: Bollywood Striptease, The Stranger In Me

Neeta Shah (born 2 Jan 1981) is an Indian producer and author.

== Biography ==
Neeta Shah, a chartered accountant, is an Indian Producer and an Author.

Prior to becoming a Producer, Neeta owned a successful marketing company - Pulp Fiction Entertainment, from 2013 that marketed feature films and brand associations.

Her maiden novel Bollywood Striptease was published by Rupa Publications in February 2012. Her second book, The Stranger In Me was co-written by Aditi Mediratta and released in May 2019 by Om Books International.

Shah produced a feature film Noorani Chehra starring Nawazuddin Siddiqui and a web series Gamerlog starring Darsheel Safari and Anjali Sivaraman for Amazon MX.

She co-owns a production company RDP Pulp Fiction Entertainment with Abhinay Deo, that is producing multiple feature films and web-series.

== Filmography ==
Year	Title	Producer	Marketing	Notes
2013	Grand Masti		X	
2015	Revolver Rani		X	
2015	The Xpose		X	
2015	Heartless			
2015	Roar: Tigers of the Sundarbans		X	
2015	Koyelaanchal		X	
2015	Kya Dilli Kya Lahore		X	
2015	Kaun Kitne Paani Mein		X	
2016	Jai Gangaajal		X	
2016	Saat Uchakkey		X	
2016	30 Minutes		X	
2017	Laali Ki Shaadi Mein Laaddoo Deewana		X	
2017	Babumoshai Bandookbaaz		X	
2017	Daddy		X	
2017	Coffee with D		X	
2017	Haseena Parkar		X	
2017	Dear Maya		X	
2018	Bhaiaji Superhit		X	
2018	Hotel Milan		X	
2018	Saheb, Biwi Aur Gangster 3		X	
2019	Fraud Saiyaan		X	
2021	Chehre		X	
2022	Noorani Chehra	X		Feature Film
2022	Gamer Log	X		Web-Series
