= Usborne Spinechillers =

Usborne Spinechillers is a series of children's mystery puzzle books published by Usborne Publishing.

Titles in the series include:

1. The Midnight Ghosts (1991)
2. House of Shadows (1993)
3. Ghost Train to Nowhere
4. The Haunting of Dungeon Creek (1995)
5. Stage Fright (1995)
6. Nightmare at Mystery Mansion (ISBN 0746020899)
7. Destination Fear (1996)
8. Mindmaster (Clive Gifford, 1997, ISBN 0746024703)
9. Faces at the Window
10. Clock of Doom (1996)

== Collections ==
- The Usborne Book of Spinechillers (1993, ISBN 0746007183)
  - The Midnight Ghosts
  - Ghost Train to Nowhere
  - House of Shadows
- The Second Usborne Book of Spinechillers (1995, ISBN 0746020694)
  - The Haunting of Dungeon Creek
  - Stage Fright
  - Nightmare at Mystery Mansion
