= Paige Ackerson-Kiely =

American poet (born 1975)

- Born: October 1975 (age 50); Biddeford, Maine, U.S.
- Education: Beloit College; Marmara University; Birzeit University; University of New Mexico (BA)
- Occupation: Poet

Paige Ackerson-Kiely was born in October 1975 in Biddeford, Maine. She is a modern poet. She is also the director of the MFA in Creative Writing program at Sarah Lawrence College, and works for the Poetry Journal Handsome. She lives in Washington Heights, New York City.

== Education ==
Paige Ackerson-Kiely received a BA in Asian Studies from the University of New Mexico in Albuquerque. Prior to this, she attended Beloit College in Beloit, Wisconsin, Marmara University in Istanbul, and Birzeit University in Birzeit, Palestine.

== Author ==
Ackerson-Kiely is the author of In No One's Land (Ahsahta Press, 2007), a book of poetry that was selected for the 2006 Sawtooth Poetry Prize by D. A. Powell. This book also won the award for Poets & Writers Exchange. Her second full-length collection of poetry, My Love is a Dead Arctic Explorer (Ahsahta Press, 2012) began as a response to Admiral Richard E. Byrd's memoir, Alone. In February, 2019, Penguin/Random House published her third volume of poetry, Dolefully, A Rampart Stands. About this collection, Publishers Weekly wrote that the "language here is stark and devastating."

Ackerson-Kiely has produced a limited edition art folio, This Landscape (Argos Books 2010), and prose chapbook Book About a Candle Burning in a Shed (above/ground 2011). She has been published in Pleiades, Bellingham Review, Ninth Letter, jubilat, LIT, and The Laurel Review. In 2009 she was one of the featured authors in the all-poetry edition of The Laurel Review, an edition that was dedicated to the memory of poet Reginald Shepherd. She is currently a co-editor for Black Ocean's poetry journal Handsome, Director of the Graduate Writing Program at Sarah Lawrence College, and faculty member at the New England College MFA program.
