= Fiona Watt (author) =

British children's author

Fiona Watt is a British children's author who has written more than 100 books. She is best known for her That's Not My... series. From 2000 to 2009, she sold 2,431,376 copies in the UK, with a value of £14.1 million.

Watt has a bachelor's degree from Exeter University.
