= Ben Fountain =

American fiction writer

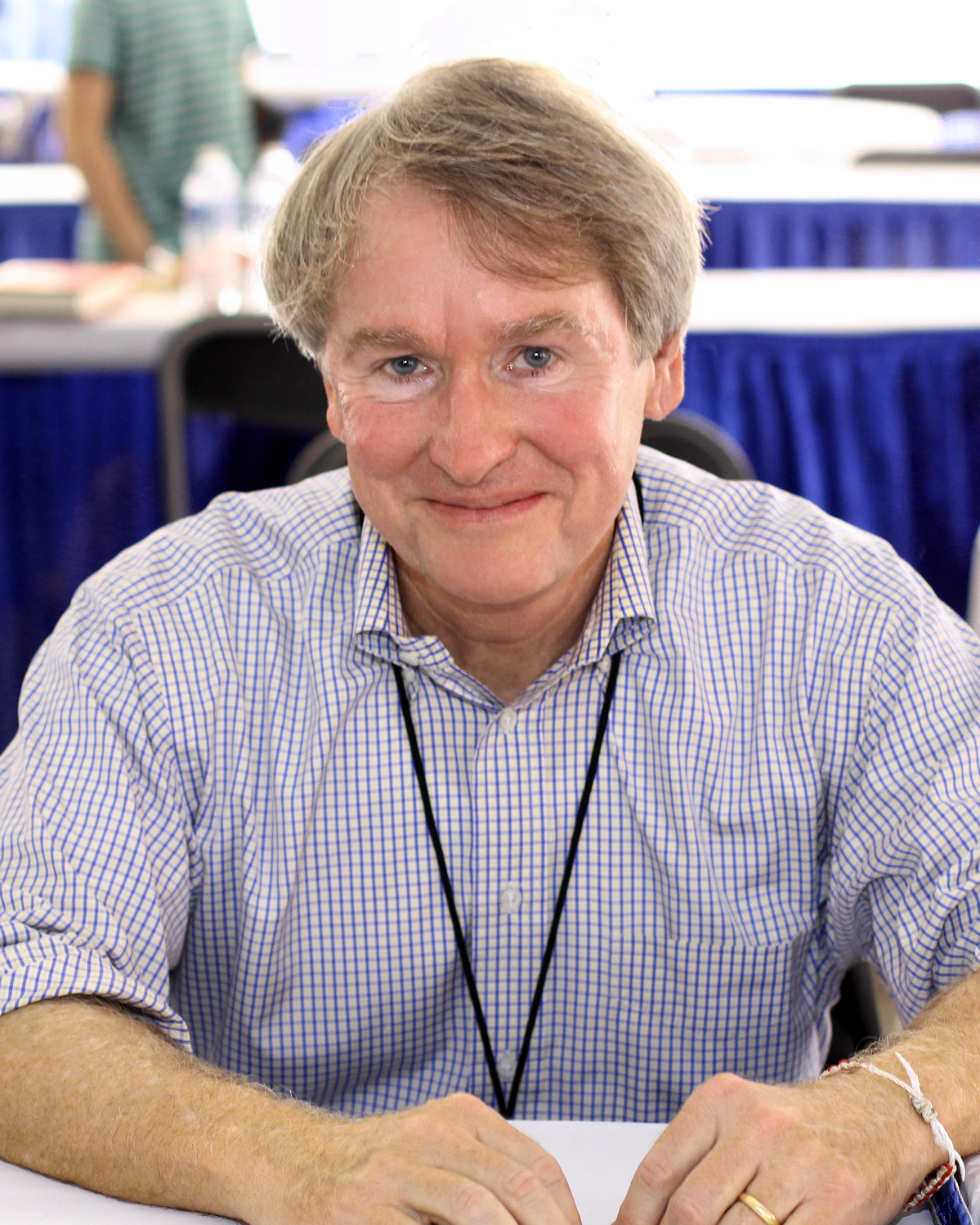
- Fountain at the 2018 Texas Book Festival
- Born: 1958 (age 67–68); Chapel Hill, North Carolina, U.S.
- Education: University of North Carolina at Chapel Hill (BA); Duke University School of Law (JD)
- Occupation: Writer
- Spouse: Sharon Monahan (m. 1985)

Ben Fountain (born 1958) is an American writer currently living in New Bern, North Carolina. He has won many awards including a PEN/Hemingway Award for Brief Encounters with Che Guevara: Stories (2007) and the National Book Critics Circle Award for fiction for his debut novel Billy Lynn's Long Halftime Walk (2012).

== Early life ==
Fountain was born in Chapel Hill, North Carolina. He grew up in Elizabeth City, a tobacco town in eastern North Carolina. His family moved to Cary, near Raleigh, when he was 13. Fountain earned a B.A. in English from the University of North Carolina at Chapel Hill in 1980, and a J.D. degree from the Duke University School of Law in 1983. After a brief stint practicing real estate law at Akin Gump in Dallas, Fountain quit law in 1988 to become a full-time fiction writer.

== Writing career ==
While collecting articles about things he was interested in, Fountain was riveted by Haiti, regarding it "like a laboratory, almost ... Everything that’s gone on in the last five hundred years—colonialism, race, power, politics, ecological disasters — it’s all there in very concentrated form. And also I just felt, viscerally, pretty comfortable there." Speaking little French, let alone Haitian Creole, he went for his first trip abroad there in 1991 and at least thirty more times. From this came four of the best regarded stories in his 2006 breakthrough collection of short stories: Brief Encounters With Che Guevara when Fountain was forty-eight. He has won numerous awards and inclusion of his work in New Stories from the South: The Year's Best (2006).

Fountain's debut novel, Billy Lynn's Long Halftime Walk, was released in early May 2012. Ang Lee directed a film adaptation, Billy Lynn's Long Halftime Walk, which began filming in 2015 and was released in November 2016.

== Personal life ==
Fountain married Sharon (née Monahan), an attorney, in 1985; they met when both were students at Duke University School of Law. They have two children.

== Awards and honors ==
- 2002 Texas Institute of Letters Short Story Award
- 2003 Texas Institute of Letters Short Story Award
- 2005 Texas Institute of Letters Short Story Award
- 2004 Pushcart Prize
- 2005 O. Henry Award
- 2006 Barnes & Noble Discover Award for Fiction
- 2007 O. Henry Award
- 2007 PEN/Hemingway Award for Brief Encounters with Che Guevara
- 2007 Whiting Award
- 2012 Center for Fiction First Novel Prize, Billy Lynn's Long Halftime Walk
- 2012 Goodreads Choice Awards (fiction) finalist for Billy Lynn's Long Halftime Walk
- 2012 Los Angeles Times Book Prize (fiction), Billy Lynn's Long Halftime Walk
- 2012 National Book Award (fiction), finalist, Billy Lynn's Long Halftime Walk
- 2012 National Book Critics Circle Award (fiction), Billy Lynn's Long Halftime Walk
- 2012 Specsavers National Book Awards (International Author of the Year) shortlist for Billy Lynn's Long Halftime Walk
- 2013 Chautauqua Prize, shortlist, Billy Lynn's Long Halftime Walk
- 2013 Dayton Literary Peace Prize (fiction), runner-up, Billy Lynn's Long Halftime Walk

== Bibliography ==
=== Books ===
- Brief Encounters with Che Guevara (Ecco, 2006, ISBN 9780060885588)
- Billy Lynn's Long Halftime Walk (Ecco, 2012, ISBN 9780060885595)
- Beautiful Country Burn Again (Ecco, 2018, ISBN 9780062688842)
- Devil Makes Three (Flatiron, 2023)
- Rasputin Swims the Potomac: A Novel (Flatiron, 2026)

=== Short fiction ===
- "Near-Extinct Birds of the Central Cordillera ", Zoetrope: All-Story, Spring 2002
- "The Good Ones Are Already Taken", The Barcelona Review
