= London Map Fair =

Annual arts festival

Coordinates: 51.5013°N 0.1754°W

The London Map Fair, established in 1980, is a two-day annual event traditionally held in June at the Royal Geographical Society in Kensington, London.

It brings together around 40 map dealers as exhibitors, and attracts hundreds of other dealers, curators, and collectors from around the world. According to Ken Jennings, as of 2011, it was "Europe's largest event for buying and selling antique maps". It is noted for being the largest specialist fair of its kind. Exhibitors offer a range of atlases, travel books, globes, nautical charts, town plans, topographical prints, and related ephemera.

The fair also organizes lectures by cartographic experts, both map sellers and academics. Guest speakers have included Peter Barber, former Head of Map Collections at the British Library; Laurence Worms, former President of the Antiquarian Booksellers’ Association; writer and broadcaster Nicholas Crane; author Alan Ereira; and artist Adam Dant.

The fair also organizes talks on map collecting for beginners, held throughout the weekend.

The current organizers of the fair are Tim Bryars and Massimo de Martini.
