= Billy Lynn's Long Halftime Walk =

2012 novel by Ben Fountain

- First edition
- Author: Ben Fountain
- Genre: Novel
- Publisher: Ecco Press
- Publication date: May 2012
- Publication place: United States
- Media type: Print (hardcover and paperback)
- Pages: 307
- ISBN: 978-0060885595

Billy Lynn's Long Halftime Walk is a satirical war novel written by Ben Fountain, which was published in early May 2012 by Ecco Press, a publishing imprint of HarperCollins. The novel chronicles the experience of a group of Iraq War veterans who are hailed as heroes and sent on a victory tour following their engagement in an intense firefight that happened to be caught on camera. Set during a single day, the story primarily focuses on Specialist Billy Lynn's perspective as he struggles to reconnect with his family and come to grips with the huge disconnect between the realities of the war at home and the war overseas as Bravo Squad is sent to participate in the Dallas Cowboys' Thanksgiving halftime show. The novel's primary themes include fraternity, the commercialization of war, and what it really means to support the war when the real costs are barely felt by the majority of US citizens at home.

A sharp satire, Billy Lynn's Long Halftime Walk is Fountain's first novel. It received highly positive reviews from critics and won several awards, including the National Book Critics Circle Award for Fiction and the Flaherty-Dunnan First Novel Prize. It was also a finalist for the 2012 National Book Award. The novel was especially praised for its dialogue and "pitch-perfect ear for American talk." A film adaptation of the novel directed by Ang Lee was released in November 2016.

== Plot ==
19-year-old Specialist Billy Lynn is part of an eight-man unit, Bravo Squad, fighting in Iraq. After key moments of a brief but intense fight anointed as "the Battle of Al-Ansakar Canal" are filmed by an embedded Fox News crew, Lynn and seven other surviving members return to the US hailed as war heroes. Lynn is awarded the Silver Star.

The squad is sent on a two-week nationwide Victory Tour by the Bush administration to evoke support for the war. The culmination of the Victory Tour is Bravo Squad's invitation to attend the Dallas Cowboys' Thanksgiving game as the team's guests and to make an appearance during the halftime show with Destiny's Child. The squad is also accompanied by Albert Ratner, a veteran Hollywood producer who has attached himself to Bravo Squad and is trying to help them sell the rights of their story to a movie studio. Albert hopes to secure Cowboys owner Norman Oglesby as a major investor for the film project, and while Norman is interested in the project he reduces Albert's initial offer for Bravo Squad's story from $100,000 apiece to $5,500 each.

It is later revealed that following the Victory Tour, the government has not relieved the men of their duty for their achievements and they are to return to Iraq. A long flashback section of the book relays an earlier visit Lynn spends with his family in small-town Texas where his sister encourages him to consider abandoning the army and refusing to return to fight in Iraq.

As the book progresses, Lynn begins to express disenchantment with the treatment of supposed war heroes from American citizens who have seen nothing of war. He engages in a fight, has revelations about his family and how he was raised, reconsiders past decisions, and reminisces about dead comrades, including Shroom, the sergeant who died in Billy's arms in Iraq. As Lynn's time in the US and at the Cowboys' stadium wraps to a close, he experiences a lusty and intimate romance with a cheerleader on the team. However, she becomes shocked and noticeably shaken when he informs her that he is to return to duty despite his squad's accomplishments. She reassures him she wants to stay in contact and that they will make it work, but he is not so optimistic: he figures that people do not want to wait years for a soldier to return home. As he leaves, he finds comfort in his comrades and friends, who accompany him as they leave Texas Stadium.

== Film adaptation ==
A movie based on the novel premiered at the New York Film Festival on October 14, 2016, and was theatrically released in the United States on November 11, 2016. Directed by Ang Lee, the film starred Joe Alwyn in the title role.
