= Michael Lemonick =

American journalist (born 1953)

Michael D. Lemonick
- Born: 13 October 1953 (age 72)
- Education: Princeton High School
- Alma mater: Harvard University; Columbia University Graduate School of Journalism
- Employer: Scientific American
- Spouse: Eileen Hohmuth-Lemonick
- Father: Aaron Lemonick

Michael D. Lemonick (/ˈlɛmənɪk/ LEM-ə-nik, born 13 October 1953) is an opinion editor at Scientific American, a former senior staff writer at Climate Central and a former senior science writer at Time.

He has also written for Discover, Yale Environment 360, Scientific American, and other publications, and has written several popular-science books.

== Life ==
The son of Princeton University physics professor and administrator Aaron Lemonick and a native of Princeton, New Jersey, Lemonick graduated from Princeton High School, then earned degrees at Harvard University and the Columbia University Graduate School of Journalism.

He teaches communications and journalism at Princeton University and resides in Princeton with his wife Eileen Hohmuth-Lemonick, a photographer and photography instructor at Princeton Day School.

== Bibliography ==
=== Books ===
- The Light at the Edge of the Universe: Leading Cosmologists on the Brink of a Scientific Revolution (May 11, 1993)
- Other Worlds: The Search for Life in the Universe (May 14, 1998)
- Echo of the Big Bang (2003); 2nd edition (Apr 24, 2005)
- The Georgian Star: How William and Caroline Herschel Revolutionized Our Understanding of the Cosmos (Great Discoveries) (Dec 14, 2009)
- Mirror Earth: The Search for Our Planet's Twin (Oct 29, 2013); 2012 ebook
- The Light at the Edge of the Universe: Dispatches from the Front Lines of Cosmology (Princeton Legacy Library) (July 14, 2014)
- The Perpetual Now: A Story of Amnesia, Memory, and Love (Feb 7, 2017)

=== Essays and reporting ===
- Lemonick, Michael (Sep 2013). "Save our satellites". Big Idea. Discover. 34 (7): 22, 24.
- Lemonick, Michael D., "Cosmic Nothing: Huge empty patches of the universe could help solve some of the greatest mysteries in the cosmos", Scientific American, vol. 330, no. 1 (January 2024), pp. 20–27.
