= Usborne Publishing =

British publisher of children books

- Status: Active
- Founded: 5 December 1973; 52 years ago
- Founder: Peter Usborne
- Country of origin: United Kingdom
- Headquarters location: London
- Distribution: HarperCollins (UK trade, US trade, Australia, New Zealand, Canada, India); Penguin Random House (South Africa); Educational Development Corporation (USA direct sales)
- Fiction genres: Children's literature
- No. of employees: 210 (2014)
- Official website: usborne.com

Usborne Publishing, often called Usborne Books, is a British publisher of children's books. Founded by Peter Usborne in 1973, Usborne Publishing uses an in-house team of writers, editors, and designers. In the United States, Usborne books are sold and distributed to the traditional retail trade through HarperCollins.

Among its other sales chanels are multi-level marketing operations Usborne Books at Home founded in 1981 in Britain, and PaperPie in the United States.

== Quicklinks ==
Quicklinks were first introduced in 2000 as a way to incorporate the internet into modern reading habits. Peter Usborne has been quoted in the trade magazine The Bookseller as saying: "I initially thought that the internet would kill non-fiction, because teachers would tell children to use the internet to help with homework. But if you key in 'castles' [on a search engine], you get 900,000 possible websites. The internet is an inadequate resource for children."

== See also ==
- List of UK children's book publishers
- Usborne Puzzle Adventure series
- Usborne Spinechillers
