= Glen Cook bibliography =

List of works by American speculative fiction author Glen Cook.

== The Black Company ==
=== Books of the North ===
1. The Black Company (May 1984)
2. Shadows Linger (October 1984)
3. The White Rose (April 1985)

==== Related ====
- The Silver Spike (September 1989). Takes place concurrently with Shadow Games
- Port of Shadows (September 2018). An interquel set between The Black Company and Shadows Linger, intended to be read after Soldiers Live
- The Long Run: A Black Company Collection (May 2027). This volume collects nine stories set between Shadows Linger and The White Rose.

=== Books of the South ===
1. Shadow Games (June 1989)
2. Dreams of Steel (April 1990)

=== Books of the Glittering Stone ===
1. Bleak Seasons (April 1996)
2. She Is the Darkness (September 1997)
3. Water Sleeps (March 1999)
4. Soldiers Live (July 2000)

=== A Pitiless Rain ===
1. Lies Weeping (November 2025)
2. They Cry (November 2026)
3. Summer Grass (TBA)
4. Darkness Knows (TBA)

=== Omnibuses ===
==== Science Fiction Book Club hardcover omnibus editions ====
1. Annals of the Black Company (collects The Black Company, Shadows Linger, and The White Rose)
2. The Black Company Goes South (collects The Silver Spike, Shadow Games, and Dreams of Steel)
3. The Black Company: Glittering Stone I (collects Bleak Seasons and She Is the Darkness)
4. The Black Company: Glittering Stone II (collects Water Sleeps and Soldiers Live)

==== Tor softcover omnibus editions ====
1. The Chronicles of The Black Company (collects The Black Company, Shadows Linger, and The White Rose) (November 2007)
2. The Books of the South (collects Shadow Games, Dreams of Steel, and The Silver Spike) (June 2008)
3. The Return of The Black Company (collects Bleak Seasons, and She Is the Darkness) (September 2009)
4. The Many Deaths of the Black Company (collects Water Sleeps and Soldiers Live) (January 2010)

=== Short fiction ===
==== On The Long Run story arc ====
- "Shaggy Dog Bridge"—first appeared in Fearsome Journeys: The New Solaris Book of Fantasy edited by Jonathan Strahan, published by Solaris (2013); reprinted in The Best of Glen Cook
- "Bone Eaters"—first appeared in Operation Arcana edited by John Joseph Adams, published by Baen (2015); reprinted in The Best of Glen Cook
- "Chasing Midnight"—first appeared in The Best of Glen Cook: 18 Stories from the Author of The Black Company and The Dread Empire, published by Night Shade Books (2019)
- "Cranky Bitch"—appeared in Songs of Valor edited by Chris Kennedy & Rob Howell, published by New Mythology Press (2021)
- "Leta of the Thousand Sorrows"—appeared in Keen Edge of Valor, edited by Chris Kennedy & Rob Howell, published by New Mythology Press (2022)
- "Wet Dream Fish Story"—appeared in Bonds of Valor edited by Rob Howell, published by New Mythology Press (2023)
- "Those Who Went Before"—appeared in Paladins of Valor edited by Rob Howell, published by New Mythology Press (2024)

==== Excerpts from novels published separately ====
- "Raker"—appeared in The Magazine of Fantasy & Science Fiction (August 1982). A trimmed and edited version of this story would become chapter 3 of 1984's The Black Company.
- "Tides Elba"—appeared in Swords & Dark Magic edited by Jonathan Strahan and Lou Anders, published by Eos (2010). This became chapter 3 of 2018's Port of Shadows.
- "Smelling Danger"—appeared in the Subterranean Press anthology, Tales of Dark Fantasy 2, edited by William Schafer (2011). This became chapter 6 of Port of Shadows.
- "Bone Candy"—appeared in Shattered Shields edited by Jennifer Brozek and Bryan Thomas Schmidt, published by Baen (2014). This became chapter 9 of Port of Shadows.

== Garrett P.I. ==
The fantasy and mystery series features Garrett, a freelance private investigator in a world where magic works all too well, and where humans co-exist uneasily with numerous other intelligent species and halfbreeds.

1. Sweet Silver Blues (1987)
2. Bitter Gold Hearts (1988)
3. Cold Copper Tears (1988)
4. Old Tin Sorrows (1989)
5. Dread Brass Shadows (1990)
6. Red Iron Nights (1991)
7. Deadly Quicksilver Lies (1994)
8. Petty Pewter Gods (1995)
9. Faded Steel Heat (1999)
10. Angry Lead Skies (2002)
11. Whispering Nickel Idols (2005)
12. Cruel Zinc Melodies (2008)
13. Gilded Latten Bones (2010)
14. Wicked Bronze Ambition (2013)
15. Last Metal Romance (2027)
- Science Fiction Book Club omnibus editions:
1. The Garrett Files (collects Sweet Silver Blues, Bitter Gold Hearts, and Cold Copper Tears; 2003)
2. Garrett, P.I. (collects Old Tin Sorrows, Dread Brass Shadows, and Red Iron Nights; 2003)
3. Garrett Investigates (collects Deadly Quicksilver Lies, Petty Pewter Gods, and Faded Steel Heat; 2004)
4. Garrett on the Case (collects Angry Lead Skies, Whispering Nickel Idols; 2005)
- Roc Trade softcover omnibus editions:
1. Introducing Garrett, P.I. (collects Sweet Silver Blues, Bitter Gold Hearts, and Cold Copper Tears; 2011)
2. Garrett Takes the Case (collects Old Tin Sorrows, Dread Brass Shadows, and Red Iron Nights; 2012)
3. Garrett for Hire (collects Deadly Quicksilver Lies, Petty Pewter Gods, and Faded Steel Heat; 2013)
- Short Story
1. "Shadow Thieves"—appeared in Down These Strange Streets (2011)

== Dread Empire ==
- Main Sequence
  1. A Shadow of All Night Falling (1979)
  2. October's Baby (1980)
  3. All Darkness Met (1980)
- Prequels
  1. The Fire in His Hands (1984)
  2. With Mercy Toward None (1985)
- Sequels
  1. Reap the East Wind (1987)
  2. An Ill Fate Marshalling (1988)
  3. A Path to Coldness of Heart (2012)

Replaces The Wrath of Kings, whose manuscript was stolen, and also encompasses plot from three more titles Cook had originally planned for the main sequence. Cook speaks extensively of this in the citation interview:

- Omnibus volumes (reprinted by Night Shade Books):
  - A Cruel Wind: A Chronicle of the Dread Empire, an omnibus of the three main sequence novels (2006)
  - A Fortress in Shadow: A Chronicle of the Dread Empire, an omnibus of the two prequels (2007)
  - An Empire Unacquainted with Defeat: A Chronicle of the Dread Empire, a collection of short fiction set in the Dread Empire (2008)
  - Wrath of Kings: A Chronicle of the Dread Empire, an omnibus of the three sequel novels (2018)
- Short Stories
  - "The Nights of Dreadful Silence"—appeared in Fantastic (September 1973)
  - "Ghost Stalk"—appeared in The Magazine of Fantasy & Science Fiction (May 1978)
  - "Castle of Tears"—appeared in Whispers (October 1979)
  - "Call for the Dead"—appeared in The Magazine of Fantasy & Science Fiction (July 1980)
  - "Soldier of an Empire Unacquainted with Defeat"—appeared in The Berkley Showcase, Vol. 2 (August 1980)
  - "Filed Teeth"—appeared in Dragons of Darkness (October 1981)
  - "Severed Heads"—appeared in Sword and Sorceress 1 (May 1984)
  - "Finding Svale’s Daughter"—previously unpublished, appeared in An Empire Unacquainted with Defeat: A Chronicle of the Dread Empire (2008)
  - "Silverheels"—originally a standalone story which was later retrofitted into the Dread Empire series. Altered version appeared in An Empire Unacquainted with Defeat: A Chronicle of the Dread Empire (2008)
  - "Hell’s Forge"—previously unpublished, appeared in An Empire Unacquainted with Defeat: A Chronicle of the Dread Empire (2008)

== Instrumentalities of the Night ==
Epic fantasy in a reinterpreted version of 13th century Europe and Western Asia.

1. The Tyranny of the Night (2005)
2. Lord of the Silent Kingdom (2007)
3. Surrender to the Will of the Night (2010)
4. Working God's Mischief (March 2014)

== Starfishers ==
Starfishers is a science fiction series drawing on elements of Norse mythology, and in the case of Passage at Arms, World War II submarine warfare.

1. Shadowline (1982)
2. Starfishers (1982)
3. Star's End (1982)
- Related
  - Passage at Arms (1985)
- Short stories
1. "And Dragons in the Sky"—appeared in Clarion II (June 1972). Later expanded and rewritten as the novel Starfishers.
2. "Sunrise"—appeared in Eternity SF (1973)
3. "In the Wind"—appeared in Tomorrow Today (1975) and Space Dogfights (1992)
4. "The Recruiter"—appeared in Amazing Stories (March 1977)
5. "Quiet Sea"—appeared in The Magazine of Fantasy & Science Fiction (December 1978)

== Darkwar ==
Marika, a meth pup growing up in a matriarchal tribal society, loses her mother and nearly all of her pack in an attack by nomads, driven southwards by a severe winter and led by a rogue male. She is taken in by the silth, meth females who rule the world with their mental powers, because they have detected in her the talent to become a powerful silth herself. As she grows and develops, she proceeds to shake meth society to its very roots.

1. Doomstalker (1985)
2. Warlock (1985)
3. Ceremony (1986)
- Short story
1. "Darkwar"—appeared in Isaac Asimov's Science Fiction Magazine (December 1982)

== Standalone novels ==
- The Swap Academy (1970) (written as "Greg Stevens")
- The Heirs of Babylon (1972)
- The Swordbearer (1982)
- A Matter of Time (1985)
- The Dragon Never Sleeps (1988)
- The Tower of Fear (1989)
- Sung in Blood (1992)

== Standalone short stories ==
- "Silverheels"—originally appeared in Witchcraft and Sorcery #6 (May 1971); a slightly altered version appeared in An Empire Unacquainted with Defeat: A Chronicle of the Dread Empire (2008)
- "Song from a Forgotten Hill"—appeared in Clarion (June 1971)
- "Appointment in Samarkand"—appeared in Witchcraft and Sorcery #7 (November 1972)
- "The Devil's Tooth"—appeared in Literary Magazine of Fantasy and Terror, Volume 1, #5 (1974)
- "The Seventh Fool"—appeared in The Magazine of Fantasy & Science Fiction (March 1978)
- "Ponce"—appeared in Amazing Science Fiction (November 1978)
- "Enemy Territory"—appeared in Night Voyages #9 (Spring 1983)
- "Winter's Dream"—appeared in The BSFAN—Balticon 31 Program Book (1997)
- "The Good Magician"—appeared in Songs of the Dying Earth: Stories in Honor of Jack Vance edited by George R. R. Martin & Gardner Dozois, Tor Books (2010)

== Short story collections ==
- Winter’s Dreams (2012)
- The Best of Glen Cook: 18 Stories from the Author of The Black Company and The Dread Empire (2019)
