= October's Baby =

1980 novel by Glen Cook

- Author: Glen Cook
- Cover artist: Kinuko Y. Craft
- Language: English
- Series: Dread Empire
- Genre: Epic fantasy
- Publisher: Berkley Books
- Publication date: March 1980
- Publication place: United States
- Media type: Print (paperback)
- Pages: 248
- ISBN: 0-425-04532-3
- OCLC: 9667561
- Preceded by: A Shadow of All Night Falling
- Followed by: All Darkness Met

October's Baby is a novel by Glen Cook published in 1980.

== Plot summary ==
October's Baby is the second book in the Dread Empire series.

== Reception ==
Greg Costikyan reviewed October's Baby in Ares Magazine #5 and commented that "Cook's action writing is clean and sparse, but his attempts at character development are somewhat more awkward. The characters do not blend seamlessly into the body of writing, but seem to stand out at odd moments, when the thrust of action comes to a halt."

== Reviews ==
- Review by Kathleen Dalton-Woodbury [as by Kathleen D. Woodbury] (1980) in Science Fiction Review, Winter 1980
- Review by Roz Kaveney (1981) in Foundation, #21 February 1981
