= Black company =

Black company may refer to:

== Military units ==
- Black Company, combatants in the 1520s German Peasants' Revolt
- Black Company of Pioneers, a British Loyalist military unit during the American Revolution

== Literature ==
- The Black Company, a fantasy book series by Glen Cook
  - The Black Company (novel), the first book in the series, released in 1984
  - The Black Company (role-playing game), a role playing game based on the series
- The Dungeon of Black Company, a 2016 manga series by Yōhei Yasumura

== Other ==
- Black company (Japan), companies with unethical or questionable working arrangements in Japan
- Black-owned business, companies owned by African-Americans in the United States
