= The Silver Spike =

1989 novel by Glen Cook

- Author: Glen Cook
- Cover artist: Keith Berdak
- Language: English
- Series: The Black Company
- Genre: Epic fantasy, Dark fantasy
- Publisher: Tor Fantasy
- Publication date: September 1989
- Publication place: United States
- Media type: Print (Paperback)
- Pages: 313
- ISBN: 0-8125-0220-5
- OCLC: 20269842

The Silver Spike is a spin-off novel from Glen Cook's The Black Company. The story combines elements of epic fantasy and dark fantasy as it follows two former members of The Black Company and the formerly renowned "White Rose" down their own path after parting ways with the company following the events at the conclusion of The White Rose.

== Plot summary ==
The Dominator was a wizard of immense power who could not be killed by his enemies. He was, however, defeated and his evil essence imprisoned in a silver spike. The power inherent in the spike is so greatly feared and desired that some try to steal it, while others try to keep it from falling into anyone's hands.

== Characters in "The Silver Spike" ==
=== Spike Hunters ===
- Tully Stahl
- Smeds Stahl – Tully's cousin
- Old Man Fish (Forto Reibas)
- Timmy Locan

=== The White Rose Rebellion ===
- Darling (Tonie Fisk) – The White Rose
- Silent – Wizard formerly of The Black Company
- Bomanz the Wakener (Seth Chalk)
- Brother Bear Torque
- Donkey Dick “Stubby” Torque
- Paddlefoot Torque

=== The Northern Empire ===
- Brigadier Wildbrand
- Gossamer – Wizard and Spidersilk's twin
- Spidersilk
- Exile – Imperial wizard from Charm

=== Others ===
- Philodendron Case (the narrator)
- Raven – formerly of The Black Company
- Toadkiller Dog
- The Limper – one of The Ten Who Were Taken
