= Dread Brass Shadows =

Novel by Glen Cook

- Author: Glen Cook
- Cover artist: Tim Hildebrandt
- Language: English
- Series: Garrett P.I.
- Genre: Fantasy, mystery
- Publisher: Roc
- Publication date: May 1990
- Publication place: United States
- Media type: Print (paperback)
- Pages: 256
- ISBN: 0-451-45008-6
- OCLC: 21578410
- Preceded by: Old Tin Sorrows
- Followed by: Red Iron Nights

Dread Brass Shadows is a fantasy novel by American writer Glen Cook, the fifth novel in his ongoing Garrett P.I. series. The series combines elements of mystery and fantasy as it follows the adventures of private investigator Garrett.

== Plot introduction ==
Garrett is a hardboiled detective living in the city of TunFaire, a melting pot of different races, cultures, religions, and species. When people have problems, they often come to Garrett for help, but trouble has a way of finding Garrett on its own, whether he likes it or not.

== Plot summary ==
Tinnie Tate, Garrett's girlfriend, comes to visit him and is stabbed in the middle of the street. Garrett and his friend Saucerhead Tharpe chase down the would-be assassin, but before they can interrogate him, he is killed by a crossbow-wielding band of hooligans. The only clue as to the villain's motive is mention of a book. Meanwhile, a big, tough, attractive bounty hunter named Winger visits Garrett; she has also been hired to look for the book. When a young woman named Carla Lindo Ramada wants to hire Garrett to find the book, at least she sheds some light on the mystery. (She looks like Tinnie, which explains why Tinnie was nearly killed.) People are looking for the Book of Dreams (or Book of Shadows), a legendary magical tome that enables the owner to take on any of a hundred different identities, along with their abilities. For example, the book's possessor could turn him/herself into a powerful magician.

As word gets out, several parties join the hunt. Among the seekers are Gnorst Gnorst, head of Dwarf Town; Chodo Contague, the crime kingpin of TunFaire; Lubbock, a fat wannabe wizard and Winger's employer; and The Serpent, a witch partially responsible for creating the Book of Shadows.

When his desire for the Book of Shadows grows and he is deliberately misled, Chodo turns on Garrett. In an attempt to save himself, Garrett forms an uneasy alliance with Crask and Sadler, Chodo's main henchmen, to overthrow the crime lord. (The pair had loyally served Chodo, expecting to inherit his power when he finally died, but the book would make him practically immortal.) In a confused battle at Chodo's mansion involving all the parties, Crask and Sadler manage to take over from their boss, while Garrett and Winger escape alive.

When Garrett returns home, he finds that Carla Lindo Ramada has escaped with the Book of Shadows, which had been hidden at Garrett's house the entire time. He tracks Carla down and take the book. Garrett then has it destroyed before any more evil can be committed for its possession.

== Critical reception ==
Richard E. Geis in the Science Fiction Review criticized the novel for not delivering answers to several questions raised by the plot, and for "the use of present-day slang [that] stopped me cold", calling Cook's dialogue philosophy "lazy and the equivalent of playing tennis with the net down."

== Characters ==
- Garrett
- The Dead Man
- Dean
- Morley Dotes
- Saucerhead Tharpe
- Tinnie Tate
- Winger
- Carla Lindo Ramada
- Crask and Sadler
- Chodo Contague
- Gnorst Gnorst
- Lubbock (Fido Easterman)
- The Serpent
