= The Black Company (role-playing game) =

Tabletop role-playing game

- Designers: Robert J. Schwalb; Owen K.C. Stephens; Scott Gearin
- Publishers: Green Ronin Publishing
- Publication: 2004
- Genres: Dark fantasy
- Systems: d20 System

The Black Company Campaign Setting is a d20 system Fantasy role-playing game based on the Black Company book series by Glen Cook.

== History ==
With the Mythic Vistas series, Green Ronin Publishing moved in the direction of licensing, including The Black Company (2004) which was based on The Black Company novel series by Glen Cook. Green Ronin published the Black Company hardcover as one of several highly expensive books despite the company's financial problems at the time.

== Reception ==
Black Company won the Silver ENnie Award for "Best Campaign Setting or Setting Supplement" in 2005.

Scott Taylor for Black Gate said "Green Ronin publishing did a D20 RPG on the Black Company in 2004 with an outstanding Wayne Reynolds cover. This particular game [...] does a fantastic job of capturing the rather unique universe of Cook's Company. A retooled magic system and some of the best RPG based war rules are included within, but again, the cover draws you to the book."

== Reviews ==
- Backstab #51
