= Petty Pewter Gods =

Novel by Glen Cook

- Author: Glen Cook
- Language: English
- Series: Garrett P.I.
- Genre: Fantasy, mystery
- Publisher: Roc
- Publication date: November 1995
- Publication place: United States
- Media type: Print (paperback)
- Pages: 296
- ISBN: 0-451-45478-2
- OCLC: 33327218
- Preceded by: Deadly Quicksilver Lies
- Followed by: Faded Steel Heat

Petty Pewter Gods is a fantasy novel by American writer Glen Cook, the eighth novel in his ongoing Garrett P.I. series. The series combines elements of mystery and fantasy as it follows the adventures of private investigator Garrett.

== Plot introduction ==
Garrett is a hardboiled detective living in the city of TunFaire, a melting pot of different races, cultures, religions, and species. When people have problems, they often come to Garrett for help, but trouble has a way of finding Garrett on its own, whether he likes it or not.

== Plot summary ==
TunFaire is in a state of unrest; with the sudden end of the war in the Cantard, returning former soldiers are at odds with the half-breeds and immigrants who have taken their places in society. Garrett, however, has his own problems to worry about - he gets knocked out, brought before a group of small-time gods known as the Godoroth, and forced into working for them. The goal: find the "key" to the one remaining temple up for grabs in TunFaire, and do so before the Shayir, the Godoroth's rivals. The Shayir find out about the Godoroth's plans. The Shayir capture Garrett and give him their side of the story. Only with the help of a renegade Shayir called Cat does Garrett manage to escape.

As the civil unrest escalates into full-fledged street warfare, the Godoroth and Shayir elevate their search for Garrett, and Cat, who has her own agenda, is apparently the only one Garrett can trust. When the battle between the Godoroth and Shayir spills over into the world of the living, causing madness in the streets of TunFaire, the more powerful gods of the city decide it is time to intervene. After an epic battle between gods, Garrett hopes the trouble is over, but the Dead Man thinks there is still a missing piece or two to the puzzle. Eventually, the Dead Man deduces that there was yet another party behind the struggle between the Godoroth and Shayir. When everything settles down and is sorted out, the remaining gods go back to their own business, leaving Garrett to go back to his beer.

== Characters ==
- Garrett
- The Dead Man
- Dean
- The Goddamn Parrot (Mr. Big)
- Morley Dotes
- Saucerhead Tharpe
- Winger

== Allusions to other works ==
One of the characters in Petty Pewter Gods, "Nog the Inescapable", appears to be a homage to "Chun the Unavoidable" from Jack Vance's short story "Liane the Wayfarer" in his Dying Earth series.

In both storylines, the protagonist (Liane, Garret) has a gadget (Liane's ring, Garret's rope) that creates a pocket in space that they can hide in. In both cases they encounter a small creature (a Twk-man, a pixie) who "saw what they did". Both at the end of Liane the Wayfarer and at a critical juncture in Petty Pewter Gods, when the protagonist finally uses their gadget to hide from their nemesis (Chun, Nog), it proves useless.
