= Soldiers Live =

2000 military fantasy novel by Glen Cook

- Author: Glen Cook
- Cover artist: Nicholas Jainschigg
- Language: English
- Series: The Black Company
- Genre: Epic fantasy, dark fantasy
- Publisher: Tor Fantasy
- Publication date: July 2000
- Publication place: United States
- Media type: Print (paperback)
- Pages: 566
- ISBN: 0-8125-6655-6
- OCLC: 46654352
- Preceded by: Water Sleeps

Soldiers Live is the ninth novel in Glen Cook's ongoing series, The Black Company. The series combines elements of epic fantasy and dark fantasy as it follows an elite mercenary unit, The Black Company, through roughly forty years of its approximately four hundred-year history.

== Plot summary ==
Croaker, no longer dictator of Taglios or Captain of the company, resumes his old role as Annalist. Sleepy is now Captain, and no Black Company member has died in battle for four years. But when the company's old adversaries try to bring about the apocalyptic Year of the Skulls, the company is brought to the edge of destruction.

== Characters in "Soldiers Live" ==
- Croaker
- Lady
- Sleepy
- Tobo
- Shukrat
- Arkana
- The Daughter of the Night (Booboo)
- Goblin
- Shivetya (the demon)
- One-Eye
- Murgen
