= Bleak Seasons =

1996 military fantasy novel by Glen Cook

- Author: Glen Cook
- Cover artist: Nicholas Jainschigg
- Language: English
- Series: The Black Company
- Genre: Epic fantasy, dark fantasy
- Publisher: Tor Fantasy
- Publication date: April 1996
- Publication place: United States
- Media type: Print (paperback)
- Pages: 307
- ISBN: 0-8125-5532-5
- OCLC: 36292044
- Preceded by: Dreams of Steel
- Followed by: She Is the Darkness

Bleak Seasons is the sixth novel in Glen Cook's ongoing series, The Black Company. The series combines elements of epic fantasy and dark fantasy as it follows an elite mercenary unit, The Black Company, through roughly forty years of its approximately four hundred-year history.

== Plot summary ==
Taking place in part during the events of Dreams of Steel, which was told from the point of view of Lady, this story examines the events surrounding Murgen, who is trapped within the siege of Dejagore where atrocities are being committed by both sides. The book also examines events later in Taglios under rule of the Liberator and the increasing tensions between the Black Company and the Radisha, as well as the ever-present threats from the Stranglers and of some new deception by Soulcatcher and the Howler. Bleak Seasons is unique among the Black Company series for the unusual narrative device of Murgen being totally unfixed in time and uncertain of when he will experience another seizure and move between distant past, recent past and a vaguely comprehended present. This narrative device is followed through three-quarters of the novel until we come to understand the traumas that have led Murgen to this point, while the enchantment that has made it possible remains unclear. The tone is introspective, haunted and mysterious. This novel introduces several key elements and characters to the series, including visions of the frozen caverns, Sahra, Uncle Doj, Mother Gota, One-Eye's black spear, and the manipulation of the comatose wizard Smoke.

== Characters in "Bleak Seasons" ==
=== The Company ===
- Murgen- Narrator and protagonist. Standard-bearer and new annalist of the Company, he is unaware that Lady and Croaker have survived during much of the narrative, when he lives the past.
- Croaker- Captain of the Black Company and former annalist. Also known as the Liberator, he is the military dictator of Taglios.
- Lady- Lieutenant of the Black Company and Croaker's lover. Once a dark sorceress and empress in the North, she has lost all of her magical powers, but they are slowly showing signs of returning.
- Mogaba- cannibalistic leader of the Nar during the siege of Dejagore and major antagonist during much of the novel, where he is revealed as a traitor to the Company. Later becomes leader of Longshadow's army.
- Sindawe- 2nd ranking member of the Nar who breaks with Mogaba and rejoins Croaker after the siege of Dejagore.
- One Eye- one of the two remaining wizards, works closely with Murgen during the siege of Dejagore. Develops a magical spear to combat the Shadowlords.
- Goblin- the second wizard of the Black Company often feuding with One Eye, also inside Dejagore.
- The Nar- a group of thirty-two men taken up from Gea Xle, part of the Company's descendants when the company came through Gea Xle the first time. They become divided after Mogaba's murderous rituals and treachery become clear.
- Sleepy- Black Company recruit from Dejagore who becomes Murgen's protégé.

=== The Taglios Empire ===
Territories and peoples under the nominal rule of the metropolis of Taglios after the fall of most of the Shadowlords. Taglian culture loosely resembles that of India.

- Prahbrindrah Drah- the prince of Taglios and its nominal ruler, his is often second-fiddle to his domineering sister.
- Radisha Drah- the prince's big sister and the real ruling power.
- Willow Swan- A northern adventurer who becomes a leader in the Radisha's army.
- Cordy Mather- Companion of Willow Swan. He becomes the Radisha's clandestine lover.
- Blade- Friend of Swan and Mather, early on is a leader of one of Lady's legions but he comes to be viewed as a traitor after an altercation with Croaker, and ends up serving under Mogaba in Longshadow's army.
- Smoke- Native wizard of Taglios who is comatose. Black Company discovers he can be used as a device to travel to distant places and times.
- The Gunni- Followers of a religious sect loosely resembling Hinduism. Believe in reincarnation, vegetarianism and many deities.
- The Vedhna- Followers of a religious sect loosely resembling Islam. Monotheistic, deny reincarnation, believe in heaven and hell, oppose idolatry, pray several times each day.
- The Shandar- Follower of a religious sect loosely resembling Sikhism, blending aspects of Gunni and Vedhna thought. Wear beards and hair in turbans.

=== Nyueng Bao ===
The Nyueng Bao are a mysterious people living in the swamps west of Taglios, several of whom have become trapped inside Dejagore with The Black Company while they are on a pilgrimage. As Mogaba's reign of terror unfolds, they form an alliance with Murgen's faction of the Company.

- Ky Sahra (aka Sarie)- An extremely beautiful woman. She becomes romantically involved with Murgen.
- Ky Gota (aka Mother Gota, The Troll)- Mother of Thai Dei and Sahra. Ugly and bad-tempered.
- Thai Dei- assigns himself as bodyguard to Murgen after Murgen saves his life during the siege of Dejagore.
- Uncle Doj- Master of the Path of the Sword, which is both a spiritual expression and a martial art. His sword is Ash Wand.
- Hong Tray- Mother of Ky Gota and wife of Ky Dam. She has a prophetic insight that Sahra's and Murgen's romance is meant to be even though it breaks Nyeng Bao taboos.
- Ky Dam- Speaker of the Nyueng Bao pilgrims in Dejagore.

=== Forces of Darkness and Chaos ===
- Shadowmasters—Wizards who manipulate the "shadows," ghostlike malicious entities from the Glittering Plain that are lethal to living things and also excellent spies. The Shadowmasters overran the territories between the Glittering Plain (in the ultimate south of this world) and the tropical metropolis of Taglios. As the novel opens, the Shadowmasters have trapped a group of the Black Company inside Dejagore. There are two remaining Shadowmasters at this point. 1) Longshadow: Wizard and Shadowmaster based at distant fortress of Overlook near the mysterious shadowgate and the Glittering Plain. 2) Shadowspinner- Shadowmaster whose forces have surrounded Dejagore during early part of the novel.
- Lisa Daele Bowalk- apprentice of the dead wizard Shifter who is trapped in the form of a wereleopard. She has a grudge against One-Eye.
- Soulcatcher- Sorceress and sister of Lady. She is the nemesis of the Black Company. She is one of the "Ten Who Were Taken," powerful wizards who served in the former empire of Lady and her first husband, the Dominator.
- The Howler- Another wizard from the "Ten Who Were Taken," the Howler often screams uncontrollably. Despised and mistrusted by others amid shifting alliances, he is nevertheless highly valued as a master of flying carpets.
- Daughter of the Night- Daughter of Lady and Croaker who was kidnapped at birth. She has been consecrated to Kina by the Stranglers.
- The Stranglers (or The Deceivers)- A murderous cult committed to Kina, based loosely on the Indian "Thuggee."
- Narayan Singh- Leader of The Deceivers who kidnapped the Daughter of the Night.
- Kina- Mythical goddess of destruction based loosely on the Hindu Kali. The Stranglers believe the Daughter of the Night can awaken her through bringing on an apocalyptic event they call "The Year of The Skulls." Lady and Murgen are both troubled by visions of Kina.
