= Sweet Silver Blues =

1987 novel by Glen Cook

- Author: Glen Cook
- Cover artist: Tim Hildebrandt
- Language: English
- Series: Garrett P.I.
- Genre: Fantasy, mystery
- Publisher: Roc
- Publication date: August 1987
- Publication place: United States
- Media type: Print (paperback)
- Pages: 256
- ISBN: 0-451-45070-1
- OCLC: 25857780
- Followed by: Bitter Gold Hearts

Sweet Silver Blues is a fantasy novel by American writer Glen Cook, the first novel in his ongoing Garrett P.I. series. The series combines elements of mystery and fantasy as it follows the adventures of private investigator Garrett.

== Plot ==
Garrett is a private investigator living in the city of TunFaire, a melting pot of different races, mixed breeds, cultures and religions, though humans predominate. He is approached by the wealthy Tate family. Denny Tate, an old army buddy of Garrett's, has died in an accident. In his will, Denny left an enormous fortune in silver, acquired through questionable means, to a woman his family knows nothing about, Kayean Kronk. Denny's father Willard tries to hire Garrett to locate Kayean, who is believed to be living in the Cantard, the battleground of a generations-old war between the kingdoms of Karenta and Venageta. Having survived his mandatory five-year service there (which many do not), Garrett wants no part of it.

Then Denny's partners try to steal the silver and his writings, the latter so they can continue operating as before. For the 10% executor's fee and also to be reunited with Kayean Kronk (a teenage love of Garrett's), Garrett reluctantly heads off to the Cantard with his half-dark elf friend and assassin Morley Dotes, who has his own agenda, and the Roze triplets. Denny's beautiful cousins, Rose and Tinnie Tate, try to tag along, but Garrett forcibly sends them back.

When they arrive in Full Harbor, a major Karentine base/city, Garrett makes inquiries, but nobody wants to talk about Kayean, not even her brother. Eventually, he discovers that Kayean loyally followed her husband when he and his brother joined a nest of much despised and feared vampires. A centaur named Zeck Zack, who sometimes works with the vampires, and several other parties become involved. After forcing the truth out of Zack, Garrett and his gang set out to rescue Kayean. In a desperate battle, Garrett retrieves her (as well as Rose and Tinnie Tate and Garrett's friend Saucerhead Tharpe) from the vampire lair. Morley kills Kayean's husband and takes her brother-in-law prisoner.

They return to TunFaire, where Garrett delivers Kayean to the Tates. Willard Tate hires TunFaire's foremost expert to cure her. Because she fought the vampire disease, her prognosis is good.

Meanwhile, Morley, with Garrett and Saucerhead Tharpe along as guards, delivers the vampire he captured (currently dormant for lack of sustenance) to the kingpin of the criminal underworld of TunFaire. It turns out that the vampire was the kingpin's right-hand man, until he and his brother fled with half of the kingpin's treasure. The kingpin, expecting to see a corpse (in exchange for forgiving Morley Dotes' transgressions), is instead killed by the famished vampire.

With his new riches, Garrett purchases the house he has been living in with the Dead Man, a murdered Loghyr who reluctantly helps Garrett out on his cases. (A Loghyr's spirit can linger after death, in the Dead Man's case for four centuries and counting.)

== Characters ==
- Garrett
- The Dead Man
- Rose Tate
- Tinnie Tate
- Willard Tate
- Lester Tate
- Morley Dotes
- Saucerhead Tharpe
- The Roze Triplets
- Playmate
- Zeck Zack
- Kayean Kronk

== Reception ==
The St. James Guide to Science Fiction Writers (4th edition) says that it is "the first novel by Cook to display any real humor, a light approach that was essentially new territory."
