= Shadows Linger =

1984 novel by Glen Cook

- Author: Glen Cook
- Cover artist: Keith Berdak
- Language: English
- Series: The Black Company
- Genre: Epic fantasy, Dark fantasy
- Publisher: Tor Fantasy
- Publication date: October 1984
- Publication place: United States
- Media type: Print (Paperback)
- Pages: 312
- ISBN: 0-8125-3372-0
- OCLC: 11581719
- Preceded by: The Black Company
- Followed by: The White Rose

Shadows Linger (released October 1984) is the second novel in Glen Cook's ongoing series, The Black Company. The series combines elements of epic fantasy and dark fantasy as it follows an elite mercenary unit, the Black Company.

== Background ==
The Black Company's latest employer is the Lady. The Lady had helped her husband, the Dominator, forge and rule an evil empire, with the aid of the Ten Who Were Taken, very powerful wizards and rivals the Dominator had overcome and turned into loyal minions using magic. They were eventually defeated by the White Rose. However, the White Rose was not able to kill any of them; the best she could do was to bury and imprison them in the Barrowlands. After many years, the Lady tricked a foolish wizard into freeing her; she released the Taken, but betrayed the Dominator, leaving him imprisoned.

== Plot summary ==
The Black Company is ordered to march thousands of miles across the Lady's vast empire to the Barrowland. A small detachment, including the Company's doctor and historian, Croaker, is flown to Juniper, a run-down port outside the empire, at the request of the local prince, to investigate a mysterious black castle, a possible magical connection to the Barrowland.

Raven, a deserter from the Company, and his ward Darling are living at Marron Shed's dilapidated hotel in Juniper. Raven has been accumulating money any way he can, including selling dead (and almost dead) bodies to the non-human residents of the black castle, which is steadily growing. Shed also desperately needs money, to pay his loanshark Krage. Raven lets him participate in his body-selling venture. When Raven and Shed find out that Shed's acquaintance, Asa, has been robbing the dead in Juniper's Catacombs, they follow suit. Krage and Raven clash; when Krage tries to kill Raven, he loses, and he and many of his henchmen are sold to the castle.

Two of the Lady's most powerful wizards, Whisper and Feather, arrive to investigate the castle and determine that it is an attempt by the Dominator to escape. If the castle gets enough bodies, the Dominator will be freed.

Once he learns of Raven's presence, Croaker becomes worried, for he knows why he deserted: Darling is the reincarnation of the White Rose. If the Lady ever found out, Croaker and the rest of the Company would be done for. Fortunately, Raven and Darling sail away as soon as the winter ice melts, taking Asa with them, in the ship Raven had had built with his ill-gotten loot.

Shed continues to have money troubles, and is caught by the Black Company after selling a few more bodies. Croaker cannot hand him over to Whisper for questioning, as the Company's connection to Darling would be revealed, so he fakes Shed's death. Asa returns shortly afterwards, bringing news that Raven has been killed.

Meanwhile, fierce fighting breaks out between the castle's inhabitants and the Lady's forces, now including the Lady herself, the Taken Limper, Feather and Journey, as well as the remainder of the Black Company. Because the Lady has become suspicious of the Company's activities, in the confusion of the climactic battle, Croaker, Shed, Asa, the Lieutenant and many of the old-time Company members sail away. The Captain, the Company's leader, dies after stealing the Lady's flying carpet and trying to join them on it. The Lieutenant is chosen as his successor.

At the next port, the fleeing band find Raven's ship. Croaker determines that their friend had only staged his death and the men begin searching for him and Darling. In the process, they discover that some of the Dominator's minions had slipped away from Juniper and planted the seed for another castle in a new, more secluded spot. Croaker informs the Lady when she contacts him magically.

Back in Juniper, the Lady emerges victorious over her husband. Whisper and the Limper then take an unauthorized side trip to track down the remnants of the Company. The Lieutenant barely gets away in the ship with most of the men, but Croaker, Shed, Company wizards Silent, Goblin and One-Eye, and a few others are left behind. With no other choice, they ambush the Taken and hurt them badly enough to get away, though Shed is killed.

When they catch up with the Lieutenant, they learn that he found Darling, and Raven had died in an accident. They become Rebels—the very group they were fighting against—to protect Darling and to spend the next 29 years on the run, waiting for the return of the Great Comet, which prophecies say will signal the downfall of the Lady.

== Characters ==
=== The Black Company ===
- Croaker - the company's doctor and historian
- The Captain - leader of the Black Company
- The Lieutenant - his second in command
- Silent - moderately talented company wizard
- Goblin - moderately talented company wizard
- One-Eye - moderately talented company wizard
- Elmo - the sergeant
- Otto and Hagop - veteran mercenaries

=== The Empire ===
- The Lady
- The Taken
  - Limper, one of the original Ten Who Were Taken
  - Whisper, a Rebel leader and wizard turned into a replacement Taken
  - Feather, a Rebel wizard turned into a replacement Taken
  - Journey, a Rebel wizard turned into a replacement Taken

=== Residents of Juniper ===
- Marron Shed - owner of the Iron Lily, an establishment one step up from a flophouse. He is deeply in debt to loansharks.
- Raven - a mysterious resident of the Lily and a deserter from the Black Company
  - Darling - a barmaid at the Lily. Years before, she was rescued as a young child by Raven.
- Krage - Shed's main creditor
- Asa - a homeless ne'er-do-well who will do anything to avoid honest work. Marron Shed is the closest thing he has to a friend.
- Gilbert - a loanshark to whom Shed becomes indebted after Krage's disappearance
