= The White Rose (Cook novel) =

1985 novel by Glen Cook

- Author: Glen Cook
- Cover artist: Keith Berdak
- Language: English
- Series: The Black Company
- Genre: Epic fantasy, Dark fantasy
- Publisher: Tor Fantasy
- Publication date: April 1985
- Publication place: United States
- Media type: Print (Paperback)
- Pages: 310 pp
- ISBN: 0-8125-0844-0
- OCLC: 43005218
- Preceded by: Shadows Linger
- Followed by: Shadow Games

The White Rose is the third novel in Glen Cook's ongoing series, The Black Company. The series combines elements of epic fantasy and dark fantasy as it follows an elite mercenary unit, The Black Company, through roughly forty years of its approximately four hundred-year history.

== Plot introduction ==
Centuries in the past, the Dominator and his wife, the Lady, (both supremely skilled in the art of magic), had founded an empire legendary for evil. They were overthrown by a rebellion led by the White Rose, but even in defeat, they remained too powerful to be killed; the best the rebels could do was to imprison them and their most powerful minions in the Barrowland. A wizard named Bomanz awakened the Lady in an attempt to learn from her, but she used him to gain her freedom and rebuild the empire. However, she betrayed her husband by leaving him where he was.

A rebellion broke out against the Lady's new empire; the Black Company played a key role in putting it down (as detailed in The Black Company). Later, the Company also assisted the Lady in preventing her husband from escaping his prison (as recounted in Shadows Linger), but it was forced to flee her wrath when she discovered that it had unknowingly sheltered the reborn White Rose.

== Plot summary ==
The Black Company has taken refuge from the Lady in the Plain of Fear. Its magical, non-human denizens are powerful enough to daunt even her. Among them is Old Father Tree, a god manifesting itself as a tree planted in the exact center of the plain. From this sanctuary, the White Rose rebuilds and directs the rebellion.

No wizard in the world can rival the Lady's magical skill and power, but the White Rose is immune to magic and as she matures, the magic-free zone around her expands. (This explains how her former incarnation was able to defeat the Lady and the Dominator.)

After several years of relative peace, the pace picks up. The Taken and their armies gather on the borders of the plain, threatening to swamp the vastly outnumbered rebels. Also, couriers begin arriving from the far eastern reaches of the empire, among them Tracker and Toadkiller Dog, a man and his mutt. Each messenger bears a letter for Croaker, describing what some unnamed rebel spy has found out about Bomanz. The last letter claims that the wizard knew the Lady's true name. With the situation becoming increasingly desperate, the White Rose sends Croaker and wizards Goblin and One-Eye to retrieve that vital bit of information. Tracker volunteers to go with them as a guide.

When they reach the end of their journey, they soon discover that the letter-writer was Raven, a former Company stalwart (who had staged his death at the end of Shadows Linger). He had made his way to the Barrowland and started doing odd jobs for the soldiers garrisoned there. Once he gained their trust, he received permission to live in Bomanz's old house, where he covertly searched for the old wizard's papers. What he found made him attempt something beyond his abilities; he used a spell to send his spirit to check on the Dominator. His worst fears were confirmed; the bloodthirsty tyrant was awake and actively working to free himself. Fleeing in panic, Raven made a mistake, allowing two of the lesser imprisoned creatures to free themselves and leaving him trapped.

Croaker's men search Raven's house, but they arouse the Barrowland guardians' suspicions and are brought in for questioning. With their cover blown, they flee into the surrounding forest, taking Raven's vacant body and the papers he found. When they have trouble shaking their pursuers, Croaker deliberately allows himself to be captured as a distraction. He is taken to the Lady, who has unexpectedly grown fond of him.

With the imminent threat of the Dominator looming, she goes with Croaker to see the White Rose, to form an alliance against their common foe. Goblin, One-Eye, Tracker and Toadkiller Dog return shortly afterwards. They all gather in front of Old Father Tree, who recognizes them, especially the latter two. Unmasked as the escaped servants of the Dominator, they try to kill the White Rose and the Lady, but Toadkiller Dog is driven off and Tracker converted into Old Father Tree's slave. Scorn and Blister, two of the new Taken, try to assassinate their mistress but fail and pay the ultimate price for their treachery.

Soon, both the Black Company and the Lady and her minions travel back to the Barrowland to confront the Dominator, taking along a sapling, the offspring of Old Father Tree. There, both Bomanz and Raven are revived. Meanwhile, Toadkiller Dog lurks uncaptured, awaiting his chance to help his master. While preparations are being made, the Lady, emotionally vulnerable due to her growing fear of the outcome, and Croaker grow closer.

The final battle begins. The White Rose carefully approaches the burial mounds of each of the lesser minions, one by one, nullifying the spells that bind them. When they emerge, they are powerless within her zone of influence and relatively easy to kill. Finally, it is the turn of the Dominator. Even without his magic, he is practically immortal and immensely powerful, but eventually he is overcome, though at the cost of the Lieutenant and Elmo. His body is burned, his malevolent spirit infused into a silver spike which is driven into the trunk of the scion of Old Father Tree.

In the aftermath, the Limper tries to utter the Lady's true name, but guesses the wrong one. His head is chopped off by Croaker while he is helpless in the White Rose's vicinity. Then the Lady speaks the name of the White Rose, depriving her of her unique ability. Finally, Silent, of all people, speaking for the first time in Croaker's memory, truly names the Lady, rendering her powerless. Because the Lady had tied the Taken to her fate, the Taken are destroyed. The remnants of the Company, now led by Croaker as the highest ranked surviving officer, sneak away, taking the not-unwilling Lady with them.

== Characters in The White Rose ==
=== The Black Company ===
- Croaker - the Company's doctor and historian
- The Lieutenant - leader of the Black Company
- Silent, Goblin, One-Eye - moderately talented Company wizards
- Elmo - the Sergeant
- Otto and Hagop - veteran mercenaries
- Darling - believed to be the White Rose reincarnated. When she was a young girl, she had been rescued and adopted by the Company. She is surrounded by a null, a field in which magic does not work.

=== The Empire ===
- The Lady
- The Taken
  - Limper - the last of the surviving original Taken who remained in the North
  - The New Taken - Whisper, Journey, Blister, Scorn, Benefice, Learned, Creeper
- Case - a young soldier stationed at the Barrowland

=== Others ===
- The Dominator
- Old Father Tree - a deity in the form of a tree on the Plain of Fear
- Bomanz - the wizard responsible for freeing the Lady from centuries of imprisonment
- Raven - the rescuer of Darling and later deserter from the Company. He works in the Barrowland under the pseudonym of Corbie, while searching for the information that Bomanz uncovered.
- Tracker and Toadkiller Dog - a warrior and his dog, or rather two creatures in the shape of a man and a dog
