= Faded Steel Heat =

Novel by Glen Cook

- Author: Glen Cook
- Cover artist: Alan Pollack
- Language: English
- Series: Garrett P.I.
- Genre: Fantasy, mystery
- Publisher: Roc
- Publication date: June 1999
- Publication place: United States
- Media type: Print (paperback)
- Pages: 356
- ISBN: 0-451-45479-0
- OCLC: 41434192
- Preceded by: Petty Pewter Gods
- Followed by: Angry Lead Skies

Faded Steel Heat is a fantasy novel by American writer Glen Cook, the ninth book in his ongoing Garrett P.I. series. The series combines elements of mystery and fantasy as it follows the adventures of private investigator Garrett.

== Plot introduction ==
Garrett is a hardboiled detective living in the city of TunFaire, a melting pot of different races, cultures, religions, and species. When people have problems, they often come to Garrett for help, but trouble has a way of finding Garrett on its own, whether he likes it or not.

== Plot summary ==
This ninth installment in the Garrett P.I. series sees Garrett visited at home by three lovely young ladies, Tinnie Tate, Giorgi Nicholas (Nicks), and Alyx Weider, daughter of Max Weider. Alyx explains that she has been sent by her father to get Garrett to investigate an apparent extortion attempt on the Weider business by The Call, a group of human rights activists headed by Marengo North English. Meanwhile, Colonel Block and Deal Relway strike a deal with Garrett: Garrett will attempt to infiltrate The Call, reporting back to Block and Relway on their activities, while Relway and Block will try to help solve the extortion attempt on the Weiders, as well as ensure the safety of the Weiders and Tates during the ordeal.

In typical Garrett fashion, things start to get complicated when Garrett is attacked by a group of thugs while poking around the Weider brewery. After cleaning up and meeting with Max Weider, Max decides it may be best for Garrett to come to Ty Weider's and Giorgi Nicks' engagement party the following night. When Garrett returns home, the Dead Man concurs, pointing out that it will allow Garrett to investigate the motive of his assailants, as well as help him infiltrate the upper echelons of The Call's society.

With Belinda Contague as his date for the evening, Garrett stumbles into a party that turns dark quickly. By the end of the evening, two of Max Weider's children have been murdered, Max Weider's wife has died, and multiple shapeshifters have been discovered, incapacitated, and arrested. To make matters worse, Belinda Contague gets kidnapped by Crask and Sadler as the evening is winding down.

Garrett quickly hightails it to the Palms, where he has Morley hire an expert tracker, a ratgirl by the name of Pular Singe. With Pular's help, Garrett and Morley track down Crask and Sadler, freeing Belinda and dealing the mafia skull-crackers a serious blow. When Garrett returns home, he's shocked by what he finds: Dean and the Dead Man are gone!

The next day, with help from Colonel Block, Garrett tracks down and arrests Crask and Sadler, who are barely alive from their wounds. With this out of the way, Garrett starts his search for information on the shapeshifters, starting by visiting his friend at the Royal Library, Miss Linda Lee. After getting nowhere fast, Garrett heads back to the Weider's estate, where he and Colonel Block manage to sort out just how and why shapeshifters infiltrated the Weider household.

With Tinnie Tate in tow, Garrett heads out to the estate of Marengo North English, where he continues his search for the shapeshifters. North English, who gets injured in a surprise attack against The Call, has little to offer, but Garrett and Tinnie still manage to uncover one shapeshifter in the midst. With the help of Morley, Belinda Contague, and Marengo North English, Garrett hatches a plan to reunite all the guilty parties back at the Weider manor in an all-inclusive finale.

In the end, Garrett manages to solve the intertwining mysteries of the Weider murders, the shapeshifters, and The Call, and he even unearths an embezzlement scheme that has bankrupted North English and The Call. After a little more detective work, Garrett and company manage to ferret out the last remaining shapechanger in TunFaire, ending the string of murders and impersonations and bringing a small amount of peace to the city. The Dead Man, who returned home with Dean, actually helped mastermind the finale at the Weider's estate, where he had overseen the night's events from his hiding place in a large tank of beer.

== Characters ==
- Garrett
- The Dead Man
- Dean
- Tinnie Tate
- Alyx Weider
- Giorgi Nicholas (Nicks)
- Max Weider
- Ty Weider
- The Goddamn Parrot (Mr. Big)
- Marengo North English
- Colonel Westman Block
- Deal Relway
- Morley Dotes
- Winger
- Saucerhead Tharpe
- Crask and Sadler
- Belinda Contague
- Pular Singe
- Playmate
- Glory Mooncalled
