= Dreams of Steel =

1990 military fantasy novel by Glen Cook

- Author: Glen Cook
- Cover artist: Keith Berdak
- Language: English
- Series: The Black Company
- Genre: Epic fantasy, Dark fantasy, Military fantasy
- Publisher: Tor Fantasy
- Publication date: April 1990
- Publication place: United States
- Media type: Print (Paperback)
- Pages: 345
- ISBN: 0-8125-0210-8
- OCLC: 21347800
- Preceded by: Shadow Games
- Followed by: Bleak Seasons

Dreams of Steel is the fifth novel in Glen Cook's ongoing series, The Black Company. The series combines elements of epic fantasy and dark fantasy as it follows an elite mercenary unit, The Black Company, through roughly forty years of its approximately four hundred-year history.

== Plot summary ==
The book follows the storyline of both Lady and Croaker, who have been separated from the Black Company after the company's defeat at the end of Shadow Games. Lady was separated as she was overwhelmed by dying soldiers and her story begins with her digging herself out of the pile. She quickly hooks up with two strange men, Narayan Singh and his partner Ram. Lady, with those two, begins to re-assemble the army of Taglios. Lady is much different from Croaker's style of managing the people of Taglios, eliminating those who try to stand against her.

Narayan Singh is a leader in a shadow religious group who are known as The Deceivers, and worship the goddess of Kina. Kina is a Goddess of Death, and the Deceivers are trying to bring her back to this world. Lady believes that she is using the Deceivers to further her agenda, while avoiding the seduction that Kina appears to be trying against her.

While Lady builds up the Taglios army, Croaker is in the company of Soulcatcher—Lady's sister. Soulcatcher wants Croaker for two reasons: to heal her of the wounds that she received in the Books of the North, as well as to take revenge out on her sister. Soulcatcher's agenda is to spread chaos. She dresses as Lady and attacks the Shadowmaster's army to sow confusion of where anyone is. Her plan backfires as Longshadow, along with his new ally Howler, kidnap her instead of Lady. Longshadow wishes to use the knowledge that Lady has to further his own agenda. With Soulcatcher taken away, Croaker uses that freedom to escape and rejoin the army of Taglios.

Lady and Croaker miss each other and end up on opposite sides of the river, when river rises and makes fording impossible. Lady discovers that she is pregnant with Croaker's child. At the end of the book, it is revealed that the Deceivers came for her baby and escaped. Kina was not after Lady, but Lady's child.

== Characters in Dreams of Steel ==
=== The Black Company ===
- Lady - a once-powerful ruler of the Empire of The North, now the new leader and annalist for The Black Company
- Croaker - the Company's former Captain, now under the thrall of Soulcatcher

=== Taglians and Cohorts ===
- Prahbrindrah Drah - crown prince of Taglios
- Smoke - Sorcerer of Middling powers, who works for Prahbrindrah Drah
- Radisha Drah - sister of the Prahbrindrah Drah
- Willow Swan - originally from the town of Roses, travels to Taglios with his friend Cordy Mather. Becomes a military advisor to the Prahbrindrah Drah
- Cordwood "Cordy" Mather - friend of Willow Swans, also part of the Drahs' military maneuvers
- Blade - dangerous man saved from crocodiles by Willow and Cordy, now accompanies them wherever they go

=== Sorcerers ===
- Soulcatcher - thought to have been killed, returns to seek revenge on her sister Lady
- Longshadow - enigmatic shadowmaster that seeks to capture Lady
- Howler - one of the original Taken, lured from his swampy domain to aid Longshadow
