= Gilded Latten Bones =

Novel by Glen Cook

- Author: Glen Cook
- Cover artist: Unknown
- Language: English
- Series: Garrett P.I.
- Genre: Fantasy, mystery
- Publisher: Roc
- Publication date: November 2010
- Publication place: United States
- Media type: Print (paperback)
- Pages: 368
- ISBN: 978-0-451-46371-5
- Preceded by: Cruel Zinc Melodies
- Followed by: Wicked Bronze Ambition

Gilded Latten Bones is a fantasy novel by American writer Glen Cook, the thirteenth novel in his ongoing Garrett P.I. series. The series combines elements of mystery and fantasy as it follows the adventures of private investigator Garrett.

== Characters ==
- Garrett
- The Dead Man
- Dean
- Pular Singe
- Saucerhead Tharpe
- Morley Dotes
- Belinda Contague
- Playmate
- John Stretch
- General Westman Block
- Deal Relway
- Winger
- Tinnie Tate
- Max Weider
- Alyx Weider
- Strafa Algarda (Windwalker Furious Tide of Light)
- Kip Prose
- Pilsuds Vilchik (aka Jon Salvation)
