= A Matter of Time (Cook novel) =

1985 novel by Glen Cook

- Author: Glen Cook
- Cover artist: Barry Jackson
- Subject: American prisoners of war being brainwashed
- Genre: Science fiction, time travel
- Set in: Communist China and St. Louis, Missouri
- Publisher: Berkley Pub. Group
- Publication date: 1985
- Pages: 268 pages
- ISBN: 0441522130
- OCLC: 12129231

A Matter of Time is a novel by Glen Cook, combining elements of science fiction (specifically, time travel), crime fiction and spy thriller. In regard to the last, the novel in particular takes up and expands the theme of American prisoners of war being brainwashed in Communist China and their loyalties reversed – a theme made famous through the novel The Manchurian Candidate and film made on its basis.

The book was re-published in 2011, along with other earlier works of Glen Cook.

== Plot summary ==
The book has three distinct plot lines, set out in alternating chapters, and weaving back and forth in time. The reader, sharing the various points of view of the alternating characters, is in effect omniscient, knowing many things which are a mystery to the characters themselves.

=== First plot line ("The Y Axis") ===
The main plot line centers on Norman Cash, a middle-aged police detective sergeant at St. Louis, Missouri, and his younger partner John Harald. On 3 March 1975, the police is perplexed at finding a body on a snowbound street. The man had died of unclear causes, cannot be identified or accounted for by any investigation, is not on file anywhere and carried nothing on his body except for a handful of American coins from the early 20th century – the latest being a 1921 coin in mint condition.

The body was found near the home of an old lady of Central European origin named Fiala Groloch, who politely receives the police in her old-fashioned parlor, offering them tea. There is no evidence against her but Cash still feels suspicious – especially when records show the woman to be incredibly old, having lived in the same house continually since 1869. Also, old police records show that in 1921 a small-time criminal named Jack O'Brian disappeared mysteriously on the same spot; the police at the time suspected Groloch of killing him – since he had been her lover and badly abused her – but were never able to find the body. Some witnesses are found to testify that the body found in 1975 does strongly resemble the Jack O'Brian who disappeared in 1921. However, in order to link the two cases it must be assumed that time travel exists, a conclusion Cash's commander shies away from, for fear of being ridiculed should the story leak to the media, and Cash is ordered to take up other cases.

At the time, the fall of South Vietnam hits Cash hard, reviving the trauma of his soldier son Michael having gone missing in action in Vietnam back in 1967 and no certain information of his fate ever being found out. It increases the tie between Cash and his partner John, Michael's childhood friend who had been with him in Vietnam on the day he was lost.

After some time, Cash takes up the Groloch investigation again, and from a rather "loony" affair it becomes deadly serious and grim: evidence is discovered that at various times people who went into the old lady's house disappeared without a trace, including several armed gangsters; then Cash's partner John also disappears when attempting an unauthorized search of the house; when police raid the house in force, they find the old lady gone, and mysterious machinery hidden in the basement turns out to be bobby-trapped, exploding and causing more police casualties; then in another part of the town, the house of a doctor – also a refugee from Europe – burns and mysterious bodies are found in the wreckage – which seems somehow tied to the Groloch affair; and the CIA turns out to have a considerable interest in all these doings... Cash, now bitterly determined to settle accounts with the sinister Groloch, has one ace left up his sleeve: he knows of another Groloch who had been living for a century at Rochester, New York, assumes that the fugitive woman went there, and sets out in pursuit.

=== Second plot line ("The X Axis") ===
In a dystopian 2058, the world is in the grip of a totalitarian State in which Czechs are the top dogs, and the center of power is the fearsome headquarters of the Agency for State Security at Prague. The State's virtually invincible weapon is the Tachyon Displacement Data Transfer System by which the Agency can send messages into the past, warn itself of coming threats and take action to eliminate them. The system is tended by the brilliant Zumsteg brothers, Otho and Stephan, who are honest in their way and completely devoted to the State. But the psychotic Colonel Neulist, consumed with jealousy of the Zumstegs and angry because Otho's daughter Marda rejected his advances, bursts into the chamber and starts wildly shooting – causing the Tachyon system to explode. Everybody's physical bodies are destroyed, but the personalities of both the Zumstegs and their foe Neulist are hurled into the past.

The three Zumstegs find themselves in 1866, inhabiting the bodies of peasants in the then obscure village of Lidice; few people show an interest in the doings of these peasants while the great Battle of Königgrätz is fought some kilometers away. Knowing that Neulist might eventually appear in the past, the Zumstegs take the name of Groloch. In possession of advanced medical knowledge which can extend human lifespan to two hundred years and more, they decide to take the slow road back to their own time. Two of them cross the Atlantic and hole up in America, patiently waiting for the 21st century and for their beloved State to arise – Marda Zumsteg/Fiala Groloch in St. Louis, and her uncle Stephan, as Fian Groloch, in Rochester. The third, Otho Zumsteg/Fial Groloch, remains in Bohemia, taking up residence in the village of Lidice.

However, the vengeful Neulist does appear eventually and gets on his tracks. In 1942, it is the nefarious Neulist who manipulates the Nazi occupiers to destroy Lidice, causing one of the most notorious atrocities of World War II to be perpetrated just in order that his hated rival be among the victims. After the war, Neulist goes to America to settle accounts with the other two Zumstegs. He eventually gets on the trace in St. Louis, and is behind some of the sinister events which perplexed Sergeant Cash. When Fiala Groloch flees to Rochester, Neulist is also in hot pursuit of her.

=== Third plot line ("The Z Axis") ===
In Beijing, the genius psychologist and spy master Huang Hua had spent decades secretly improving the methods of brainwashing which had not worked out in the Korean War. With the outbreak of the Vietnam War, the Chinese get their North Vietnamese allies to secretly deliver some American prisoners to Huang's installation in the Gobi Desert.

Among these prisoners, considered MIA's in the US, is Sergeant Cash's son Michael Cash. Huang's techniques work on him and he becomes an ardent Maoist, committed to overthrowing American Imperialism and dreaming of himself becoming the American Mao. Huang decides to keep him and a few other Americans in China, while other brainwashed prisoners are sent back to Vietnam and eventually repatriated – to act as Chinese sleeper agents in the US.

Michael Cash rises high within the Chinese espionage system. Still, he remains flawed from Huang's point of view, being still motivated by personal feelings and not having achieved the requisite complete ruthlessness. In particular, he retains his friendship with a fellow-prisoner, Sergeant A.O."Snake" Cantrell. A fierce individualist resisting all authority, Capitalist or Communist alike, Cantrell proved immune to even the worse which Huang could do. He was destined to be sent to hard labor and die unknown in China – but Michael Cash connives at letting him join the repatriated prisoners, carrying back his knowledge of the Chinese brainwashing program. An observant journalist suspects that the returning POW's had been brainwashed and talks to Cantrell – but Cantrell refuses to be involved in anti-Communist propaganda, either, eventually ending up as a rock guitar player in Britain. Still, some editorials in the US point to the possibility of brainwashing, and Huang discovers the source of the leak.

Meanwhile, Michael Cash had been sent to Prague, to establish Chinese contacts with dissenting elements in the local Communist Party towards an eventual showdown between China and the USSR. He succeeds in the mission – but has also fallen deeply in love with his Czech Communist contact person, a woman named Ilse, left her bearing his child, and dreams hopelessly of building a life with her. However, Huang – far from open to his agent's romantic dreams – is furious at discovering Cash's having let Cantrell get away and endanger the entire program.

Michael Cash is sternly ordered to "correct his egoistic mistake" and himself go to Britain and assassinate his friend. Cash – knowing that refusal would lead to his liquidation and that Cantrell would then be killed anyway by another Chinese agent – goes through with shooting Cantrell by sniper rifle during a performance. However, he vows revenge on Huang, who had forced him into this "act of cannibalism".

=== Convegence of plot lines ===
The book's diverging plot lines come together with the explosive showdown at Rochester. Detective Cash catches up with the fugitive Grolochs, but their nemesis Neulist also comes on the scene. In the confrontation Norman Cash learns that his son Michael is still alive and is in China. Neulist fatally shoots the Grolochs and escapes. Before dying, Fiala Groloch – of whom Cash thought as an ancient old lady – reveals to Cash that in fact she is his great-granddaughter from the 21st century, and that his son Michael was her grandfather.

Michael Cash is destined to be one of the major figures of human history, as influential in the second half of the 20th century as Hitler was in its first half. When the Chinese and Russians embark on an all-out confrontation and smash each other up, Michael Cash would escape to Prague and – along with his Czech beloved, Ilse Zumsteg – would forge a new power hub centered on the Czech capital, becoming a world dictator of unprecedented power.

Having been given this shattering information, the shaken father Norman Cash is now in a position to change the course of history. He could still avert this entire future and redeem his lost son.

== Critical appraisal ==
Reviewer Malcolm Wide noted that

Cook's A Matter of Time was written in 1984 and published in 1985 – at the same time that Mikhail Gorbachev came to power in Moscow, but before the public in the West became aware that perestroika was a radical departure from all that had gone before. This was in essence the last 'window of opportunity' for an American writer to write a Cold War book holding out the specter of a Communist takeover. ... Detective Sergeant Norman Cash believes that "The Fall of Saigon marked the East's watershed victory in World War III. The West had been fighting a halfhearted and half-assed delaying action since 1945; Vietnam had marked the beginning of the end. From the fall of Saigon onward the collapse would cease to be gradual. The West, whether good or evil or whatever, was about to come apart, and at a rate which, historically speaking, would be precipitous. Cash supposed that he would live long enough to see the barbarians at the gates himself" (though he would hardly conceive of the idea that the barbarians' chieftain would be his own son ...). Already in 1986, it would have been implausible – to say the least – to seriously promote this view of the situation. ... A Matter of Time could be seen as setting a suitable coda to a very extensive genre, which exercised a considerable influence over popular imagination over decades. As such, it does possess some original and unique features. A renegade American setting up a global Communist dictatorship centered on Prague is an idea whose like was never conceived of before.
