= She Is the Darkness =

Military fantasy novel by Glen Cook

She Is The Darkness
- Author: Glen Cook
- Cover artist: Nicholas Jainschigg
- Language: English
- Series: The Black Company
- Genre: Epic fantasy, Dark fantasy
- Publisher: Tor Fantasy
- Publication date: September 1997
- Publication place: United States
- Media type: Print (Paperback)
- Pages: 470
- ISBN: 0-8125-5533-3
- OCLC: 39305738
- Preceded by: Bleak Seasons
- Followed by: Water Sleeps

She Is the Darkness is the seventh novel in Glen Cook's ongoing series, The Black Company. The series combines elements of epic fantasy and dark fantasy as it follows an elite mercenary unit called The Black Company through forty years of its approximately four hundred-year history.

== Characters in "She Is The Darkness" ==
- Croaker
- Lady
- Murgen
- One-Eye
- Goblin
- Longshadow
- Soulcatcher
- Mogaba
