= Deadly Quicksilver Lies =

Novel by Glen Cook

- Author: Glen Cook
- Language: English
- Series: Garrett P.I.
- Genre: Fantasy, mystery
- Publisher: Roc
- Publication date: March 1994
- Publication place: United States
- Media type: Print (paperback)
- Pages: 347
- ISBN: 0-451-45305-0
- OCLC: 29942692
- Preceded by: Red Iron Nights
- Followed by: Petty Pewter Gods

Deadly Quicksilver Lies is a fantasy novel by American writer Glen Cook, the seventh novel in his ongoing Garrett P.I. series. It was published in 1994. The series combines elements of mystery and fantasy as it follows the adventures of private investigator Garrett.

== Plot introduction ==
Garrett is a hardboiled detective living in the city of TunFaire, a melting pot of different races, cultures, religions, and species. When people have problems, they often come to Garrett for help, but trouble has a way of finding Garrett on its own, whether he likes it or not.

== Plot summary ==
With Dean out of town, the Dead Man asleep, and only the Goddamn Parrot for company, Garrett finds himself wishing for something new. When Winger drops by with a job investigating a woman known as Maggie Jenn, Garrett bites. Maggie, meanwhile, hires Garrett to find her missing daughter, Emerald. Everything seems to be going just fine until Garrett is attacked in the street, knocked out, and thrown in the Bledsoe's mental ward. When Garrett escapes, he discovers that the man who put him there goes by the name of Grange Cleaver, also known as The Rainmaker.

As Garrett tries to find out more, everyone urges Garrett to be careful, as The Rainmaker has quite a nasty reputation. As usual, Morley gets involved, but when he and Garrett try to capture The Rainmaker, he manages to get away. Meanwhile, Garrett continues his search for Maggie Jenn's daughter, only to find that Maggie has disappeared. In fact, Morley and Garrett discover that she may not actually be a woman at all and could actually be The Rainmaker!

When the Outfit gets involved in The Rainmaker's business, the city Watch has no choice to get involved as well. Garrett gets off free of charges, but The Rainmaker is still nowhere to be found. As word of a long buried treasure gets out, even more parties climb into the fray, leaving Garrett bruised and battered again. In a typical novel-ending plot twist, Grange Cleaver dies, things settle down, and Garrett is left to mull over the possibilities.

== Characters ==
- Garrett
- The Dead Man
- Morley Dotes
- The Goddamn Parrot (Mr. Big)
- Winger
- Colonel Westman Block
- Maggie Jenn
- Grange Cleaver (The Rainmaker)
- Saucerhead Tharpe
- Deal Relway
