= All Darkness Met =

1980 novel by Glen Cook

First edition (publ. Berkley Books) Cover artist: Kinuko Y. Craft

All Darkness Met is a novel by Glen Cook published in 1980, and the third book in the Dread Empire series.

== Reception ==
Greg Costikyan reviewed All Darkness Met in Ares Magazine #5 and commented that "Each of the books is enjoyable in its own right, although the last seems somewhat rushed toward the end – as if Cook were tempted to expand into a fourth book, but realized that he must tie up all of the remaining plot elements in the third."

== Reviews ==
- Review by Kathleen Dalton-Woodbury [as by Kathleen D. Woodbury] (1980) in Science Fiction Review, Winter 1980
- Review by Roz Kaveney (1981) in Foundation, #21 February 1981
- Review by Barry N. Malzberg (1982) in The Magazine of Fantasy & Science Fiction, June 1982
