= Angry Lead Skies =

Novel by Glen Cook

- Author: Glen Cook
- Cover artist: Alan Pollack
- Language: English
- Series: Garrett P.I.
- Genre: Fantasy, mystery
- Publisher: Roc
- Publication date: April 2002
- Publication place: United States
- Media type: Print (paperback)
- Pages: 364
- ISBN: 0-451-45875-3
- OCLC: 49380916
- LC Class: CPB Box no. 1851 vol. 13
- Preceded by: Faded Steel Heat
- Followed by: Whispering Nickel Idols

Angry Lead Skies is a fantasy novel by American writer Glen Cook, the tenth book in his ongoing Garrett P.I. series. The series combines elements of mystery and fantasy as it follows the adventures of private investigator Garrett.

== Plot ==
Garrett is a detective living in the city of TunFaire. He is no stranger to trouble—though he rarely goes looking for it, it always seems to find him.

While relaxing at home, Garrett is visited by his old friend Playmate, who brings along a boy named Kip Prose. Kip has befriended strange, indescribable creatures that most people can’t comprehend. Because of his connection to them, Kip has become a target, and others are trying to kidnap him. Despite Garrett’s reluctance, he quickly finds himself pulled into the chaos.

While investigating Playmate’s stables for clues, Garrett and his allies are ambushed by another group of bizarre, otherworldly attackers. After the fight, Morley, Saucerhead Tharpe, and Pular Singe arrive to wake Garrett and Playmate—only to discover that Kip has vanished.

Garrett and Playmate question Kip’s family in hopes of uncovering his whereabouts. Their search leads them to an enigmatic figure named Casey—an elf-like being—who claims Kip is safe, though he offers few answers.

When Playmate himself goes missing, Garrett and Pular Singe follow the trail, joined by the troublesome Roze triplets. Their search leads them to Casey’s apartment and eventually into the countryside beyond TunFaire. There, they uncover an astonishing scene: more of the mysterious elves, their alien-like spacecraft, and the unconscious bodies of Playmate, Saucerhead, and Kip.

Meanwhile, a new complication arises when John Stretch, a ratman and brother of Pular Singe, attempts to kidnap her for his mysterious agenda. Tensions rise, but Garrett manages to broker a tenuous truce with John, avoiding further bloodshed.

Back in TunFaire, Colonel Block and Deal Relway step in to contain the escalating situation with the remaining elves. Garrett negotiates an unexpected alliance between Kip Prose, industrialist Max Weider, and businessman Willard Tate. They form an agreement to produce "Three Wheels"—a revolutionary new mode of transportation.

In a final twist, Casey, the elf, vanishes before the Watch can uncover the truth about the "silver elves." Though Relway remains suspicious and frustrated by Garrett’s involvement, Garrett ultimately benefits from the outcome. With a share in the booming Three Wheel business and the Goddamn Parrot nowhere to be found, his situation improves, at least temporarily.

== Characters ==
- Garrett
- The Dead Man
- Dean
- Playmate
- Kip Prose
- The Goddamn Parrot (Mr. Big)
- Morley Dotes
- Saucerhead Tharpe
- Pular Singe
- Colonel Westman Block
- Belinda Contague
- Winger
- The Roze Triplets
- Deal Relway
- John Stretch
- Tinnie Tate
- Willard Tate
- Max Weider
