= Shadow Games (novel) =

1989 novel by Glen Cook

- Author: Glen Cook
- Cover artist: Keith Berdak
- Language: English
- Series: The Black Company
- Genre: Epic fantasy, Dark fantasy
- Publisher: Tor Fantasy
- Publication date: June 1989
- Publication place: United States
- Media type: Print (Paperback)
- Pages: 311
- ISBN: 0-8125-3382-8
- OCLC: 19891215
- LC Class: CPB Box no. 1786 vol. 10
- Preceded by: The White Rose
- Followed by: Dreams of Steel

Shadow Games is the fourth novel in Glen Cook's ongoing series, The Black Company. The series combines elements of epic fantasy and dark fantasy as it follows an elite mercenary unit, The Black Company, through roughly forty years of its approximately four hundred-year history.

== Premise ==
Marching back after the defeat of the Dominator, the Black Company is down to just seven men. They go south, where the now powerless Lady briefly takes control of her Empire and where Croaker, the Annalist and Captain of the Company, is reunited with the Annals which hold the Company's history. Continuing their travels south in search of Khatovar, where Croaker is oathbound to return the annals, they are conscripted into service yet again by the crown prince of Taglios. Their commission is to defeat the advance of the conquering Shadowmasters from the south.

== Plot summary ==
Following the defeat of the Dominator at the Barrowlands, the Black Company is down to just six men; Croaker, physician, annalist, and the newly elected captain; Goblin and One-Eye, company wizards; Otto and Hagop, company veterans; and Murgen, the company standard bearer. The Lady, formerly a powerful sorceress and ruler of the Empire of the North, follows along with the company, despondent as she deals with her newfound mortality.

Having decided to journey to Khatovar, the long lost birthplace of the Black Company, the remaining members first travel with the Lady to the Tower at Charm, where the Lady returns the lost annals to Croaker. After relaxing at the Tower for several weeks while the Lady attends to business, Croaker eventually decides to leave without the Lady, arriving at Opal after a couple weeks. Before the Company sets sail across the Sea of Torments, however, the Lady surprises everyone by appearing to join Croaker for a romantic evening, joining them on their journey south.

As the Company continues to travel south, they eventually reach the Temple of Traveler's Repose, where they are able to recover several volumes of annals that were lost long ago. Although the annals give insight into much of the Company's history, the annals containing the origin of the Company and the location of Khatovar are still missing.

The Company's journey south continues through swamps and jungles, where they arrive at the city of Gea-Xle. Here, the company meets the offspring of previous Company members. The Nar, as they are called, are led by Mogaba, a powerful, athletic soldier who is as capable a leader as he is a soldier. The Nar join with the Company, who is recruited to help disperse pirates who have become a nuisance on the trade routes to the south. After outfitting a barge as a military vessel, the Company with their new recruits travels south along the river, where they encounter the pirates after a few days. The Company easily routs the pirates' first attack, but the pirates return a few days later with a vengeance, as well as with a powerful sorcerer on their side. Although the Company is able to defend the barge from the attacking pirates, the pirate sorcerer is too powerful for One-Eye and Goblin to deal with. When it looks like the battle will turn in favor of the pirates, Croaker confronts Lady about a friend she took on in Gea-Xle, who it turns out is the former Taken Shapeshifter. With Shifter's help, the enemy sorcerer is forced to flee, upon which the Company realizes they were dealing with another former Taken in The Howler.

Continuing south, the Company meets two northerners by the names of Willow Swan and Cordy Mather, as well as their friend Blade, who are escorting the Radisha Drah, a noble from the city of Taglios. When the Company reaches Taglios, they are greeted as returning champions by the populace. Croaker, naturally suspicious, meets with the crown prince, the Prahbrindrah Drah, who is in cahoots with Swan and Mather. The Prahbrindrah Drah tries to convince the Company to help them defend Taglios from the invading Shadowmasters, a group of sorcerers from the south that threaten the city. After scouting the area for themselves, Croaker is convinced that the only way to Khatovar is through the Shadowlands, and the Black Company is forced to join forces with the Taglians to try to fight their way through the Shadowlands.

After a monumental effort trying to train the Taglians into soldiers, the Black Company wins a couple of dramatic victories over the invading armies of the Shadowmasters, and so the Company presses the attack into the Shadowlands. After arriving at the city of Stormguard (previously Dejagore), the Company encounters another enemy army and the first of the Shadowmasters. While the Company prepares to attack, Croaker and Lady, who have been developing a tenuous relationship throughout the journey south, finally consummate their relationship the night before the attack. The following morning, the Company wins another battle against the enemy armies, and Croaker prepares a trick to enter the city that night. With the ruse working to perfection, the Company storms the castle at Stormguard, where they find Shifter and one of the enemy Shadowmasters tangled in battle. It turns out the Shadowmaster is in fact the Taken called Stormbringer, who was previously thought to have been dead. She and Shapeshifter fight to near-death, and when they are both weakened One-Eye knocks them both unconscious, and then disposes of them both.

The following day, another Shadowmaster army approaches from the south, and the Black Company prepares for a final battle to break the last of the Shadowmaster forces. In the ensuing battle, it appears that the Company will eventually win, but the fighting becomes chaotic. During the melee, the Lady is swarmed by opponents, and Croaker, who is shot in the chest by an arrow, is abducted by the former Taken Soulcatcher.

== Characters in Shadow Games ==
=== The Black Company ===
- Croaker - the Company's Captain and annalist
- Lady - once powerful ruler of the Empire of The North, depowered at the Barrowland. Becomes the Company's Chief of Staff
- Goblin, One-Eye - wizards of modest talent, tend to squabble with one another when given the opportunity
- Murgen - Company standard bearer
- Otto and Hagop - longtime members of the Black Company
- Sparkle, Big Bucket (Cato Dahlia), Red Rudy, Candles - new recruits from Opal
- Cletus, Loftus, Longinus - Three brothers, engineering warfare specialists, new recruits from Beryl
- Smiley - nephew of Hagop, new recruit from Rebosa
- Shadid and 3 others - professional caravan guards from a nomad tribe called the roi
- Wheezer - wizened little man of One-Eye’s race, guide through the jungle of D’loc Aloc, later new recruit
- Geek, Freak (aka Claw-of-the-Lion and Heart-of-the-Lion) - brothers, K’Hlata guides through the savannah, were declared outlaws, became new recruits
- Frogface - an imp acquired by One-Eye in Gea-Xle
- Mogaba - an impeccable soldier from Gea-Xle, becomes the Company's Commander of Infantry
- Ochiba, Sindawe - recruits from Gea-Xle, become legion commanders

=== Taglians and Cohorts ===
- Prahbrindrah Drah - crown prince of Taglios
- Radisha Drah - sister of the Prahbrindrah Drah
- Willow Swan - white man from Roses, travels to Taglios with his friend Cordy Mather. Becomes a military advisor to the Prahbrindrah Drah
- Cordwood "Cordy" Mather - friend of Willow Swans, starts his own bar in Taglios. Also involved in the Prahbrindrah Drah's military maneuvers
- Blade - dangerous man saved from crocodiles by Willow and Cordy, now accompanies them wherever they go

=== Sorcerers ===
- Shapeshifter - Referred to simply as Shifter, he meets with the Lady in Gea-Xle, travels south with the Company while occasionally giving them aid
- The Howler - attacks the company in the swamps south of Gea-Xle, is routed by Shifter
- Moonshadow - one of the Shadowmasters, fights at Dejagore and is captured along with Croaker by Soulcatcher who eventually killed him.
- Stormbringer - one of the Shadowmasters, fights Shifter to a standstill in Dejagore
- The Stump - a mysterious entity observed only by Croaker, is ultimately revealed to be Soulcatcher
