= The Swordbearer =

- Cover of the 1982 Timescape / Pocket Books edition
- Author: Glen Cook
- Language: English
- Publication date: 1982

The Swordbearer is a 1982 novel written by Glen Cook.

== Plot summary ==
The Swordbearer is a novel in which a young man flees from his home because of invading soldiers, when he comes into possession of an ancient, soul-draining black sword forged by an unknown goddess. Corrupted by its influence, he grows increasingly ruthless, eventually killing his sister and lover. After enduring the horrors of war and descending into cynicism, he ultimately manages to free himself from the sword's grip.

== Reception ==
John T. Sapienza Jr. reviewed The Swordbearer for Different Worlds magazine and stated that "Cook's mythology comes out rather odd to my taste, but this is due partly to the fact that instead of recycling existing materials he is trying to build something different as the background for the social conflicts that move these characters. The book is full of interesing ideas. It's also a good read."

== Reviews ==
- Review by Faren Miller (1982) in Locus, #257 June 1982
- Review by Joseph J. Marchesani (1982) in Science Fiction & Fantasy Book Review, #6, July–August 1982
- Review by Roger C. Schlobin (1982) in Fantasy Newsletter, #49 July 1982
- Review by Paul McGuire (1982) in Science Fiction Review, Winter 1982
