= Bitter Gold Hearts =

1988 novel by Glen Cook

- Author: Glen Cook
- Cover artist: Tim Hildebrandt
- Language: English
- Series: Garrett P.I.
- Genre: Fantasy, mystery
- Publisher: Roc
- Publication date: June 1988
- Publication place: United States
- Media type: Print (paperback)
- Pages: 253
- ISBN: 0-451-15371-5
- OCLC: 18045819
- Preceded by: Sweet Silver Blues
- Followed by: Cold Copper Tears

Bitter Gold Hearts is a fantasy novel by American writer Glen Cook, the second book in his ongoing Garrett P.I. series. The series combines elements of mystery and fantasy as it follows the adventures of private investigator Garrett.

== Plot introduction ==
Garrett is a hardboiled detective living in the city of TunFaire, a melting pot of different races, cultures, religions, and species. When people have problems, they often come to Garrett for help, but trouble has a way of finding Garrett on its own, whether he likes it or not.

== Plot summary ==
A beautiful young woman named Amiranda Crest shows up at Garrett's house. She explains that her employer is the powerful sorceress Stormwarden Raver Styx, whose son Karl daPena has been kidnapped in Raver Styx's absence. They want Garrett to organize the exchange between them and the kidnappers. The Domina Willa Dount, who is in charge while the Stormwarden is away, explains to Garrett that they only need him as a decoy. But when he is attacked on his way home by a band of ogres, his interest in the matter is piqued.

When the kidnappers' demands rise, Garrett is brought back in for his expertise. It soon becomes apparent to him that the members of the Stormwarden family are all involved in the affair to some extent, as is a band of ogres led by a mysterious individual named Gorgeous. The link between the ogres and the dePenas appears to be a prostitute by the name of Donni Pell, who had both Karl daPena and Gorgeous as customers. She orchestrated the kidnapping of Karl by convincing Gorgeous and his band of ogres to help.

The transfer of funds with the kidnappers goes off without a hitch, but when Amiranda Crest is murdered and Karl daPena is found after allegedly committing suicide, Karl's sister Amber comes running to Garrett for help. With the help of Morley, the Roze boys, and underworld kingpin Chodo Contague's deadly lieutenants Crask and Sadler, Garrett storms Gorgeous' hideout, capturing Gorgeous and some of his cronies. The ogres, when faced with torture, offer some information about the kidnapping. Chodo orders Donni Pell to be found and delivered to Garrett.

When the Stormwarden returns to town, she comes first to Garrett to find out just what happened to her family. Garrett then manages to orchestrate a meeting between all the guilty parties, and in a masterful display of deductive reasoning, Garrett implicates Karl daPena Jr., Karl daPena Sr., Amiranda Crest, the Domina Willa Dount, Donni Pell, Gorgeous, and others all in a convoluted kidnapping scheme gone horribly wrong. With the truth out, the situation gets ugly fast, and Garrett and company flee the scene, letting city investigators clear the mess. The Dead Man sheds some light on the few remaining mysteries in the case, including who killed Amiranda and why.

== Characters ==
- Garrett
- The Dead Man
- Dean
- Amiranda Crest
- Karl daPena
- Domina Willa Dount
- Amber daPena
- Morley Dotes
- Saucerhead Tharpe
- Playmate
- Crask and Sadler
- The Roze Triplets
- Gorgeous
- Chodo Contague
- Donni Pell
- Stormwarden Raver Styx
