= Cruel Zinc Melodies =

2008 novel by Glen Cook

- Author: Glen Cook
- Cover artist: Unknown
- Language: English
- Series: Garrett P.I.
- Genre: Fantasy, mystery
- Publisher: Roc
- Publication date: May 2008
- Publication place: United States
- Media type: Print (paperback)
- Pages: 405
- ISBN: 978-0-451-46192-6
- OCLC: 183268025
- LC Class: CPB Box no. 2787 vol. 8
- Preceded by: Whispering Nickel Idols
- Followed by: Gilded Latten Bones

Cruel Zinc Melodies is a fantasy novel by American writer Glen Cook, the twelfth novel in his ongoing Garrett P.I. series. The series combines elements of mystery and fantasy as it follows the adventures of private investigator Garrett.

== Plot introduction ==
Garrett is a hardboiled detective living in the city of TunFaire, a melting pot of different races, cultures, religions, and species. When people have problems, they often come to Garrett for help, but trouble has a way of finding Garrett on its own, whether he likes it or not.

== Plot summary ==
It is winter in TunFaire, and life has slowed down for Garrett (meaning work seldom intrudes to interrupt his beer drinking and lounging about), until a parade of lovely ladies makes its way through his door, led by his favorite fiery red-head, his girlfriend Tinnie Tate. She is accompanied by Alyx Weider, a sultry temptress and daughter of the local beer baron, and several other friends. It turns out the girls have aspirations to become an acting troupe for a new theater that Alyx's father, Max Weider, is building to keep his youngest daughter happy and to have a new outlet for his product.

The trouble is that Max needs some help. It seems that construction of his theater, The World, is beset by ghosts, bugs, and break-ins. Garrett figures that this is pretty much a security job, and ends up bringing in some of the usual crew, including Saucerhead Tharpe and even Winger.

Right off the bat, Garrett wraps up the break-in problem, as it seems that a gang of kids was trying their hand at the racketeering business. The ghosts and bugs present a bit more of a problem. It turns out that the bugs are of sorcerous origin, the result of some experimentation by a group of kids from the Hill, led by Kip Prose. Worse yet, the bugs have been disturbing the sleep of a large entity from a bygone age that has been slumbering for eons beneath the ground that The World is being built on.

With Garrett's knack for finding trouble, he ends up attracting attention from the Guard, Prince Rupert, and several nasty sorcerous types from The Hill. In the end, with the help of The Dead Man, John Stretch and his telepathically controlled rats, and a smoldering hot sorceress called the Windwalker Furious Tide of Light, Garrett eliminates the bugs and makes contact with the dormant creature (through the ghostly form of Eleanor), convincing it to be careful of the humans and creatures living above it.

== Characters ==
- Garrett
- The Dead Man
- Dean
- Pular Singe
- Saucerhead Tharpe
- Morley Dotes
- Belinda Contague
- Playmate
- John Stretch
- Colonel Westman Block
- Deal Relway
- Winger
- Tinnie Tate
- Max Weider
- Alyx Weider
- Windwalker Furious Tide of Light
- Barate Algarda
- Kip Prose
- Belle Chimes (The Bellman)
- Prince Rupert
- Link Dierber
- Schnook Avery
