= A Shadow of All Night Falling =

1979 fantasy novel by Glen Cook

- First edition (publ. Berkley Books)
- Author: Glen Cook
- Publisher: Berkley Books
- Publication date: December 1, 1979
- ISBN: 978-0-425-04260-1

A Shadow of All Night Falling is a 1979 fantasy novel by Glen Cook.

== Reception ==
Greg Costikyan reviewed A Shadow of All Night Falling in Ares Magazine #2 and commented that "Cook has managed to avoid most of the traps into which fantasy writers tend to fall. His language, while striking, is not awkwardly archaic; he communicates some of the awesomeness that is the province of epic fantasy without seeming silly or mundane; his magic is believable and not trivial. He also manages to create sympathetic characters – a difficult task in epic fantasy – and his prose is clear and well-executed. A Shadow of All Night Falling is by no means a classic, but it shows great promise."

== Reviews ==
- Review by Roz Kaveney (1981) in Foundation, #21 February 1981
- Magia i Miecz #65 (May 1999) (Polish)
