= Garrett P.I. =

Fantasy novel series by Glen Cook

- Sweet Silver Blues; Bitter Gold Hearts; Cold Copper Tears; Old Tin Sorrows; Dread Brass Shadows; Red Iron Nights; Deadly Quicksilver Lies; Petty Pewter Gods; Faded Steel Heat; Angry Lead Skies; Whispering Nickel Idols; Cruel Zinc Melodies; Gilded Latten Bones; Wicked Bronze Ambition
- Author: Glen Cook
- Country: TunFaire
- Language: English
- Genre: Fantasy murder mystery
- Publisher: HarperCollins
- Published: 1987–2013
- Media type: Print (hardcover and paperback)
- No. of books: 14

Garrett P.I. is a series of fantasy novels by American writer Glen Cook about Garrett, a freelance private investigator. The novels are written in a hard-boiled detective fiction style, with elements of traditional mystery and dialogue-based humor. Garrett, during his adventures in his home city of TunFaire and across Karenta and the Cantard, has to deal with elves, vampires, centaurs, trolls, and numerous mixed breeds, along with gods, wizards, witches and more. Unlike most fantasy series, the Garrett P.I. novels focus more on the detective aspects of the story and less on the magical.

== Background ==
TunFaire is a large city in the kingdom of Karenta. It is home to an uneasy mix of humans, dwarves, elves, ogres, pixies, ratmen and various other races, along with numerous mixed breeds in seemingly endless combinations, with humans predominating. Corruption, poverty, crime and general lawlessness abound.

Karenta has been involved in a generations-long war with the kingdom of Venageta over control of the Cantard, a region that houses most of the world's silver mines. (Silver is necessary for magic.) Male humans are subject to a mandatory five years of military service, which many do not survive (including Garrett's father and brother). However, anyone who can prove they are at least one quarter non-human is exempt. This is a source of much resentment, exacerbating racial tensions.

== Works ==
=== Novels ===
1. Sweet Silver Blues (1987)
2. Bitter Gold Hearts (1988)
3. Cold Copper Tears (1988)
4. Old Tin Sorrows (1989)
5. Dread Brass Shadows (1990)
6. Red Iron Nights (1991)
7. Deadly Quicksilver Lies (1994)
8. Petty Pewter Gods (1995)
9. Faded Steel Heat (1999)
10. Angry Lead Skies (2002)
11. Whispering Nickel Idols (2005)
12. Cruel Zinc Melodies (2008)
13. Gilded Latten Bones (2010)
14. Wicked Bronze Ambition (2013)
15. Last Metal Romance (2027)

=== Short stories ===
- "Shadow Thieves" appears in Down These Strange Streets (2011) (edited by George R. R. Martin & Gardner Dozois)

=== Science Fiction Book Club omnibus editions ===
1. The Garrett Files (collects Sweet Silver Blues, Bitter Gold Hearts, and Cold Copper Tears; 2003)
2. Garrett, P.I. (collects Old Tin Sorrows, Dread Brass Shadows, and Red Iron Nights; 2003)
3. Garrett Investigates (collects Deadly Quicksilver Lies, Petty Pewter Gods, and Faded Steel Heat; 2004)
4. Garrett On The Case (collects Angry Lead Skies, and Whispering Nickel Idols; 2005)

=== Roc Trade softcover omnibus editions ===
1. Introducing Garrett, P.I. (collects Sweet Silver Blues, Bitter Gold Hearts, and Cold Copper Tears; 2011)
2. Garrett Takes the Case (collects Old Tin Sorrows, Dread Brass Shadows, and Red Iron Nights; 2012)
3. Garrett For Hire (collects Deadly Quicksilver Lies, Petty Pewter Gods, and Faded Steel Heat; 2013)

== Major characters ==
=== Garrett ===
Garrett is the protagonist of the series and, as the series name indicates, is a private investigator.

Garrett is an ex-marine with a knack for figuring things out. He is in his early 30s at the beginning of the series, 6'2" tall, with blond (or dirty blond) hair and blue eyes. He struggles to stay in shape due to his laziness and affinity for beer. Garrett survived his five years of mandatory military service as a marine in the ongoing war with Venageta. When he returned home to TunFaire, he began his freelance investigative service.

Garrett avoids work as much as possible, doing just enough to make ends meet at the beginning of the series. However, he comes into a substantial fee at the end of Sweet Silver Blues, which allows him to buy a house (with a room for his associate, the Dead Man) and hire Dean as cook and housekeeper. He initially has one steady source of income, a retainer from Max Weider to keep the insider theft at the latter's breweries in check. Later (in Angry Lead Skies), he is given a small ownership share in the highly profitable Amalgamated Manufacturing Combine (for his efforts which lead to its formation).

He becomes involved romantically with several women at various times, the most prominent being Tinnie Tate, with whom he has a tumultuous, on again-off again relationship. However, he ends up seriously involved with and engaged to Furious Tide of Light, an extremely powerful, well-connected sorceress, at the end of Gilded Latten Bones. Garrett's weakness for beautiful women often results in him trying to rescue them from their troubles. Unlike his friend Morley Dotes, Garrett has a conscience and avoids killing whenever possible, even when it would be in his best interest to do so.

=== The Dead Man ===
Garrett's partner, known only as the Dead Man, is a member of a very rare species called the Loghyr. About four hundred years before the events of Sweet Silver Blues, he was killed with a knife. However, a Loghyr's spirit can persist long after death, so his multiple minds are still functional, as are his formidable mental powers.

Within a certain range of his corpse, the Dead Man is telepathic and telekinetic. He is able to communicate through direct mind contact, as well as read and control the minds of unwilling subjects. He can lift physical objects up to the size of a small person, perhaps larger. The full extent of his powers is uncertain, and Garrett suspects he can do far more than he lets on, but he is lazy and does not want to be made to use them more than is absolutely necessary.

The Dead Man is also a deductive genius, often helping Garrett solve cases, though he prefers to give limited advice and force Garrett to solve things for himself. He entertains himself by running military simulations, putting "armies" of mind-controlled insects through maneuvers on the walls of his room.

The Dead Man's body weighs about 450 pounds and, after Garrett purchases a house, has a room of its own in it. The Dead Man is a little ragged around the edges where the vermin have pecked at him, but Loghyr flesh corrupts extremely slowly. Despite being dead, he does have to "sleep", occasionally for weeks and even months at a time, to restore his energy.

The Dead Man and Garrett are friends as well as business partners.

The Dead Man first appears in Sweet Silver Blues.

=== Morley Dotes ===
Morley is a half-dark-elf assassin and entrepreneur who eventually opens his own restaurant and bar. Morley has a reputation as being the best street fighter in TunFaire. He is vain and conceited, a dedicated vegetarian and health nut who constantly chases after women, married or otherwise, and gambles too much. With his charm and exotic good looks, he usually gets them, yet he still claims that Garrett has an easier time attracting young ladies than he does. He ends up in a romantic relationship with Belinda Contague, the head of the underworld (and Garrett's former girlfriend), violating his rule of not getting involved with a woman crazier than him.

Morley and Garrett, despite their differences, are the best of friends. As the series progresses, their friendship grows stronger, although neither one will readily admit it. As Morley matures, he seems to take more of a role managing his restaurant and less of a role in the world of crime, although he is always up for an adventure with Garrett when the time comes.

Morley Dotes first appears in Sweet Silver Blues, where his debts from his gambling addiction provide a secret motive for joining Garrett's expedition.

=== Tinnie Tate ===
Tinnie Tate is Garrett's on-again off-again girlfriend. She is a short, fiery redhead in her mid 20s with long, straight hair, green eyes, a few freckles, and a very attractive body. She lives in the Tate family compound with her cousin, Rose Tate, and her uncle, Willard Tate, among others. Her relationship with Garrett is often strained by her volatile personality, but they both enjoy the makeup sex they have when they reconcile.

Tinnie Tate first appears in Sweet Silver Blues. In Cruel Zinc Melodies, Garrett introduces Tinnie as his fiancée (primarily to stop her from insulting an attractive sorcerer from the Hill who is showing an interest in Garrett), without talking it over with her first. At the beginning of the subsequent novel, Gilded Latten Bones, Tinnie and Garrett have been living together for some time. However, their relationship is strained because Garrett feels that Tinnie is excessively controlling. They agree to have her mind modified by the Dead Man to remove her obsession for control. Their relationship goes through an informal breakup, and the modification is aborted.

Tinnie finally loses Garrett to the much more stable Furious Tide of Light, who is one of the most powerful sorceresses in TunFaire and a member of the upper, upper class.

== Major recurring characters ==
=== Dean ===
Dean Creech is Garrett's housekeeper and cook. Dean is elderly, around 70 years old, and he watches the house while Garrett is away. He is generally critical of Garrett's lady friends, with the exceptions of Tinnie Tate and Maya Stump, whom he adores.

Dean cooks and cleans, and snipes and grumbles about how much Garrett is or is not working, how he is eating, who he consorts with, or how late he sleeps in the morning. Dean hopes that Garrett will someday settle down with one of his many homely spinster nieces.

Dean first appears in Bitter Gold Hearts.

=== Saucerhead Tharpe ===
Waldo "Saucerhead" Tharpe is a professional thug and bodyguard. He is a friend of Garrett and Morley, and his line of work lies somewhere between theirs—he will beat people up for money, but will not kill for hire. He is a bit slow of thought, but has a deeply ingrained sense of nobility, and once he accepts payment for a job he will see it through or die trying.

Physically, Saucerhead is a remarkably large and ugly human. He is much taller than Garrett's 6'2", incredibly strong, and almost impossible to kill. Though these qualities may imply a bit of ogre or giant blood in his background, Tharpe claims to be of pure human stock.

Although he is typically attracted to small, feisty women, late in the series he falls for Garrett's large friend Winger.

He first appears in Sweet Silver Blues.

=== Playmate ===
Playmate is a black man close to seven feet tall, though Garrett often exaggerates his height as closer to nine feet. He also has colored scars on his face. Despite his fierce appearance, he does not have a mean bone in his body. Playmate owns a stable close to Garrett's house, and he often provides horses and carriages to Garrett when he needs them. Garrett thinks Playmate would make an excellent preacher, but Playmate's dedication is to his stable, first and foremost.

Playmate first appears in Sweet Silver Blues.

=== Winger ===
Winger is a country bumpkin turned thug-for-hire. She is tall (roughly Garrett's height) and attractive, though strong and built like a brick outhouse. Garrett likens her to Saucerhead, but with better teeth and long blonde hair. Winger is impulsive with a penchant for schemes that get her and everyone around her into hot water. Her taste in clothing is atrocious, and she is something of a kleptomaniac. She has about as much of a conscience as Morley Dotes.

Garrett and Winger have a history. Garrett is not entirely sure why he and Winger are friends, but they are, and he counts Winger as one of the few people who would rise up to defend him under any circumstances.

Winger first appears in Dread Brass Shadows.

=== Chodo Contague ===
Chodo Contague is, for much of the series, the kingpin of the Outfit, TunFaire's most powerful organized crime syndicate. He acquires the position following the assassination of the previous kingpin, which is orchestrated by Morley Dotes at the end of Sweet Silver Blues.

Although he is about 60 years old and uses a wheelchair due to an unspecified condition, Chodo is still a very menacing figure; there is a ruthlessness about him that makes even his henchmen seem kind by comparison. As head of the Outfit, he is one of the most powerful men in TunFaire.

Due to several of Garrett's actions, among them saving Chodo's life, Chodo feels indebted to Garrett, but at the same time, Chodo only favors Garrett as long as their goals coincide. At the end of Dread Brass Shadows, Chodo suffers a stroke that seemingly turns him into a vegetable. At the end of Whispering Nickel Idols, he is on the road to recovery. Eventually, he is deposed. Emerging from the ensuing infighting, one of his offspring, Belinda, takes over, using him as a figurehead while consolidating her power in the male-dominated underworld.

Chodo Contague first appears in Bitter Gold Hearts.

=== Crask and Sadler ===
Crask and Sadler are Chodo Contague's bodyguards and right-hand men. They are cold, ruthless killers who follow Chodo's directions to the letter, and both are vicious fighters on a par with Saucerhead Tharpe and Morley Dotes. Although Crask and Sadler often team up with Garrett on raids and stakeouts, it is always an uneasy truce between the parties. Crask and Sadler would as soon kill Garrett as help him if Chodo Contague gave the order.

In Dread Brass Shadows, Crask and Sadler turn against Chodo Contague and, with the aid of Garrett and Winger, they attempt to assassinate him. When Chodo suffers a stroke, Crask and Sadler take over as heads of the Outfit, under the pretense that Chodo is still giving them orders. At the end of Red Iron Nights, Belinda Contague snatches power back from Crask and Sadler, and the two flee TunFaire.

Crask and Sadler first appear in Bitter Gold Hearts, and they die at the end of Faded Steel Heat.

=== Belinda Contague ===
Belinda Contague is the daughter of Chodo Contague. She has black hair, very pale skin, and prefers to wear all black clothing. Despite her choice of attire, she is very attractive.

Belinda suffers from conflicting emotions. Part of her wishes to be normal, so she could be carefree and spend time with Garrett, for whom she has a tender spot in her heart. However, for the most part, she is just as ruthless and cruel as her father. Although she confesses to Garrett often that she wishes she could get rid of this part of herself, she knows well enough that she never will.

Belinda Contague first appears in Red Iron Nights. By Faded Steel Heat, she has secured control over the Outfit in her stroke-incapacitated father's stead, and remains its leader from that point onward.

=== Westman Block ===
Westman Block is first the Captain, then Colonel of the city Watch. Unlike previous, corrupt heads of the Watch, Block is a true champion of law and order, and along with Deal Relway, he establishes the Guard, an offshoot of the Watch that governs the TunFaire secret police. Block can usually be found at the headquarters of the Watch, in the Al-Khar. By the time of Gilded Latten Bones he has become General of the renamed Civil Guard.

Westman Block and Garrett have a mutual respect for one another, although they are not necessarily friends. Block is often willing to overlook some of Garrett's more unseemly actions in exchange for his help in solving difficult crime cases plaguing TunFaire.

Westman Block first appears in Red Iron Nights.

=== Deal Relway ===
Deal Relway, referred to simply as Relway, is a pioneer and advocate of a New Order, where law, order, and justice will reign supreme. He starts out working for the Watch and quickly works his way up to being the Director of the TunFaire secret police. By the later novels in the series, Garrett fears that Relway's influence is starting to approach that of Chodo Contague's, just on a different side of the law. The relationship between Relway and Garrett is tenuous, at best.

Relway is what is known in TunFaire as a "unique", meaning that his ancestry can be traced back to several different races of humanoid. He is short, ugly, and easily overlooked, particularly when in disguise.

Deal Relway first appears in Red Iron Nights.

=== Pular Singe ===
Pular Singe is a ratgirl, renowned as being the best tracker in the city of TunFaire. She is incredibly smart for her species (making her a little smarter than the average human), speaking Karentine (though she has a problem with sibilants) and learning how to read and write. She initially has a huge crush on Garrett, though it tapers off as she gets to know him better. Some ratpeople clans, hers included, list family name first, so her actual given name is Singe. Garrett, though he has no interest in Singe romantically, enjoys having her around, as she is a huge help in his cases and she constantly amazes Garrett with her ability to learn and mature. She lives in his house and gradually takes over maintaining his accounts and managing his business affairs.

Pular Singe first appears in Faded Steel Heat.

== Minor recurring characters ==
=== Rose Tate ===
Rose Tate, daughter of Willard Tate and cousin to Tinnie Tate, is a black-haired beauty, short but well-built. She is also cruel and self-serving, with a shrewish temperament. Garrett and Rose do not particularly get along, but Morley and Rose appear to have a tryst in Sweet Silver Blues.

Rose Tate first appears in Sweet Silver Blues.

=== Willard Tate ===
Willard Tate is the patriarch of the Tate Shoe Company, and an experienced cobbler in his own right. Despite his advanced age, he possesses a strong business acumen. The Tates are short in stature and claim partial elven ancestry. Known for their craftsmanship, they have built one of the wealthier families in TunFaire. Their large, extended family resides in a joint residential and manufacturing compound.

In Angry Lead Skies, Willard Tate helps fund a manufacturing project spearheaded by Garrett.

Willard Tate first appears in Sweet Silver Blues.

=== Maya Stump ===
Maya Stump was an abused child whom Garrett took under his wing. She becomes a member of the Sisters of Doom, a street gang made up exclusively of abused girls when children. In Cold Copper Tears, she is the warchief of the Doom, but resigns in exchange for the gang helping Garrett during a case.

Her name varies between books: she has been called Maya Stubb, Maya Stuub, and Maya Stump. There seems no significance to those variations, which are probably just auctorial carelessness.

Garrett and Maya are good friends, and Maya is one of the few women Dean approves of as a match for Garrett, although he is uncertain due to her age. Maya eventually breaks off her and Garrett's relationship because Garrett is unwilling to commit to her. In Cruel Zinc Melodies, it is mentioned that Maya has settled down and gotten married.

Maya Stump first appears in Cold Copper Tears.

=== Max Weider ===
Max Weider started from nothing and founded a vast brewing empire that supplies TunFaire and is one of its wealthiest residents. Garrett once stopped insider theft serious enough to threaten the business and was then put on permanent retainer to check around every now and again. Max suffers the loss of much of his family in Faded Steel Heat, and dotes on his surviving daughter, Alyx.

Max Weider is mentioned throughout the series, but he makes his first appearance in Faded Steel Heat.

=== Linda Lee ===
Linda Lee is an attractive librarian and friend of Garrett's who works at the Royal Library. She is just over five feet tall, with brown hair and big brown eyes. Although there is some attraction between the two, Linda mainly just helps Garrett when he is in need of historical information.

Linda Lee first appears in Deadly Quicksilver Lies.

=== Glory Mooncalled ===
Glory Mooncalled is a mercenary general, initially serving the Venageti, but he is treated so badly that he switches sides. Eventually he turns rogue and seeks to establish his own republic in the Cantard. The Dead Man is fascinated by Glory Mooncalled, and he often tries to predict Mooncalled's next move by playing wargames in his room using hordes of small bugs as markers for Mooncalled's forces.

Although Glory Mooncalled is referenced throughout the series, he only makes a brief appearance in Faded Steel Heat.

=== John Stretch ===
John Stretch, whose given name is Pound Humility, is Pular Singe's half-brother. Although he and Garrett start out on the wrong foot, John Stretch helps out Garrett in his later cases. John Stretch is a community leader of the rat people, and has the unique ability to get into the heads of ordinary rats, communicate with them, see and smell what they do, as well as possibly control them.

John Stretch first appears in Angry Lead Skies.

== Geography and locations ==
=== TunFaire ===
TunFaire is the capital of the kingdom of Karenta. It is a large, sprawling city, home to people and creatures of all types. Some of the areas of TunFaire include:

- Wizard's Reach: The area in which Garrett's house is located.
- The Hill: Where the major sorcerers, wealthy individuals, and war leaders of TunFaire live.
- The Bustee: The poorest and most dangerous neighborhood in TunFaire.
- The Safety Zone: An area where species can intermix without fear of prejudice, created by Morley Dotes and home to The Joy House.
- The Dream Quarter: Home to the major churches and chapels of TunFaire.
- The Tenderloin: A mafia-controlled red light district where anything can be purchased for the right price.
- The Dead Zone: The political area of the city.

==== The Joy House (The Palms) ====
The Joy House is a bar and restaurant in the Safety Zone, owned and operated by Morley Dotes. Morley's henchmen can often be found working the bar. The establishment serves only vegetarian and non-alcoholic fare. Morley lives in an apartment suite on the second floor, reached by a set of stairs near the bar; a speaking tube allows the bartender to communicate with him.

In Petty Pewter Gods, Morley decides to renovate the Joy House, turning it into The Palms, a more upscale establishment that caters to TunFaire's elite.

==== The Bledsoe Infirmary ====
An imperial charity, the Infirmary is supposed to provide medical care for the indigent population of TunFaire. Due to lack of funding, few patients at the Bledsoe receive any medical attention at all. The Bledsoe is also the city's insane asylum. It has been said that the poor conditions are not as much due to financial problems but the corrupt administration. The hospital workers even make money by providing the insane patients for home entertainments.

==== The Al-Khar ====
The Al-Khar is an old, decrepit building that serves as the main jail in TunFaire. It is also the headquarters for the city Watch.

=== Karenta ===
Karenta is the kingdom in which TunFaire is located. Karenta has been at war with another kingdom, Venageta, for over a hundred years. Partway through the series, this war ends in Karentan victory, leading to unrest in the city of TunFaire.

=== The Cantard ===
The Cantard is a huge geographical region eight hundred miles to the south of TunFaire. The Cantard contains the majority of the world's silver mines (in Garrett's world silver is a necessary material for the working of magic), which has led to a generations-long war between Karenta and Venageta. Most of the countryside is desert, while the coastal fringe is hemmed by swampy islands.

== Law and disorder ==
=== The Watch ===
The Watch is the police force of the city of TunFaire. The Watch is notoriously slow to respond to incidents and is extremely corrupt. Later in the series, the Watch undergoes a major overhaul when Westman Block and Deal Relway take over, turning it into a well-oiled machine for law and order over the course of a few novels. Block and Relway are supported in their efforts by Prince Rupert, bringing further legitimacy to the unit, which is renamed the Civil Guard by the time of Gilded Latten Bones.

=== The Outfit ===
The Outfit is a name for the human organized crime syndicate in TunFaire. (Other races have their own criminal organizations.) The Outfit owns the Tenderloin and has business ventures in other parts of the city. The "kingpin" is killed in Sweet Silver Blues, arranged by Morley Dotes, and Chodo Contague takes command of the Outfit, until he is incapacitated and replaced by his daughter, Belinda.

== Races ==
=== Intelligent ===
- Breeds - individuals of mixed racial backgrounds; short for half-breeds.
- Centaurs
- Dwarves
- Elves
- Fairies
- Grolls - A mixture of troll and giant.
- Humans
- Loghyr - An extremely rare race of long-lived humanoids with advanced mental powers including telekinesis, telepathy, and mind control.
- Ogres
- Pixies
- Ratkind - A race of large rat people created by sorcery; they perform many of the city's menial jobs.
- Shapechangers
- Trolls
- Vampires

=== Semi-Intelligent ===
- morCartha - a small, winged, semi-intelligent race that mainly lives in the rainforests up near Thunder Lizard country. Slightly larger than a spider monkey, built along similar lines but hairless and red, with bat-like wings instead of arms and with a spade-like point at the end of its tail.

=== Animals ===
- Mammoths
- Rocs
- Thunder Lizards - Dinosaurs by another name, found in abundance in the wilderness. Sometimes kept as guard beasts, or hunted for their thick hides, which make good boot-leather.
- Unicorns - The unicorns are wildly divergent from the usual mythological unicorns in fiction, these are aggressive, carnivorous beasts, possibly created by sorcerers much as are the ratmen. They run in herds under a single dominant male, and hunt using trained dogs.

== Allusions ==
Cook stated that "The Garrett books are all set on the underbelly of Karentine society. Most are mild pastiches of my favorite mystery/detective writers. I'm told part of the fun is trying to figure the influence. So far I've done Richard S. Prather, Robert B. Parker, Rex Stout, Raymond Chandler, and Dashiell Hammett."

=== Allusions to other works ===
- The characters from this series parallel characters from the Nero Wolfe series:
  - Garrett parallels Archie Goodwin
  - The Dead Man parallels Nero Wolfe
  - Dean parallels Fritz
  - Tinnie Tate parallels Lily Rowan
  - Morley Dotes may be named in honor of New York District Attorney Dick Morley.
- There are also similarities to the Travis McGee series by John D. MacDonald:
  - Garrett parallels Travis McGee
  - The book titles follow naming conventions: All McGee books reference a color (e.g. The Deep Blue Good-by and Dress Her in Indigo), while all Garrett book titles include an adjective, metal, and a plural noun (e.g. Sweet Silver Blues through Gilded Latten Bones).
- Garrett is named in honor of Randall Garrett, best known as the author of the Lord Darcy stories.

=== Allusions/references to actual history, geography and current science ===
- According to Glen Cook, TunFaire is loosely modeled after St. Louis, Missouri.
- The character names Tama Montezuma and Marengo North English appear on exit signs 191 and 216 along Interstate 80 in Iowa.

=== Allusions in other works ===
- An "investigator from TunFaire" is mentioned in Wm Mark Simmons' The Dreamland Chronicles.

== Garrett's ladies ==
As with many other stories of this type, the main character is a bit of a ladies man, and frequently loves the women he interacts with on his cases. Throughout the series, his list of girlfriends includes:

- Kayean Kronk - Garrett's first love, rescued in Sweet Silver Blues although their relationship is long over
- Tinnie Tate - Longtime on-and-off girlfriend, beginning in book 1 (Sweet Silver Blues), though it is not until book 3 (Cold Copper Tears) that the relationship becomes explicitly defined. Becomes engaged to Garrett in Cruel Zinc Melodies, but by Gilded Latten Bones they break up again.
- Amiranda Crest - Only appearance in Bitter Gold Hearts - Killed after one night with Garrett.
- Maya Stump - Introduced in Cold Copper Tears, dumps Garrett by Red Iron Nights.
- Eleanor - A woman murdered before Garrett's time. Introduced in Old Tin Sorrows. Some of her essence or soul is present in a magical painting Garrett takes as payment and keeps in his office.
- Jennifer Stantnor - Only appearance in Old Tin Sorrows. Their relationship does not work out.
- Winger - A friend with benefits, introduced in Dread Brass Shadows.
- Belinda Contague - Mentioned in Dread Brass Shadows, first appearance in Red Iron Nights. Homicidal part of the time, she has a significant romantic relationship with Garrett before they end it. Still retains a soft spot for Garrett and respects his expertise.
- Linda Lee Luther - First appearance in Deadly Quicksilver Lies. A librarian with access to reference books useful in several of Garrett's cases.
- Dr. Chastity "Chaz" Blaine - Daughter of Firelord Fox Direheart, appears in Deadly Quicksilver Lies.
- Lila & Dimna - Minor members of the Shayir pantheon, from Petty Pewter Gods. Nymphs who can take the form of owls when they are not pawing Garrett or their faun-like male counterpart. Named from Khalileh/Dimneh from Persian legend, themselves adapted from Karataka/Damanaka in the Indian Pamchatantra stories.
- Imara - Maternal goddess of the Godoroth pantheon, from Petty Pewter Gods. Did not bother asking Garrett first.
- Kittyjo Weider - Ex-girlfriend with emotional problems, appears briefly in Faded Steel Heat.
- Katie Shaver - Staying over at Garrett's at the beginning of Angry Lead Skies. Unusual in that her involvement with him seems completely unrelated to his cases.
- Evas, Fasfir and Woderact - Otherworldly Visitors whose culture has abandoned sexual reproduction, indulging in "research" while they have the chance (Angry Lead Skies).
- Strafa Algarda, aka Furious Tide of Light or The Windwalker, Garrett's first sorceress girlfriend. First appears in Cruel Zinc Melodies; legally married to Garrett as of Wicked Bronze Ambition.
