= The Black Company =

Series of dark fantasy books by Glen Cook

- Cover of first novel in series, The Black Company
- Volumes: The Black Company; Shadows Linger; The White Rose; Shadow Games; Dreams of Steel; The Silver Spike; Bleak Seasons; She Is the Darkness; Water Sleeps; Soldiers Live; Port of Shadows
- Author: Glen Cook
- Country: United States
- Language: English
- Genre: Epic fantasy Dark fantasy Adventure; Hard fantasy
- Publisher: Tor Fantasy
- Published: May 1984–present
- Media type: Print (hardback and paperback)

The Black Company is a series of dark fantasy books written by American author Glen Cook. The series combines elements of grimdark with epic fantasy as it follows an elite mercenary unit, the Black Company, through more than forty years of its approximately four-hundred-year history. Their exploits include battling for, then against, a large empire; navigating persistently untrustworthy employers and internecine conflicts among allies; and surviving several dramatic reductions in their membership rolls.

== Stories ==
=== Novels ===
==== The Books of the North ====
1. The Black Company: May 1984
2. Shadows Linger: October 1984
3. The White Rose: April 1985

==== Spin-off ====
1. The Silver Spike: September 1989 (set after The Books of the North, featuring characters who did not head south)

==== The Books of the South ====
1. Shadow Games: June 1989
2. Dreams of Steel: April 1990

==== The Books of Glittering Stone ====
1. Bleak Seasons: April 1996
2. She Is the Darkness: September 1997
3. Water Sleeps: March 1999
4. Soldiers Live: July 2000

==== Interquel ====
1. Port of Shadows: September 2018 (a "lost history" set between The Black Company and Shadows Linger)

==== A Pitiless Rain ====
1. Lies Weeping: November 2025
2. They Cry: November 2026
3. Summer Grass: TBD
4. Darkness Knows: TBD
5. 5th Untitled Volume: TBD

=== Omnibus editions ===
==== Science Fiction Book Club hardcover omnibus editions ====
1. Annals of the Black Company (collects The Black Company, Shadows Linger, and The White Rose)
2. The Black Company Goes South (collects The Silver Spike, Shadow Games, and Dreams of Steel)
3. The Black Company: Glittering Stone I (collects Bleak Seasons and She Is the Darkness)
4. The Black Company: Glittering Stone II (collects Water Sleeps and Soldiers Live)

==== Tor Fiction softcover omnibus editions ====
1. The Chronicles of The Black Company (collects The Black Company, Shadows Linger, and The White Rose) (November 2007)
2. The Books of the South (collects Shadow Games, Dreams of Steel, and The Silver Spike) (June 2008)
3. The Return of The Black Company (collects Bleak Seasons, and She Is The Darkness) (September 2009)
4. The Many Deaths of The Black Company (collects Water Sleeps, and Soldiers Live) (January 2010)

=== Short stories ===
==== On the Long Run ====
The short stories of the On the Long Run arc all take place within the first four years of the six-year gap between Shadows Linger and The White Rose. They are published out-of-order, as the most recently published stories occur before the earlier three.

1. "Shaggy Dog Bridge"—appeared in Fearsome Journeys: The New Solaris Book of Fantasy, edited by Jonathan Strahan, published by Solaris (2013)
2. "Bone Eaters"—appeared in Operation Arcana, edited by John Joseph Adams, published by Baen (2015)
3. "Chasing Midnight"—appeared in The Best of Glen Cook, published by Night Shade (2019)
4. "Cranky Bitch"—appeared in Songs of Valor, published by New Mythology Press (2021)
5. "Leta of the Thousand Sorrows"—appeared in Keen Edge of Valor, published by New Mythology Press (2022)
6. "Wet Dream Fish Story"—appeared in Bonds of Valor, published by New Mythology Press (2023)
7. "Those Who Went Before"—appeared in Paladins of Valor, published by New Mythology Press (2024)

"Shaggy Dog Bridge" and "Bone Eaters" were republished in The Best of Glen Cook, where "Chasing Midnight" first appeared.

==== Pre-pub novel excerpts ====
Four other short stories were published but later reappeared as chapters within subsequent novels:

1. "Raker"—appeared in the Magazine of Fantasy and Science Fiction (August 1982). This was a pre-publication excerpt of chapter three from The Black Company, with slight editing differences to make it stand alone as a short story.
2. "Tides Elba"—appeared in Swords & Dark Magic, edited by Jonathan Strahan and Lou Anders, published by Eos (2010).
3. "Smelling Danger: A Black Company Story"—appeared in the Subterranean Press anthology Tales of Dark Fantasy 2, edited by William Schafer (2011).
4. "Bone Candy"—appeared in Shattered Shields, edited by Jennifer Brozek and Bryan Thomas Schmidt, published by Baen (2014).

"Tides Elba", "Smelling Danger", and "Bone Candy" were collected and reworked into the novel Port of Shadows.

== Plot summary ==
The series follows an elite mercenary unit, The Black Company, last of the Free Companies of Khatovar, through roughly forty years of its approximately four-hundred-year history. Cook mixes fantasy with military fiction in gritty, down-to-earth portrayals of the Company's chief personalities and its struggles.

The main chronology spans nine novels, which can be grouped into three sections: The Books of the North recount the Company's dealings with the Empire of Lady; The Books of the South follow the Company on its journey back to its beginnings in Khatovar; Glittering Stone sees the Company achieve victory over its employer's enemies, and move on to its destiny. A spin-off novel, The Silver Spike, follows events concerning former members of the Company and one of its adversaries. Port of Shadows, an interquel, describes forgotten events which took place between The Black Company and Shadows Linger. The short stories of the On The Long Run arc all take place during the first 4 years of the 6-year gap between Shadows Linger and The White Rose.

== In other media ==
In 2017, it was reported that a television show based on the Black Company was under development, with David S. Goyer as executive producer. Eliza Dushku was to produce and play The Lady, with episodes airing on The CW and distributed by Warner Bros. Domestic Television. As of 2025, there have not been further updates on the television show's progress.

Green Ronin Publishing published The Black Company role-playing game in 2004. In 2024, Arc Dream Publishing announced their plans to develop a new role-playing game based on the series.
