= The Black Company (novel) =

Military fantasy novel and series by Glen Cook

- Author: Glen Cook
- Cover artist: Keith Berdak
- Language: English
- Series: The Black Company
- Genre: Epic fantasy, dark fantasy
- Publisher: Tor Fantasy
- Publication date: May 1984
- Publication place: United States
- Media type: Print (paperback)
- Pages: 319
- ISBN: 0-8125-3370-4
- OCLC: 11138499
- Followed by: Shadows Linger

The Black Company, released in May 1984, is the first novel in Glen Cook's ongoing series The Black Company. The book combines elements of epic fantasy and dark fantasy as it describes the dealings of an elite mercenary unit, the Black Company, with the Lady, ruler of the Northern Empire.

== Plot introduction ==
The Dominator is an extremely powerful wizard who has the ability to turn his most bitter enemies into his loyal servants, even those nearly his equal in magic. The most potent of his victims are called the Ten Who Were Taken, or just the Taken for short. With his wife, the Lady, whose magical skill is second only to that of the Dominator, he founded an empire unrivaled for evil. It was overthrown by a rebellion led by the White Rose, but neither she nor the rebel wizards were strong enough to kill the Dominator, the Lady or the Taken. The best they could do was to render them unconscious, bury them in a remote, isolated place called the Barrowland and leave guards, both real and magical.

After four centuries, the wizard Bomanz awakened the Lady in an attempt to learn from her. She manipulated him and gained her freedom. She then released the Taken, but betrayed the Dominator, leaving him where he was, and proceeded to resurrect the empire. As with the old, so it is with the new – a rebellion breaks out, spearheaded this time by the Circle of Eighteen. The Circle is made up of magicians not individually as strong as the Taken, but usually united in their goals. The Taken, on the other hand, battle each other as much as they do the rebels.

== Plot summary ==
The Black Company's current employer, the Syndic of Beryl, is losing control of his decadent city to rival factions. A dangerous monster known as a forvalaka runs amok through the city, killing numerous citizens and contributing to the city's growing instability; the Syndic requests that the Black Company track and kill the beast. The creature is virtually indestructible, and it kills several of the Black Company's men, including Tom-Tom, one of the Company's wizards. When the Taken named Soulcatcher offers the Company new employment in the service of the Lady, its Captain readily accepts, though he is forced to arrange the murder of the Syndic to break the contract.

On the march north to the Lady's empire, the Company acquires two new members. Raven is an uncommonly deadly and (usually) remorseless recruit, even by Company standards. Uncharacteristically, he rescues Darling, a nine-year-old mute girl being abused by soldiers affiliated with the Limper, another of the Taken. The Limper and Soulcatcher are deadly rivals; since the Company was recruited by Soulcatcher, that makes the Limper an enemy to beware.

After weeks of trying to link up with the Limper's forces, the Company (at Soulcatcher's suggestion) takes an important rebel fortress, embarrassing both the Limper and Raker, a leading member of the Circle of Eighteen. The Limper sends his top aide, Colonel Zouad, to stir up trouble for the Company, but Elmo, one of the Company's Sergeants, leaks his whereabouts to the rebels, allowing them to abduct him for information. Zouad manages to contact the Limper, but Soulcatcher has other plans. When the Limper cracks open the underground room where his minion is being held, Shapeshifter, Soulcatcher's Taken ally, is waiting disguised as a rebel and unexpectedly stuns him with magic. Shifter then rolls the incapacitated Limper into the cellar and causes it to collapse in on itself. Another victory for the Company, another humiliation for the Limper. While the Limper is not killed, this slows him down for a time.

While the Limper is absent from his post, Raker's troops attack and part of the front collapses. The Company is caught up in the general retreat but shows itself to be the Lady's most effective unit in the ensuing battles. The Captain is given authority normally reserved for the Taken.

Raker is targeted next. The Company's wizards, with Soulcatcher's backing, display a fortune in gold, silver and jewels (protected by magic) in a nearby, neutral city – a bounty for his head. Raker has no choice but to try to steal it before half the world tries to collect. Isolated when he ignores the Circle's order to withdraw, he is eventually killed by Raven and Croaker, but not before his disobedience saps the morale of the rebels in the region.

Retreating once more, the Company stumbles upon and captures a rebel training camp. Papers are found that belong to Whisper, the strongest member of the Circle and a military genius as well. One details a future meeting with the Limper, who is ready to defect as a result of his string of disasters. Soulcatcher, Raven and Croaker ambush them. All the while Croaker has a nagging suspicion that someone is watching them; he later learns it is Silent, a Company wizard. They are captured alive and presented to the Lady. Limper is sentenced to centuries of torture by the Lady.

After the Lady uses magic she learned from the Dominator to gain Whisper's unswerving loyalty, the new Taken is sent to the eastern front. The war becomes a race: the rebel armies in the north, under the overall command of Circle wizard Harden, drive the Imperial forces back towards the Tower at Charm, the headquarters of the Lady, while Whisper runs amok in the east, laying waste to the heartland of the rebellion.

Harden is killed, but takes the Taken The Hanged Man with him. The Circle suffers more casualties, but massive rebel forces besiege the Tower. A daring sortie by the Company captures the wizards Feather and Journey, weakening the Circle further; they are transported to the Tower to share Whisper's fate.

The battle for the Tower begins. The Circle's forces number a quarter of a million while the Lady can muster a mere 21,000. Yet so dangerous are the Lady and the Taken that the Circle delays, hoping to find the prophesied reincarnation of the White Rose to lead them. A great comet hangs in the sky for most of the battle. A prophecy says the Lady and the Dominator will be defeated under a comet's fiery tail. Finally, the rebels are forced to attack without the White Rose before the empire's victorious eastern armies can arrive. All of the Taken gather to bolster the defenses, killing the remaining members of the Circle, when they are not busy assassinating each other. Except for Soulcatcher, all of the original Taken are slain, some by the rebels, but more from internal backstabbing. During the fighting, Croaker observes that Darling seems to be immune to magic. Finally, the rebels are utterly devastated.

Then, with her plot to take over the empire discovered, Soulcatcher flees, but the Lady, with Croaker along as a witness, tracks her down. The physician shoots her with magical arrows supplied by the Lady and then beheads her. Croaker then learns that Soulcatcher is the Lady's own sister. Afterwards, he speculates that this was what the Lady had intended all along: not only to crush the revolt, but also to rid herself of all the treacherous Taken.

During the confusion, Raven deserts because he knows something he does not want the Lady to learn, taking Darling with him. Raven, Croaker and Silent all believe that Darling is the reincarnated White Rose.

== Characters in The Black Company ==
=== The Black Company ===
- Croaker – the Company's doctor and historian. The story is told from his viewpoint. He becomes infatuated with the Lady's persona, attracting her interest.
- The Captain – leader of the Black Company
- The Lieutenant – his second-in-command
- Silent - Company wizard
- Goblin - Company wizard
- Tom-Tom - Company wizard, killed at the beginning of the novel
- One-Eye – Company wizard, brother of Tom-Tom
- Elmo – a Sergeant of the Black Company
- Otto – longtime member of the Black Company
- Hagop – longtime member of the Black Company
- Raven – a new recruit with a grudge against the Limper
- Darling – a young girl rescued by Raven

=== The Empire ===
- The Lady – reputed (by Soulcatcher) to be so cold-hearted, she killed her own twin sister. Wife of the Dominator. Learned the ritual of Taking and therefore can take and empower her own wizards.
- The Ten Who Were Taken
  - Soulcatcher, female – the Lady's sister. She and the Limper are implacable enemies. In an extreme case of sibling rivalry, she also schemes to overthrow the Lady.
  - Shapeshifter, male – the first of the Ten to be Taken. As the name implies, he can assume the appearance of other people (and animals), the better to bring about their downfall. He is Soulcatcher's closest ally among the Taken and hates the Limper even more than she does. He is shown to be fond of infiltrating enemy lines and weakening them from within.
  - The Limper, male – feverishly homicidal and totally lacking in finesse
  - The Howler, male – a small, dirty bundle of rags who howls at random intervals
  - Stormbringer, female – able to conjure storms and cause geological events
  - Bonegnasher, male – eight feet tall, extremely strong and grotesquely muscled
  - The Hanged Man, male – also called Crooked Neck because his neck is stuck in a crooked manner and swollen
  - Moonbiter, unknown gender
  - Nightcrawler, unknown gender
  - The Faceless Man, male

=== The Rebels ===
- The Circle of Eighteen (some are not mentioned by name)
  - Raker, male – the rebel equivalent of the Limper, sharing many of his less desirable qualities.
  - Whisper, female – a military genius, as well as the strongest wizard in the Circle. Later taken by the Lady to replace the Limper after his treachery.
  - Harden, male
  - Feather, female
  - Journey, male
  - Moth
  - Sidle
  - Linger
  - Trinket
  - Parcel
  - Whiskers
  - Roper
  - Tamarask
