= Glen Cook =

American fantasy and science fiction writer (born 1944)

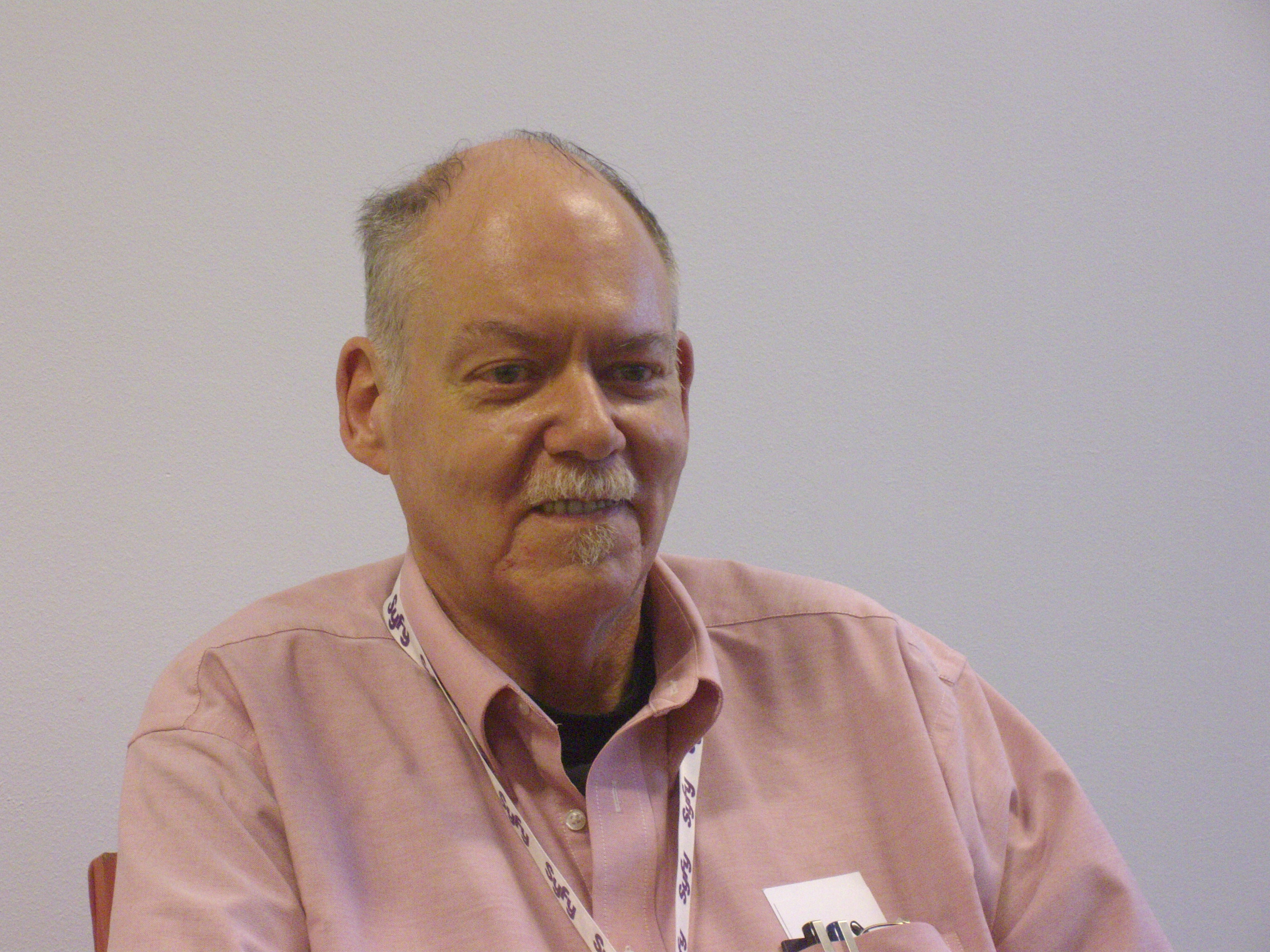
- Cook at Utopiales in 2011
- Born: July 9, 1944 (age 82); New York City, U.S.
- Occupation: Novelist
- Writing career
- Period: 1970–present
- Genres: Science fiction, fantasy
- Notable works: The Black Company; Garrett P.I.

Glen Charles Cook (born July 9, 1944) is an American writer of fantasy and science fiction, known for The Black Company and Garrett P.I. fantasy series.

== Biography ==
Cook was born in New York City. He served in the United States Navy from 1962 to 1972 and specifically was attached, for a time, to a Marine Force Recon unit, the 3rd Marine Battalion. During his time attached to the Force Recon unit, Cook participated in what he called "practice combat", and left active duty, "a month before [the unit] shipped out to Viet Nam". He later worked his way through college. Cook began to write in earnest while working for General Motors at an auto assembly plant in a job which was "hard to learn, but [involved] almost no mental effort", and he wrote as many as three books per year.

Cook wrote The Black Company, a novel published by Tor Fantasy, in May 1984. It began a gritty fantasy series of the same name (or Chronicles of the Black Company) following an elite mercenary unit through several decades of its history. As of 2016, it comprises the novels published in three subseries 1984–85, 1989–90, and 1996–2000, plus recent short fiction. It has become something of a cult classic, especially among current and former members of the military. When asked about the series' popularity among soldiers, Cook replied: "The characters act like the guys actually behave. It doesn't glorify war; it's just people getting on with the job. The characters are real soldiers. They're not soldiers as imagined by people who've never been in the service. That's why service guys like it." Cook is also known for his Garrett P.I. series, which tells the haphazard adventures of hardboiled detective Garrett, and for his Dread Empire series.

== Influence on video games ==
Cook's Black Company novels were among the stated inspirations for Bungie's 1997 real-time tactics game Myth: The Fallen Lords, which the development team cited alongside the film Braveheart. Doug Zartman, one of the game's writers, said the team was drawn to the amoral world of Cook's novels, in which the narrator's side holds no moral high ground over its enemies and betrayal comes as readily from within the ranks as from the opposing army. The influence carried into the sequel, Myth II: Soulblighter, whose story is likewise narrated through the journal entries of a rank-and-file soldier.
