= Las Acacias (Madrid) =

Coordinates: 40°24′5.12″N 3°42′17.77″W

Acacias
- City neighborhood
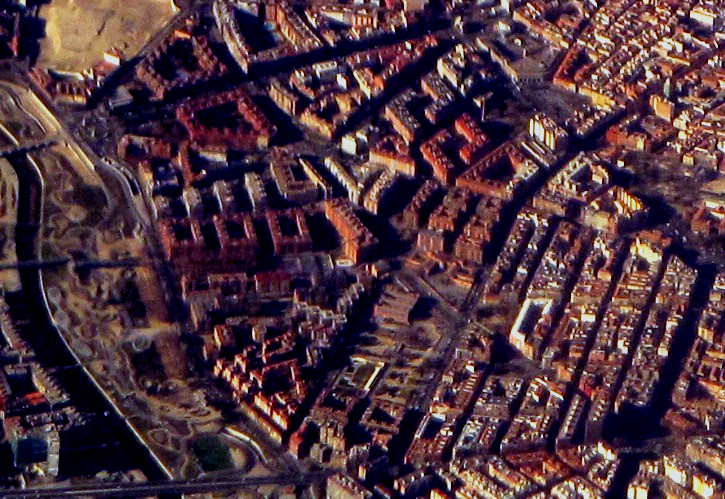
- Interactive map of Acacias
- Country: Spain
- Region: Community of Madrid
- Municipality: Madrid
- District: Arganzuela

Area
  - Total: 1.074172 km^{2} (0.414740 sq mi)

Population (2020)
  - Total: 37,049
  - Density: 34,491/km^{2} (89,331/sq mi)

Acacias or Las Acacias is an administrative neighborhood (barrio) of Madrid belonging to the district of Arganzuela. It has an area of 1.074172 km^{2} (0.414740 sq mi). As of 1 February 2020, it has a population of 37,049.

== Geography ==
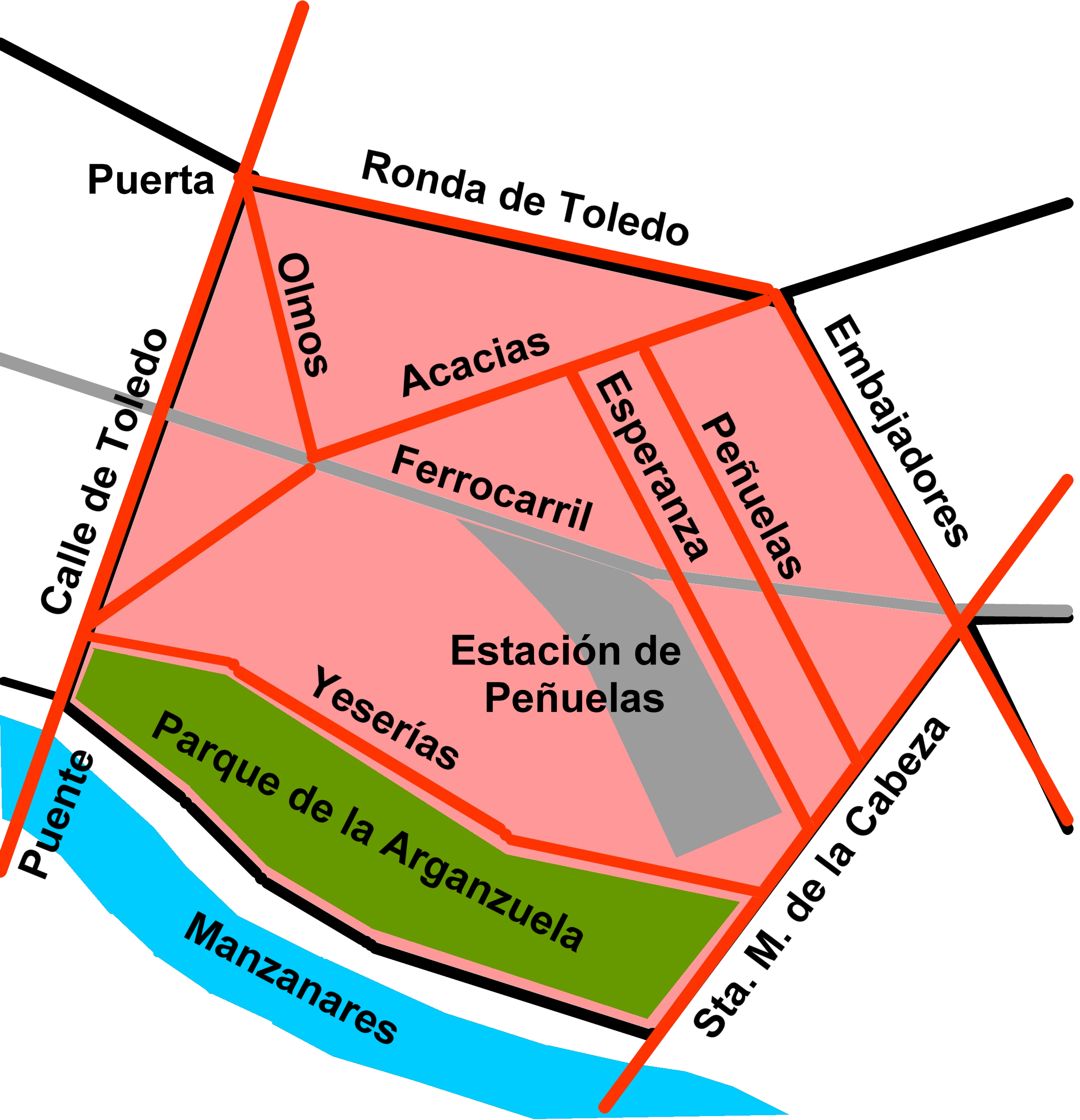
Map of Las Acacias

Acacias is located in city center and is crossed, at its south-eastern borders, by the river Manzanares. The ward has a pentagonal form, bordered by the roads Calle de Toledo, Ronda de Toledo, Calle de Embajadores, Paseo de Santa María de la Cabeza and Paseo de la Yeserías (parallel to the Manzanares), at the entrance of Arganzuela Park.

Acacias borders with the districts of Centro (north-west), Carabanchel (south-east) and with the Arganzuelan wards of Imperial (west), Palos de Moguer (north-east), Las Delicias (a single point in the east) and La Chopera (south-east).

Some important buildings located at its limits are the Bridge of Toledo (Puente de Toledo), between the Paseo de la Yeserias and the Calle de Toledo; and the Gate of Toledo (Puerta de Toledo), between the Calle de Toledo and the Ronda de Toledo.

== Transport ==
Las Acacias is served by the Metro Line 5 stations of Puerta de Toledo, Acacias and Pirámides. It is also served by the Cercanías (commuter rail) stations of Pirámides and Embajadores.

== Photogallery ==
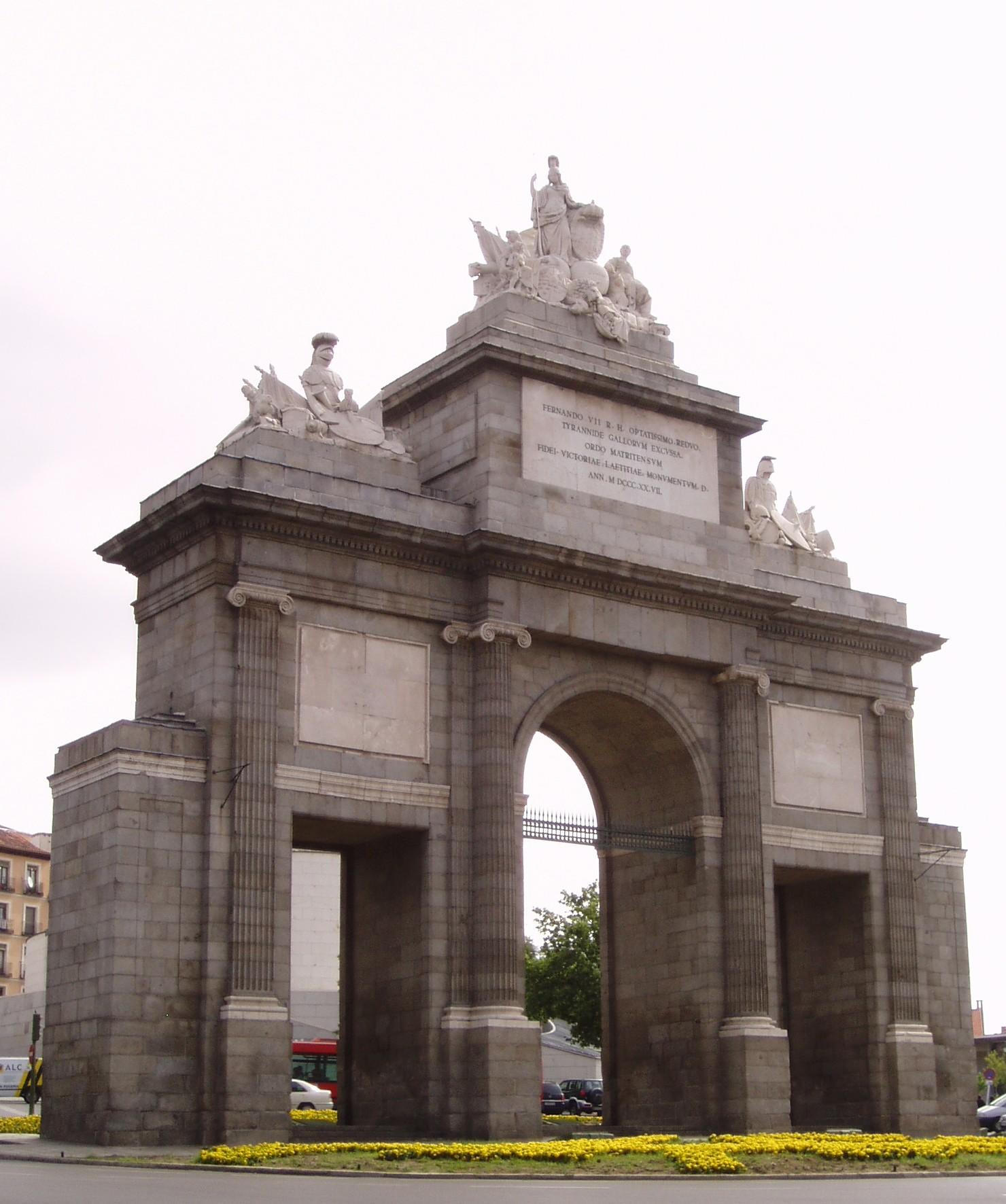
The Gate of Toledo

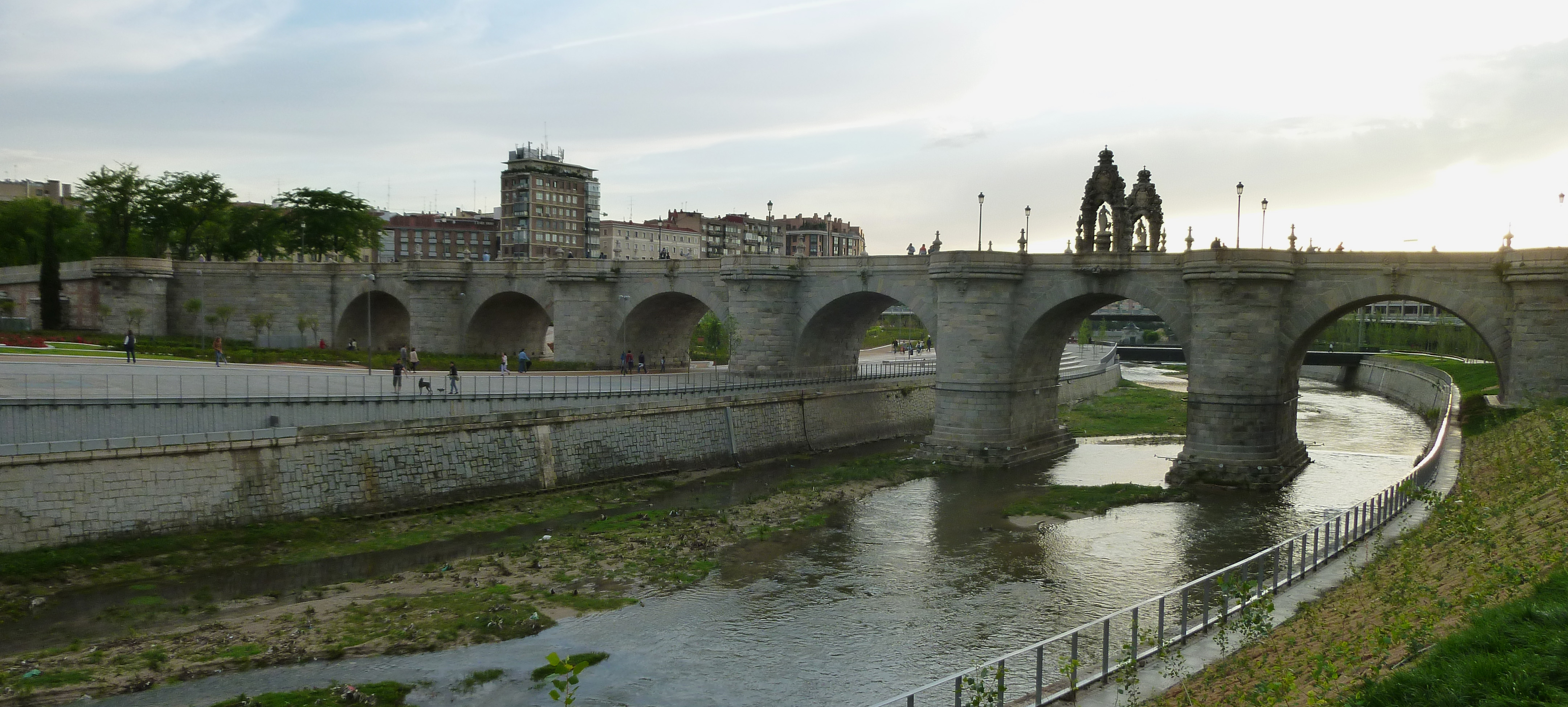
The Bridge of Toledo, over the Manzanares, from Arganzuela Park

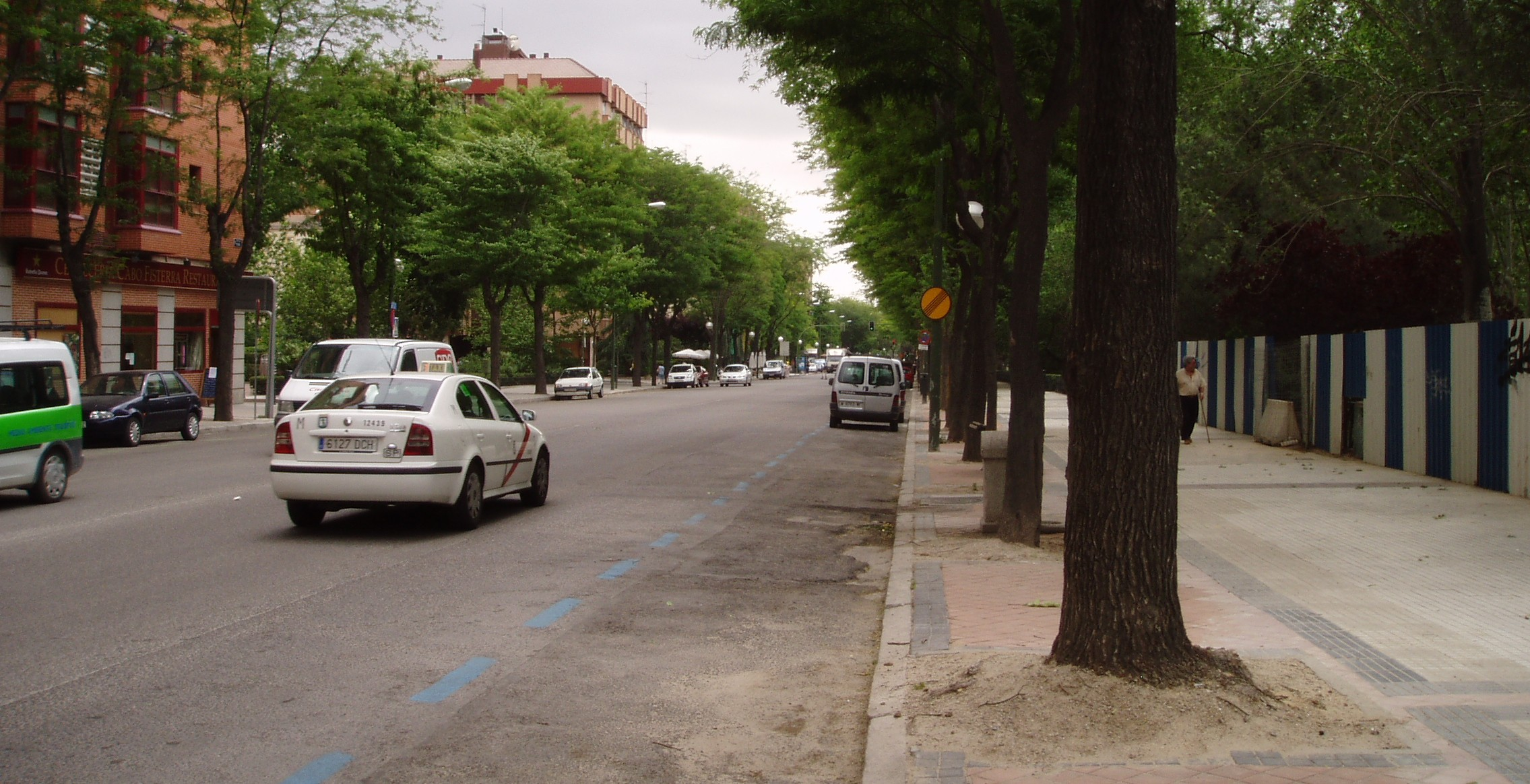
Paseo de la Yeserías

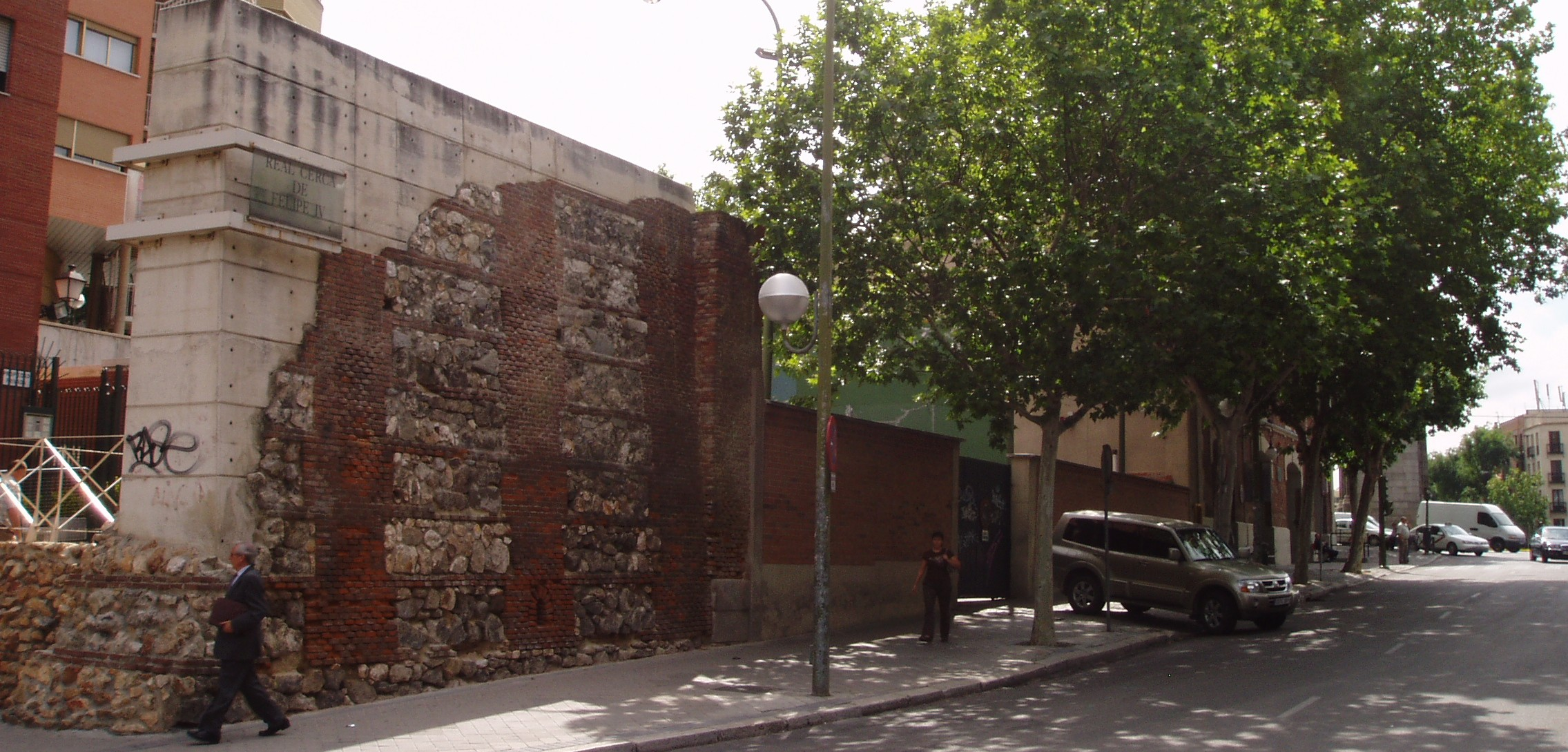
Remains of the walls of Philip IV of Spain
