= Atocha (Madrid) =

Ward of Madrid in Spain

Coordinates: 40°24′2.95″N 3°41′1.25″W

- City neighborhood
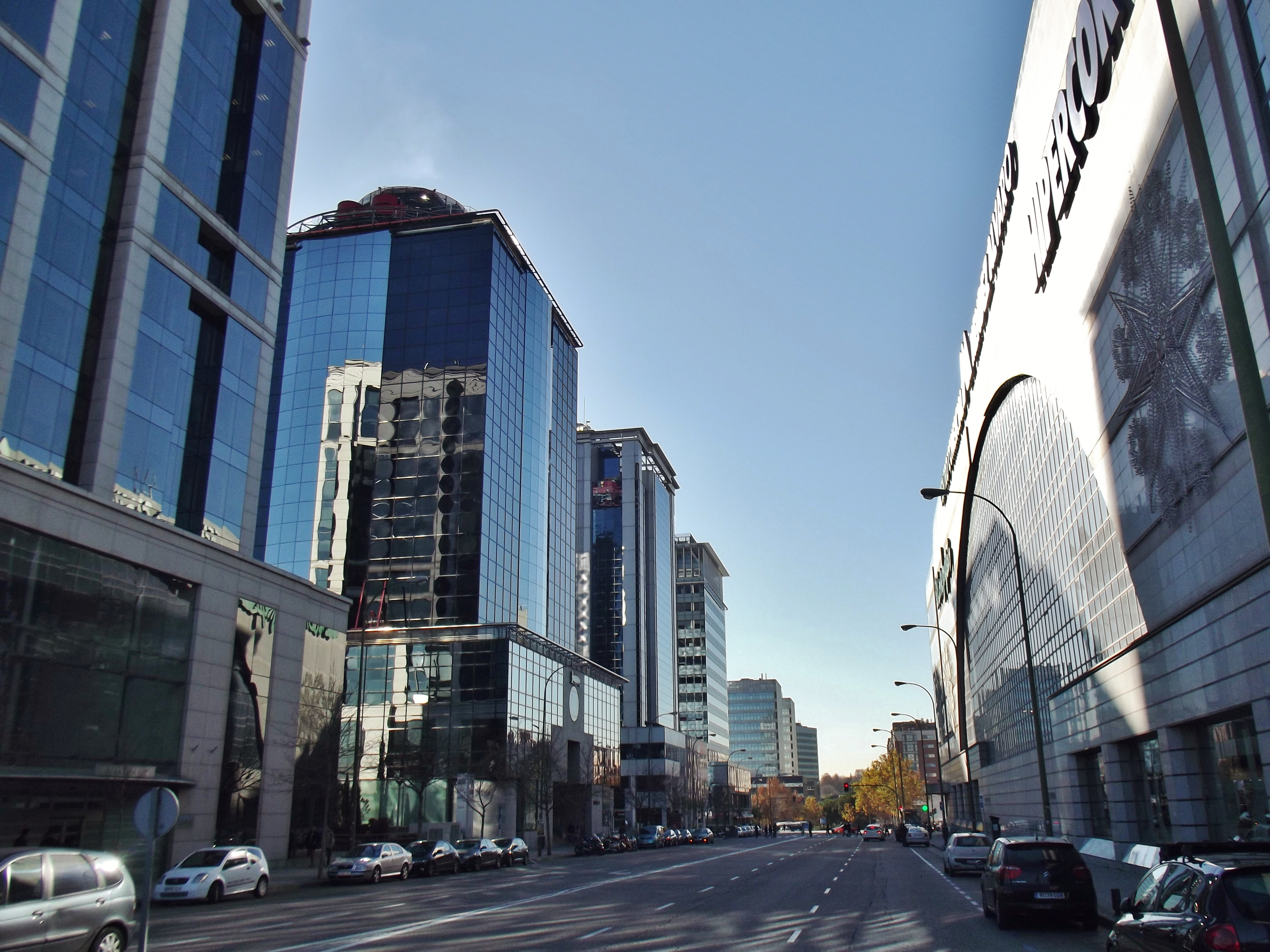
- Calle Retama
- Interactive map of Atocha
- Country: Spain
- Aut. community: Community of Madrid
- Municipality: Madrid
- District: Arganzuela

Atocha [aˈtotʃa] is an administrative neighborhood (barrio) of Madrid belonging to the district of Arganzuela.

== Etymology ==
The Atocha meadow appears as Prato de Thoia and prado de Toia in the 13th-century Madrid town charter. It has been linked to atochar ("esparto field"), the hermitage of Our Lady of Atocha (derived from Theotoca ("Mother of God") or Antiochia) or atochada (an earthwork with grasses to contain water, here applied to a local brook).

== Geography ==
Located in the middle of Madrid, the ward is formed by a strip between the avenue Calle de Méndez Álvaro (south-west), and the north-eastern area of Madrid Atocha railway station, that occupies great part of its territory. The northern border is at the square Plaza del Emperador Carlos V and the southern one in the avenue Calle de Pedro Bosch.

Atocha borders the districts of Centro (north), Retiro (north-east), Puente de Vallecas (south) and with the Arganzuelan wards of Palos de Moguer, Las Delicias and Legazpi.

== Transport ==
Home of Madrid Atocha, the main railway station of the city, the ward is also served by the Metro lines 1 (at Estación del Arte and Atocha stations), 6 (at Méndez Álvaro station) and by several lines of a commuter rail network named Cercanías Madrid.
