= Calle de Méndez Álvaro =

Street in Madrid, Spain

Coordinates: 40°24′03″N 3°41′10″W

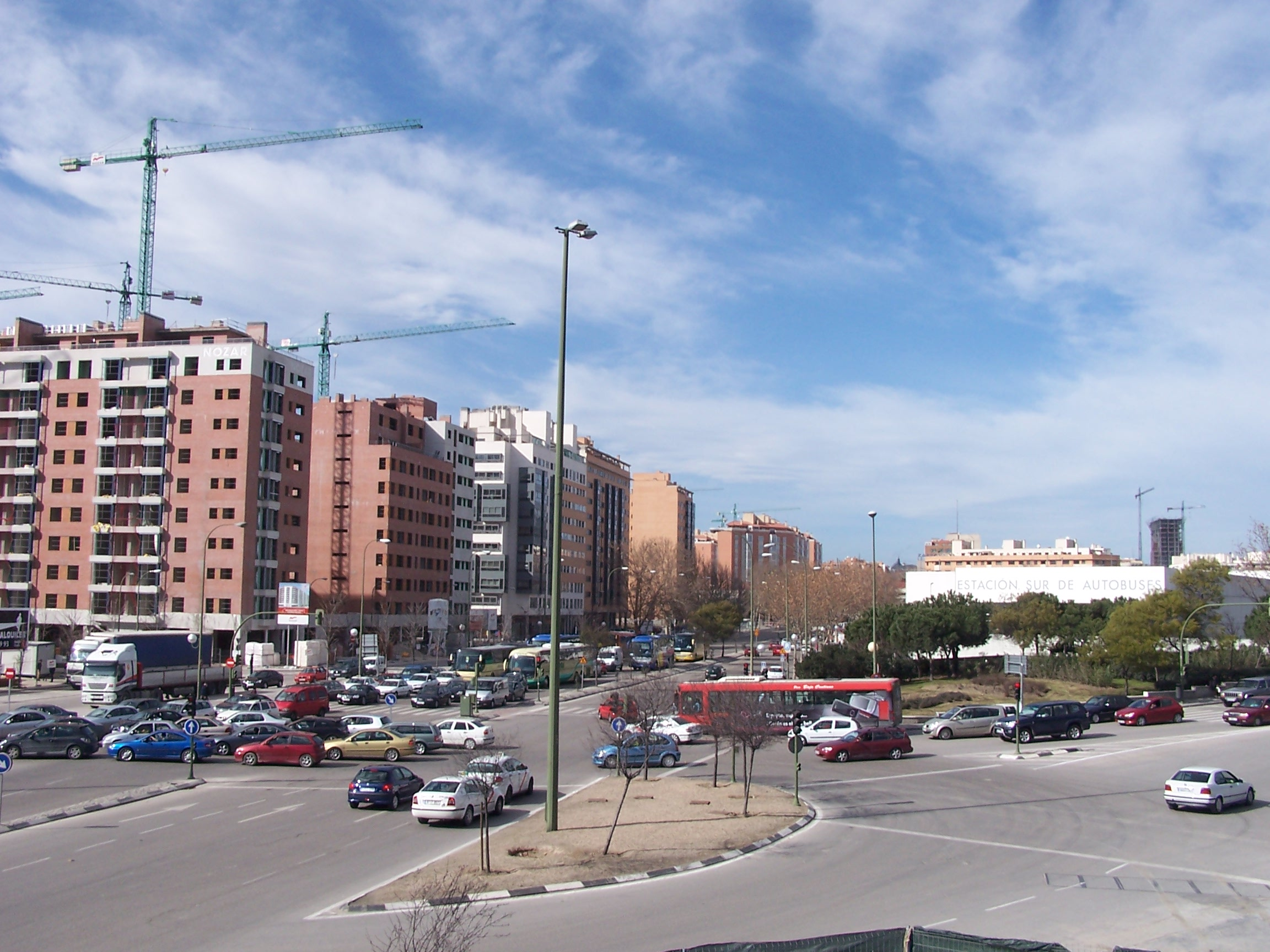
- Interactive map of Calle de Méndez Álvaro
- Type: street
- Length: 1.5 km (0.93 mi)
- Area: Arganzuela, Puente de Vallecas
- Location: Madrid, Spain
- Northwest end: Plaza del Emperador Carlos V
- Major junctions: Atocha, Palos de la Frontera, Delicias, Legazpi, Entrevías, San Diego
- Southeast end: Calle del Convenio

Calle de Méndez Álvaro is a street in Madrid, Spain, stretching between Plaza del Emperador Carlos V and Calle del Convenio. It lies mostly within the Arganzuela district, forming the boundary between the Atocha neighborhood to the east and the Palos de la Frontera, Delicias, and Legazpi neighborhoods to the west. It crosses, via an underpass, the old ring road railway line (currently used by the Cercanías Madrid commuter rail lines C-1, C-7, and C-10) and the M-30 ring road, briefly entering the Entrevías neighborhood of the Puente de Vallecas district. Finally, after another underpass beneath the railway lines to Valencia and Barcelona, as well as those providing access to the Abroñigal freight station, it ends at Calle del Convenio in the San Diego neighborhood. It is named in memory of the doctor, hygienist and former mayor of Madrid, Francisco Méndez Álvaro (1806–1883).

It runs parallel to the Avenida de la Ciudad de Barcelona, from which it is separated by the railway tracks of the Atocha station, and becomes the gateway to Madrid for many travelers, since it houses the South Bus Station, the most important of the long-distance stations in the entire city.

Its intersections include Calle del Comercio, Calle de Pedro Bosch, Avenida del Planetario and the M-30.

== Location ==
Méndez Álvaro Street begins at the Emperor Charles V roundabout (Atocha), passes Atocha station on its left, and continues southwest. It is a two-way street with several lanes in each direction, except for the initial section between Canarias Street and Atocha, which is one-way northbound.

At the beginning of its route, it is bordered on the left by Atocha Station (which has pedestrian and taxi access from Méndez Álvaro), while on the right it receives the streets of the southern expansion that were built: Tortosa, Rafael de Riego, Murcia, General Lacy, Delicias, Áncora, Juan Martín el Empecinado, Canarias, and Bustamante. Next is Mejorada del Campo Street, which facilitates the connection between Comercio Street (which, under the tracks of Atocha Station, forms the extension of Menéndez Pelayo Avenue) and Ramírez de Prado Street, and Plaza del Amanecer in Méndez Álvaro, also on the west side.

Along the west sidewalk, the Repsol's corporate building headquarters can be found. Further south, it intersects with Pedro Bosch Street on the left, shortly before passing under the railway line connecting Atocha and Delicias via an underpass. Beyond the underpass, Planetario Avenue branches off to the right. Opposite, on the east sidewalk, is the South Bus Station. After passing under the M-30 via another underpass, and providing access to Abroñigal Station on its west sidewalk, it becomes Entrevías Avenue.

== History ==
=== Industrial era ===
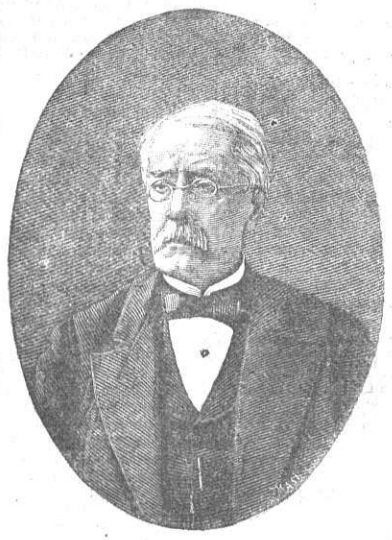
The street was named in 1884 after the doctor, hygienist and mayor of Madrid, Francisco Méndez Álvaro, who had died the previous year.

Méndez Álvaro Street originated as the so-called Yeseros Road, which ran from the Atocha Gate to the right of the Carcabón stream (also known as the Prado or Fuente Castellana stream). Its development began in the 19th century, when the construction of the southern area of the city's expansion was planned . Its first name was Calle del Sur (Southern Street), due to its orientation. In 1884 it received its current name in memory of the doctor and former mayor of Madrid, Francisco Méndez Álvaro.

In the first third of the 19th century, the cemeteries of San Nicolás (1819), a kind of pantheon for illustrious men, and San Sebastián (1824), adjacent to each other, were established on the west side of the road . They were located at the level of the present-day Áncora and Ramírez de Prado streets . Both were closed in 1874 due to health problems, although they did not disappear until 1912. Between 1922 and 1923, the Menéndez y Pelayo public school was built at number 4 Méndez Álvaro street, almost at the Atocha roundabout, and it is still in operation.

The southern expansion project was, however, completely undermined by the construction of the bypass railway linking Atocha and Príncipe Pío stations in 1866 (which crosses Méndez Álvaro Street via an overpass). The new railway line crossed the Camino de Yeseros (Yeseros Road) by means of a grade-separated crossing at the point where the Carcabón stream crossed the road (thus, the overpass allowed passage for both the stream and the road, which continued to the Abroñigal stream, now the M-30 ring road, on the edge of the Madrid city limits). The laying of the railway brought with it a modification of the expansion's layout and a change in land use. Like the rest of the southern expansion area, Méndez Álvaro Street became the site of numerous industrial facilities, of which only scant traces remain. The Central Park of the Madrid City Council's Municipal Cleaning Service was also established there (built between 1915 and 1918 and inaugurated in 1921), still outside the city limits: The chosen site [...] is the so-called Quinta de San José, located at the end of Méndez Alvaro Street and adjacent to the ring road. Due to a breach of contract by a sanitation company, the City Council seized this property and occupied its premises, which are currently managed by this service. Méndez Alvaro Street has no steep inclines and runs in a straight line from the Atocha roundabout to the entrance of the planned park, thus ensuring excellent transport links with the city. Today there are only a few buildings left of the complex, crossed by the Planetarium Avenue (one of them occupied by the Ángel Nieto Museum).

As a consequence of the railway line, Méndez Álvaro Street was left with hardly any road connections in its final section. The Castro Plan envisioned that the new expansion of Madrid would be delimited externally by a "ring road" that, together with the Manzanares River, would complete the enclosure of the new area (this ring road would be the origin of Madrid's second ring road). The presence of Atocha Station and the tracks heading south, as well as the bypass railway, constituted an almost insurmountable obstacle to completing the southern section of the ring road, so the second ring road, which was to intersect Méndez Álvaro Street, was not completed, remaining interrupted at Pacífico Street (now Ciudad de Barcelona Avenue ), where Doctor Esquerdo Street ended.

=== First transformations ===
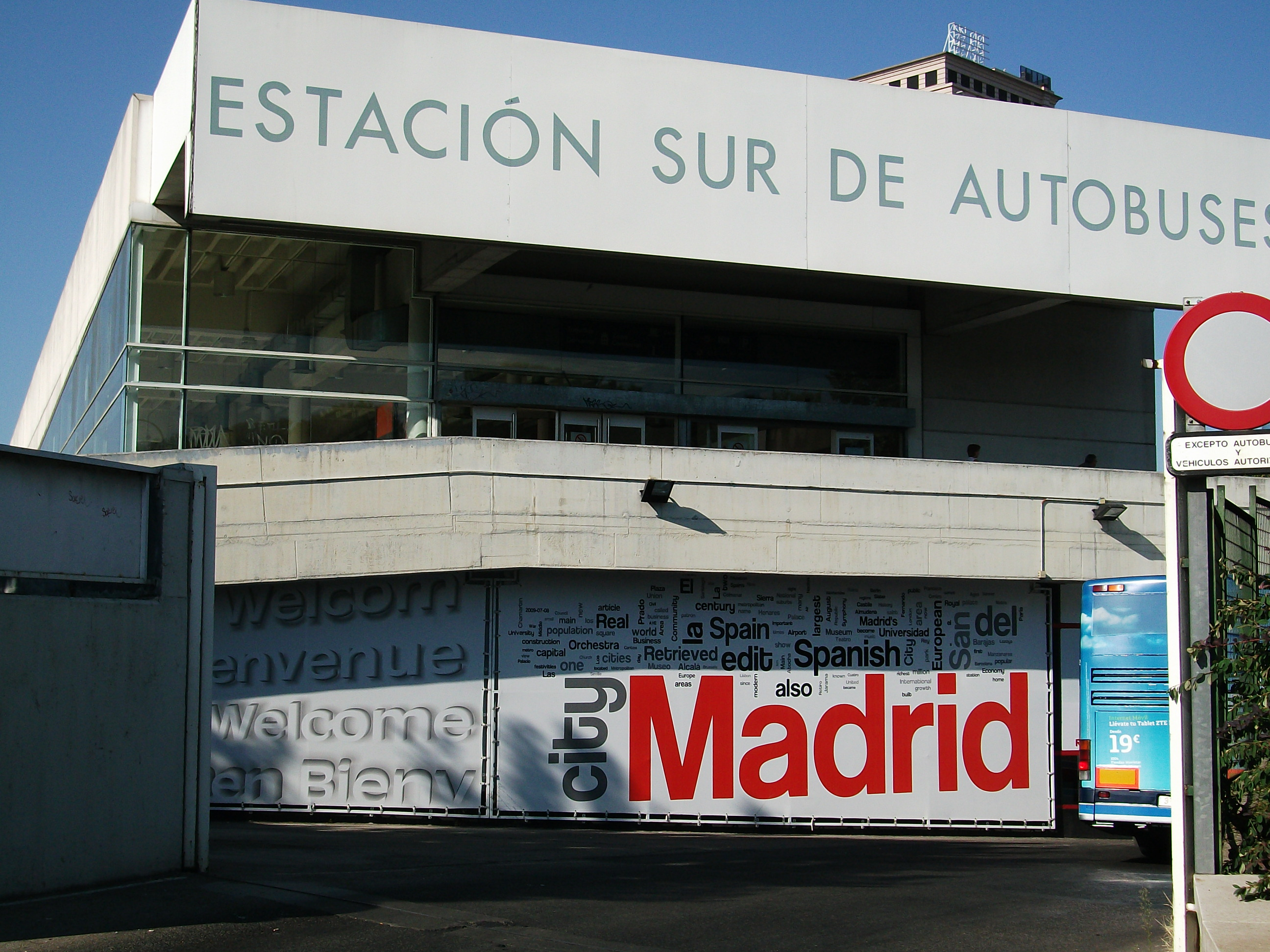
South facade of the South Bus Station, built between 1995 and 1997, replacing the old Palos de la Frontera station.

This situation began to change in the second third of the 20th century. In 1972, a connection was opened between Avenida Ciudad de Barcelona and Calle Méndez Álvaro: Calle Pedro Bosch, which, via an overpass starting from Calle del Doctor Esquerdo, crossed the railway tracks of Atocha station and Avenida Ciudad de Barcelona to connect with Méndez Álvaro. This connection was made to the north of the overpass through which the bypass railway line crossed Calle Méndez Álvaro. The extension of Calle Pedro Bosch to Plaza de Legazpi was already planned at that time, but no measures were taken in this regard.

On November 11, 1974, the Avenida de la Paz (the name given to the M-30 motorway on its eastern route, between the Burgos road and the Manzanares River) was inaugurated. Initially, the intersection with Calle Méndez Álvaro was at grade. On November 30, 1976, the overpass was inaugurated, allowing the M-30 to pass over Calle Méndez Álvaro, which, beyond the motorway, becomes Avenida de Entrevías.

In May 1981, the extension of metro line 6, running from Pacífico to Oporto, was opened. A station, named Méndez Álvaro, was built between Pacífico and Legazpi, located under the intersection of Pedro Bosch and Legazpi streets. Plans had already been made for the metro to connect at Méndez Álvaro with the Cercanías commuter rail line that was to be built between Villaverde Alto and Atocha.

Following the approval of Madrid's new General Urban Development Plan of 1985, new streets were opened, closely linked to the dismantling of the Atocha interchange and the need to alleviate traffic congestion at the roundabout. On March 24, 1986, the tunnel under the Atocha station's railway tracks was inaugurated, linking Méndez Álvaro and Menéndez Pelayo streets via Comercio Street. A few months later, the connection between Méndez Álvaro Street and Embajadores Street was opened via Planetario Avenue, which, thanks to a tunnel, bypassed the obstacle of Cerro de la Plata, where Tierno Galván Park was being built. The connection to Méndez Álvaro Street was made past the crossing with the ring road, in the area where the former Central Cleaning Depot was located.

Meanwhile, the actions stemming from the Madrid Commuter Rail Plan were also going to leave their mark on Méndez Álvaro Street. Although much later than initially planned, in September 1989 a new rail line between Atocha and Villaverde Alto stations was opened to the public, serving Parla and Fuenlabrada, with a stop at Méndez Álvaro, where an underground station was built perpendicular to the existing metro station. A new concourse shared by both stations was then constructed, with access to Pedro Bosch Street.

At the beginning of the following decade, the redevelopment of a large plot of land occupied by former industrial sites began. Located at the end of Méndez Álvaro Street, on its right-hand side, between the street, the M-30 motorway, and the tracks of the Alta Velocidad Española (Spanish High-Speed Rail) and the old ring road railway, the site was developed. On this plot, the South Bus Station (1995–1997) was built, with a façade facing Méndez Álvaro Street; the Méndez Álvaro shopping center, owned by El Corte Inglés, which despite its name was located on Retama Street (opened in 1990); and a series of office towers, most notably Torre Suecia, by Ricardo Bofill, and Indocentro, by the AUIA studio, also on Retama Street, running east from Méndez Álvaro Street, parallel to the M-30.

In the same decade of the 1990s, another urban development project was also going to leave its mark: the Green Railway Corridor, which aimed to reclaim the degraded urban space of the Arganzuela district, a victim of the effects of the construction of the ring railway, which would be buried underground, with the freed-up land being used for the construction of housing and facilities. The line of the old ring railway was doubled to allow commuter rail traffic . For this purpose, a new train station with two platforms, one for each direction, was built at ground level, on a bridge over which the line crossed Méndez Álvaro Street. Lines C-7b and C-10 began operating on this line in June 1996. The two train stations, the metro station, and the South Bus Station were connected to each other, forming an interchange.

=== Usage ===
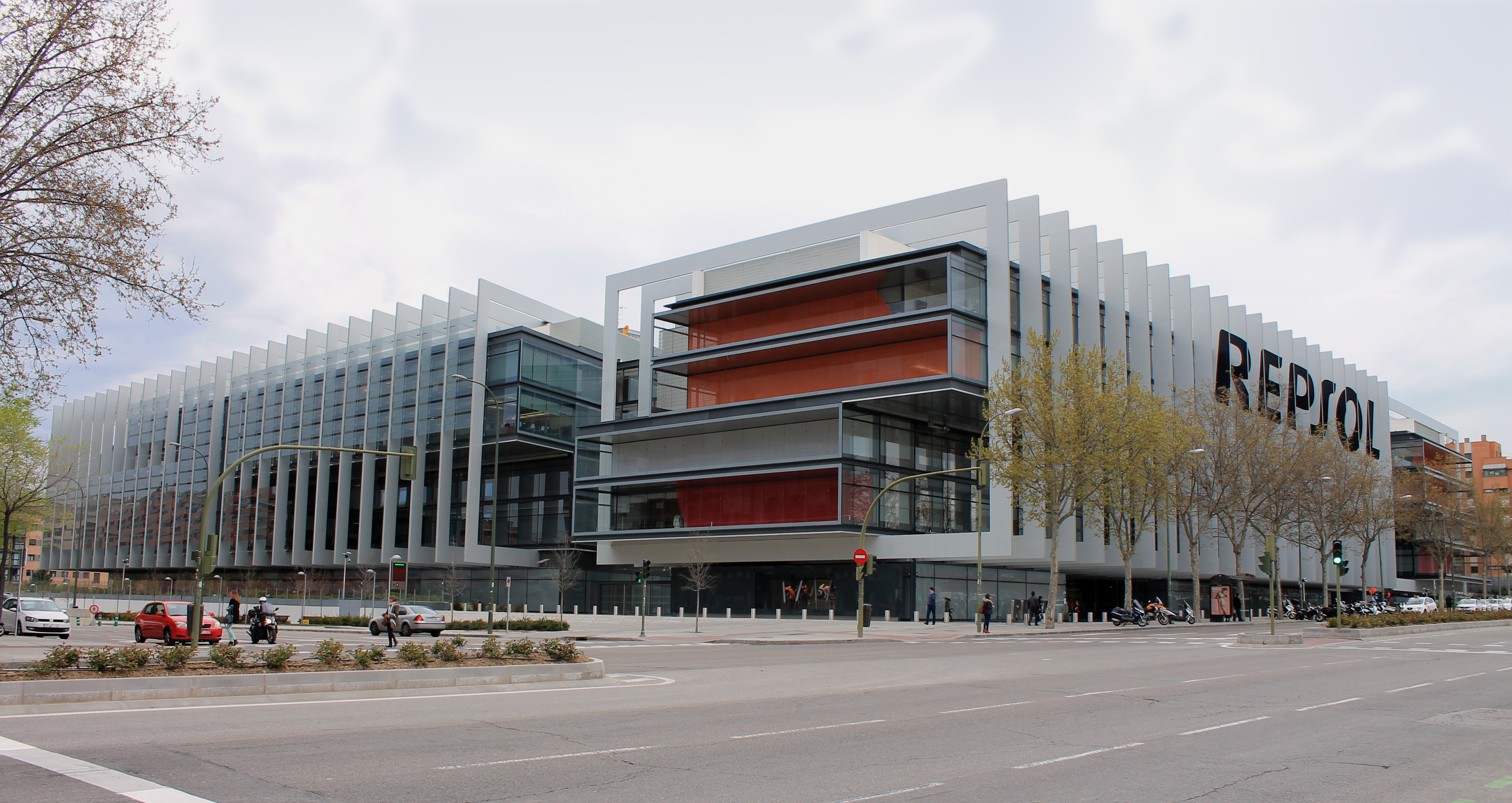
Repsol's headquarters, seen from the odd-numbered side of Méndez Álvaro Street. It was built between 2008 and 2013.

During the 1990s, the dismantling of the industrial facilities located on Méndez Álvaro Street began, and they were replaced by housing and offices. New roads were also opened, allowing for better connections to the street. For example, in 1990, the Plaza del Amanecer was created on Méndez Álvaro, which modified the way Ramírez de Prado Street joined Méndez Álvaro Street.

The 1997 Madrid General Urban Development Plan proposed a strategy for the "transformation of the south [of the city center]" with Méndez Álvaro as one of its axes, aiming to make "Méndez Álvaro Street a main thoroughfare of the urban network" and to eliminate the substandard housing clusters located in its vicinity. Thus, various projects were carried out during the 2000s and 2010s, such as those designated APR 02.06 and APR 02.08 (APR stands for Area of Submitted Planning). The first, called Méndez Álvaro Norte I, aimed to reorganize the area between Méndez Álvaro, Comercio, Tejo streets and the railway yard of Atocha station, an area of urban decay already defined in the 1985 General Urban Development Plan. The action, however, did not begin until 2007 and carried out the demolition of obsolete industrial facilities and substandard housing, relocating the affected inhabitants to an EMVS building known as Méndez Álvaro Norte I.

The APR 02.08, known as Méndez Álvaro-M-30, reorganized the area between the M-30 ring road, Méndez Álvaro Street, Meneses Street, and Planetario Avenue. This took place during the 2000s, following the sale of the Flex factory site located in the area. The project allowed for the construction of residential and office buildings and the creation of new roads (as well as the closure of Villarrobledo Street, which connected Meneses Street with Méndez Álvaro, and which lost half of its route).

At the same time, in 2009, the Madrid City Council commissioned the drafting of a special plan for the area known as Delicias-Méndez Álvaro-Abroñigal. Their recommendations were added to the preliminary draft of the new General Urban Development Plan, published in 2012. Their proposals primarily aimed to increase the commercial use of the plots that had become vacant on Méndez Álvaro Street, as well as at the bus station. They also proposed widening Mejorada del Campo Street to allow for smoother access between Comercio and Ramírez de Prado Streets, crossing Méndez Álvaro.

Furthermore, in 2007 Repsol decided to locate its corporate headquarters in the area, discarding the Repsol Tower in the Cuatro Torres Business Area on Paseo de la Castellana. To this end, it acquired a property owned by the Compañía Logística de Hidrocarburos (CLH) in 2007, located at number 44 on Calle Méndez Álvaro. The new corporate headquarters, a complex of four five-story buildings designed by the Rafael de la Hoz studio, was inaugurated in January 2013. It is the only large corporate center located within the city limits of Madrid.
