= El Imparcial (1867–1933) =

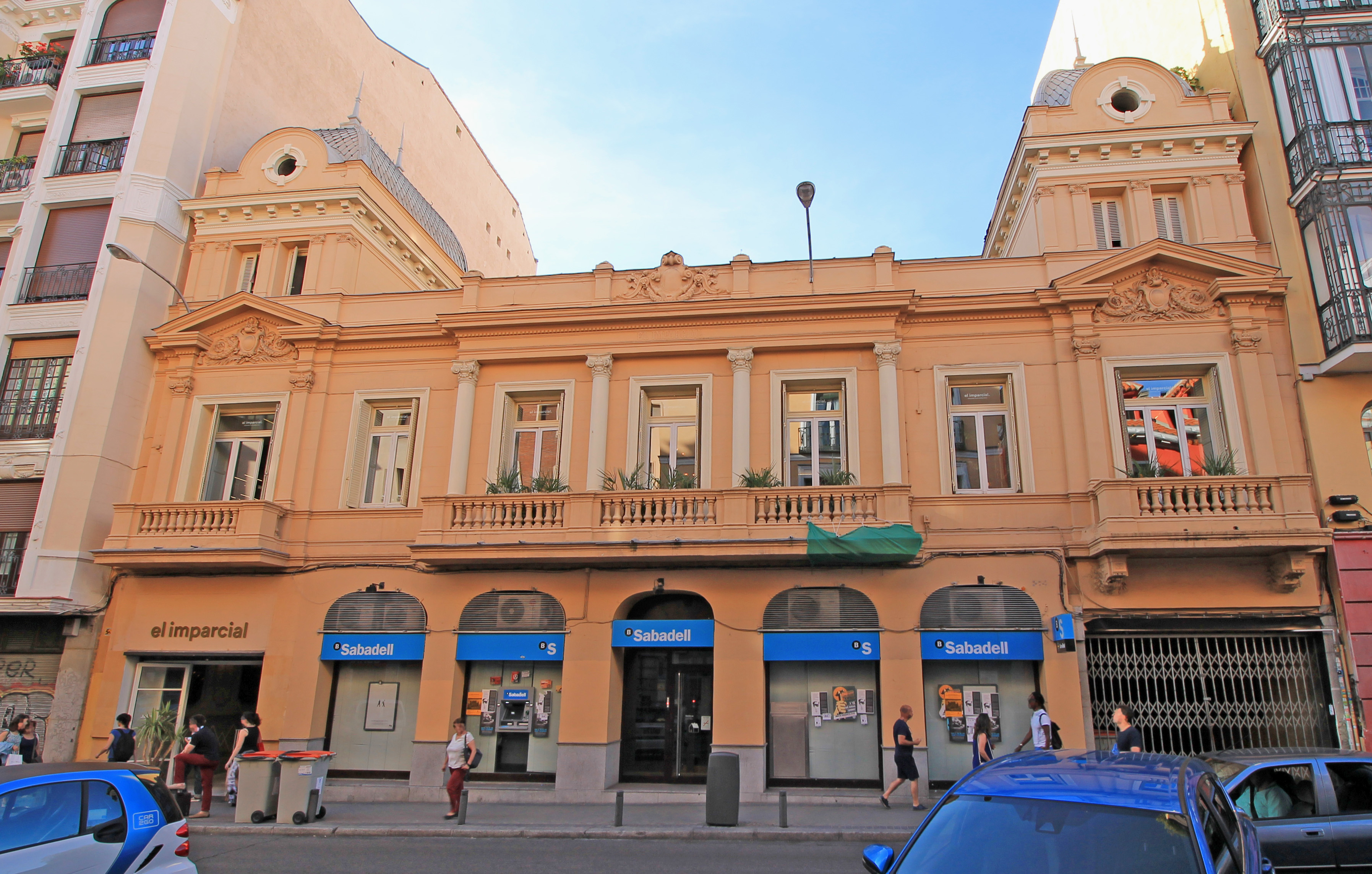
- Former headquarters of the newspaper
- Type: Daily newspaper
- Founder: Eduardo Gasset y Artime
- Ideology: Liberal
- Founded: March 16, 1867
- Ceased publication: May 1933
- Language: Spanish
- City: Madrid
- Country: Spain
- ISSN: 2171-0244

El Imparcial was a newspaper with a liberal ideology published in Madrid, Spain, between 1867 and 1933. Founded by Eduardo Gasset y Artime, it was one of the first newspapers in Spain published by a company as opposed to a political party.

== 19th century ==
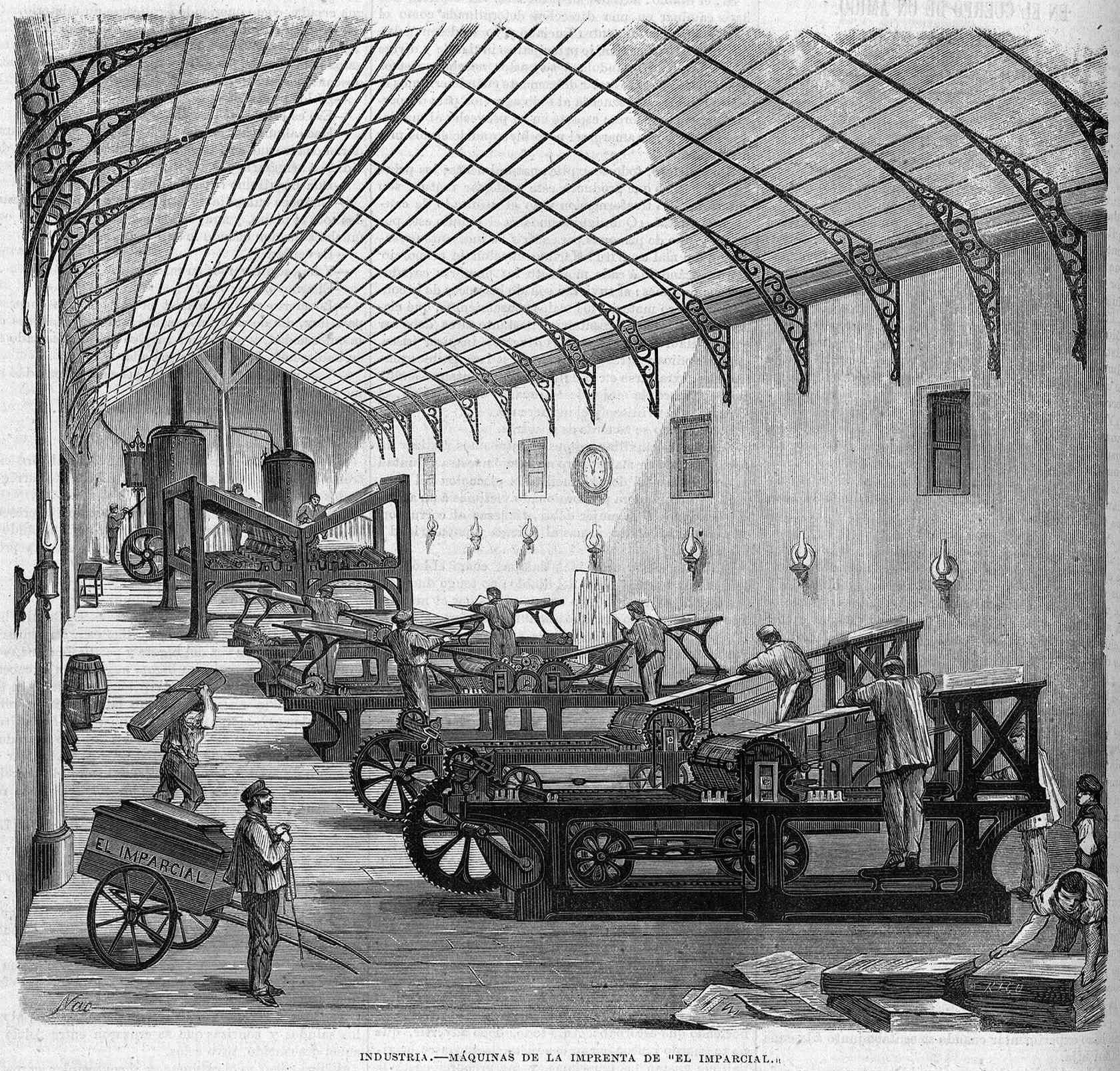
Machinery of the printing press of El Imparcial, drawing by Manuel Nao, published in 1870 in La Ilustración de Madrid

El Imparcial was founded by Eduardo Gasset y Artime on 16 March 1867. It had an initial circulation of 25,000.

By 1890 it had become one of the main Spanish newspapers and, according to the publication itself, "it was sold even in the smallest villages" and "in the kiosks of the boulevards of Paris, in Marseille, Bordeaux, Nice, Rome, Naples, London and Buenos Aires". At the beginning of the 20th century it had a circulation of 130,000 copies.

It was the newspaper with the greatest circulation and influence during the regency of Maria Christina of Austria, but it began to lose prestige due to its political ups and downs, and especially after the appointment of its director, Rafael Gasset Chinchilla, as Minister of Public Works for Francisco Silvela in 1900. After its initial installation on Calle Mesonero Romanos its headquarters were moved to the Madrid building designed by Daniel Zavala Álvarez at 4 Calle Duque de Alba (Plaza de Tirso de Molina).

The Los Lunes cultural section of El Imparcial was the most important in the Spanish language for decades, with the regular collaboration of the senior staff of the Generation of '98: Miguel de Unamuno, Ramiro de Maeztu, José Martínez Ruiz and Pío Baroja.

== 20th century ==
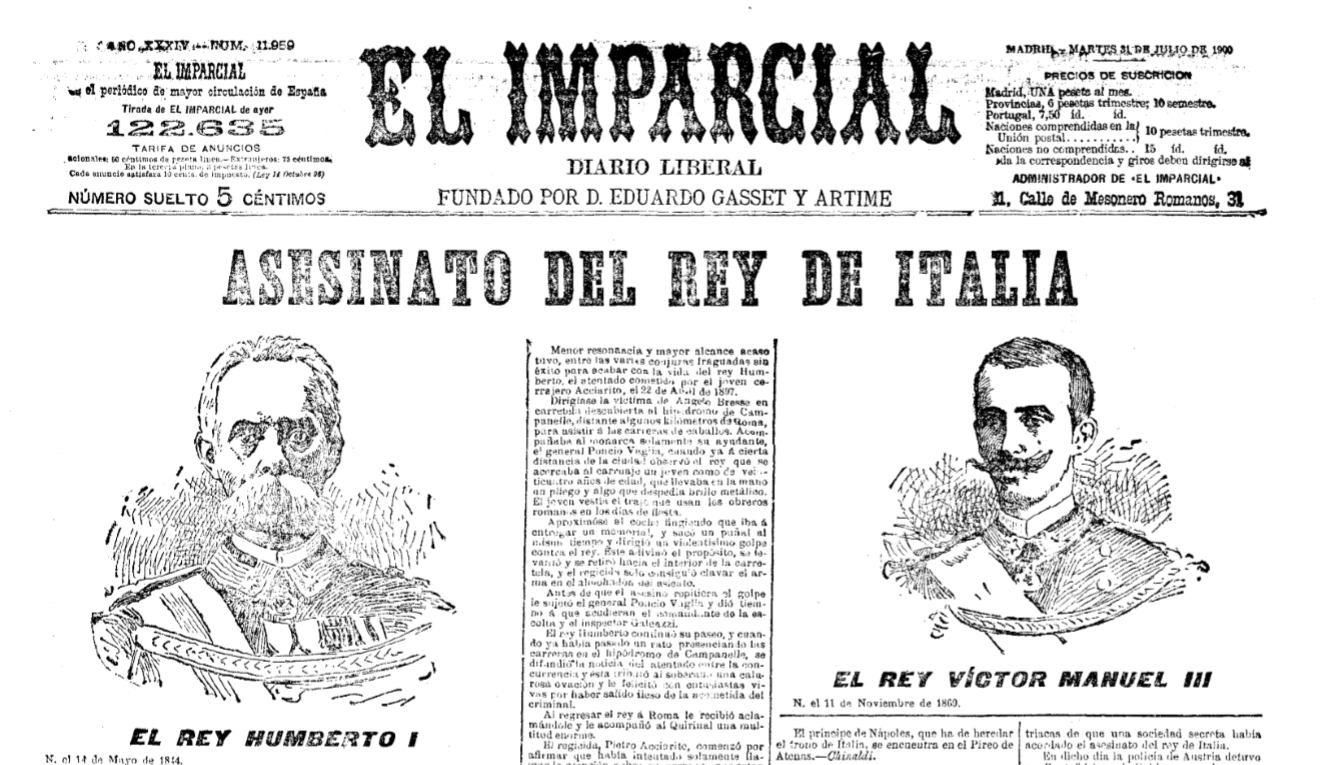
Cover of July 31, 1900, on the occasion of the assassination of the Italian King Humberto I

At the end of 1903 there was an attempt to merge El Imparcial and the illustrated magazine Blanco y Negro, but the attempt failed.

In 1906 the newspaper was one of the founders, together with El Liberal and the Heraldo de Madrid, of the Sociedad Editorial de España, also known as "the Trust." Of the three newspapers that made up the group, El Imparcial was the one located further to the right and with a more bourgeois audience, fearful of labor movements and new nationalisms. "The Trust" became a powerful publishing group. However, in March 1916 El Imparcial separated from the group, since the operation had not been financially beneficial for the newspaper.

The newspaper, again under the control of the Gasset family, did not manage to increase its sales nor did it improve its economic situation. The Gasset family had conversations with the publisher and businessman Nicolás María de Urgoiti, although these did not give any results.

In its last years General Luis Bermúdez de Castro stood out in his management of El Imparcial.

After the proclamation of the Second Spanish Republic, from mid-1932 the newspaper adopted positions close to the Radical Republican Party of Alejandro Lerroux, although from March 1933 it would turn towards monarchical positions. El Imparcial, which in its last years had a limited audience, disappeared in May 1933.

== Sources ==
- Blanco, Carlos; Rodríguez Puértolas, Julio; Zavala, Iris M. (2000) [1978], Historia social de la literatura española (en lengua castellana), Madrid: Akal
- Checa Godoy, Antonio (1989), Prensa y partidos políticos durante la II República, Universidad de Salamanca, ISBN 9788474815214
- Cruz Seoane, María (1998), Historia del periodismo en España, vol. 3. El siglo XX: 1896-1936, Alianza publisher, S.A., 84-206-8178-4/Tomo 3
- Esteve Ramírez, Francisco (1989), "Prensa y movimientos sociales en la última etapa de la Restauración" (PDF), in Ángel Bahamonde Magro; Luis Enrique Otero Carvajal (eds.), La sociedad madrileña durante la Restauración. 1876-1931, vol. II, Madrid: Consejería de Cultura de la Comunidad de Madrid, pp. 333–343, ISBN 84-86635-10-1
- Martínez, Jesús A. (2001), Historia de la edición en España, 1836-1936, Madrid: Marcial Pons Historia
- Root, Regina A. (2010), Couture and Consensus. Fashion and Politics in Postcolonial Argentina, Regents of the University of Minnesota, ISBN 978-0-8166-4793-4
- Sáiz, María Dolores; Seoane, María Cruz (1996), Historia del periodismo en España 3. El Siglo XX: 1898-1936, Alianza publisher
