= Vicente Pastor =

Vicente Pastor may refer to:

- Vicente Pastor (bullfighter) (1879–1966), Spanish bullfighter
- Vicente Pastor (footballer) (1902–1939), Spanish sports leader and founder of Hércules CF
