= Calle de Atocha =

Street in Madrid, Spain

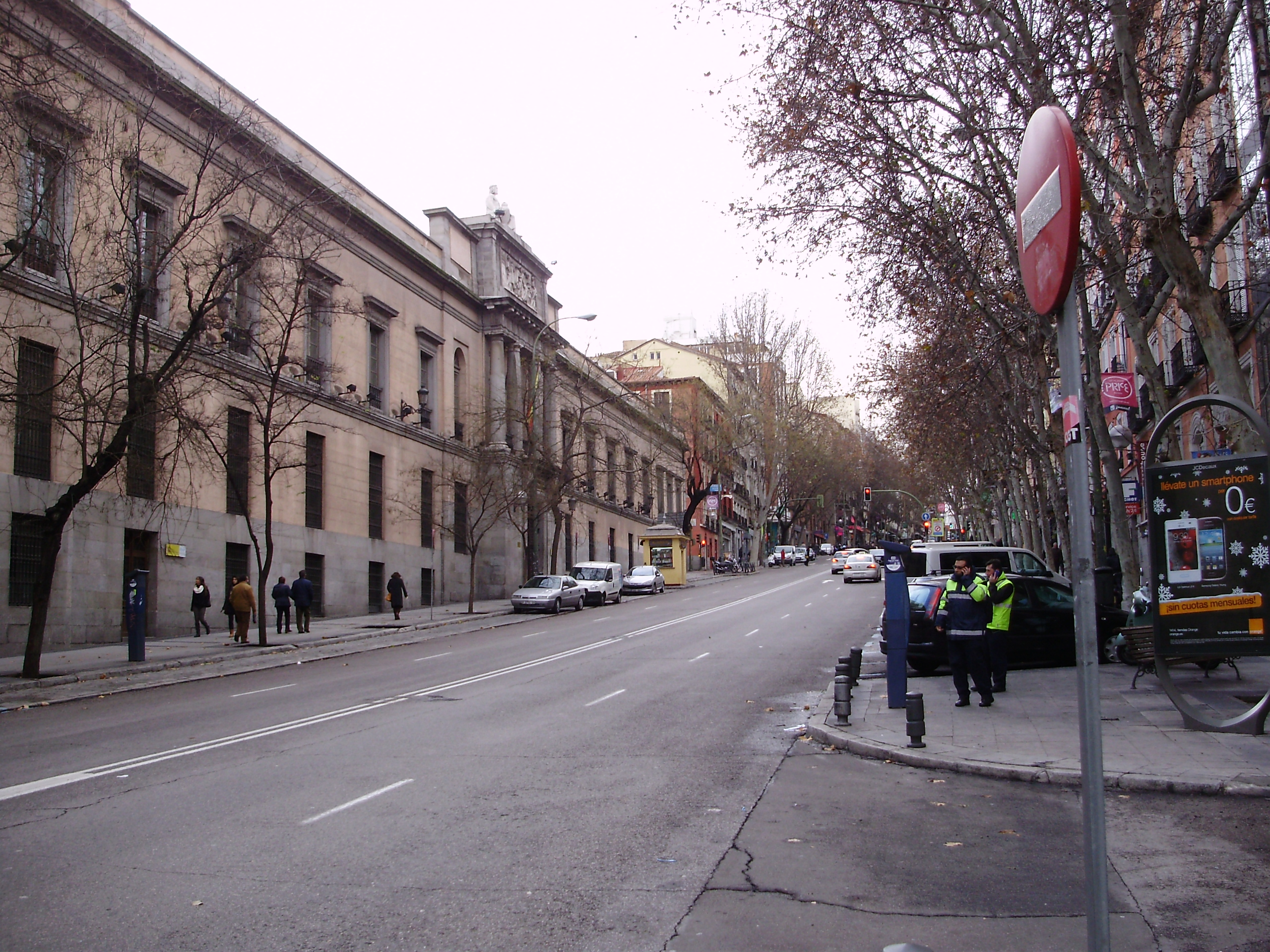
- Type: street
- Length: 1.3 km (0.81 mi)
- Location: Madrid, Spain
- Northwest end: Plaza de Santa Cruz
- Southeast end: Plaza del Emperador Carlos V

The Calle de Atocha is a street in Madrid, Spain. It constitutes a major axis within the Centro District.

== History and description ==
It roughly defines an axis cutting through the old city town from northwest to southeast, straddling along the border between the current Embajadores and Cortes neighborhoods for part of its total 1.3 km long length. It starts at the Plaza de Santa Cruz, ending at the Plaza del Emperador Carlos V.

Along the initial stretch, closer to the royal palace, chiefly residential housing was erected, with some later conventual additions. Meanwhile, the lower, southeasternmost end of the street was chiefly purposed for Hospital buildings already since the foundation of the Hospital of Antón Martín in the mid-16th century. Linked since ancient times to the Spanish Crown, it was the regular route of the traditional royal weekly ceremonies with the monarchs moving to the Sanctuary of Atocha.

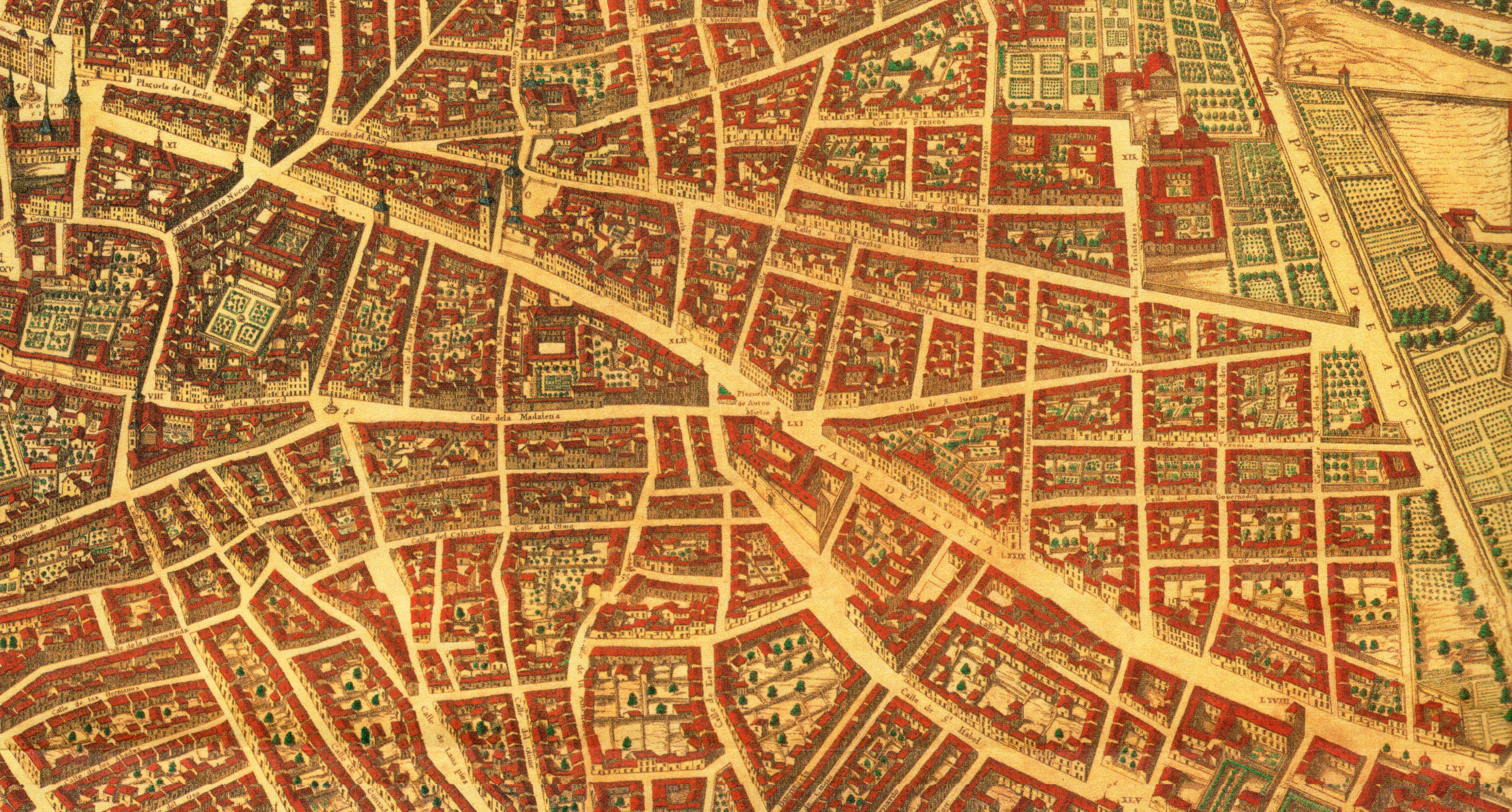
Detail of the street in the Teixeira map (17th century)

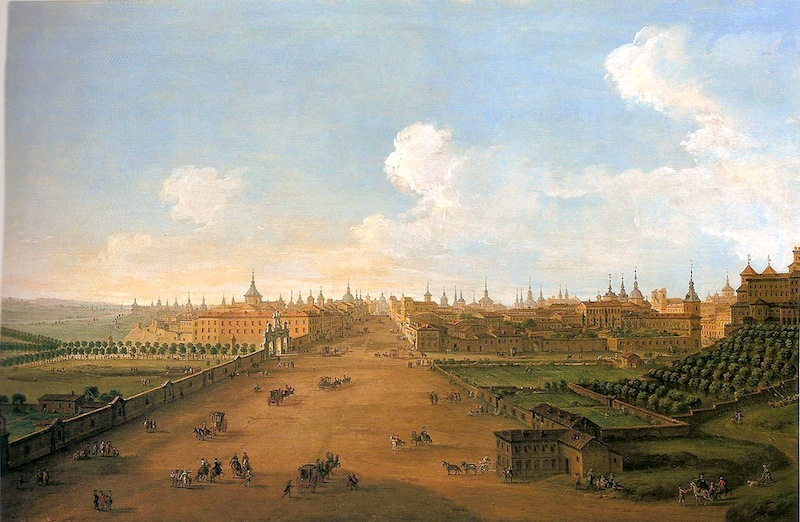
The street as portrayed by Antonio Joli (18th century)

== See also ==
- 1977 Atocha massacre
