= Embajadores =

Ward of Madrid in Spain

Coordinates: 40°24′32″N 3°41′59″W

- City neighborhood
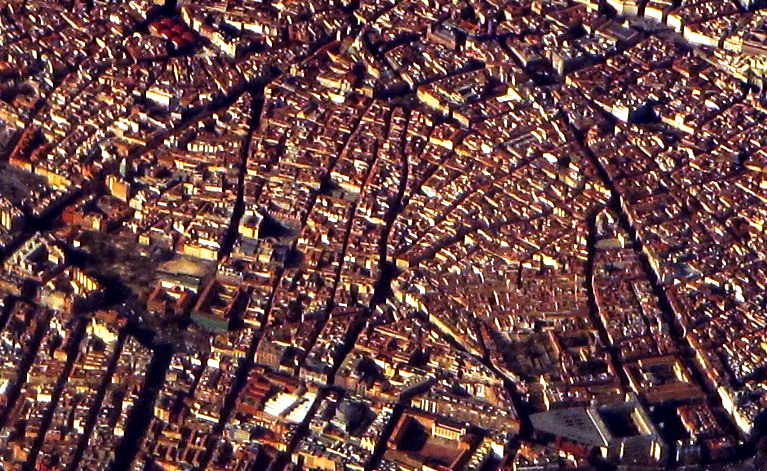
- Interactive map of Embajadores
- Country: Spain
- Autonomous community: Madrid
- Municipality: Madrid
- District: Centro

Area
  - Total: 1.032822 km^{2} (0.398775 sq mi)

Population (2018)
  - Total: 44,604
  - Density: 43,187/km^{2} (111,850/sq mi)

Embajadores is an administrative neighborhood (barrio) of Madrid, belonging to the Centro District.

== Delimitation ==
The area lies in the southern part of the Centro District, the later located in the centre of the city, as its name indicates.

It is bordered by the streets of Atocha, Concepción Jerónima and Toledo, the Ronda de Toledo, the Ronda de Atocha and the glorieta de Carlos V. It comprises the areas of Lavapiés and El Rastro, roughly divided by the calle de Embajadores.

It is 1.032822 km² in size.

== History ==
Originally, the soil on which the current neighborhood was built was a sparsely populated area to the south of the medieval city limits of Madrid. The area fully urbanised to become an arrabal of the city in the 16th century. The urban grid did not evolve much since then; as until the mid 19th century, when the plaza de Tirso de Molina was created over the plot made available by the demolition of the convent of La Merced, no noticeable change happened in the grid.

In 1435, in response to an outbreak of the plague, Madrid shut the city gates. John II of Castile was receiving ambassadors from the King of France. John fled to Illescas in Toledo and for their safety, the ambassadors were led to an area outside the city walls, that area is now known as Embajadores.

== Outline ==
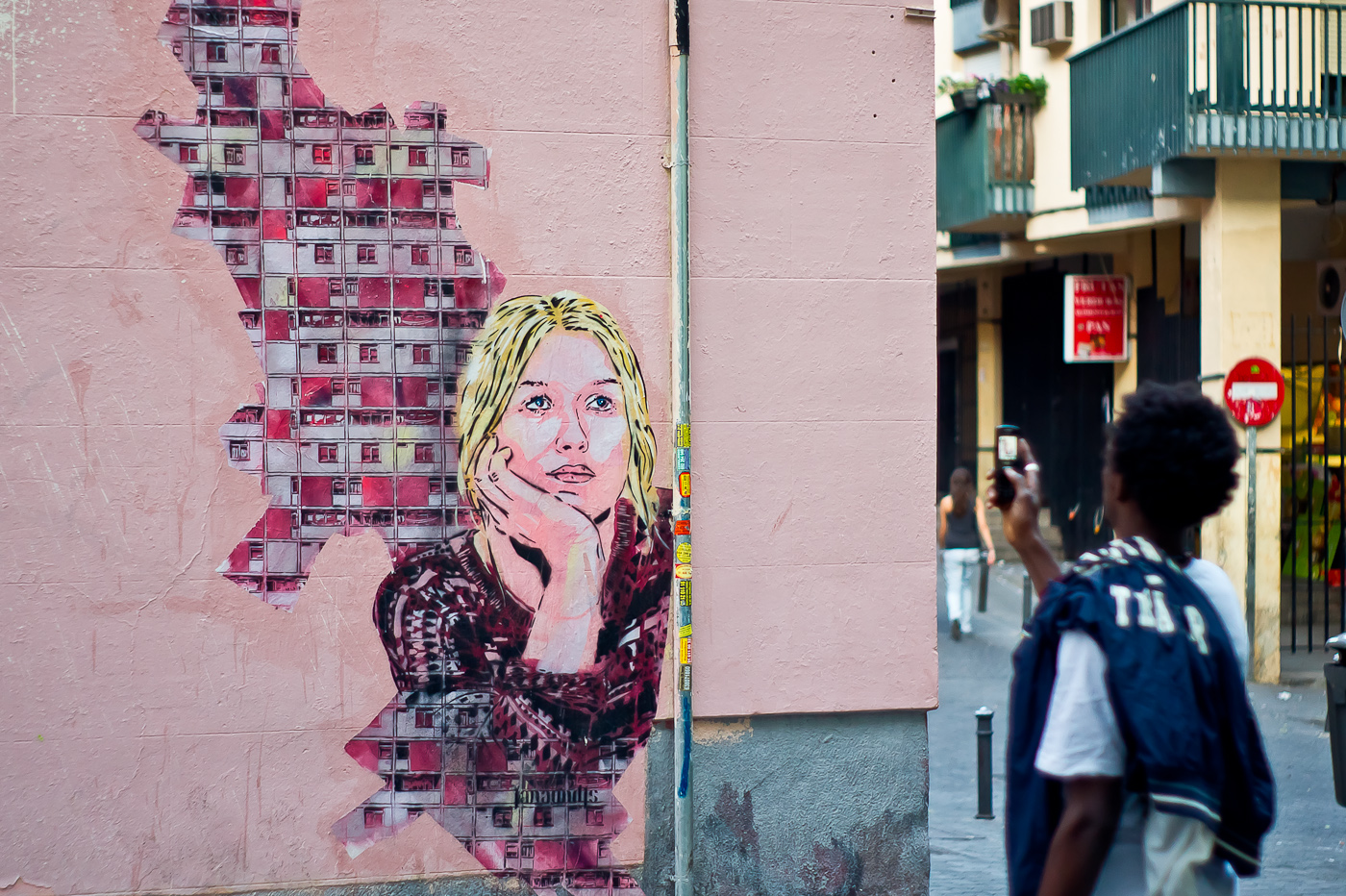
Street art in the calle de Jesús y María.

The Rastro open air flea market takes place in the section between the plaza del Cascorro and the Ronda de Toledo on Sundays. It has a population of 44,604 inhabitants (September 2018). In 2010 the foreign population was a 33,3% of the total population, well above the city average of 17%. Time Out chose Embajadores as the world's coolest neighborhood in 2018.

== See also ==
- Cine Ideal
- Cine Doré
