= Vicente Pastor (bullfighter) =

Spanish bullfighter (1879–1966)

Vicente Pastor Delgado Ruran
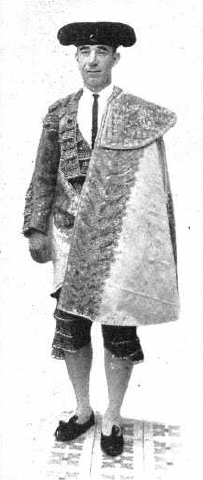
- Pastor as published in Mundo Gráfico on 26 March 1913 on the occasion of the inauguration of the bullfighting season in Madrid.

Personal information
- Nickname: El Chico de la blusa
- Born: Vicente Pastor Delgado Durán; 31 January 1879 Embajadores, Madrid, Spain
- Died: 30 September 1966 (aged 87) Madrid, Spain

Sport
- Sport: Bullfighting
- Position: Matador

Bullfighting career
- Début novillero: 21 July 1912; Sevilla, Andalusia, Spain

Vicente Pastor Delgado Durán (31 January 1879 – 30 September 1966), nicknamed as El Chico de la blusa, was a Spanish bullfighter in the early 20th century. He was recognized for his extraordinary quality in terms of the execution of the passes, and was the first bullfighter to cut an ear in Madrid in 1910, and the third in Seville in 1916, after José Gómez Ortega and Juan Belmonte.

== Early life ==
Born in Embajadores on 31 January 1879, Vicente Pastor studied at the Escuelas Pías on Tribulete street, and in 1891, at the age of 12, he began working as an apprentice in coach upholstery, where he eventually became a journeyman.

== Bullfighting areer ==
=== Early career ===
Pastor saw his first bullfight in 1894, at the age of 15, when he sneaked into the ring, and he was so fascinated by the spectacle that he ended up becoming one of the regulars who jumped into the ring to face the bulls after the official performances had ended. He made his official debut on 24 March 1895, under the alias El Chiclanero, killing a two-year-old calf; the historian Fernando Claramunt stated that this fight occurred "late at night, and in the shadows, and he was applauded", claiming that Pastor "never saw the calves come out, so he did nothing but wait inside his blue suit. They paid him fifteen pesetas for that". That day, he wore a large silver blue smock and a cap, his work attire, a distinctive look that earned him the nickname El Chico de la Blusa ("the boy in the Blouse"), which became widely known, which he kept until he became an alternativa.

Two months later, on 10 May 1895, he officially debuted under the name El Chico de la Blusa, stabbing a young bull. In Seville, he was nicknamed El Sordao Romano (The Roman Deaf Man) due to his rigid and exaggeratedly serious figure, being described as "the culmination of the bullfighter who advances steadily, step by step, and who understood the muleta work as preparation for the death of the bull, being absolutely foreign to the idea of artistic adornment that the public seeks today".

In June 1896, Pastor performed at what was then known as the Vallecas bullring on the outskirts of Madrid, and in that same year, he joined José Bazán and José Huguet to form the Niños Barceloneses team, which toured and fought in numerous bullrings across Spain. On 13 February 1898, he made his debut at the Aragón highway bullring, sharing the stage with Félix Velasco and Antonio Olmedo Valentín, but he was unable to fight the sixth bull due to poor lighting, as a lengthy and dull fight between a bull and an elephant had delayed the event. In total, he fought nine bullfights in 1898, six in Carabanchel Bajo and three more in Madrid, including one as a mixed bullfight where he was required to kill the final two bulls. After several years as an apprentice bullfighter, Pastor finally became an alternativa in Madrid on 21 September 1902, taking the title from the hands of Luis Mazzantini, who gave him the fight and death of the bull Aldeano from the Veragua ranch in a one-on-one event. On the following day, the bullfighting critic "Don Modesto", who had already advised Pastor not to announce himself with the nickname by which he was known in Madrid, wrote the chronicle of the celebration titled: "Death of The Boy in the Blouse. Birthday of Vicente Pastor".

=== Golden years ===
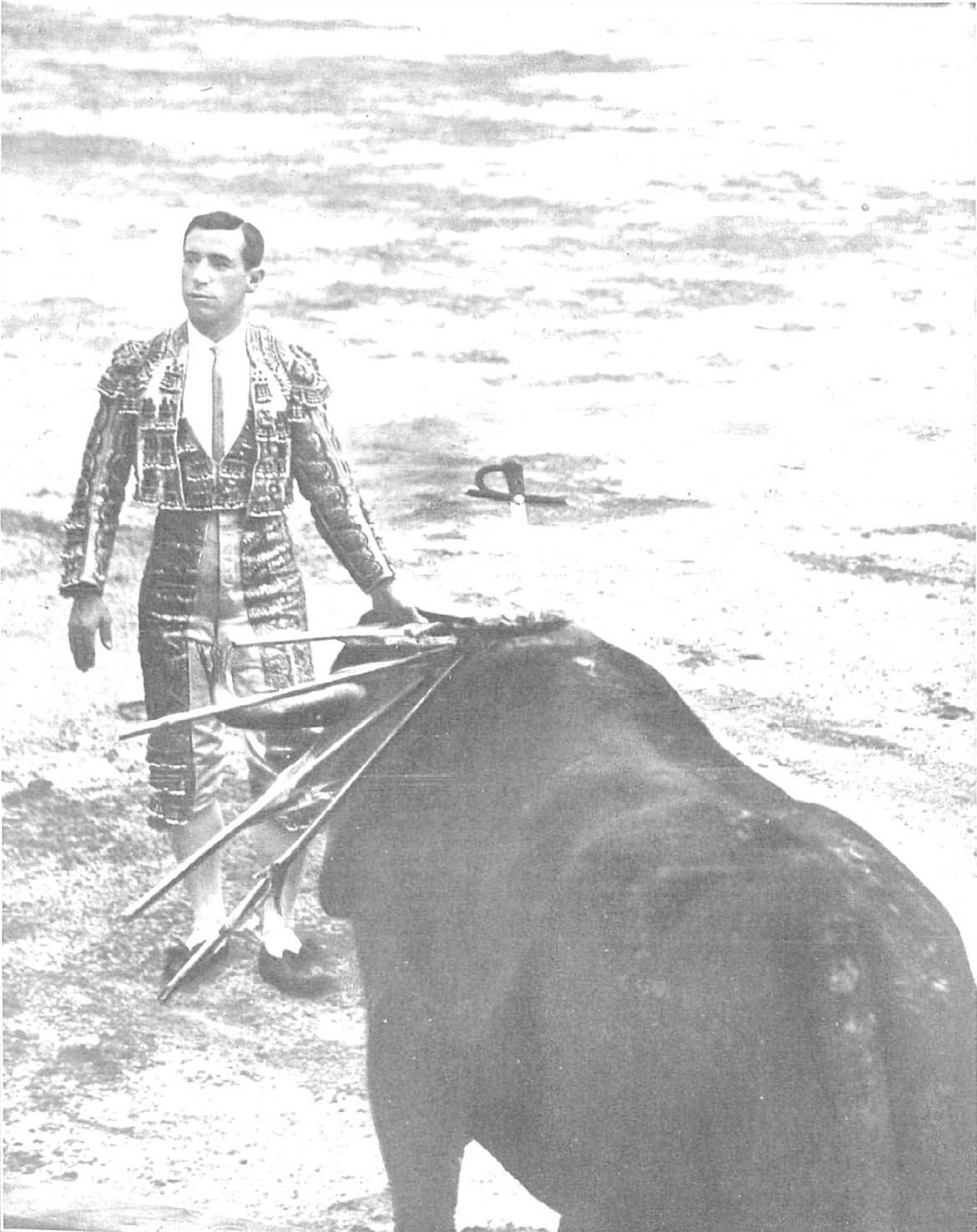
Pastor in 1909.

The next few years, however, proved challenging for him, as he participated in very few events, failing to reach even ten fights per season, but despite having quickly faded into the background, his determination brought him back in 1907. After three highly successful seasons, during which he fought around thirty bullfights, he rose to prominence thanks to his historic performance on 2 October 1910, at the Madrid bullring, in which he faced the bull 'Carbonero', who was wild and uncooperative, but despite this, Pastor demonstrated courage by fighting alone, and also skill by delivering nine precise passes to execute a short and clean kill that left the bull lifeless upon impact; he was then awarded that bull's ear, thus breaking the tradition of not awarding trophies to swordsmen. Historians have noted that such honor had already been granted twice before in that arena, but not in a serious manner.

Even though Pastor's number of fights in Madrid did not drastically increase the following year (ten in 1910 and fourteen in 1911), his reputation as a bullfighter grew significantly, and thus, after years of struggle and relative obscurity, he finally reached the highest ranks of the sport, establishing himself as a major figure in bullfighting. He has been described by Diego "Don" Ventura as "a masterful and conscientious bullfighter with the muleta, he was an idol in Madrid for several years and knew how to maintain his prerogatives with exemplary seriousness and firmness". In the following year, 1912, he had the most brilliant season of his professional life with a total of 56 bullfights performances. That season, on 14 January, he faced six bulls on his own in the Mexican bullring of El Toreo de la Condesa, being seriously injured by the fourth, and later that year, he was hired to bullfight five afternoons in Pamplona, cutting his first ear in that plaza in the last fight, held on 14 July.

=== Later career ===
In 1912, Pastor developed a rivalry with Rafael González Machaquito, fuelled mainly by the many supporters that Pastor had taken away from his fellow countrymen, but he too ended up being a victim of this, with the emergence of José Gómez Ortega and Juan Belmonte, which caused a decrease of fights from 1913 onwards. He tried to compete against the two rising stars of the time, performing well, particularly in a memorable fight on 29 April 1916, in Seville, where he displayed fearless determination, behaving recklessly, in front of the bulls.

On 23 May 1918, the 39-year-old bid farewell to bullfighting, during the Montepío de Toreros charity event, which he had presided over for many years; he dedicated his final bull, Cabrero, to King Alfonso XIII, stating "I offer this toast to the King of Spain, the foremost Madrilenian, to whom the humblest son of Madrid has the honor of dedicating the last bull he will ever face".

== Later life ==
On 3 April 1952, Pastor was the subject of a tribute held in the Plaza de Las Ventas, in which, as a curiosity, the then Real Madrid footballer José Montalvo fought a calf, together with his teammates Luis Molowny, Gabriel Alonso, and Pahíño as his teammates. Seven years later, on 15 November 1959, he was the subject of another festival.

== Death ==
Pastor died in Madrid on 30 September 1966, at the age of 87.
