= Monument to Claudio Moyano (Madrid) =

Monument in Madrid

Claudio Moyano
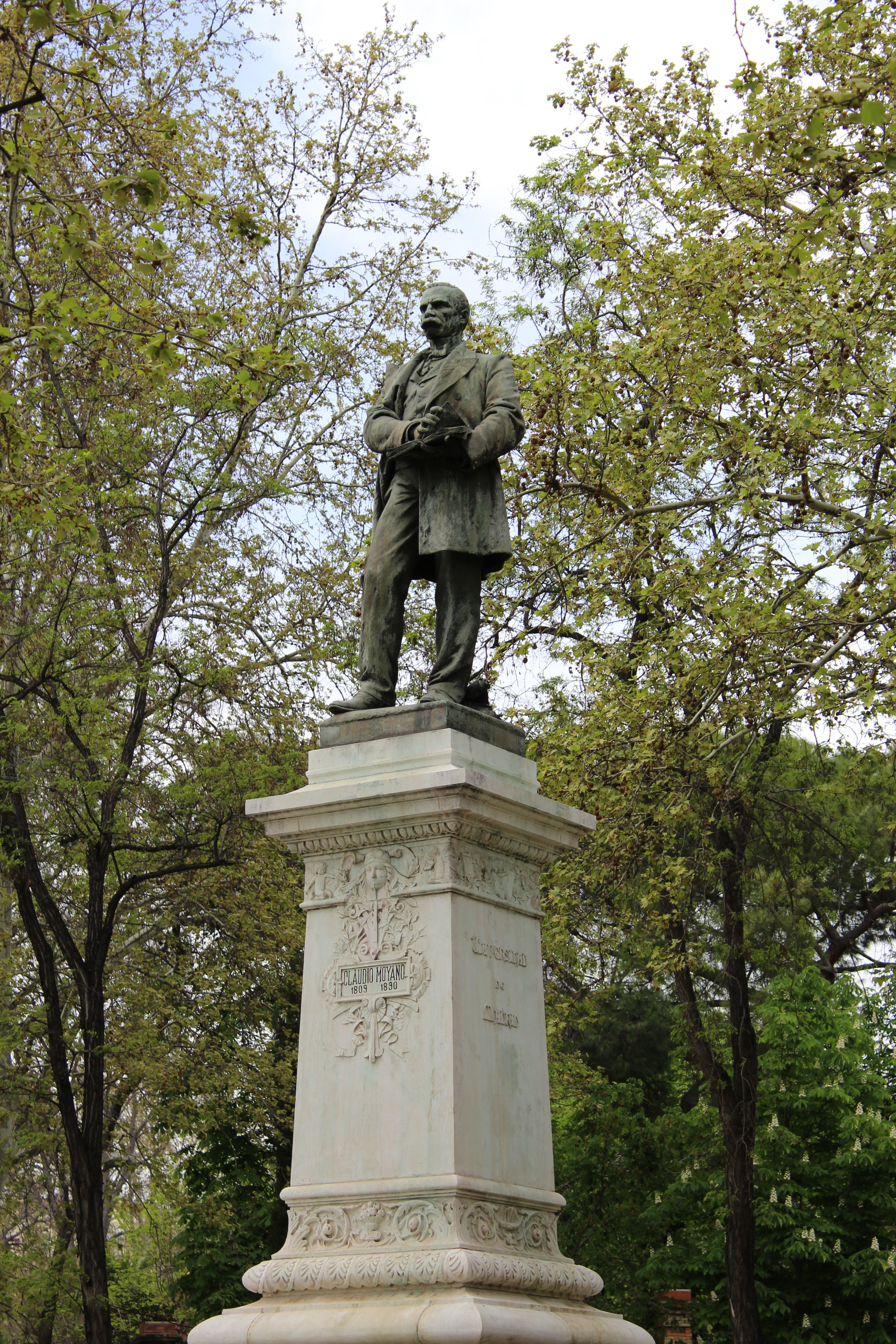
- 40.409396°N 3.691601°W
- Location: Plaza del Emperador Carlos V, Madrid, Spain
- Designer: Agustín Querol
- Material: Bronze, limestone
- Opening date: 11 November 1900
- Dedicated to: Claudio Moyano

The Monument to Claudio Moyano is an instance of public art in Madrid, Spain. Designed by Agustín Querol and located at the Plaza del Emperador Carlos V, it consists of a bronze statue of Claudio Moyano, a 19th century statesman noted for the authorship of the 1857 Law of Education, put on top of a tall stone pedestal.

== History and description ==
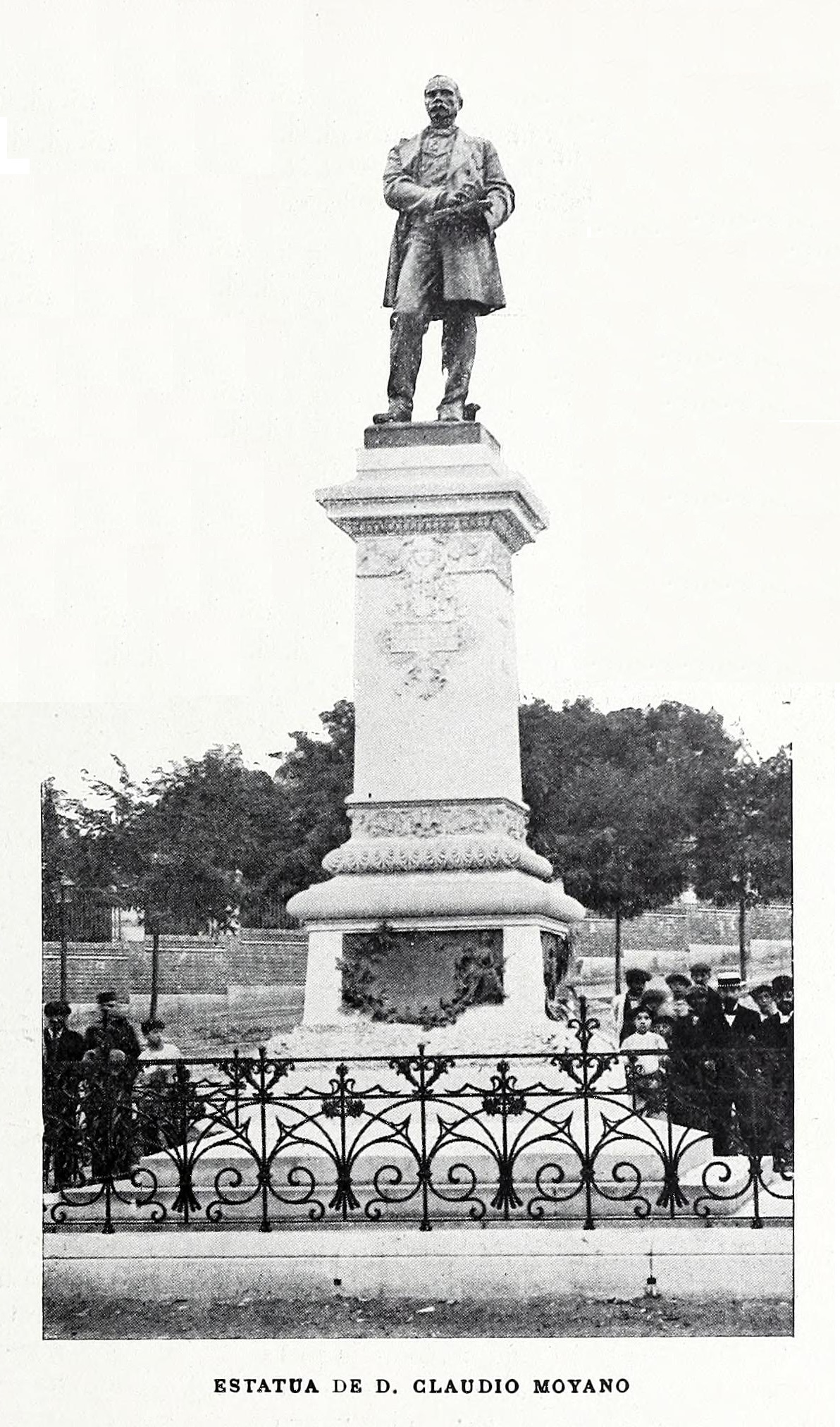
The monument photographed days before the inauguration in 1900

In 1894 Eduardo Vicenti (Director–General for Public Instruction) resumed an earlier initiative to erect a statue to Moyano, giving a new impetus to the plan, that had failed to collect enough money up to that moment. The popular subscription (organised by the teachers of the Province of Zamora) proceeded then to collect funds from the teachers of all the Spanish provinces. The managing committee for the monument awarded the design to Agustín Querol in 1896.

Each side of the lower part of the stone pedestal displays a bronze relief attempting to convey feats of the life of Moyano: the moment he reads his teaching project from the podium of the Congress of Deputies; the moment when Isabella II countersigns his famous 1857 Law; an allegory of an "Angel of the Schools", and the frontal relief, related to the inauguration, featuring an allegory of Pheme holding a cartouche that reads: "al sr. d. claudio moyano y samaniego, por los grandes servicios servicios prestados a la instrucción pública, el profesorado español. año 1900" ("To Mr. Don Claudio Moyano y Samaniego, for the great services rendered to public instruction, the Spanish teaching staff. Year 1990.").

The bronze sculpture topping the tall pedestal represents a solemn Moyano in attitude of reading his laws to the people.

The monument was unveiled at its location at the plaza de Atocha on 11 November 1900. The retinue for the inauguration included Antonio García Alix (Minister of Public Instruction), Francisco Fernández y González (Rector of the Central University), Francisco Commelerán, Ricardo Becerro de Bengoa, Silverio Moyano (nephew of Claudio Moyano), the Mayor of Madrid, the civil governor, council members of the Ayuntamiento and the Provincial Deputation (of Madrid, but there was also representatives of the Deputation of Zamora), and a multitude of representatives of schools from locations all around the country. José Muro, Vital Aza an Dr. Tolosa Latour were also reportedly seen among the attendees.

The monument endured many moves up and down the city along the tumultuous 20th century (including a first move to the plaza de Luca de Tena, and a second move to some gardens in front of a school). Mayor Enrique Tierno Galván decided to return the monument to its (rough) original location on the occasion of the 125th anniversary of the Moyano Law in 1982, completing the move on 28 March 1982. Municipal architect Joaquín Roldán managed the works pertaining the move.

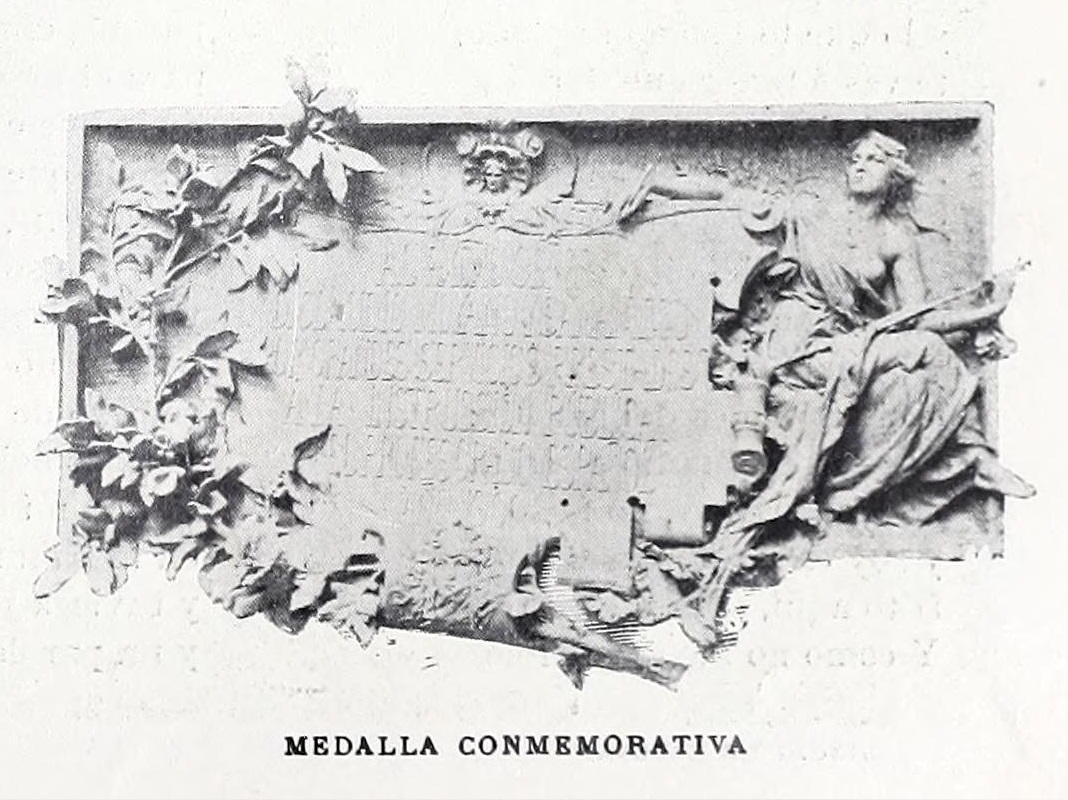
Relief with the commemorative cartouche and the allegory of Pheme

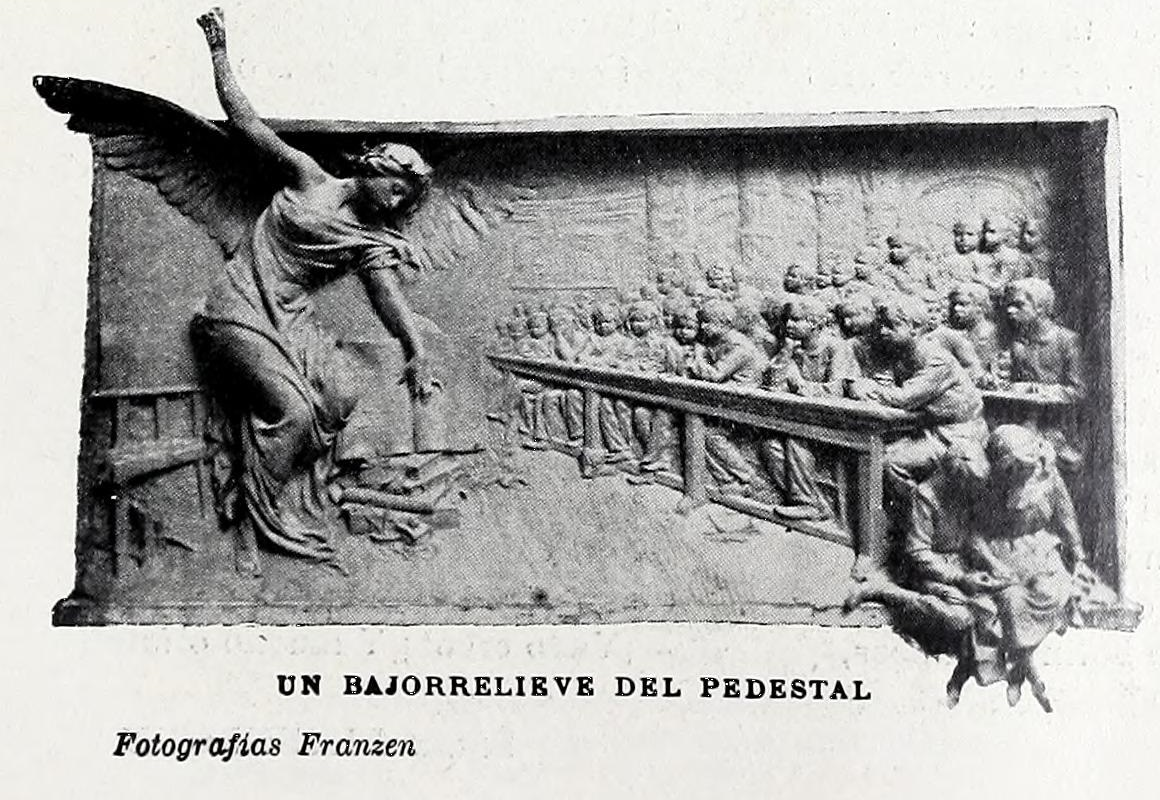
Relief with the allegory of the "Angel of the Schools"
