= Monument to Mendizábal (Madrid) =

Former monument in Madrid, Spain

Mendizábal
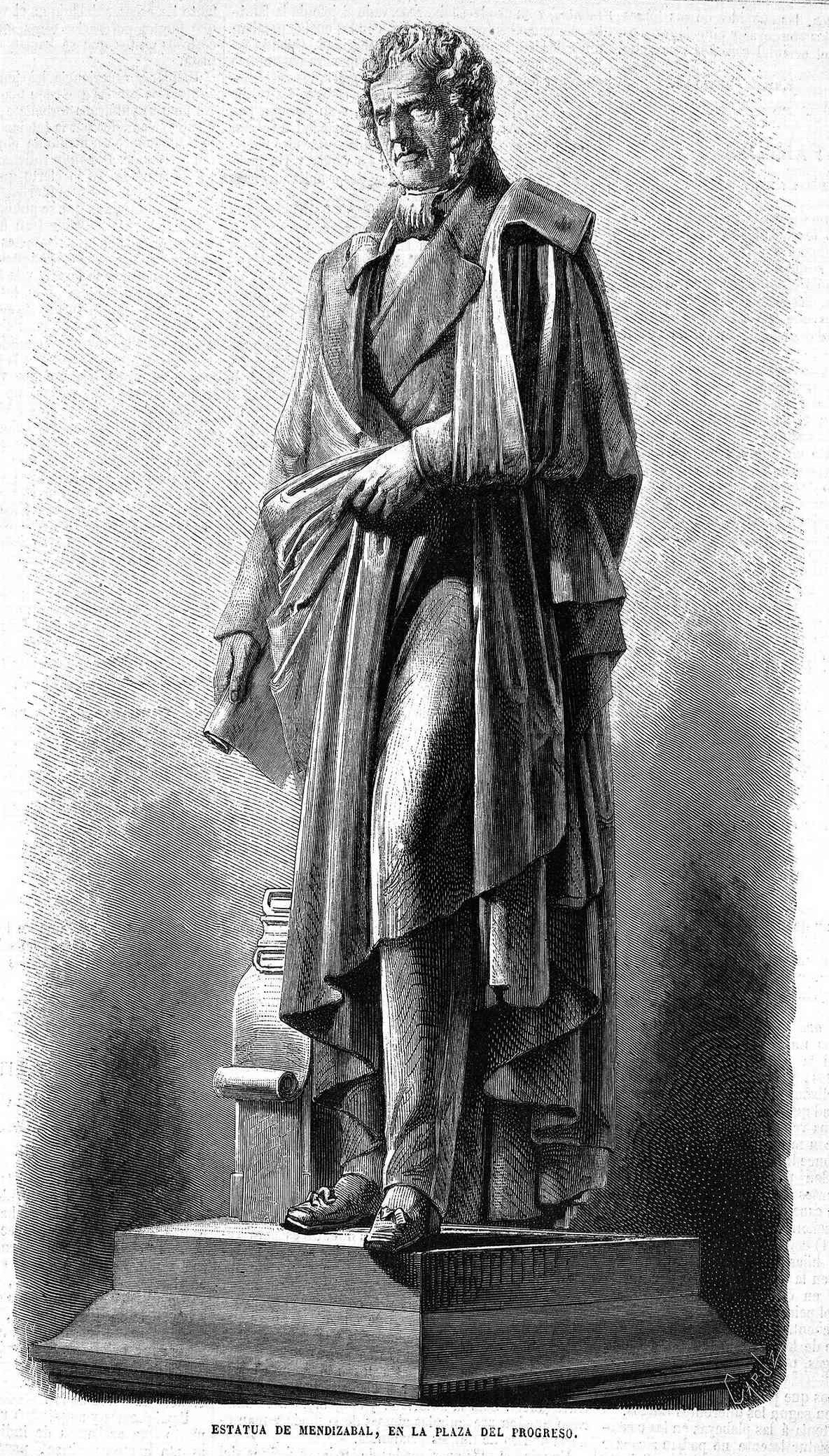
- 40.412368°N 3.704239°W
- Location: Plaza del Progreso, Madrid, Spain
- Designer: José Gragera
- Material: Bronze, stone
- Opening date: 6 June 1869
- Dedicated to: Juan Álvarez Mendizábal
- Dismantled date: 1939

The monument to Mendizábal was an instance of public art in Madrid, Spain. Located in the Plaza del Progreso, it consisted of a bronze statue of Juan Álvarez Mendizábal, architect of the Liberal reforms in Spain in the 1830s, and a stone pedestal. It was removed in 1939.

== History and description ==
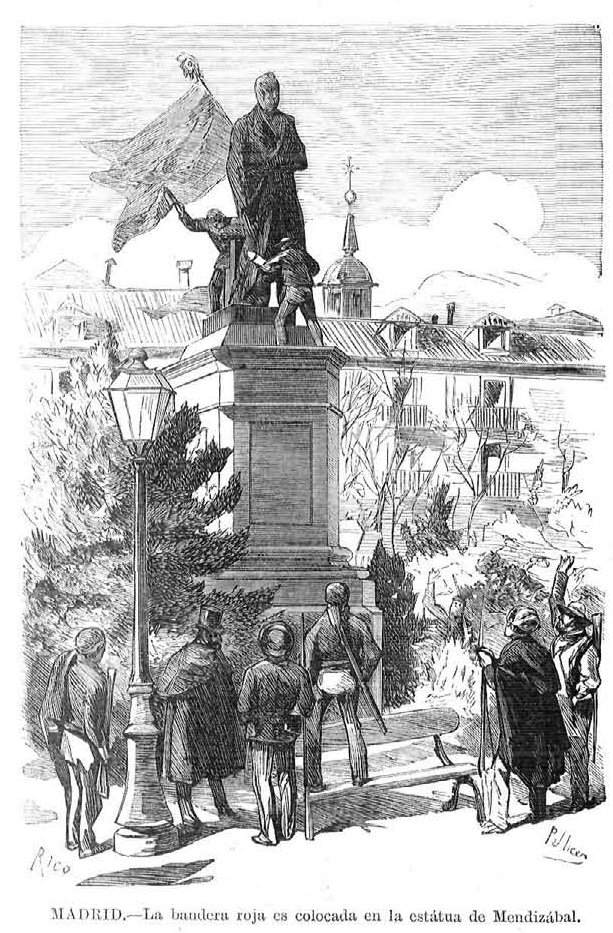
The red flag is put in the statue in 1873

A work by José Gragera, commissioned after the death of Mendizábal in 1853, it was cast in bronze by Eck & Durand in Paris. It arrived to Madrid in 1857. Following a series of delays regarding the indecision on the location of the monument, works to install it in the Plaza del Progreso started in 1868. The monument was unveiled on 6 June 1869, during a ceremony attended by the General Serrano and a small boy, grandson of Mendizábal.

The politician wore a levite, pants and a gilet, with his left hand performing the hand-in-waistcoat pose. The prismatic plinth was an austere work lacking in ornamental details and it reportedly lacked an inscription referencing the name of the politician until 1904.

Following the entry of the Francoist troops in Madrid in 1939 towards the end of Spanish Civil War, the monument was toppled from its location. The bronze may have been recast in another monument. The plaza del Progreso was renamed as "Plaza de Tirso de Molina" and a sculpture of the later figure replaced the original monument in 1943.

== Sources ==
- Alpuente, Moncho (16 February 1986). "Tirso de Molina". El País.
- Fraguas, Rafael (12 March 2001). "En busca de la estatua de Juan Álvarez Mendizábal". El País.
- Salvador Prieto, María Socorro (1993–1994). "Precisiones a un monumento escultórico madrileño desaparecido: Mendizábal". Anales de historia del arte. 4. Madrid: Ediciones Complutense: 505–512. ISSN 0214-6452.
