= Plaza del Emperador Carlos V =

Coordinates: 40°24′31.37″N 3°41′31.25″W

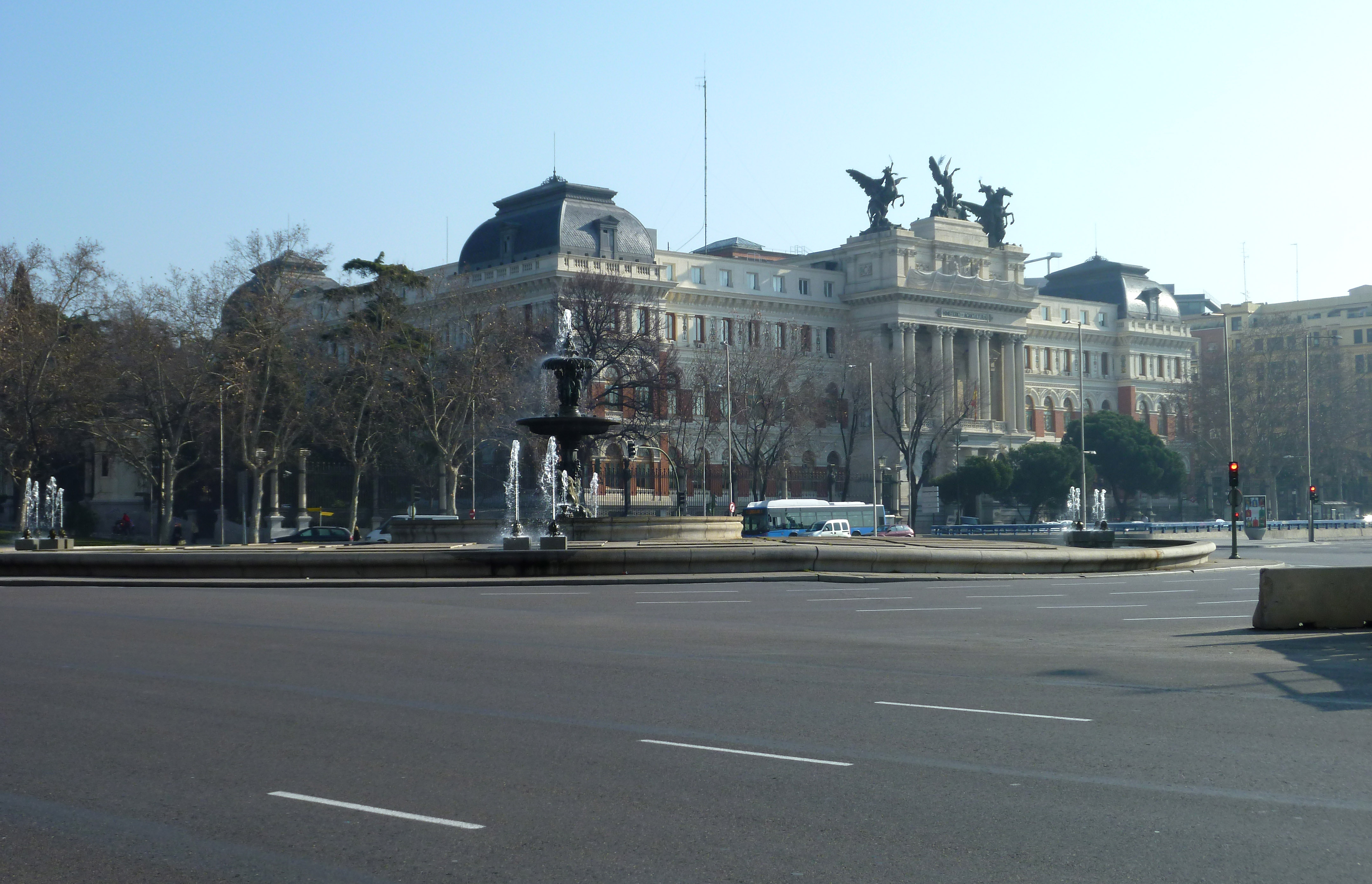
- Plaza del Emperador Carlos V, with the Fuente de la Alcachofa in the foreground and the Ministry of Agriculture in the background
- Interactive map of Plaza del Emperador Carlos V
- Type: Roundabout, street junction
- Location: Madrid, Spain
- Major junctions: Calle de Atocha, Paseo del Prado, Paseo de la Infanta Isabel, Avenida de la Ciudad de Barcelona, Calle de Méndez Álvaro, Paseo de las Delicias, Paseo de Santa María de la Cabeza, Ronda de Atocha

Plaza del Emperador Carlos V (Emperor Charles V square) is a square in the city of Madrid. It is named after Charles V, Holy Roman Emperor, who also reigned in Spain as Charles I. However, it is referred to as Plaza de Atocha, because it is where Madrid Atocha railway station is located.

== Overview ==
Other important landmarks of the square are the Museo Nacional Centro de Arte Reina Sofía and the Ministry of Agriculture Building, as well as a statue of 19th century politician Claudio Moyano. The square, which has a long rectangular shape, has a large roundabout at one of its ends, in the centre of which is one of two fountains in Madrid known as "Fuente de la Alcachofa" (Artichoke fountain) (the other being in the Parque del Retiro).

A number of streets converge at this square, including the Calle de Atocha, Paseo del Prado, Paseo de la Infanta Isabel, Avenida de la Ciudad de Barcelona, Calle de Méndez Álvaro, Paseo de las Delicias, Paseo de Santa María de la Cabeza, and Ronda de Atocha.

Subway station (Metro de Madrid): Atocha (line 1)

== See also ==
- The ward of Atocha
