= La Chopera =

Coordinates: 40°23′42″N 3°41′58″W

- City neighborhood
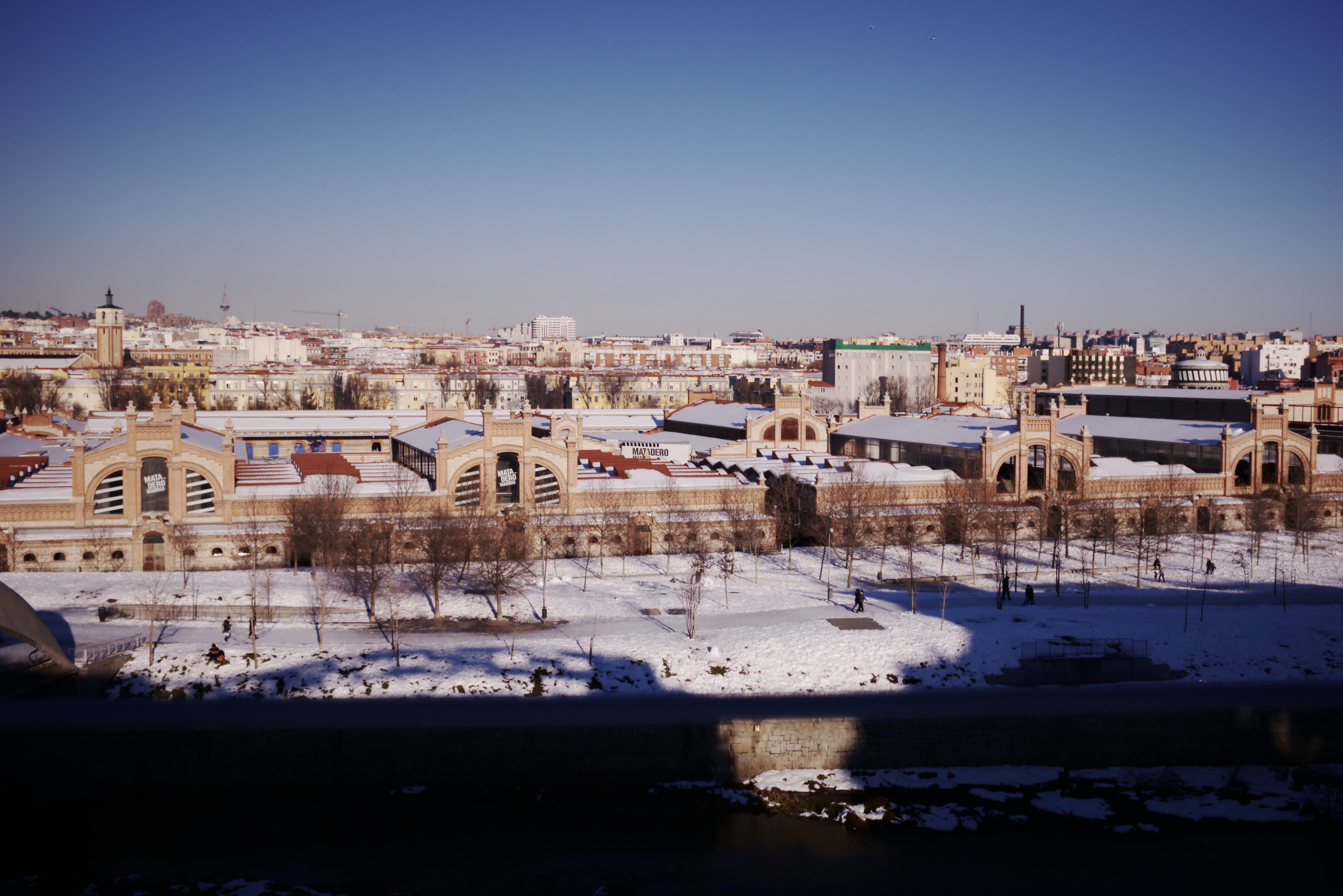
- Interactive map of La Chopera
- Country: Spain
- Aut. community: Community of Madrid
- Municipality: Madrid
- District: Arganzuela

La Chopera is an administrative neighborhood (barrio) of Madrid belonging to the district of Arganzuela.
