= Ronda de Atocha =

Thoroughfare in Madrid, Spain

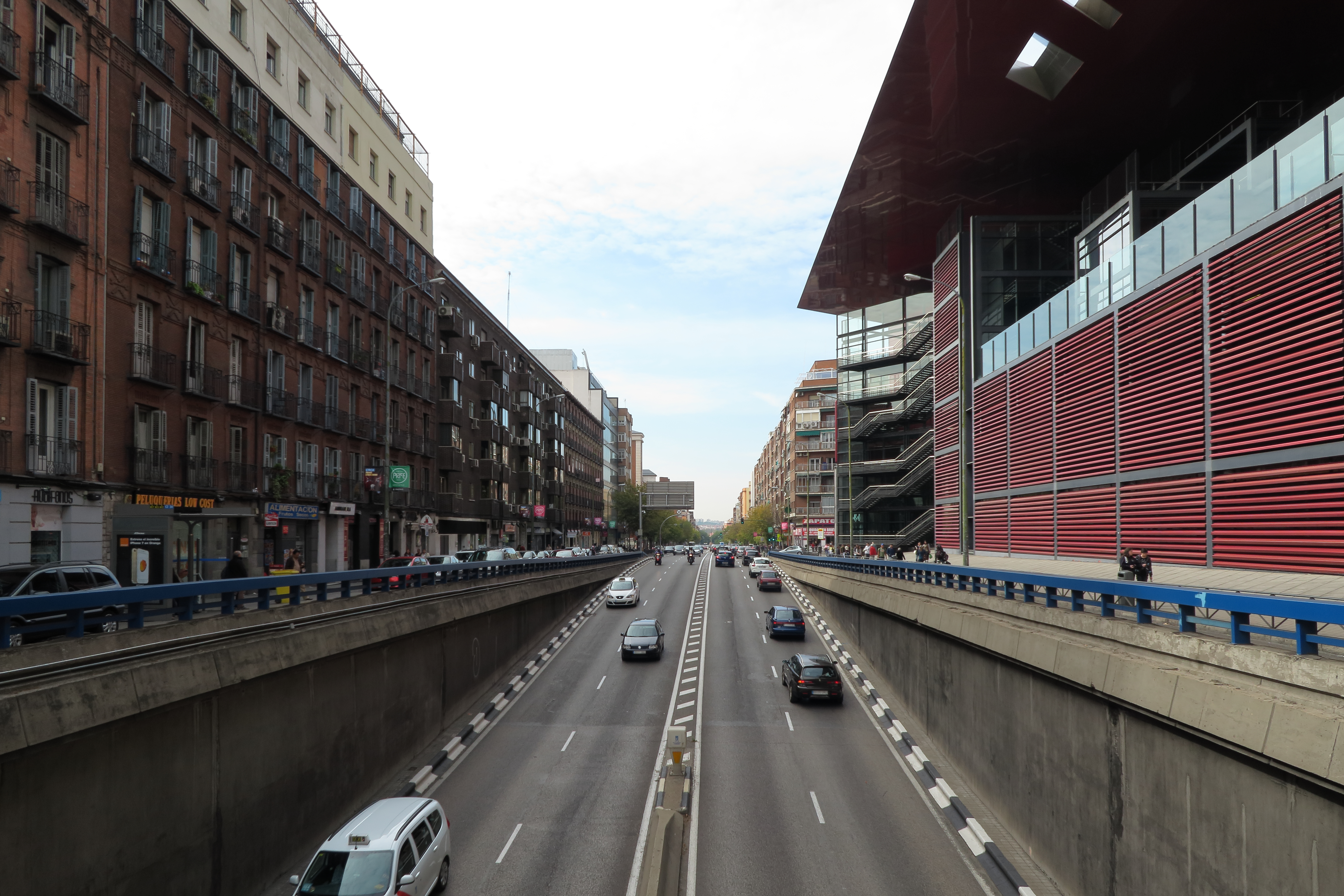
- Type: public thoroughfare
- Location: Madrid, Spain
- East end: Plaza del Emperador Carlos V
- West end: Ronda de Valencia

The Ronda de Atocha is a thoroughfare in Madrid, Spain. It is part of the rim of streets rounding up the city historical centre, following the layout of the Walls of Philip IV.

== History and description ==
Starting in the Plaza del Emperador Carlos V and ending in the Ronda de Valencia, the ronda de Atocha conforms a stretch of the southern limits of the Centro district. The Ronda occupies part of the layout of the ancient Walls of Philip IV.

The ronda already existed when the map of Texeira (1656) was created.

The area was refurbished during the reign of Charles III (late 18th century), and the Ronda de Atocha became part of a trident of forested boulevards (along the Paseo de las Delicias and the Paseo de Santa María de la Cabeza) that followed the patte d'oie configuration in vogue at the time.

Following the end of the 1936–1939 Spanish Civil War, during the Francoist dictatorship, the name of the Ronda de Atocha was changed to "General Primo de Rivera", in reference to Miguel Primo de Rivera. After 1968, the thoroughfare featured one of the three overpasses of so-called "scalextric" of Atocha, that infamously became one of the largest hotspots of air pollution in the entire city.

On 25 January 1980, during the municipal government of Enrique Tierno Galván, (Note: Although, convalescent from a retinal detachment repair, the Mayor could not attend to the voting and delegated the chairing of the plenary session to Ramón Tamames. The Union of the Democratic Centre (UCD) opposed the proposed changes and submitted a full amendment. The initiative came through with the votes from the municipal councillors of the Spanish Socialist Workers' Party (PSOE) and the Communist Party of Spain (PCE).) the City Council voted in favour of returning the name of the thoroughfare back to "Ronda de Atocha" along a wider change of another 26 street names connected to the Francoist dictatorship or the Civil War. Meanwhile, the dismantling of the "scalextric" started in 1985. Works were completed in 1986.
