= Imperial (Madrid) =

Coordinates: 40°24′24″N 3°43′1″W

- Neighborhood of Madrid
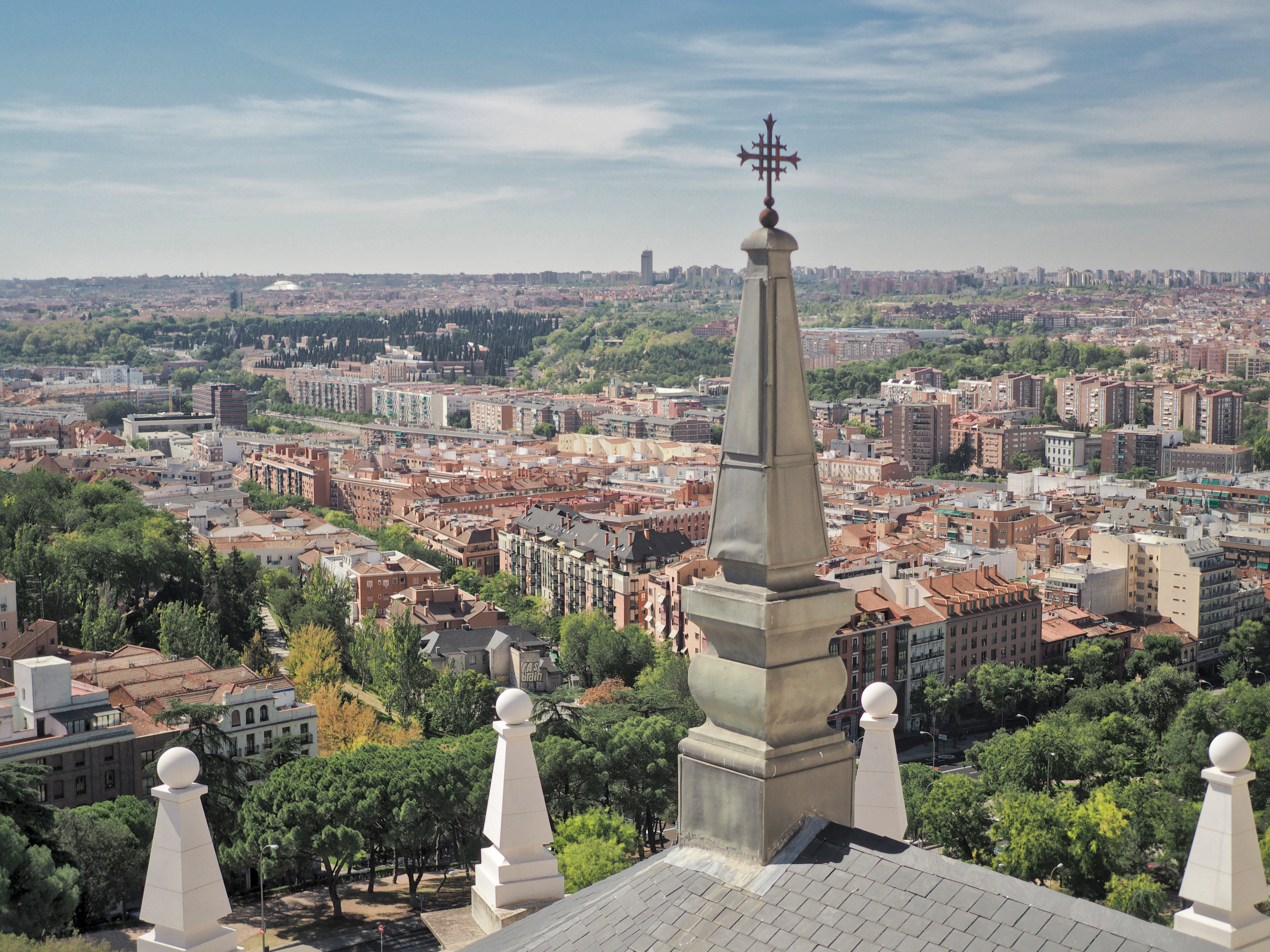
- Interactive map of Imperial
- Country: Spain
- Autonomous community: Madrid
- Municipality: Madrid
- District: Arganzuela

Area
  - Total: 0.967500 km^{2} (0.373554 sq mi)

Imperial is an administrative neighborhood (barrio) of Madrid belonging to the district of Arganzuela. It is 0.967500 km^{2} in size.
