= Arganzuela =

- District
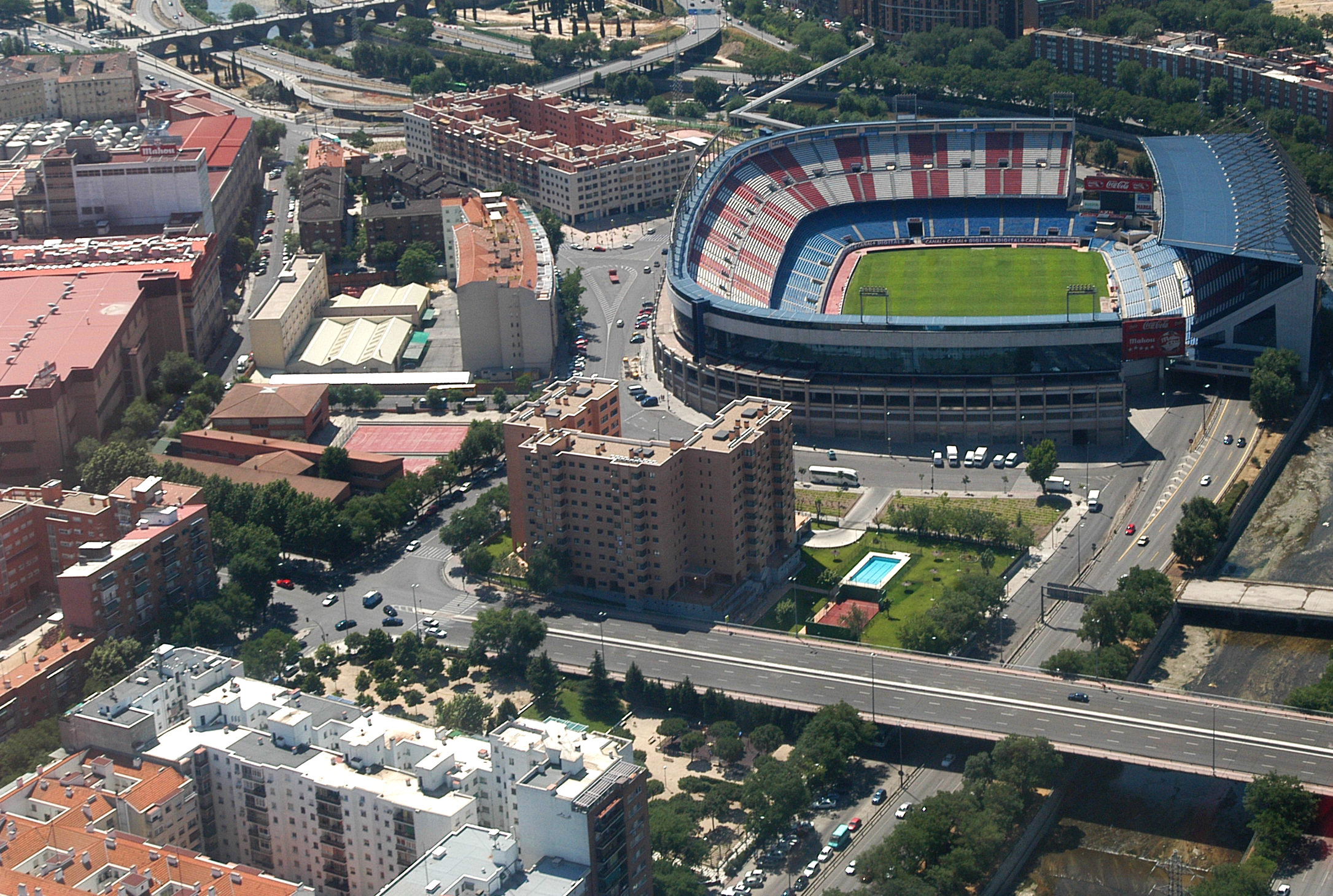
- Interactive map of Arganzuela
- Country: Spain
- Autonomous community: Madrid
- Municipality: Madrid

Government
  - Councillor-President: Dolores Navarro Ruiz (PP, 2023)

Area
  - Total: 6.55 km^{2} (2.53 sq mi)

Population
  - Total: 148,797
  - Density: 27,700/km^{2} (72,000/sq mi)
- Postal code: 28032
- Madrid district number: 2

Arganzuela (Spanish pronunciation: [aɾɣanˈθwela]) is one of the 21 districts of the city of Madrid, Spain.

== Geography ==
=== Position ===
Arganzuela is located in central-southern Madrid, separated from Latina, Carabanchel and Usera by the river Manzanares. The other bordering districts are Centro, Retiro and Puente de Vallecas.

=== Subdivision ===
The district is administratively divided into 7 wards (Barrios):

- Atocha
- Imperial
- La Chopera
- Las Acacias
- Las Delicias
- Legazpi
- Palos de Moguer

== Sightseeing ==
Matadero Madrid, in Arganzuela, is a former slaughterhouse that is currently a free entrance area and cultural centre where many activities take place in daytime.

== See also ==
- Gate of Toledo
- Madrid Atocha railway station
