= Plaza de Tirso de Molina =

Public square in Madrid

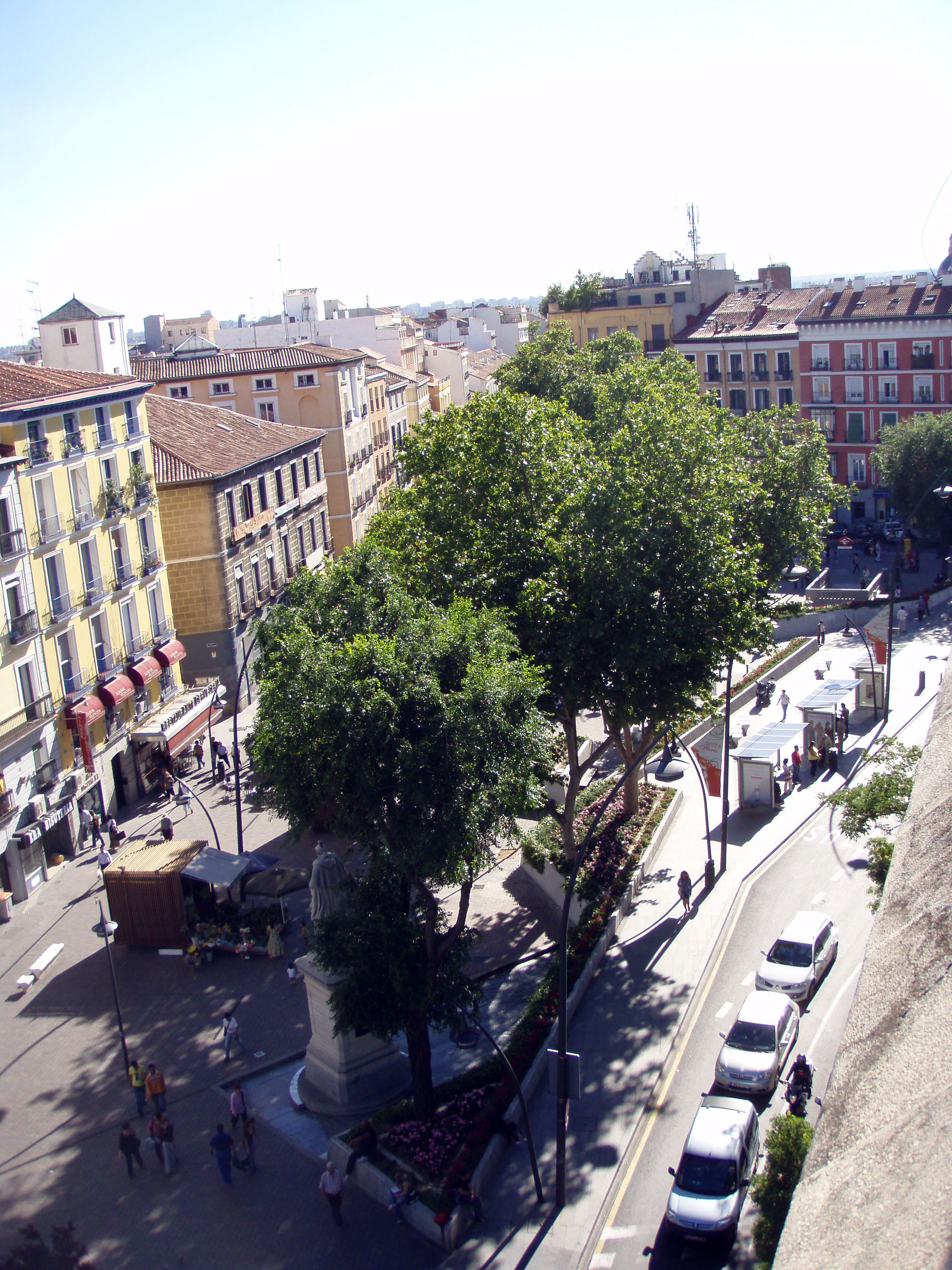
- Namesake: Tirso de Molina
- Type: plaza
- Maintained by: Ayuntamiento of Madrid
- Location: Centro, Madrid, Spain
- Coordinates: 40.412346°N 3.704666°W

The plaza de Tirso de Molina is a public square in the city of Madrid, Spain.

== History and description ==
The square features a roughly triangular shape, covering an area close to 6,000 square metres.

Created upon the demolition of the Convento de la Merced during the early years of the reign of Isabella II, it was inaugurated under the name of Plaza del Progreso ("Square of the Progress"), with some trees planted on the plot. After the 1868 Glorious Revolution, the square gained a statue of Juan Álvarez Mendizábal, precisely the minister behind the ecclesiastical confiscation. After the Francoist victory in the Civil War, the statue of Mendizábal was replaced in 1943 by another one representing Gabriel Téllez (best known as "Tirso de Molina").

The square undertook a major revamp in the 2000s, seeking to reinforce its value as pedestrian area. The project was authored by the Haiku Studio. The reform was inaugurated in 2006.

Located to the north of Embajadores, it constitutes a reference for the latter neighborhood despite its rather small size.
