= Palos de la Frontera (Madrid) =

Coordinates: 40°24′14″N 3°41′38″W

Palos de la Frontera Palos de Moguer
- City neighborhood
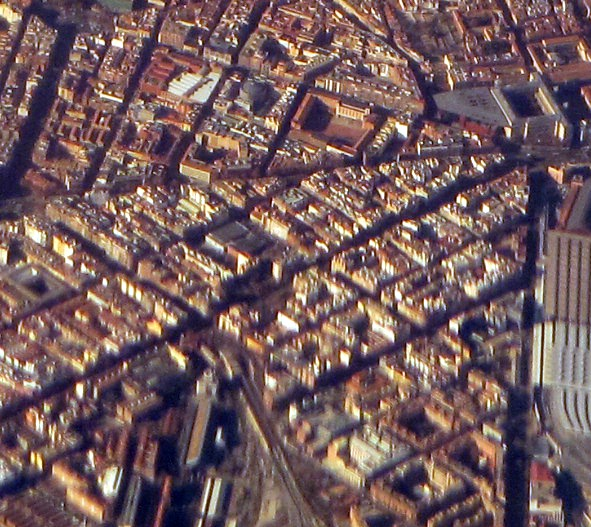

- Country: Spain
- Region: Community of Madrid
- Municipality: Madrid
- District: Arganzuela

Area
  - Total: 0.643542 km^{2} (0.248473 sq mi)

Palos de la Frontera (known as Palos de Moguer before 2022) is an administrative neighborhood (barrio) of Madrid belonging to the district of Arganzuela. It has an area of 0.643542 km^{2} (0.248473 sq mi).
