= Legazpi (Madrid) =

Coordinates: 40°23′19″N 3°41′42.64″W

- City neighborhood
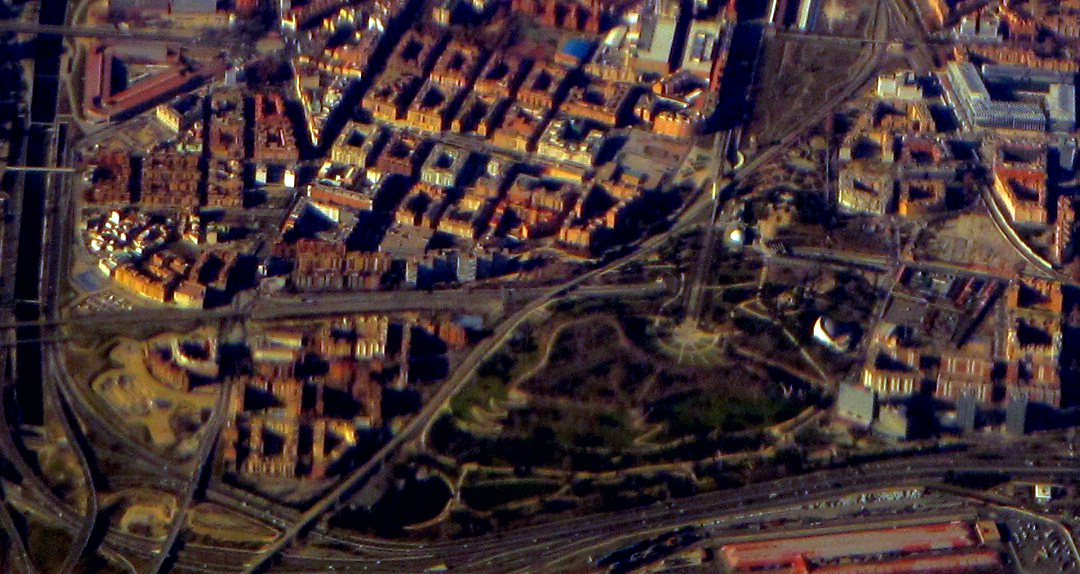
- Interactive map of Legazpi
- Country: Spain
- Region: Community of Madrid
- Municipality: Madrid
- District: Arganzuela

Area
  - Total: 1.396410 km^{2} (0.539157 sq mi)

Population (2020)
  - Total: 19,820
  - Density: 14,190/km^{2} (36,760/sq mi)

Legazpi ([leˈɣaθpi]) is an administrative neighborhood (barrio) of Madrid belonging to the district of Arganzuela. It has an area of 1.39 km^{2} (340 acres). As of 1 February 2020, it has a population of 19,820.
