= Las Delicias (Madrid) =

Coordinates: 40°23′45″N 3°41′22″W

- City neighborhood
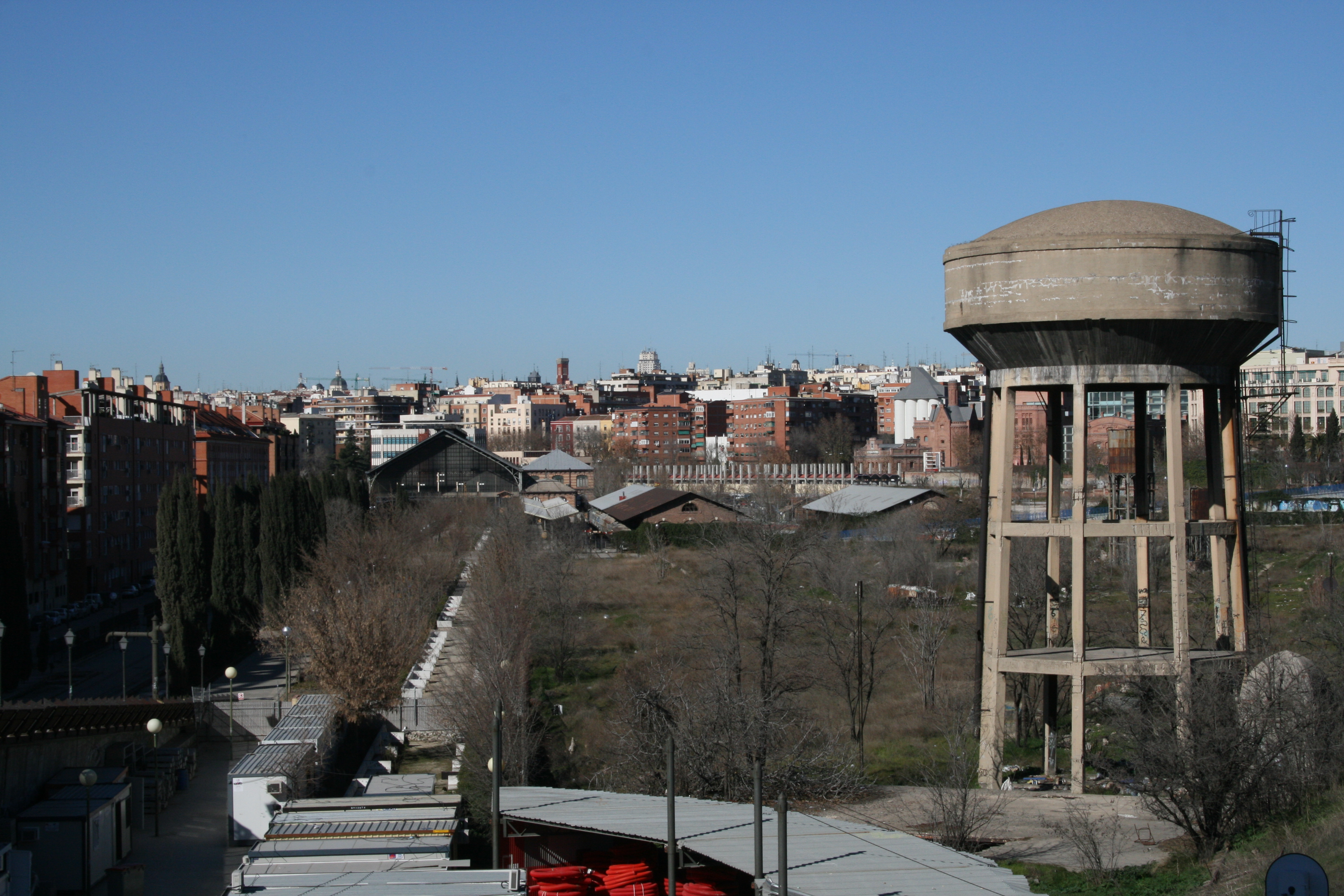
- Interactive map of Las Delicias
- Country: Spain
- Aut. community: Community of Madrid
- Municipality: Madrid
- District: Arganzuela

Las Delicias is an administrative neighborhood (barrio) of Madrid belonging to the district of Arganzuela.
