= 2006 in literature =

This article contains information about the literary events and publications of 2006.

== Events ==
- March – The first full-length original novel in the Manx language, Dunveryssyn yn Tooder-Folley ("The Vampire Murders"), is published by Brian Stowell, after being serialized in the press.
- April 7 – Justice Peter Smith concludes in a case of February 27 in the London High Court of Justice against the publisher Random House over the bestselling novel The Da Vinci Code (2003), that the author, Dan Brown, has not breached the copyright of Michael Baigent and Richard Leigh in their The Holy Blood and the Holy Grail (1982, non-fiction). The judgment also contains a coded message on the whim of the judge.
- April 7–9 – First Jaipur Literature Festival held in India.
- Summer – Brutalism becomes the first literary movement to be launched through the social networking site Myspace.
- June 14 – Ciaran Creagh's play Last Call, based loosely on the hanging of the murderer Michael Manning in 1954, as witnessed by the playwright's father, is staged in Mountjoy Prison, Dublin, where it is set.
- June–September – Elif Şafak is tried for "insulting Turkishness" in her novel The Bastard of Istanbul, published earlier in the year, but eventually acquitted.
- June 7 – The final portion of the library accumulated by Sir Thomas Phillipps (died 1872) is sold by Christie's in London.
- July 14 – The Times Literary Supplement reports on the discovery of a missing copy of Shelley's Poetical Essay on the Existing State of Things, an 1811 pamphlet containing a 172-line poem critical of war, politics and religion; although published anonymously, the poem is thought to have contributed to the rebel poet's expulsion from the University of Oxford (which acquires the unique copy of the pamphlet in 2015).
- August 1 – The University of Helsinki library becomes the National Library of Finland (Kansalliskirjasto).
- September – Museum of Modern Literature opens in Marbach am Neckar, Schiller's birthplace in Germany.
- September 20 – The Writers Guild of America, West, holds a Los Angeles rally in support of the America's Next Top Model writers' strike. President Patric Verrone says: "Every piece of media with a moving image on a screen or a recorded voice must have a writer, and every writer must have a WGA contract."
- November 6 – WGAw files an unfair labor practice complaint with the National Labor Relations Board after Top Model producers say the next season of the show will not require writers. In response, Verrone said, "As they demanded union representation, the company decided they were expendable. This is illegal strikebreaking."

== New books ==
=== Fiction ===
- Chimamanda Ngozi Adichie – Half of a Yellow Sun
- Naomi Alderman – Disobedience
- Martin Amis – House of Meetings
- Margaret Atwood – Moral Disorder
- Muriel Barbery – The Elegance of the Hedgehog (L'Élégance du hérisson) (France, Gallimard)
- Brunonia Barry – The Lace Reader
- François Bégaudeau – Entre les murs (Between the Walls)
- Peter Behrens – The Law of Dreams
- William Boyd – Restless
- T. C. Boyle – Talk Talk
- James Chapman – Stet (January 7)
- Douglas Coupland – jPod
- Mark Z. Danielewski – Only Revolutions
- Patricia Duncker – Miss Webster and Chérif
- Dave Eggers – What Is the What: The Autobiography of Valentino Achak Deng (October 25)
- Agustín Fernández Mallo – Nocillo (trilogy, begins publication)
- Gillian Flynn – Sharp Objects
- Aminatta Forna – Ancestor Stones
- Wendy Guerra – Todos se van (Everyone's Leaving)
- Katharina Hacker – Die Habenichtse (The Have-Nots)
- Margaret Peterson Haddix – Among the Free
- Rawi Hage – De Niro's Game
- Hiro Arikawa – Library War (図書館戦争 Toshokan Sensō)
- Anosh Irani – The Song of Kahunsha (Canada, Doubleday)
- Lloyd Jones – Mister Pip
- Philip Kerr – The One from the Other
- Torsten Krol – The Dolphin People
- Vincent Lam – Bloodletting and Miraculous Cures
- Jon McGregor – So Many Ways to Begin
- David Mitchell – Black Swan Green
- Alice Munro – The View from Castle Rock
- Amélie Nothomb – Journal d'Hirondelle
- Joyce Carol Oates – Black Girl/White Girl
- Heather O'Neill – Lullabies for Little Criminals
- Carolyn Parkhurst – Lost and Found
- Thomas Pynchon – Against the Day (November 21)
- Christoph Ransmayr – The Flying Mountain (Der fliegende Berg)
- Ron Rash – The World Made Straight
- James Robertson – The Testament of Gideon Mack
- Will Self – The Book of Dave
- Olga Slavnikova – 2017
- Ngũgĩ wa Thiong'o – Wizard of the Crow (Gikuyu: Mũrogi wa Kagogo)
- Lynne Tillman – American Genius, A Comedy
- John Updike – Terrorist (June 6)
- Mario Vargas Llosa – The Bad Girl (Travesuras de la niña mala)

=== Children and young people ===
- Chris Van Allsburg – Probuditi!
- Dave Barry & Ridley Pearson – Peter and the Shadow Thieves (July 15)
- John Boyne – The Boy in the Striped Pyjamas
- Eoin Colfer – Artemis Fowl and the Lost Colony (September 12, fifth in the Artemis Fowl series)
- John Fardell – The Flight of the Silver Turtle
- Jean-Luc Fromental – 365 Penguins
- Julia Golding – Secret of the Sirens (August 3, UK, first in the Companions Quartet)
- John Green – An Abundance of Katherines
- Gordon Korman – Born to Rock
- J. Patrick Lewis (with Gary Kelley) – Black Cat Bone: The Life of Blues Legend Robert Johnson
- D. J. MacHale – The Quillan Games (May 16)
- David Mitchell – Black Swan Green (April 11)
- Robert Muchamore
  - Divine Madness (fifth in the CHERUB series)
  - Man vs Beast (sixth in the CHERUB series)
- Jenny Nimmo – Charlie Bone and the Hidden King
- Garth Nix – Sir Thursday (March 1) (fourth in The Keys to the Kingdom series)
- Jerry Pinkney – The Little Red Hen
- Terry Pratchett – Wintersmith (October 1, third in the Tiffany Aching series)
- Philip Reeve – A Darkling Plain
- Lemony Snicket – The End (October 13) (13th in A Series of Unfortunate Events)
- Toshihiko Tsukiji and Senmu – Kämpfer (けんぷファー, November 24)

=== Genre fiction ===
Fantasy

- Joe Abercrombie – The Blade Itself (May 4, first in First Law series)
- R. Scott Bakker – The Thousandfold Thought (January 20, third in Prince of Nothing trilogy)
- Steven Erikson – The Bonehunters (March 1, sixth in Malazan Book of the Fallen series)
- Terry Goodkind – Phantom (July 18, 10th in Sword of Truth series)
- Laurell K. Hamilton – Mistral's Kiss (December 12, fifth in Merry Gentry series)
- Gregory Keyes – The Blood Knight (July 11, third in The Kingdoms of Thorn and Bone series)
- Dean Koontz – Brother Odd (November 28, third in Odd Thomas series)
- Tanith Lee – Piratica II (second in The Piratica Series)
- Scott Lynch – The Lies of Locke Lamora (June 27, first in Gentleman Bastards series)
- Patricia A. McKillip – Solstice Wood
- Zhang Muye – Ghost Blows Out the Light (March)
- Angie Sage – Flyte (March 1, second in Septimus Heap series)
- Jeff VanderMeer – Shriek: An Afterword (August 8)
- Rick Riordan – The Sea of Monsters

Historical

- Kunal Basu – Racists
- Bernard Cornwell
  - The Lords of the North
  - Sharpe's Fury
- Debra Dean – The Madonnas of Leningrad
- Charles Frazier – Thirteen Moons (October 3)
- Robert Harris – Imperium
- Michael Moorcock – The Vengeance of Rome (January 5, fourth in the Pyat Quartet)
- Naomi Novik – Temeraire (January 7)
- Andrzej Sapkowski – Lux Perpetua
- Sarah Waters – The Night Watch (March 23)
- Jack Whyte – Knights of the Black and White (August 8, first in the Templar Trilogy)
- Gene Wolfe – Soldier of Sidon (October 31, third book in the Soldier series)

Horror

- James Patterson & Peter de Jonge – Beach Road (May 1)
- Victor Heck – Downward Spiral (November 27)
- Stephen King
  - Cell (January 24)
  - Lisey's Story (October 24)
- Thomas Ligotti – Teatro Grottesco
- James Robert Smith and Stephen Mark Rainey (ed.) – Evermore

Humor and satire

- Max Barry – Company (January 17)
- Ben Elton – Chart Throb
- Bobby Henderson – The Gospel of the Flying Spaghetti Monster (March 28)
- Maddox – The Alphabet of Manliness (June)
- Carl Hiaasen – Nature Girl (November 14)
- Vladimir Sorokin – Day of the Oprichnik

Mystery and crime

- Gilbert Adair – The Act of Roger Murgatroyd
- Robert Baer – Blow the House Down a novel (May 30)
- Mary Higgins Clark – Two Little Girls in Blue
- Ranj Dhaliwal – Daaku (October 6)
- Michael Connelly – Echo Park (October 9)
- Patricia Cornwell
  - At Risk (May 23, first in the At Risk series)
  - Book of the Dead (October 24, 15th in Kay Scarpetta series)
- Clive Cussler – Treasure of Khan (December 5)
- Jeffery Deaver
  - The Cold Moon (May 30, seventh in the Lincoln Rhyme series)
  - More Twisted (December 16)
- Nelson DeMille – Wild Fire (November 6)
- Thomas Harris – Hannibal Rising (December 5, fourth in Hannibal Lecter series)
- Tony Hillerman – The Shape Shifter (November 1, 12th in Joe Leaphorn/Jim Chee series)
- Dean Koontz – The Husband (May 30)
- Stieg Larsson (died 2004) – The Girl Who Played with Fire (Flickan som lekte med elden)
- Val McDermid – The Grave Tattoo (February 6)
- James Patterson
  - Cross (November 14, 12th in Alex Cross series)
  - Judge and Jury (July 31)
- James Patterson & Maxine Paetro – The 5th Horseman (February 13)
- Michael Slade – Kamikaze (November 7)
- Thomas Sullivan – The Water Wolf (October 3)
- Andrew Vachss – Mask Market
- Samantha Weinberg – Secret Servant: The Moneypenny Diaries
- Jack Whyte – The Eagle (December 26, ninth in Camulod Chronicles series)

Romance

- Karen Marie Moning – Darkfever (October 31)
- Stephenie Meyer – New Moon
- Nicholas Sparks – Dear John (October 30)
- Danielle Steel – H. R. H. (October 31)

Sci-fi

- Aaron Allston – Betrayal (May 30, first in Legacy of the Force series)
- Elizabeth Bear – Carnival (November 28)
- Troy Denning – Tempest (November 28)
- David Louis Edelman – Infoquake (July 5, first in Jump 225 trilogy)
- Drew Karpyshyn – Path of Destruction: a Novel of the New Republic (September 26)
- Paul Levinson – The Plot to Save Socrates (February 6)
- Cormac McCarthy – The Road (September 26)
- Yvonne Navarro – Ultraviolet (March 1)
- Tim Powers – Three Days to Never (August 1)
- J. D. Robb – Born in Death (November 7, 23rd in In Death series)
- Masamune Shirow – Ghost in the Shell 1.5: Human Error Processor
- Charles Stross – Glasshouse (June 27)
- Karen Traviss
  - Bloodlines (August 29, second in Legacy of the Force series)
  - Triple Zero (second in Star Wars: Republic Commando series)
- Peter Watts – Blindsight (October 3)
- Stephen Woodworth – From Black Rooms (October 31, fourth in Violet series)
- Timothy Zahn – Outbound Flight (January 31)

=== Drama ===
- Salvatore Antonio – In Gabriel's Kitchen
- Jacob M. Appel – Arborophilia
- Tanya Barfield – Blue Door
- Howard Brenton – In Extremis
- Gregory Burke – Black Watch
- John Cariani – Almost Maine
- Nilo Cruz – Beauty of the Father
- Brian Friel – Faith Healer
- Richard Greenberg – A Naked Girl on the Appian Way
- Rinne Groff – What Then
- Lisa Kron – Well
- Neil LaBute – Fat Pig
- David Lindsay-Abaire – Rabbit Hole
- Itamar Moses – Bach at Leipzig
- Joël Pommerat – Cet enfant
- Nina Raine – Rabbit
- Adam Rapp – Red Light Winter

=== Non-fiction ===
- Debby Applegate – The Most Famous Man in America
- Enrique Desmond Arias – Drugs and Democracy in Rio de Janeiro
- Karen Armstrong – Muhammad: A Prophet for Our Time
- Philip Ball – The Devil's Doctor: Paracelsus and the World of Renaissance Magic and Science
- Alison Bechdel – Fun Home
- Jimmy Carter – Palestine: Peace Not Apartheid
- Christopher Catherwood – A Brief History of the Middle East
- Rajiv Chandrasekaran – Imperial Life in the Emerald City: Inside Iraq's Green Zone
- Julia Child with Alex Prud'homme – My Life in France
- Richard Dawkins – The God Delusion
- Daniel Dennett – Breaking the Spell
- Alain de Botton – The Architecture of Happiness
- Nora Ephron – I Feel Bad About My Neck
- Wayne Federman with Marshall Terrill and Pete Maravich – Maravich
- Al Gore – An Inconvenient Truth
- Glenn Greenwald – How Would a Patriot Act? Defending American Values from a President Run Amok
- John Grisham – The Innocent Man: Murder and Injustice in a Small Town
- Nicky Hager – The Hollow Men
- Sam Harris – Letter to a Christian Nation
- Tsuyoshi Hasegawa (長谷川毅) – Racing the Enemy: Stalin, Truman, and the Surrender of Japan
- Christopher Hitchens – Thomas Paine's "Rights of Man": A Biography
- Derrick Jensen – Endgame
- Elizabeth Kolbert – Field Notes from a Catastrophe
- Christian Kracht, Eva Munz and Lukas Nikol – The Ministry of Truth (Die totale Erinnerung)
- Rohan Kriwaczek – An Incomplete History of the Art of Funerary Violin
- Linden MacIntyre – Causeway
- Larry Miller – Spoiled Rotten America: Outrages of Contemporary Life
- Max Nemni and Monique Nemni – Young Trudeau: Son of Quebec, Father of Canada, 1919–1944
- Barack Obama – The Audacity of Hope
- Lena Phoenix – The Heart of a Cult
- John Ramsden – Don't Mention the War: How the British and the Germans Survived Bombing in World War II
- Ruth Scurr – Fatal Purity: Robespierre and the French Revolution
- Richard Sennett – The Culture of the New Capitalism
- Zhi Gang Sha – Soul, Mind, Body Medicine
- Peter Sloterdijk – Rage and Time (Zorn und Zeit)
- Tavis Smiley – What I Know For Sure: My Story of Growing Up in America
- David Suzuki – David Suzuki: The Autobiography
- Peter Tyrrell – Founded on Fear (posthumous publication)
- Hywel Williams – Days That Changed the World: the 50 Defining Events of World History

== Births ==
- unknown dates
  - Nick Stitle – American fantasy author

== Deaths ==
- January 4 – Irving Layton, Canadian poet (born 1912)
- January 16 – Jan Mark, English children's writer (born 1943)
- January 19 – Awn Alsharif Qasim, Sudanese author and scholar (born 1933)
- January 30 – Wendy Wasserstein, American playwright (born 1950)
- February 2 – Chris Doty, Canadian dramatist (born 1966)
- February 4 – Betty Friedan, American feminist writer (born 1921)
- February 8 – Michael Gilbert, English crime writer (born 1912)
- February 9 – Ena Lamont Stewart, Scottish playwright (born 1912)
- February 11 – Peter Benchley, American novelist (born 1940)
- February 17 – Sybille Bedford, German-born English novelist and journalist (born 1911)
- February 20 – Lucjan Wolanowski (Lucjan Kon), Polish writer, journalist and traveler (born 1920)
- February 21
  - Gennadiy Aygi, Chuvashian poet and translator (born 1934)
  - Theodore Draper, American historian (born 1912)
- February 22 – Hilde Domin, German writer (born 1909)
- February 24 – Octavia E. Butler, American science fiction writer (born 1947)
- February 25 – Margaret Gibson, Canadian novelist and story writer (born 1948)
- March 12 – Jurij Brězan, German/Sorbian writer (born 1916)
- March 27 – Stanisław Lem, Polish science fiction writer (born 1921)
- March 30 – John McGahern, Irish novelist, dramatist and short story writer (born 1934)
- April 3 – Muhammad al-Maghut, Syrian Ismaili poet (born 1934)
- April 6 – Leslie Norris, Anglo-Welsh poet and author (born 1921)
- April 8 – Gerard Reve, Dutch novelist and poet (born 1923)
- April 13 – Muriel Spark, Scottish-born novelist (born 1918)
- April 25 – Jane Jacobs, American urban planning critic and activist (born 1916)
- April 30 - Herbert Burkholz, American novelist and non-fiction author
- May 9 – Jerzy Ficowski, poet, writer and translator (born 1924)
- May 16 – Clare Boylan, Irish novelist (born 1948)
- May 18 – Gilbert Sorrentino, American novelist and poet (born 1929)
- June 17 – James H. McClure, South African-born crime writer (born 1939)
- June 28 – Nigel Cox, New Zealand novelist (born 1951)
- July 17 – Mickey Spillane, American crime writer (born 1918)
- July 28 – David Gemmell, English fantasy novelist (born 1948)
- August 16 – Alex Buzo, Australian playwright and author (born 1944)
- August 17 – Shamsur Rahman, Bengali poet (born 1929)
- August 21 – S. Yizhar, Israeli novelist (born 1916)
- August 25 – Silva Kaputikyan, Armenian poet (born 1919)
- August 30 – Naguib Mahfouz, Egyptian novelist, 1988 Nobel Prize in Literature laureate (born 1911)
- September 1 – György Faludy, Hungarian poet, writer and translator (born 1910)
- September 12 – Edna Staebler CM, Canadian author and literary journalist (born 1906)
- October 13 – Protiva Bose, Bengali writer and singer (born 1915)
- October 17 – Ursula Moray Williams, English children's writer (born 1911)
- October 25 – Paul Ableman, English writer of erotic fiction and playwright (born 1927)
- November 1 – William Styron, American novelist (born 1925)
- November 6 – Nelson S. Bond, American writer (born 1908)
- November 9 – Ellen Willis, American journalist and critic (born 1941)
- November 10 – Jack Williamson, American science fiction author (born 1908)
- November 15 – George G. Blackburn MC, Canadian author (born 1917)
- November 20 – Donald Hamilton, Swedish-born American writer (born 1916)
- November 23
  - Jesús Blancornelas, Mexican journalist (born 1936)
  - Richard Clements, English journalist (born 1928)
- November 24
  - William Diehl, American author (born 1924)
  - Phyllis Fraser, American writer, publisher and actor (born 1916)
  - George W. S. Trow, American writer and media critic (born 1943)
- November 27 – Bebe Moore Campbell, American author (born 1950; (brain cancer))
- December 21 – Philippa Pearce, English children's writer (born 1920)
- December 26 – John Heath-Stubbs, English poet and translator (born 1918)

== Awards ==
- Nobel Prize in Literature: Orhan Pamuk
- 2006 Governor General's Awards: see article
- Astrid Lindgren Memorial Award: Katherine Paterson
- The Australian/Vogel Literary Award: Belinda Castles, The River Baptists
- Caine Prize for African Writing: Mary Watson, "Jungfrau"
- Camões Prize: José Luandino Vieira (declined)
- Compton Crook Award: Maria Snyder, Poison Study
- C. J. Dennis Prize for Poetry: John Tranter, Urban Myths: 210 Poems
- Edna Staebler Award for Creative Non-Fiction: Francis Chalifour, After
- Eric Gregory Award: Fiona Benson, Retta Bowen, Frances Leviston, Jonathan Morley, Eoghan Walls
- Europe Theatre Prize: Harold Pinter
- Friedenspreis des Deutschen Buchhandels: Wolf Lepenies
- Griffin Poetry Prize: Sylvia Legris, Nerve Squall, and Kamau Brathwaite, Born to Slow Horses
- James Tait Black Memorial Prize for fiction: Cormac McCarthy, The Road
- James Tait Black Memorial Prize for biography: Byron Rogers, The Man Who Went into the West: The life of R.S. Thomas
- Kenneth Slessor Prize for Poetry: Jaya Savige, Latecomers
- Lambda Literary Awards: Multiple categories; see 2006 Lambda Literary Awards.
- Man Booker Prize: Kiran Desai, The Inheritance of Loss.
- Miles Franklin Award: Roger McDonald, The Ballad of Desmond Kale
- National Book Award for Fiction: Richard Powers, The Echo Maker
- National Book Critics Circle Award: Kiran Desai, The Inheritance of Loss
- Orange Prize for Fiction: Zadie Smith, On Beauty
- PEN/Faulkner Award for Fiction: E. L. Doctorow, The March
- Pulitzer Prize for Fiction: Geraldine Brooks, March
- Premio Nadal: Eduardo Lago, Llámame Brooklyn
- Queen's Gold Medal for Poetry: Fleur Adcock
- SAARC Literary Award: Maitreyi Pushpa, Zahida Hina, Laxman Gaikwad, Tissa Abeysekara
- Scotiabank Giller Prize: Vincent Lam, Bloodletting and Miraculous Cures
- Wallace Stevens Award: Michael Palmer
- Whiting Awards: Fiction: Charles D’Ambrosio, Yiyun Li, Micheline Aharonian Marcom, Nina Marie Martínez, Patrick O’Keeffe; Plays: Stephen Adly Guirgis, Bruce Norris; Poetry: Sherwin Bitsui, Tyehimba Jess, Suji Kwock Kim

== See also ==
- List of literary awards
- List of poetry awards
- 2006 in Australian literature
- 2006 in comics

== Notes ==
- Hahn, Daniel (2015). The Oxford companion to children's literature (Second ed.). Oxford. ISBN 978-0-19-871554-2.
