= List of The New York Times number-one books of 2006 =

The American daily newspaper The New York Times publishes multiple weekly lists ranking the best selling books in the United States. The lists are split into three genres—fiction, nonfiction and children's books. Both the fiction and nonfiction lists are further split into multiple lists.

== Fiction ==
The following list ranks the number-one best selling fiction books, in the hardcover fiction category.

The most frequent weekly best seller of the year was For One More Day by Mitch Albom with 6 weeks at the top of the list.

Date	Book	Author
January 1	Mary, Mary	James Patterson
January 8	Mary, Mary	James Patterson
January 15	"S" Is for Silence	Sue Grafton
January 22	The Hostage	W. E. B. Griffin
January 29	The Da Vinci Code	Dan Brown
February 5	The Da Vinci Code	Dan Brown
February 12	Cell	Stephen King
February 19	Cell	Stephen King
February 26	Cell	Stephen King
March 5	The 5th Horseman	James Patterson and Maxine Paetro
March 12	The 5th Horseman	James Patterson and Maxine Paetro
March 19	The House	Danielle Steel
March 26	The 5th Horseman	James Patterson and Maxine Paetro
April 2	The Da Vinci Code	Dan Brown
April 9	The Da Vinci Code	Dan Brown
April 16	Gone	Jonathan Kellerman
April 23	Two Little Girls in Blue	Mary Higgins Clark
April 30	Two Little Girls in Blue	Mary Higgins Clark
May 7	Two Little Girls in Blue	Mary Higgins Clark
May 14	Two Little Girls in Blue	Mary Higgins Clark
May 21	Beach Road	James Patterson and Peter de Jonge
May 28	Beach Road	James Patterson and Peter de Jonge
June 4	Beach Road	James Patterson and Peter de Jonge
June 11	At Risk	Patricia Cornwell
June 18	The Husband	Dean Koontz
June 25	The Husband	Dean Koontz
July 2	The Husband	Dean Koontz
July 9	Twelve Sharp	Janet Evanovich
July 16	Twelve Sharp	Janet Evanovich
July 23	Twelve Sharp	Janet Evanovich
July 30	Angels Fall	Nora Roberts
August 6	Phantom	Terry Goodkind
August 13	Angels Fall	Nora Roberts
August 20	Judge and Jury	James Patterson and Andrew Gross
August 27	Judge and Jury	James Patterson and Andrew Gross
September 3	Judge and Jury	James Patterson and Andrew Gross
September 10	Judge and Jury	James Patterson and Andrew Gross
September 17	Rise and Shine	Anna Quindlen
September 24	The Book of Fate	Brad Meltzer
October 1	The Thirteenth Tale	Diane Setterfield
October 8	The Thirteenth Tale	Diane Setterfield
October 15	For One More Day	Mitch Albom
October 22	For One More Day	Mitch Albom
October 29	For One More Day	Mitch Albom
November 5	For One More Day	Mitch Albom
November 12	Lisey's Story	Stephen King
November 19	Dear John	Nicholas Sparks
November 26	Dear John	Nicholas Sparks
December 3	Cross	James Patterson
December 10	Cross	James Patterson
December 17	Cross	James Patterson
December 24	For One More Day	Mitch Albom
December 31	For One More Day	Mitch Albom

== Nonfiction ==
The following list ranks the number-one best selling nonfiction books, in the hardcover nonfiction category.

Date	Book	Author
January 1	Teacher Man	Frank McCourt
January 8	Team of Rivals	Doris Kearns Goodwin
January 15	Our Endangered Values	Jimmy Carter
January 22	My Friend Leonard	James Frey
January 29	For Laci	Sharon Rocha
February 5	For Laci	Sharon Rocha
February 12	Marley & Me	John Grogan
February 19	Marley & Me	John Grogan
February 26	Marley & Me	John Grogan
March 5	Marley & Me	John Grogan
March 12	Marley & Me	John Grogan
March 19	Marley & Me	John Grogan
March 26	Marley & Me	John Grogan
April 2	Marley & Me	John Grogan
April 9	Marley & Me	John Grogan
April 16	Marley & Me	John Grogan
April 23	Marley & Me	John Grogan
April 30	Don't Make a Black Woman Take off Her Earrings	Tyler Perry
May 7	Don't Make a Black Woman Take off Her Earrings	Tyler Perry
May 14	Marley & Me	John Grogan
May 21	Marley & Me	John Grogan
May 28	Marley & Me	John Grogan
June 4	Marley & Me	John Grogan
June 11	Marley & Me	John Grogan
June 18	Dispatches from the Edge	Anderson Cooper
June 25	Godless: The Church of Liberalism	Ann Coulter
July 2	Wisdom of Our Fathers	Tim Russert
July 9	Godless: The Church of Liberalism	Ann Coulter
July 16	Marley & Me	John Grogan
July 23	Marley & Me	John Grogan
July 30	Marley & Me	John Grogan
August 6	Marley & Me	John Grogan
August 13	Fiasco	Thomas E. Ricks
August 20	Fiasco	Thomas E. Ricks
August 27	Marley & Me	John Grogan
September 3	Marley & Me	John Grogan
September 10	I Feel Bad About My Neck	Nora Ephron
September 17	I Feel Bad About My Neck	Nora Ephron
September 24	I Feel Bad About My Neck	Nora Ephron
October 1	Marley & Me	John Grogan
October 8	I Feel Bad About My Neck	Nora Ephron
October 15	Culture Warrior	Bill O'Reilly
October 22	State of Denial	Bob Woodward
October 29	The Innocent Man	John Grisham
November 5	The Innocent Man	John Grisham
November 12	The Audacity of Hope	Barack Obama
November 19	The Audacity of Hope	Barack Obama
November 26	The Audacity of Hope	Barack Obama
December 3	The Audacity of Hope	Barack Obama
December 10	The Innocent Man	John Grisham
December 17	The Innocent Man	John Grisham
December 24	The Audacity of Hope	Barack Obama
December 31	The Audacity of Hope	Barack Obama

== See also ==
- Publishers Weekly list of bestselling novels in the United States in the 2000s
