= New Haven Review =

- Language: English

Publication details
- History: 2007-present
- Publisher: New Haven Literistic, Inc. (United States)
- Frequency: Quarterly

Standard abbreviations
- ISO 4: N. Hav. Rev.

Indexing
- ISSN: 1940-8722

Links
- Journal homepage

The New Haven Review is a not-for-profit quarterly literary journal founded in August 2007 and located in New Haven, Connecticut. Founded as The New Haven Review of Books, the magazine "was founded to resuscitate the art of the book review and draw attention to Greater New Haven-area writers." The scope of the journal has since expanded to include essays, fiction, poetry, reviews with an emphasis on neglected work, and visual art. Designed by Nicholas Rock, the journal is currently published in print and on the web, with daily postings from affiliated writers.

Prominent contributors have included National Book Award winner, Deirdre Bair, Pulitzer Prize winner, Debby Applegate, senior editor for The Atlantic, Ross Douthat, editor-in-chief of the Southwest Review Willard Spiegelman, executive director of the Dart Center for Journalism and Trauma Bruce Shapiro, and noted fiction writers Alice Mattison and Amy Bloom.

The New Haven Review was founded by an editorial collective composed of Mark Oppenheimer, Tom Gogola, Brian Francis Slattery, Susan Holohan, and Alison Moncrief. The publisher is Bennett Lovett-Graff and trustees include Debby Applegate, Bruce Tulgan, Pang-Mei Chang, the editors, and the publisher.
