= The Gangster's Life =

2011 novel by Ranj Dhaliwal

- Author: Ranj Dhaliwal
- Original title: The Gangster's Life
- Language: English
- Publisher: New Star Books Ltd.
- Publication date: October 2011
- Publication place: Canada
- Media type: Print, ebook
- Pages: 288 pages (paperback)
- ISBN: 9781554200597

The Gangster's Life (published in 2011) is a Canadian crime fiction novel by Ranj Dhaliwal.

== Synopsis ==
The Gangster's Life picks up the story of Indo–Canadian gangster Ruby Pandher, the hero of Ranj Dhaliwal's bestseller Daaku, as he recovers from a failed hit by his own associates.

Violence, wild partying and flashy purchases mark Ruby's comeback. Ruby's eyes and perspective are widened by the new contacts he makes, as he tries to measure up to - and then sideline big-time gangster Khalsi. Joining forces with a sinister associate and sounding very much like the modern businessman, he sets out to expand his criminal enterprises - all while battling his conscious and wondering what a life outside the underworld would be like.

Soon he comes to see his old self as minor-league, and, joining forces with the sinister Darshan and sounding very much like the modern businessman, he sets out to expand his criminal enterprises.

Meanwhile, life intervenes in the form of the possibility of love for this hardcore gangster; and in Ruby's brother Kam, who worships his bro' and wants to follow in his footsteps ––– something Ruby knows he's not equipped to do. Meanwhile, Ruby's activities pull him deeper into the violent side of the world of Sikh temple politics.

Will Ruby's heart open, or is the flashy lifestyle too much to tear away from? Can he stop Kam from following in his own footsteps? Most of all, can Ruby break the cycle and leave behind "The Life"?

== Reception ==
The Gangster's Life illustrates the almost impossible life outside the underworld when an organized crime figure tries to lead a legitimate life. The Gangster's Life examines the gang mentality of a fictional underworld crime boss who is involved in drug trafficking and targeted hits who wonders what a normal life would be like. The book is an eye-opener for those unacquainted with the world of B.C. gangs
