= The Darkness That Comes Before =

2004 novel by R. Scott Bakker

- Author: R. Scott Bakker
- Cover artist: David Rankine
- Language: English
- Series: Prince of Nothing
- Genre: Fantasy novel
- Publisher: Overlook Press (US) & Orbit (UK)
- Publication date: 2004
- Publication place: Canada
- Media type: Print (Hardback & Paperback)
- Pages: 604 pp (Overlook hardback)
- ISBN: 1-58567-559-8
- OCLC: 54529878
- Dewey Decimal: 813/.6 22
- LC Class: PR9199.4.B356 D37 2004
- Followed by: The Warrior Prophet

The Darkness That Comes Before is the first book in the Prince of Nothing series by R. Scott Bakker. It was published in 2004.

== Critical response ==
"Canadian author Bakker's impressive, challenging debut, the first of a trilogy, should please those weary of formulaic epic fantasy. Bakker's utterly foreign world, Eärwa, is as complex as that of Tolkien, to whom he is, arguably, a worthier successor than such established names as David Eddings and Stephen Donaldson."

–Publishers Weekly (starred review)

"[R. Scott Bakker is a] class act like George R. R. Martin, or his fellow Canadians Steven Erikson and Guy Gavriel Kay. He gets right away from the 'downtrodden youth becoming king' aspect of epic fantasy in his very impressive first novel - The Darkness That Comes Before, which will be published in the UK in April 2004. But he also reminds us of the out-and-out strangeness that fantasy can engender, in a way no one has since Clark Ashton Smith. No clunky analogy of medieval Europe here. Odd, fascinating characters in a world full of trouble and sorcery."

–"10 Authors to Watch," SFX Magazine

"The Darkness That Comes Before is something special... A stunning first book, brilliant setting and characterisation, and if this was just a warm-up then the entire series is going to set a new standard for fantasy writers everywhere. Go read it now, as the publisher's blurb proclaims - 'Something remarkable has begun..."

–The Alien Online

Jacek Dukaj reviewed it for Polish magazine Nowa Fantastyka.
