= The Aspect-Emperor =

2009–2017 novel series by R. Scott Bakker

The Aspect-Emperor is a four volume series of fantasy novels written by Canadian author R. Scott Bakker. It is part of his Second Apocalypse series, and takes place twenty years after the events of his debut trilogy The Prince of Nothing.

== Novels ==
1. The Judging Eye, 2009, ISBN 978-0-14-305160-2
2. The White-Luck Warrior, 2011, ISBN 978-0-14-305162-6
3. The Great Ordeal, 2016, ISBN 978-1-46-830169-4
4. The Unholy Consult, 2017, ISBN 978-1-84-149831-7

== Series ==
The first book, The Judging Eye, was released on January 20, 2009.

The planned title of the second book was originally The Shortest Path. However, Bakker later confirmed that it would be called The White-Luck Warrior. It was published in April 2011 in Canada by Penguin Group Canada. It was published in the UK in May 2011, by Orbit Books and in the US by The Overlook Press.

The planned title of the third book was originally The Horns of Golgotterath, but was changed The Great Ordeal. Due to the length of the manuscript the book was split into two volumes—the first being The Great Ordeal and the second The Unholy Consult. The first draft was completed on October 1, 2013 and the book was published July 12, 2016. The second part was published on July 6, 2017.

== Critical response ==
Adam Whitehead of The Wertzone gave The Unholy Consult a 4.5/5 rating and described the ending of the Aspect-Emperor series as "epic and impressive" with "tremendously satisfying character moments" and "Bakker's best-ever action scenes" despite being "perhaps less elegantly structured as a novel than some of its forebears".

In July 2019, Forbes contributor Erik Kain said that The Aspect Emperor as a whole was "a pretty massive letdown". His view was that "the first two books were good, but the second two fell apart rather badly. Still, the first three in this series tell a complete and satisfying story", concluded Kain.
