= Torsten Krol =

Australian writer resident in Queensland

Torsten Krol is an Australian writer resident in Queensland. He is the author of the FOREVERMAN series of novels (2018–2023). He is best known for his novels The Dolphin People (2006), a postmodern "parable" of a World War II-era German family lost in the South American jungle, and Callisto (2007), a "nightmarishly amusing" satire on post-9/11 American attitudes to terrorism, which was translated into 22 languages.

== Authorial controversy ==
Described as "reclusive", Krol does not make personal appearances to promote his work, and there has been media speculation about his identity; among others, The Sunday Star-Times and ABC's The Book Show have questioned whether he might be a better-known author writing under a pseudonym.

In April 2018, a few days prior to the publication of Krol's new novel series, FOREVERMAN, a German author published a piece of non-fiction literary criticism postulating possible identities of Torsten Krol.

There are only two known interviews with Torsten Krol, the first of which was granted to Harper Perennial in conjunction with its publication of Callisto in the United States, and the second of which was granted to novelist Steven S. Drachman for Audere Magazine in June 2019.

== Bibliography ==
Year	Title	Publisher	Print
2006	The Dolphin People	Harper Perennial	ISBN 978-1-84354-576-7
2007	Callisto	Harper Perennial	ISBN 978-1-84354-576-7
2012	Secret Book of Sacred Things	Corvus	ISBN 978-1-84354-579-8
2018	FOREVERMAN	Platinum Needle	
2018	FOREVERMAN: Exilium	Platinum Needle	
2018	FOREVERMAN: Quantum Blood	Platinum Needle	
2018	FOREVERMAN: Terminus	Platinum Needle	
2018	FOREVERMAN: Olympus	Platinum Needle	
2018	FOREVERMAN: Darkness Primeval	Platinum Needle	
2018	Randall Priest	Platinum Needle	
2019	Krakbrayn	Platinum Needle	
2021	FOREVERMAN: Nevermore	Platinum Needle	
2022	Piper	Platinum Needle	
2023	FOREVERMAN: Juggernaut	Platinum Needle	
2024	FOREVERMAN: The Wind From Tomorrow	Platinum Needle	
