= The Warrior Prophet (novel) =

2005 book by R. Scott Bakker

- First edition
- Author: R. Scott Bakker
- Audio read by: David DeVries
- Language: English
- Series: Prince of Nothing
- Genre: Fantasy
- Published: 2005
- Publisher: Overlook Press
- Media type: Print (hardback, paperback), e-book, audiobook
- Pages: 640 pages
- ISBN: 1585675601
- Preceded by: The Darkness That Comes Before
- Followed by: The Thousandfold Thought

The Warrior Prophet is the second book in the Prince of Nothing series by R. Scott Bakker. It was first published in hardback on January 13, 2005 through The Overlook Press and was released in paperback in 2008. It was preceded by the 2003 book The Darkness That Comes Before and the trilogy concluded in 2006 with The Thousandfold Thought.

== Synopsis ==
A battle has been waged against the heathen Fanim, but the Holy War is far from over and infighting has led to tension and delays. Meanwhile Kellhus has been patiently gaining a stronger following.

== Reception ==
Critical reception has been mostly positive and the novel has received praise from Publishers Weekly and the Edmonton Journal. In her review for the SF Site, Victoria Strauss rated The Warrior Prophet favorably, praising Bakker for his "meticulous world building" and "delving unflinchingly into the exalted heights and seamy depths of human nature". The Bookseller favorably compared Bakker to Anne Rice and George R. R. Martin, also stating that "Dense and demanding are not terms you would use to describe most commercial fantasy, but I feel they are the very reasons why this should sell well." The Guardian was slightly mixed in their review, writing that the book suffered from Bakker having only one year to write the novel and that "The Warrior Prophet is a good book; with more stringent editing, it could have brilliant. That said, it still leaves most of the competition trailing."
