= What I Know For Sure =

Memoir by Tavis Smiley

What I Know For Sure: My Story of Growing Up in America
- Author: Tavis Smiley
- Language: English
- Publication place: United States
- ISBN: 0-385-50516-7

What I Know For Sure: My Story of Growing Up in America is a best-selling memoir by African-American journalist Tavis Smiley and co-written with David Ritz. The authors published it through Doubleday on October 10, 2006.

== Contents ==
Smiley discusses his difficult childhood—being the oldest in a poverty-stricken family of 13 with a deeply religious Pentecostal mother and a father who beat him. He goes on to achieve a long career in journalism.

== Reviews ==
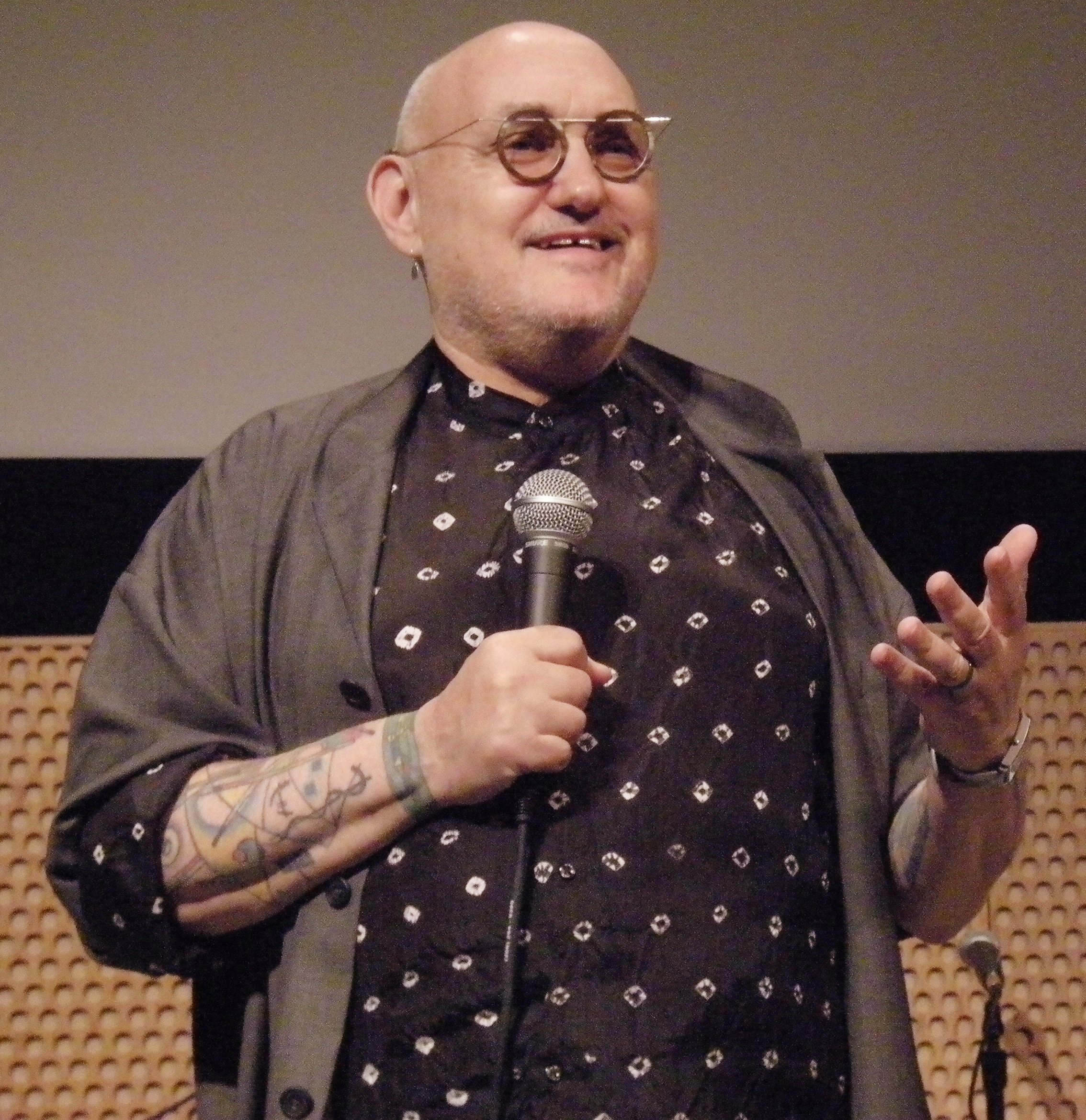
Co-writer David Ritz in 2008

Writing website Curled Up With A Good Book praised the book, with reviewer Jilian Vallade stating, "Smiley’s story is told in a clear, easy-to-read style that is at once compelling and inviting." Vallade also commented that Smiley's "ability to overcome his childhood experiences and achieve success makes him an excellent role model in these times when there are so few."

The New York Times published a mostly positive review by journalist Lawrence Downes. He called the book "an entirely plausible, unwittingly honest portrait of a natural-born talk-show host, and how he got that way". He praised Smiley's frankness about his past, but Downes also remarked that the book includes:

[...] page after page of supposedly verbatim dialogue from decades ago – when Smiley was a year old, or in grade school, or even when he wasn't around to hear. [...] the authors [...] approached the project with a disturbingly easygoing attitude toward quotation marks. Smiley calls his book What I Know for Sure, but I wouldn't take that literally if I were you.

== See also ==
- 2006 in literature
