= Soul, Mind, Body Medicine =

2006 book by Zhi Gang Sha

Soul, Mind, Body Medicine: A Complete Soul Healing System for Optimum Health and Vitality
- Title page for Soul, Mind, Body Medicine: A Complete Soul Healing System for Optimum Health and Vitality (2006)
- Author: Zhi Gang Sha
- Language: English
- Genre: Self-Help
- Publication date: 2006

Soul, Mind, Body Medicine: A Complete Soul Healing System for Optimum Health and Vitality is a self-help book written by spiritual healer Zhi Gang Sha which provides a controversial interpretation of Traditional Chinese medicine and quantum physics. Published in 2006, within three weeks of its release the book was placed in the top five of The New York Times Best Seller list.

== See also ==
- Self-healing
