= Bruce Tulgan =

American writer (born 1967)

Bruce L. Tulgan
- Born: June 27, 1967 (age 59); Pittsfield, Massachusetts, United States
- Education: B.A. magna cum laude J.D.
- Alma mater: Amherst College; New York University School of Law
- Occupations: Author, professional speaker, management-trainer
- Spouse: Debby Applegate
- Website: www.rainmakerthinking.com

Bruce L. Tulgan (born June 27, 1967) is an American writer specializing in management training and generational diversity in the workforce.

His books include The Art of Being Indispensable at Work (2020), Not Everyone Gets a Trophy (updated and revised, 2016; first edition published 2009), The 27 Challenges Managers Face (2014), It's Okay to Be the Boss (2007), and Managing Generation X (revised and updated 2000; first edition published 1995).

He founded the management training firm RainmakerThinking, Inc. in 1993 and is a keynote speaker, seminar leader, and business consultant.

== Early life and education ==
Tulgan was born in Pittsfield, Massachusetts in 1967 and earned a B.A. magna cum laude from Amherst College and a J.D. from the New York University School of Law.

Before founding RainmakerThinking, Inc. in 1993, Tulgan practiced law at the Wall Street firm of Carter, Ledyard & Milburn. He is still a member of the Bar in Massachusetts and New York.

== Books ==
Tulgan has written over 20 books, including:

- The Art of Being Indispensable at Work: Win Influence, Beat Overcommitment, and Get the Right Things Done (2020)
- Not Everyone Gets a Trophy: How to Manage the Millennials (revised and updated, 2016; first edition published 2009)
- Bridging the Soft Skills Gap (2015)
- The 27 Challenges Managers Face (2014)
- It's Okay to Be the Boss (revised and updated, 2014; first edition published 2007)
- It's Okay to Manage Your Boss (2010)
- Not Everyone Gets a Trophy (2009)
- Winning the Talent Wars (2001)
- Managing Generation X (revised and updated, 2000; first edition published 1995)

== RainmakerThinking ==
Bruce Tulgan founded RainmakerThinking, Inc. as a management research, training and consulting firm. It is located in New Haven, Connecticut and is the leading authority on generational issues in the workplace.

RainmakerThinking, Inc. continues to pursue three longitudinal workplace studies:

- The Great Generational Shift in the Workforce (since 1993): Monitoring the impact of generational change.
- Leadership, Management, and Supervision (since 1995): Cataloguing management challenges and the best tools and techniques for solving those challenges.
- Human Capital Management (since 1997): Cataloguing best practices in staffing, recruiting, selection, performance management, rewards, retention, succession planning, and leadership development.

Hundreds of thousands of individuals from different organizations have participated in their research since 1993.

Based on this ongoing research, RainmakerThinking, Inc. has provided custom research, training, and consulting services for more than 300 different organizations ranging from the United States Army to Wal-Mart.

As well as being an author and consultant, Bruce Tulgan also provides keynote speeches and workshops through RainmakerThinking Since 1995, Bruce has worked with thousands of leaders and managers in organizations ranging from Aetna to Wal-Mart; from the U.S. Army to the YMCA. Bruce was named by Management Today as one of the few contemporary figures to stand out as a “management guru” and he was named to the 2009 Thinkers 50 rising star list.

On August 13, 2009, Bruce accepted Toastmasters International's most prestigious honor, the Golden Gavel. This is presented annually to a single person who represents excellence in the fields of communication and leadership. Past winners have included Stephen Covey, Zig Ziglar, Deepak Chopra, Tony Robbins, Ken Blanchard, Tom Peters, Art Linkletter, Dr. Joyce Brothers, and Walter Cronkite. It also provides an online training service: RainmakerLearning.

== Personal life ==
Tulgan continues his lifelong study of Okinawan Uechi Ryu Karate Do and holds a seventh degree black belt, making him a Kyoshi master of the style. He lives with his wife Debby Applegate in New Haven, Connecticut. Applegate is the author of The Most Famous Man in America: The Biography of Henry Ward Beecher, for which she won the 2007 Pulitzer Prize for Biography or Autobiography.

== Recognition ==
- 2009 Golden Gavel award from Toastmasters International. This honor is annually presented to a single person. Past winners have included Marcus Buckingham, Stephen Covey, Deepak Chopra, and Tom Peters.
- Named to the 2009 Thinkers 50 rising star list (also known as the Guru Radar).

== As a media resource ==
Bruce writes regularly for such sources as Training Magazine , The Huffington Post, and TD Magazine. His writing has appeared in various magazines and newspapers, including in The New York Times, USA Today, and HR Magazine.

His work has also been the subject of many news stories, including in print publications such as Bloomberg Businessweek and Fortune, radio programs including NPR's All Things Considered, television programs including NBC's The Today Show, and online publications such as ABC News.com.
