= The Heart of a Cult =

American Novel

- First edition cover
- Author: Lena Phoenix
- Publisher: Garuda
- Publication date: September 1, 2006
- ISBN: 978-0-978-54830-8

The Heart of a Cult is a novel by American author Lena Phoenix, first published September 1, 2006. It was inspired by her personal experiences in the alternative spiritual realm. The book is written in the style of a personal diary and a segment of the life of thirty-year-old Michelle Thomson, who, during a period of unemployment, goes to a spiritual seminar. The seminar experience leads her into the depths of a cult, from which she must win her freedom, leading to the narrator's growth.

The Heart of a Cult won the Independent Publisher's 2007 Visionary Fiction Silver Medal.

== Publication information ==
- Lena Phoenix. The Heart of a Cult. Garuda: 2006. ISBN 978-0-9785483-0-8.
