= Tim Russert =

American lawyer and TV journalist (1950–2008)

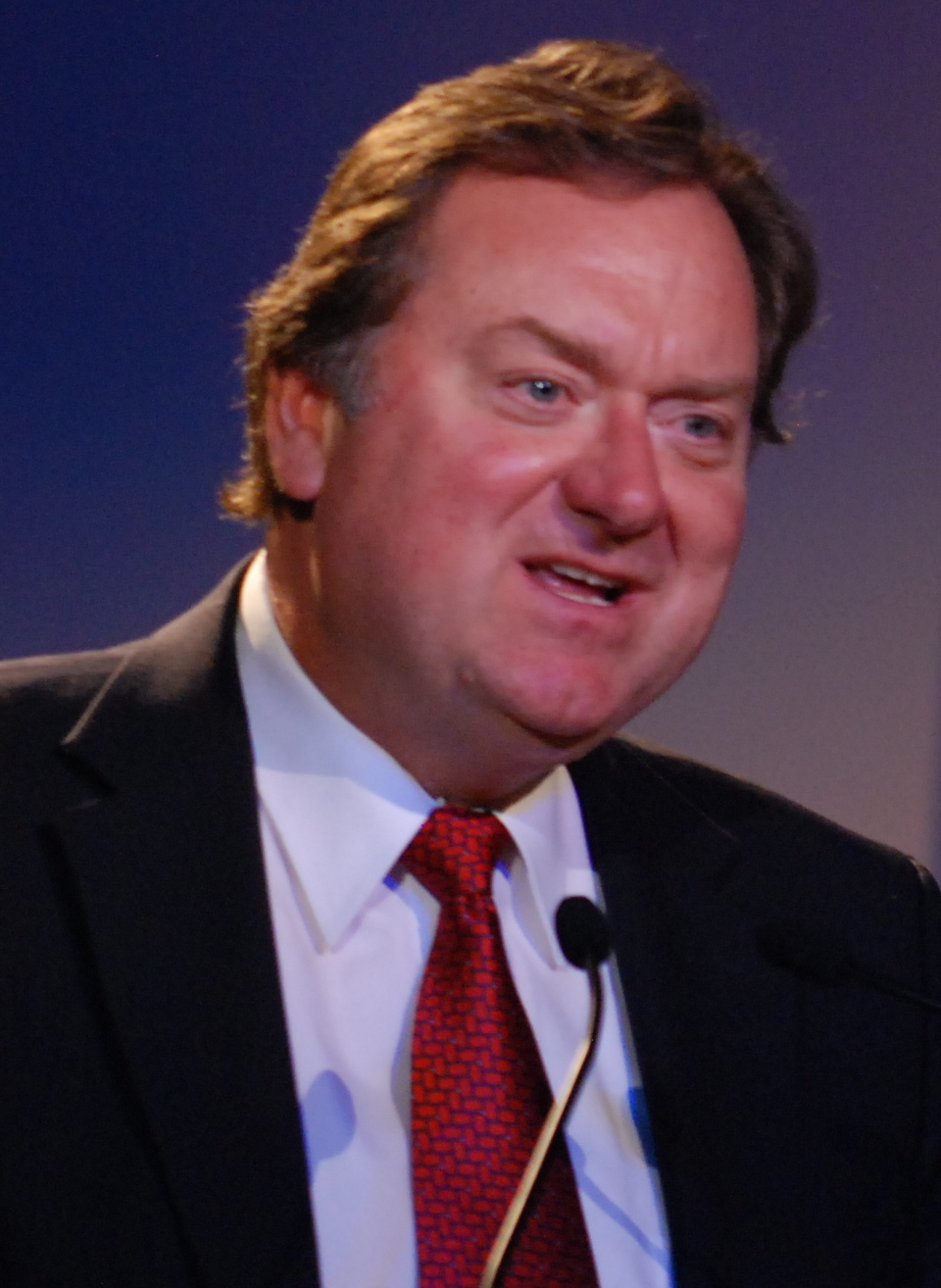
- Russert in October 2007
- Born: Timothy John Russert; May 7, 1950; Buffalo, New York, U.S.
- Died: June 13, 2008 (aged 58); Washington, D.C., U.S.
- Resting place: Rock Creek Cemetery; Washington, D.C., U.S.
- Education: John Carroll University (BA); Cleveland State University (JD)
- Occupation: Journalist
- Years active: 1983–2008
- Spouse: Maureen Orth (m. 1983)
- Children: Luke Russert
- Website: MSNBC Biography

Timothy John Russert (May 7, 1950 – June 13, 2008) was an American television journalist and lawyer who appeared for more than 16 years as the longest-serving moderator of NBC's Meet the Press. He was a senior vice president at NBC News and Washington bureau chief, and also hosted an eponymous CNBC/MSNBC weekend interview program. He was a frequent correspondent and guest on NBC's The Today Show and Hardball. Russert covered several presidential elections, and he presented the NBC News/Wall Street Journal survey on the NBC Nightly News during the 2008 U.S. presidential election. Time magazine included Russert in its list of the 100 most influential people in the world in 2008. Russert was posthumously revealed as a 30-year source for syndicated columnist Robert Novak.

== Early life ==
Russert was born on May 7, 1950, in Buffalo, New York. His mother, Elizabeth "Betty" (née Seeley; January 9, 1929 – August 14, 2005), was a homemaker, and his father, Timothy Joseph "Big Russ" Russert (November 29, 1923 – September 24, 2009), a sanitation worker. Elizabeth and Joseph were married for 30 years, before separating in 1976. Russert was the only son and the second of four children; his sisters are Betty Ann (B.A.), Kathleen (Kathy) and Patricia (Trish). His parents were Catholics, and he had German and Irish ancestry. He received a Jesuit education from Canisius High School in Buffalo.

He graduated BA in 1972 from John Carroll University, then Juris Doctor with honors from the Cleveland State University College of Law in 1976. Russert commented on Meet the Press that he went to Woodstock "in a Buffalo Bills jersey with a case of beer." While in law school, an official from his alma mater, John Carroll University, called Russert to ask if he could book some concerts for the school as he had done while a student. He agreed, but said he would need to be paid because he was running out of money to pay for law school. One concert that Russert booked was headlined by a then-unknown singer, Bruce Springsteen, who charged $2,500 for the concert appearance. Russert told this story to Jay Leno when he was a guest on The Tonight Show on NBC on June 6, 2006. John Carroll University has since named its Department of Communication and Theatre Arts in Russert's honor.

== Professional career ==
=== Political ===
Prior to becoming host of Meet the Press, Russert ran one of U.S. Senator Daniel Moynihan's five major offices, based in Buffalo, New York. He later served as special counsel and as chief of staff to Moynihan, a Democrat from Hell's Kitchen, New York. In 1983, he became a top aide to New York governor Mario Cuomo, also a Democrat.

=== NBC News: Washington bureau chief and host of Meet the Press ===
Russert joined NBC as an executive, and did not expect to appear on television. He was hired by NBC News's Washington bureau in 1984 and became bureau chief by 1989. Russert became host of the Sunday morning program Meet the Press in 1991, and was the longest-serving host of the program. Its name was changed to Meet the Press with Tim Russert, and, at his suggestion, expanded to an hour in 1992. The show also shifted to a greater focus on in-depth interviews with high-profile guests, where Russert was known for extensive preparatory research and cross-examining style. One approach he developed was to find old quotes or video clips that were inconsistent with guests' more recent statements, present them on-air to his guests and then ask them to clarify their positions. With Russert as host the audience grew to more than four million viewers per week, and it was recognized as one of the most important sources of political news. Time magazine named Russert one of the 100 most influential people in the world in 2008, and Russert often moderated political campaign debates.

== Political coverage and debates ==
During NBC's coverage of the 2000 presidential election, Russert calculated possible Electoral College outcomes using a whiteboard (now in the Smithsonian Institution) on the air and memorably summed up the outcome as dependent upon "Florida, Florida, Florida." TV Guide described the scene as "one of the 100 greatest moments in TV history." Russert again accurately predicted the final battleground of the presidential election of 2004: "Ohio, Ohio, Ohio." In the course of the debate leading up to that election, Russert used February 2004 interviews with the two candidates to home in on the paradoxical fact (and the possible consequences for democracy) of their both apparently having been members of Yale University's Skull and Bones secret society. On the MSNBC show Tucker, Russert predicted the battleground states of the 2008 presidential election would be New Mexico, Colorado, Arizona and Nevada, saying, "If Democrats can win three of those four, they can lose Ohio and Florida, and win the presidency."

=== Red states and blue states ===
According to The Washington Post, the phrases red states and blue states were coined by Tim Russert, although in that same article Russert states that he wasn't the first to use the terminology. This term refers to those states of the United States of America whose residents predominantly vote for the Republican Party (red) or Democratic Party (blue) presidential candidates, respectively. John Chancellor, Russert's NBC colleague, is credited with using red and blue to represent the states on a US map for the 1976 presidential election, but at that time Republican states were blue, and Democratic states were red. (How the colors got reversed is not entirely clear.) During the 1984 presidential election, between Ronald Reagan and Walter Mondale, ABC News used a map which showed Republican states as red and Democratic states as blue. According to David Brinkley, that was because Red = R = Reagan. Mainstream political discussion following the 2000 presidential election used red state/blue state more frequently.

=== CIA leak scandal ===
In the Plame affair, Scooter Libby, convicted chief of staff for Vice President Dick Cheney, told special prosecutor Patrick Fitzgerald that Russert told him of the identity of Central Intelligence Agency officer Valerie Plame (who was at the time married to former ambassador Joseph C. Wilson). Russert testified previously, and again in United States v. I. Lewis Libby, that he would neither testify whether he spoke with Libby nor would he describe the conversation. Russert did say, however, that Plame's identity as a CIA operative was not leaked to him. Russert testified again in the trial on February 7, 2007. According to The Washington Post, Russert testified that "when any senior government official calls him, they are presumptively off the record," saying: "when I talk to senior government officials on the phone, it's my own policy our conversations are confidential. If I want to use anything from that conversation, then I will ask permission."

At the trial, the prosecution asserted that a Federal Bureau of Investigation agent had called Russert regarding Russert's phone call with Libby, and that Russert had told the agent that the subject of Plame had not come up during his conversation with Libby. Russert was posthumously revealed as a thirty-year source of columnist Robert Novak, whose original article revealed Plame's affiliation with the CIA. In a Slate.com article, Jack Shafer argued that "the Novak-Russert relationship poses a couple of questions. [...] Russert's long service as an anonymous source to Novak...requires further explanation." In a posthumous commentary, the L.A. Times wrote that, "Like former New York Times reporter Judith Miller, Russert was one of the high-level Washington journalists who came out of the Libby trial looking worse than shabby." The article's author, Tim Rutten, argued that although Russert and NBC had claimed that these conversations were protected by journalistic privilege, "it emerged under examination [that] Russert already had sung like a choirboy to the FBI concerning his conversation with Libby—and had so voluntarily from the first moment the Feds contacted him. All the litigation was for the sake of image and because the journalistic conventions required it."

=== Iraq War ===
In the lead-up to the Iraq War, Meet the Press featured interviews with top government officials including Vice President Dick Cheney. CBS Evening News correspondent Anthony Mason praised Russert's interview techniques: "In 2003, as the United States prepared to go to war in Iraq, Russert pressed Vice President Dick Cheney about White House assumptions." However, Salon.com reported a statement from Cheney press aide Cathie Martin regarding advice she says she offered when the Bush administration had to respond to charges that it manipulated pre-Iraq War intelligence: "I suggested we put the vice president on Meet the Press, which was a tactic we often used. It's our best format." David Folkenflik quoted Russert in his May 19, 2004, Baltimore Sun article:

I don't think the public was, at that time, particularly receptive to hearing it," Russert says. "Back in October of 2002, when there was a debate in Congress about the war in Iraq—three-fourths of both houses of Congress voted with the president to go. Those in favor were so dominant. We don't make up the facts. We cover the facts as they were.

Folkenflik went on to write:

Russert's remarks would suggest a form of journalism that does not raise the insolent question from outside polite political discourse—so, if an administration's political foes aren't making an opposing case, it's unlikely to get made. In the words of one of my former editors, journalists can read the polls just like anybody else.

In the 2007 PBS documentary, Buying the War, Russert commented:

My concern was, is that there were concerns expressed by other government officials. And to this day, I wish my phone had rung, or I had access to them.

=== 2008 presidential debate ===
At the February debate, Russert was criticized for what some perceived as disproportionately tough questioning of Democratic presidential contender Hillary Clinton. Among the questions, Russert had asked Clinton, but not Obama, to provide the name of the new Russian president (Dmitry Medvedev). This was later parodied on Saturday Night Live. In October 2007, liberal commentators accused Russert of harassing Clinton over the issue of supporting drivers' licenses for illegal immigrants.

== Enthusiasm for sports ==
Russert grew up as a New York Yankees fan, switching his allegiance to the Washington Nationals when they were established in Washington, D.C. Russert held season tickets to both the Nationals and the Washington Wizards and was elected to the board of directors of the Baseball Hall of Fame in Cooperstown, New York in 2003.

A lifelong fan of the Buffalo Bills football team, Russert often closed Sunday broadcasts during the football season with a statement of encouragement for the franchise. The team released a statement on the day of his death, saying that listening to Russert's "Go Bills" exhortation was part of their Sunday morning game preparation. He once prayed publicly on the show with his father when the Bills were going for the Super Bowl for the fourth consecutive time before Super Bowl XXVIII. On July 23, 2008, U.S. Route 20A leading to the Bills' Ralph Wilson Stadium in Orchard Park, New York was renamed the "Timothy J. Russert Highway".

Russert was also a Buffalo Sabres fan and appeared on an episode of Meet the Press next to the Stanley Cup during a Sabres playoff run. While his son was attending Boston College, he often ended Meet the Press with a mention of the success of various Boston College sports teams.

While a student at the Cleveland–Marshall College of Law, Russert attended Ten Cent Beer Night, a promotion by the Cleveland Indians which ended in a riot at the stadium. "I went with $2 in my pocket," he recalled. "You do the math."

== Author ==
In 2004 Russert penned a best-selling autobiography, Big Russ and Me, which chronicled his life growing up in the predominantly Irish-American working-class neighborhood of South Buffalo and his education at Canisius High School. Russert's father Timothy Joseph Russert, "Big Russ", was a World War II veteran who held down two jobs after the war, emphasized the importance of maintaining strong family values, the reverence of faith, and never taking a short cut to reach a goal. Russert claimed to have received over 60,000 letters from people in response to the book, detailing their own experiences with their fathers. He released Wisdom of Our Fathers: Lessons and Letters from Daughters and Sons in 2005, a collection of some of these letters. This book also became a best-seller.

== Cameo television appearance ==
Russert made a cameo appearance in 1995 on the critically acclaimed police drama, Homicide: Life on the Street. He played the cousin of fictional Baltimore homicide detective Megan Russert. He was mentioned by name again on the show in 1996, when it was said that he had introduced his "cousin" to a French diplomat, with whom she then went abroad. Homicide executive producer Tom Fontana attended the same Buffalo high school as Russert.

== Awards ==
During his career, Russert received 48 honorary doctorates and won several awards for excellence in journalism:

- Paul White Award from the Radio-Television News Directors Association (2009),
- John Peter Zenger Freedom of the Press Award
- American Legion Journalism Award
- Veterans of Foreign Wars News Media Award,
- Congressional Medal of Honor Society Journalism Award
- Allen H. Neuharth Award for Excellence in Journalism
- David Brinkley Award for Excellence in Communication
- Catholic Academy for Communication's Gabriel Award
- 2005 Emmy Award for coverage of the funeral of former President Ronald Reagan.
- 2005 Golden Plate Award of the American Academy of Achievement presented by Awards Council member Michael Bloomberg.

Minor planet 43763 Russert is named in his honor.

== Personal life ==
Russert met Maureen Orth at the 1980 Democratic National Convention; they married in 1983 at the Basilica de San Miguel in Madrid, Spain. Orth has been a special correspondent for Vanity Fair since 1993.

Russert delivered the 2007 Washington University in St. Louis commencement speech.

Their son, Luke, graduated from Boston College in 2008. He hosted the XM Radio show 60/20 Sports with James Carville, and was an intern with ESPN's Pardon the Interruption and NBC's Late Night with Conan O'Brien. On July 31, 2008, NBC News announced that Luke Russert would serve as an NBC News correspondent covering the youth perspective on the 2008 United States presidential election.

The Russert family lived in northwest Washington, D.C., and also spent time at a vacation home on Nantucket Island, where Tim served on the board of several non-profit organizations. In an interview in the 2010 documentary Mister Rogers & Me, he spoke of his admiration for his friend Fred Rogers, host of the iconic PBS children's program "Mister Rogers' Neighborhood" whom he and his family met on Nantucket.

Russert, a devout Catholic, said many times he had made a promise to God to never miss Sunday Mass if his son were born healthy. In his writing and in his news reporting, Russert spoke openly and fondly of his Catholic school education and of the role of the Catholic Church in his life. He was an outspoken supporter of Catholic education on all levels. Russert said that his father, a sanitation worker who never finished high school, "worked two jobs all his life so his four kids could go to Catholic school, and those schools changed my life." He also spoke warmly of the Catholic nuns who taught him. "Sister Mary Lucille founded a school newspaper and appointed me editor and changed my life," he said. Teachers in Catholic schools "taught me to read and write, but also how to tell right from wrong."

Russert also contributed his time to numerous Catholic charities. He was particularly devoted and concerned for the welfare of street kids in the United States and children who died from street violence. He told church workers attending the 2005 Catholic Social Ministry Gathering that "if there's an issue that Democrats, Republicans, conservatives and liberals can agree on, it's our kids."

Shortly before his death, he had an audience with Pope Benedict XVI.

Russert shared a friendship with musician Jimmy Buffett. The day after Russert's death, June 14, 2008, Buffett dedicated his final encore song to Russert's wife and son: "I'm going to send this song out tonight to my dear friend, Maureen Orth, and Luke Russert for the passing of my dear friend, Tim, who was a great guy and a great Parrothead, and... I think all you do in situations like that is you carry on the way you know they would want you to do it. This show is for Tim tonight."

== Death ==
At the time of his death, Russert had just returned from a family vacation in Rome, Italy, to celebrate his son's graduation from Boston College. While his wife and son were still in Rome, Russert had returned to prepare for his Sunday television show.

Shortly after 1:30 p.m. on Friday, June 13, 2008, Russert collapsed at the offices of WRC-TV, which houses the Washington, D.C., bureau of NBC News where he was chief. He was recording voiceovers for the Sunday edition of Meet the Press. In a speech he gave at the Kennedy Center, Brian Williams said that Russert's last words were, "What's happening?" spoken as a greeting to NBC Washington bureau editing supervisor Candace Harrington as he passed her in the hallway. He then walked down the hallway to record voiceovers in a soundproof booth and collapsed. A co-worker began to perform CPR on him. The District of Columbia Fire and Rescue service received a call from NBC at 1:40 p.m. and dispatched an emergency medical services unit which arrived at 1:44 p.m. Paramedics attempted to defibrillate Russert's heart three times, but he did not respond. Russert was then transported to Sibley Memorial Hospital, arriving at 2:23 p.m., where he was pronounced dead. He was 58 years old.

External videos
- NBC News announcement of Russert's death by Tom Brokaw, June 13, 2008

In accordance with the American journalistic standard established in the 1950s, the public announcement of Russert's death was withheld by the wire services and his network's competitors until Russert's family had been notified. Retired NBC Nightly News anchor Tom Brokaw then delivered, live on NBC, CNBC, and MSNBC, the breaking news of his death. NBC Nightly News anchor Brian Williams was on assignment in Afghanistan and could not anchor the special report. CBS and ABC also interrupted programming to report Russert's death. Armen Keteyian reported the news for CBS and Charles Gibson reported for ABC.

Russert's longtime friend and physician, Dr. Michael Newman, said that his asymptomatic coronary artery disease had been controlled with medication (LDL-C was <70 mg/dL) and exercise, and that he had performed well on a stress test on April 29 of that year. An autopsy performed on the day of his death determined that his history of coronary artery disease led to a myocardial infarction (heart attack) and ventricular fibrillation with the immediate cause being an occlusive coronary thrombosis in the left anterior descending artery resulting from a ruptured cholesterol plaque.

Russert is buried at Rock Creek Cemetery. The Newseum in Washington, D.C., exhibited a recreation of Russert's office with original elements such as his desks, bookshelves, folders, loose leaf papers and notebooks. In August 2014, the exhibit was disassembled at the Newseum and transported to the Buffalo History Museum. The exhibit entitled "Inside Tim Russert's Office: If it's Sunday It's Meet the Press", opened in October 2014 with Luke Russert and others giving opening remarks. The exhibit can be viewed during the normal business hours of the Buffalo History Museum.

=== Reaction ===
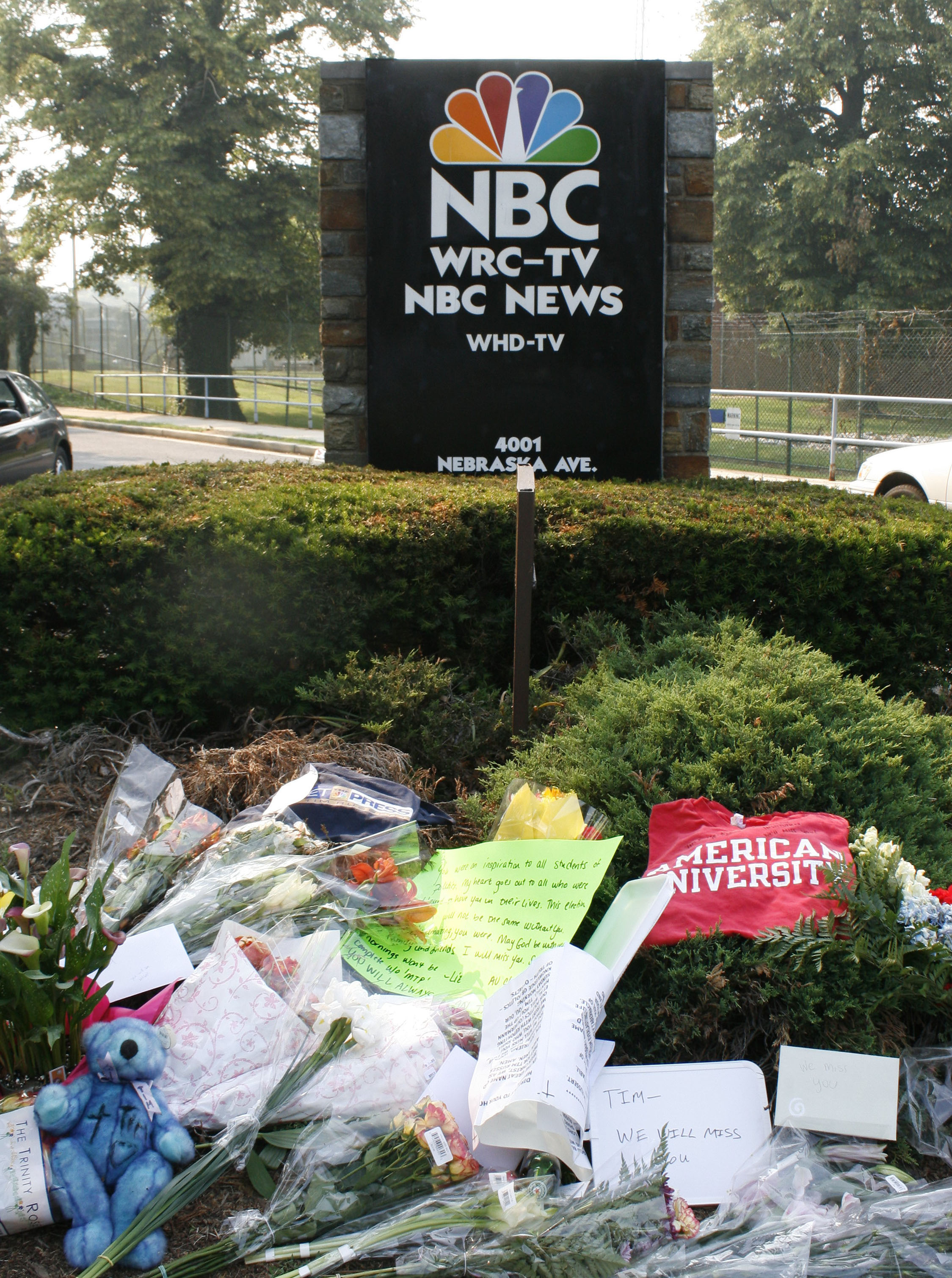
A makeshift memorial at WRC-TV, the site of studios for Meet the Press

External videos
- Tim Russert Memorial Service, June 18, 2008, C-SPAN

On the evening of his death, the entire, nearly commercial-free half-hour of NBC Nightly News was dedicated to Russert's memory. Bill and Hillary Clinton released a joint statement saying Russert "had a love of public service and a dedication to journalism that rightfully earned him the respect and admiration of not only his colleagues but also those of us who had the privilege to go toe to toe with him." Many of his colleagues in both newspaper and television reporting also offered tribute to Russert in this and other programs. Other major news agencies, including CBS, ABC, CNN, Fox News, and the BBC spent large segments of their programming on June 13 reporting about Russert's life and career. President George W. Bush stated in a news conference with French president Nicolas Sarkozy: "America lost a really fine citizen yesterday when Tim Russert passed away. I've had the privilege of being interviewed by Tim Russert. I found him to be a hardworking, thorough, decent man. And Tim Russert loved his country, he loved his family, and he loved his job a lot." Bruce Springsteen, a friend of Russert's, gave an on-stage tribute to him while performing in Cardiff, Wales, on June 14 and again at Russert's televised Kennedy Center memorial service, calling him "an important irreplaceable voice in American journalism" and offering condolences to his family. On the June 13, 2008, episode of Late Night with Conan O'Brien, O'Brien simply walked onto the stage at the start of the show. Instead of his usual upbeat antics and monologue, O'Brien announced that he had just received news about the sudden death of his good friend, fellow NBC employee and frequent Late Night guest Tim Russert. O'Brien proceeded to show two clips of his favorite Russert Late Night moments.

Mark Leibovich of The New York Times Magazine wrote in his book, This Town: Two Parties and a Funeral—Plus, Plenty of Valet Parking!—in America's Gilded Capital, about how Russert's funeral in many ways became a spectacle of some of Washington's worst cultural characteristics, largely centering on self-interest and posturing, while feigning remorse for the loss of the deceased. Some attendees even went as far as handing out business cards and vying for good seating. Mika Brzezinski of MSNBC's Morning Joe dubbed the scene "a new low, even for Washington tackiness".

== Career timeline ==
Political career

- 1977–1982 – chief of staff to Daniel Patrick Moynihan
- 1983–1984 – counselor to Mario Cuomo

Broadcast career

- 1984–1988 – senior vice president of NBC News' Washington operations
- 1995 – Homicide: Life on the Street (cameo appearance as self, but as fictitious cousin of Captain Megan Russert)
- 1988–2008 – Washington bureau chief of NBC News
- 1991–2008 – moderator of Meet the Press
- 1992–2006 – co-anchor of NBC News' election night coverage

Debates moderated

- 1991 – Ex-Gov. Edwin Edwards and State Rep. David Duke, candidates for Governor of Louisiana
- 1994 – Gov. Lawton Chiles and Jeb Bush, candidates for Governor of Florida
- 1998 – Sen. Bob Graham vs. State Sen. Charlie Crist, candidates for U.S. Senate from Florida
- January 2000 – in New Hampshire involving Republican candidates for President
- January 2000 – in New Hampshire involving Democratic candidates for President
- 2000 – Bill McCollum vs. Bill Nelson, candidates for U.S. Senate from Florida
- September 2000 – in Buffalo Rep. Rick Lazio and First Lady Hillary Clinton, candidates for U.S. Senate from New York
- October 2000 – involving candidates for U.S. Senate from Florida
- 2002 – Bill McBride and Gov. Jeb Bush, candidates for Governor of Florida
- 2002 – Shannon O'Brien vs. Mitt Romney, candidates for Governor of Massachusetts
- 2004 – Betty Castor and HUD Secretary Mel Martinez, candidates for U.S. Senate from Florida
- October 2005 – A.G. Jerry Kilgore and Lt. Gov. Tim Kaine, candidates for governor of Virginia
- November 2006 – in Orlando Sen. Bill Nelson and Rep. Katherine Harris, candidates for U.S. Senate from Florida
- September 2007 – in New Hampshire involving Democratic candidates for U.S. President
- October 2007 – (co-moderator) of debate in Philadelphia involving Democratic candidates for U.S. president
- January 2008 – in Boca Raton, Florida, involving Republican candidates for President
- January 2008 – in Las Vegas, Nevada, involving Democratic candidates for President
- March 2008 – (co-moderator) at Cleveland State between Sen. Hillary Clinton and Sen. Barack Obama, Democratic candidates for U.S. President

Media offices
Preceded by Garrick Utley	Meet the Press Moderator; December 8, 1991 – June 8, 2008	Succeeded by Tom Brokaw
