= 365 Penguins =

2006 children's book

- First edition
- Author: Jean-Luc Fromental
- Original title: 365 Pingouins
- Translator: Maggie Lehrman
- Illustrator: Joelle Jolivet
- Cover artist: Joelle Jolivet
- Language: French
- Genre: Children's literature, picture-book
- Published: 2006 (Naïve Livres) (French); 2006 (Abrams Books for Young Readers) (English)
- Publication place: France
- Media type: Print (hardback)
- Pages: 44 (unpaginated)
- ISBN: 978-08-1094460-2
- OCLC: 70176775

365 Penguins is a 2006 children's book by Jean-Luc Fromental and illustrated by Joelle Jolivet which tells the story of a family who receives a penguin each day for a year. It was a Boston Globe-Horn Book Honor Award winner.

== Plot ==
On the morning of New Year's Day a family - Ted (the narrative), Amy, and their parents - receives an anonymous package containing a penguin and a note which says "I'm number 1. Feed me when I'm hungry."(pages 4,5) The family then receives a penguin a day for 365 days. The book discusses the problems the family experiences, including feeding and housing penguins, and in Summer, heat (which the penguins don't like), noise and the smell. After a time, the family appears to accept their lot, "You live penguin. You think penguin. You dream penguin. You become penguin."(pages 34,35) By the time of New Year's Eve there are 365 penguins in the house and the family is forced to celebrate outside. After midnight Uncle Victor, an ecologist, arrives and explains that the penguins' South Pole habitat is shrinking due to melting ice caps so he decided to introduce them to the North Pole. But as endangered species can't be exported he sent the family a penguin a day, alternating between a male and a female. Uncle Victor then takes all the penguins except Chilly, a cute penguin with blue feet, who the family agrees to look after. The story ends when the next day a very large package arrives containing a polar bear and a note similar to the first penguin note.

== Publication history ==
- 365 Pingouins, 2006, France, Naïve Livres ISBN 9782350210483
- 365 Penguins, 2006, USA, Abrams Books for Young Readers ISBN 9780810944602

== Reception ==
365 Penguins has generally received positive reviews. Kirkus Reviews called it "A comic episode equally suited to sharing with one child or a lunchroom full of children." while Publishers Weekly found "Comical math problems and an ecological message form a memorable counterpoint in Fromental's story" Inis magazine described it as "A feast for the mind, as well as for the eyes."

The New York Times saw "The retro pictures in black, white, orange and blue recall the days when full-color printing was prohibitively expensive and illustrators had to use their ingenuity. Here, the black-and-white penguins make a cheerful contrast to the orange people, blue furniture and — often — the chaotic mischief the penguins get up to." and "gets top marks in math and art, but it flunks ecology." The School Library Journal wrote "This hilarious, oversize picture book integrates challenging math concepts and environmental concerns into a clever narrative." and "Light on facts, but full of fun, this story has potential for many more math applications."

In 2007 it received a Boston Globe–Horn Book Award honor.

== In education ==
365 Penguins is in The Reading Agency's Chatterbooks Winter Activity Pack. and appears throughout the world in school and government reading lists. It is also used to teach mathematics.
