= Nina Marie Martínez =

American novelist

- Born: San Jose, California, U.S.
- Education: University of California, Santa Cruz
- Occupation: Novelist
- Children: 1
- Writing career
- Notable awards: Whiting Award (2006)

Nina Marie Martínez (born San Jose, California) is an American novelist.

== Life ==
She dropped out of high school, but graduated from the University of California, Santa Cruz.

She lived in Northern California.

She lives in Santa Cruz with her daughter.

== Awards ==
- 2006 Whiting Award

== Works ==
- "Game:La Lotería De Don Clemente", The Believer, March 2004
- Caramba!. Random House, Inc. 2005. ISBN 978-0-385-72152-3.
