= Ranj Dhaliwal =

Canadian author

Ranj Dhaliwal ਰਣਜ ਧਾਲੀਵਾਲ
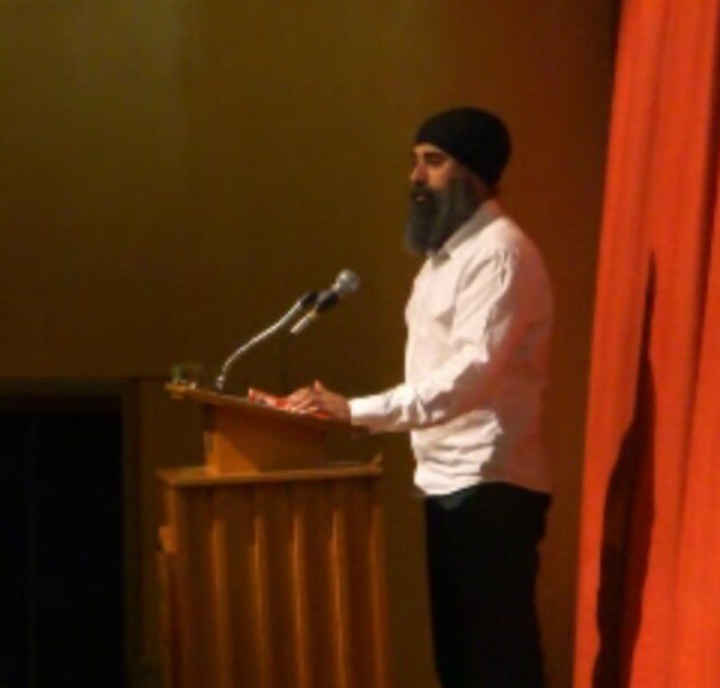
- Born: Ranj Dhaliwal; 1976/1977; Vancouver, British Columbia, Canada
- Occupation: Writer
- Writing career
- Period: 2006–present
- Genre: Crime fiction
- Website: www.ranjdhaliwal.com

Ranj Dhaliwal (Punjabi: ਰਣਜ ਧਾਲੀਵਾਲ; born 1976/1977) is a Canadian author.

== Early life ==
Born in Vancouver, Dhaliwal grew up in Surrey Central, British Columbia in the 1980s, which was a time when Indo-Canadian families were scattered across the suburbs. Unfortunately this was a time when minorities were subjected to discrimination and racism, which Dhaliwal faced firsthand.

During his youth, Dhaliwal grew up with kids that at the early age of 13 were packing guns, stealing cars, getting into fights, making alliances, and selling drugs at school with police always close by watching the beginning of the Indo-Canadian gang culture rise.

== Personal life ==
Ranj Dhaliwal is a Sikh. He and his wife live in Surrey, British Columbia and have three sons.

== Writing career ==
In 2006, Dhaliwal's first novel Daaku was published. The release of Dhaliwal's novel was the subject of controversy in the South Asian community for breaking the code of silence in the Indo-Canadian community, though not based on a true story.

In 2011, Dhaliwal's second novel Daaku: The Gangster's Life was published.

Ranj Dhaliwal is currently working on his third novel Gangland, which is predicted to be released in 2016. A fourth novel Gang Related is also in the works and set to be released in coming years.

== Community and politics ==
Dhaliwal was praised as an important community leader by the Walrus magazine in his bid to gain control of a controversial Sikh temple in Surrey, BC that was involved in a violent and bloody clash between fundamentalists and moderates over edicts from the head priest of Sikhs. Dhaliwal was elected in and became the Vice-President elect of the temple in 2008. He then resigned to focus his attention on at-risk youth while a litigious battle ensued in the courts over his slate's election.

Dhaliwal continues to be involved in politics in Surrey and coordinates youth programs. Because of his active involvement in the community, Ranj has been called upon to mediate local disputes and conflicts. His involvement in politics isn't just locally, as Dhaliwal brings Sikh leaders from India to tour Canadian Sikh temples.

Dhaliwal has worked with aboriginal and environmental law organizations for many years, and volunteers with several organizations aimed at helping at-risk youths. Dhaliwal speaks on organized crime at high schools and universities, and alongside police officers in an effort to educate youth about the dangers of the gangster lifestyle.

== Bibliography ==
Order of Release	Title	Year	Page Count	Notes
1.	Daaku	2006	312	Print ISBN 9781554200276, ebook ISBN 9780987811905
2.	The Gangster's Life	2011	288	Print ISBN 9781554200597
