= Prince of Nothing =

Series of fantasy novels by R. Scott Bakker

The Prince of Nothing
- The Darkness That Comes Before (2003); The Warrior Prophet (2004); The Thousandfold Thought (2006)
- Author: R. Scott Bakker
- Country: Canada
- Language: English
- Genre: Fantasy novel
- Publisher: Overlook Press (US) & Orbit (UK)
- Published: 2003 - 2006
- Media type: Print (Hardback & Paperback)

The Prince of Nothing is a series of three fantasy novels by Canadian author R. Scott Bakker, first published in 2004, part of a wider series known as The Second Apocalypse. This trilogy details the emergence of monastic warrior Anasûrimbor Kellhus, and was followed by the four-book series The Aspect-Emperor.

Bakker has mentioned that this series was primarily influenced by the works of J. R. R. Tolkien and Frank Herbert.

== Novels ==
=== Prince of Nothing series ===
- The Darkness That Comes Before (2003)
- The Warrior Prophet (2004)
- The Thousandfold Thought (2006)

=== The Aspect-Emperor ===
- The Judging Eye (2009)
- The White-Luck Warrior (2011)
- The Great Ordeal (2016)
- The Unholy Consult (2017)

== Background ==
The Prince of Nothing series takes place in the fictional continent of Eärwa, which is separated from another continent to the east (mentioned but unseen), called Eänna. The main inhabitants of Eärwa are human, but were preceded by the Nonmen (or Cûnuroi), immortal beings who went mad with the accumulation of centuries of memory, and the Inchoroi, alien beings who crash-landed in northern Eärwa. These creatures' machinations led both to the downfall of the Nonmen and, with the aid of a group of human sorcerers known as the Consult, the summoning of Mog-Pharau, the No-God. This event, known as the First Apocalypse, caused the collapse of most of human civilization, but was stopped by the efforts of the sorcerer Seswatha and Anasûrimbor Celmomas, the last of a line of royalty. Society was eventually rebuilt after this event, which became more legend than history. Nonetheless, the Consult still endeavored to bring back the No-God and finish the plan they had begun thousands of years before.

The action of the series is confined to the Three Seas area, home of multiple human nations, ethnicities, and religions. The first novel opens with the start of a Holy War, pitting the Inrithi kingdoms and the Thousand Temples against the "heathen" Fanim, followers of a prophet who broke from Inrithism hundreds of years previously. The goal of the war is to retake Shimeh, a city venerated by both faiths, although as the war progresses its goal is subtly warped from the inside by the machinations of Anasûrimbor Kellhus.

== Characters ==
The novels follow the point of view of several characters on the Inrithi side of the Holy War. Most of the characters are of the Ketyai ethnicity, common to the western and eastern Three Seas. Their surnames usually precede their given names, like the order commonly used in Hungary, China, and Japan.

- Drusas Achamian is a member of the Mandate School, who joins the Holy War by order of his superiors. There, he meets and teaches Anasûrimbor Kellhus in secret, while slowly discovering his place in the coming Second Apocalypse. Achamian also meets his old students Nersei Proyas, Prince of Conriya, and Krijates Xinemus, the Marshal of Attrempus.
- Esmenet is a whore in the city of Sumna, and is Achamian's lover. She follows him into the Holy War and falls under the influence of Kellhus along with Achamian.
- Anasûrimbor Kellhus is the mysterious Dûnyain warrior whose power over those around him brings him control of the Holy War and its people. He was sent by his sect to find his father, Anasûrimbor Moënghus, who lives in the city of Shimeh, the Holy War's destination.
- Cnaiür urs Skiötha is a Scylvendi barbarian chieftain of the Utemot tribe, whose relationship with Moënghus 30 years previously makes him the only character with knowledge of the Dûnyain. He is also the first to meet Kellhus, and accompanies him to Momemn to join the Holy War.
- Sërwe is a slave claimed by Cnaiür as a prize, and who is used by Kellhus to control Cnaiür.
- Ikurei Conphas is a prideful Nansur general and nephew to that nation's Emperor. His victories over the Scylvendi make him the foremost choice for leader of the Holy War, before Cnaiür takes that position from him.
- Anasûrimbor Moënghus is Kellhus' father, and left the Dûnyain 30 years before the series begins.

== Historical influences ==
R. Scott Bakker drew upon many cultures as inspiration—notably Hellenistic Greece, Scythia, the Byzantine Empire, and other European and Middle Eastern cultures—for the Three Seas region of Eärwa.

== The Aspect-Emperor ==
The Second Apocalypse series is continued in the Aspect-Emperor tetralogy, which describes events taking place 20 years after the conclusion of Prince of Nothing. The first book of the series is The Judging Eye, and was first published in 2009. The second is The White-Luck Warrior and was published in 2011. The third is The Great Ordeal, published in 2016. Finally, the fourth is The Unholy Consult, published in 2017.
