= Drugs and Democracy in Rio de Janeiro =

History book

Drugs and Democracy in Rio de Janeiro: Trafficking, Social Networks, and Public Security
- Author: Enrique Desmond Arias
- Original title: Drugs and Democracy in Rio de Janeiro:Trafficking, Social Networks, and Public Security
- Language: English
- Subject: Anthropology and Sociology
- Genre: History
- Published: October 2006
- Publication place: USA
- Pages: 1-279
- ISBN: 978-0-8078-5774-8
- OCLC: ssj0000141621

Drugs and Democracy in Rio de Janeiro: Trafficking, Social Networks, and Public Security is a book by Enrique Desmond Arias published by the University of North Carolina Press in 2006. This book takes an interdisciplinary approach to understand public security, government operations, and drug related operations in Rio de Janeiro's favelas. Enrique Desmond Arias travels to Brazil to investigate the main reasons for a dramatic surge in crime, and he is also interested in figuring out what can be done.

His main focus is the intertwined relationships among all the different agents in Rio de Janeiro: governments, police, drug organizations, and the civilians caught in the cross hairs of the violence. Desmond Arias suggests that ethnographic research on Rio de Janeiro's crime problems must be approaches in a more complex method than what has already been done. His research in Rio de Janeiro is essential in providing an alternative solution to reducing crime that does not involve a higher military presence in the favelas or other conventional approaches taken by Brazilian governments to try and mitigate crime.

As the city of Rio polarizes itself and segregates communities, the wealthier Brazilians in Rio move into gated communities and begin walling off themselves from the much poorer Brazilians who are pushed to the peripheries of Rio. As the impoverished communities grow, their density allows crime to rise as there is less public security assigned to these unofficial shantytowns by the local governments. This has allowed drug traffickers to take control of these areas and expand their drug related operations.

As a result, local governments have tried to minimize crime, but the highly militarized police presence in these shantytowns has only led to wars between the police and anyone who may live in the favelas. Corruption is also another factor that contributes to the chaos, and Desmond Arias notes that these networks that connect the government and drug organizations is the main reason Rio cannot move out of this continuous violent state. Desmond Arias travels to three large favelas in the outskirts of Rio de Janeiro. The three favelas he spends his time are Tubarao, Santa Ana, and Vigario Geral. His work is primarily empirical research while he stays with people of the favelas and intimate interviews with people who are general citizens of the favela populations.

== Synopsis ==
In the first page of the introduction he explains what Rio de Janeiro's social violence is like up until the time of his research. Rio de Janeiro's people have now been forcibly segregated by their income, and those who have been pushed out the favelas are now under drug trafficking organizations' jurisdiction. Desmond Arias makes a distinction of the main agents who are simultaneously the perpetrators and victims of this violence, "impoverished, poorly educated, non-white, adolescents and young men."

Desmond Arias suggests that violence in Rio is not the ineffective policies or inability of Brazilian leaders to govern the people, but it is a mixture of the several factors that look at policy, relationships among different agents, and the inequality in Brazil. He makes an extremely important note in the introduction of the approaches ethnographers, anthropologists, and sociologists have taken when researching Rio's problems.

According to Desmond Arias there are two conventional and widely accepted approaches to approaching Rio's crime problem where the divided city approach and the neo-clientelism approach. The divided city approach is an assumption that there is a stark difference between drug trafficking organizations and the local governments they are at war with. This approach suggests that there is no close relationships among the two agents and the hostile adversity among them can be traced back to the 80s after the transition from the dictatorship. This approach alludes to a weak Brazilian state incapable of governing and policing its own people.

In response to the violence perpetrated by the drug trafficking organizations, the military police retaliate with their own violence and it fuels the never ending conflict among them. While this holds some truth, Desmond Arias believes this is incomplete and universally acceptable for all favelas and agents. The other approach suggested by Desmond Arias is the neo-clientalism approach that believes there is deeply-rooted intimate relationships among favela leaders and local politicians engaged in mutually beneficial relationships. As the drug trafficking organizations bribe politicians and police to conduct their regular illicit activities, politicians are re-elected and they collect bribes, and on the other hand the drug trafficking organizations are not as heavily policed by the state.

Desmon Arias' nine years in Rio are very important because he deviates away from these two approaches as the strict methods for understanding Brazil. He believes that one or the other cannot be fully encompassing of the complex relationships, violence, and inequality in Brazil. Although he is more leaning to the neo-clientilism approach, he believes that people, communities, and outside factors produce a much more complex reality.

=== Tubarao, Santa Ana, and Vigario Geral ===
In his time at these favelas he looks at the main political agents associated with each favela. He thoroughly explains the geography of each of the favelas and describes their creation over time. Tubarao is located near a wealthy area of Rio, has not been neglected like other favelas, and generally has a decent relationship with government officials and the people. At the same time, this is one of the most violent favelas in Rio. Its murder rate has been increasing quickly over the years. Santa Ana is different from Tubarao. It is closer to an industrial region populated mostly by working-class people in Rio. This favela is further from the core of Rio and police are known for their corruption. Vigário Geral has a dense afro-Brazilian population.

Each of these favelas has a different economic situation, yet they all are plagued by corruption and violence by drug trafficking organizations, police and elected officials. Arias does intimate and careful interviews of the people in these favelas. His research reveals corruption and violence that the people feel first-hand. His work aims to aid understanding the differences among the actors to which readers are introduced in the beginning of the book. His research is also reflective of his approach to Rio. He understands that the relationships among all actors is more complicated than people are used to seeing in Rio.

Lastly, Desmond Rias alludes that although Rio's situation may seem bleak there are possibilities of a better future. He proposes a solution that may mitigate some of the violence and corruption in Rio. Desmond Arias believes a more transparent network between local governments and the people would help some issues such as corruption and by doing so, the network between the drug trafficking organizations and politicians would dissolve power from corrupt officials and drug trafficking leaders.

== Critical reception ==
Review by Bryan McCann in The Americas 64 (2007): 308-309.

Review by Anthony W. Pereira in the Journal of Latin American Studies 39 (2007): 885-887.

Review by Barbara Hudson in the British Journal of Criminology 48 (2009): 108-110.

== Reviews ==
"A remarkably-researched political ethnography of social violence in the hyper-violent drug-infested world of Brazilian favelas. . . . Intrepid and sophisticated."—Qualitative Sociology

"A refreshing antidote to the earnest but misleading dichotomies of much official discourse. . . . Arias adds a distinctive voice . . . in terms of his subject matter, theoretical perspective, and methods."—Journal of Latin American Studies

"A path-breaking book that will change the way we understand Rio de Janeiro and other cities plagued by the territorial control of violent criminal networks."—The Americas

"Arias is to be applauded for his courageous and sustained research in very difficult locations, and for his evident humanity and concern for the residents of the favelas."—British Journal of Criminology

"This book is a major contribution to the scholarly discussion on urban violence in Latin America."—Latin Americanist

"Accessibly written and tightly argued, this book should reorient social science and policy debates on its topic, and will find wide adoption across a range of courses."—CHOICE

Democracy Rio de Janeiro State Violence
