= Maria Snyder =

American artist

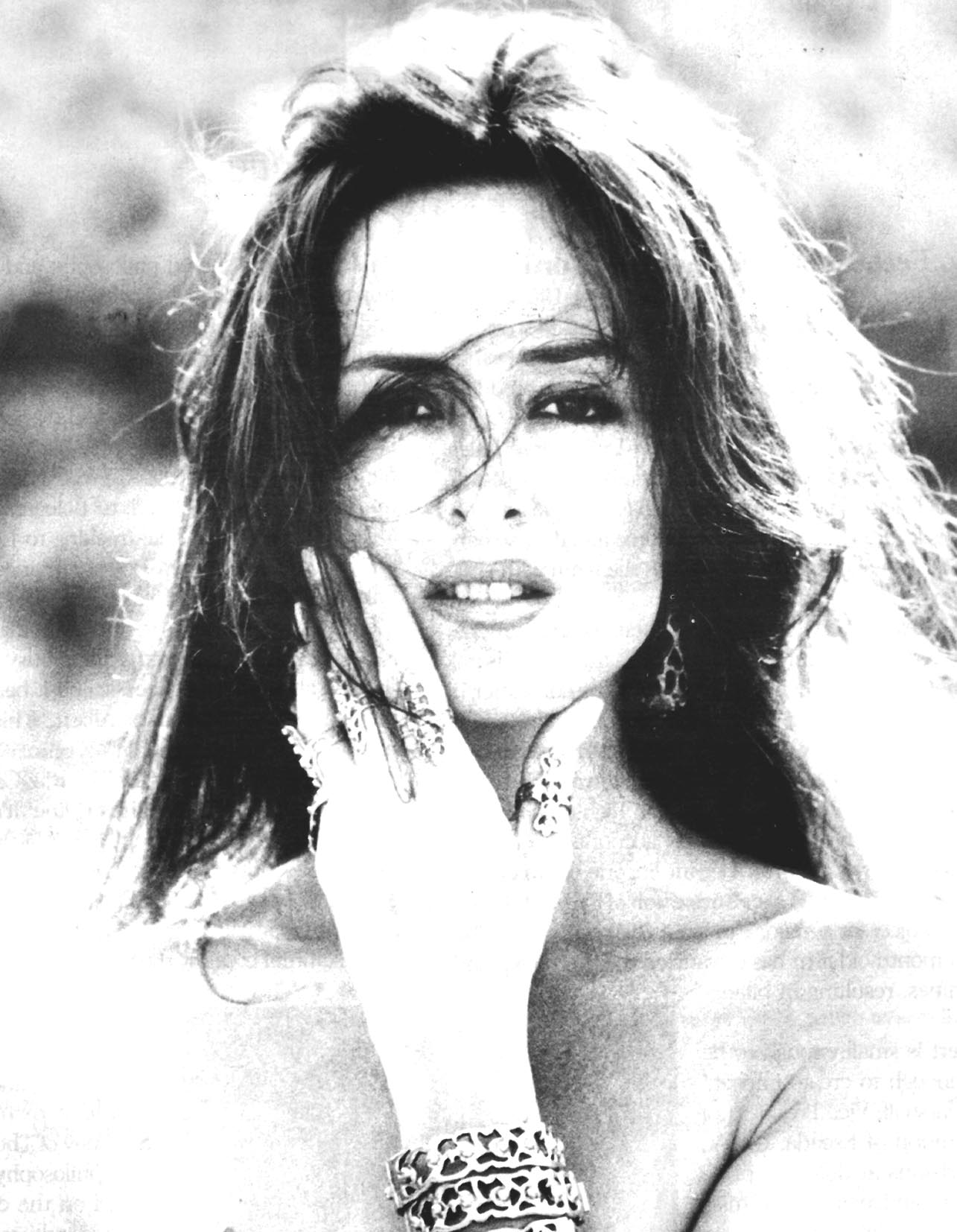
- Occupations: Artist, designer, model, entrepreneur
- Website: www.mariasnyder.com

Maria Snyder is an artist, designer, model, activist, and entrepreneur. Snyder's artistic background began in her youth as a painter and sculptor. She is the daughter of industrialist real estate developer, Arthur T. Snyder, who was an early pioneer in the revitalization of Portland, Maine. Snyder attended school in Athens, Greece, studied at the American University in Paris and received a master's degree in 20th Century Art History.

== Modeling career ==
While in Paris, Snyder was discovered by Yves Saint Laurent, after Marisa Berenson introduced her to Saint Laurent's muse, Loulou de la Falaise. Snyder quickly rose to fame within the fashion industry as one of Saint Laurent's chosen models. This launched an international modeling career and work with designers Karl Lagerfeld, Valentino, Gianni Versace, Moschino, Armani, Emanuel Ungaro, Calvin Klein and Geoffrey Beene. She has also worked with photography giants Helmut Newton, Steven Meisel, and Matthew Rolston and worked closely with legendary David LaChapelle. Snyder was a muse to celebrated artist Alex Katz and to one of the greatest fashion illustrators in history, Antonio Lopez. She is featured as the cover art of Lopez's book, "Antonio's People". After moving to New York, Andy Warhol encouraged Snyder's art. When embarking on a fashion career, Warhol remarked that "A photo of you is all people need to see to launch your career." Snyder was also featured in Norma Kamali's campaign with Andie MacDowell and Dolce & Gabbana's campaign with Monica Bellucci. Snyder was immortalized in the Dick Tracy comic strips as the inspiration for the "designing woman" character in the series.

== Fashion career ==
Snyder's career in fashion was spearheaded by Anouk Aimée's daughter, Manuela Papatakis. She introduced Snyder to Diane von Fürstenberg, who gave Snyder her first exhibition featuring her jewelry as art. Snyder's pieces, which included both costume and fine jewelry, were shown in Estee Lauder and Revlon advertising campaigns. Snyder then launched a fashion business. She developed collections featuring hand painted silk, elegant bead work and graphic prints. She showcased her collections in Paris and New York and began shipping to specialty and department stores around the globe. She also worked on a line of jewelry for Emilio Pucci and created fanciful bracelets for New York's Museum of Modern Art. Felissimo then partnered with Snyder and featured her wearable art and jewelry collections. Snyder was hailed by Felissimo for being "one of the first designers to introduce an exclusive eco collection from recycled materials." Her designs were worn by celebrities, models and aristocrats including: Madonna, Rosie O'Donnell, Cindy Crawford, Christie Brinkley, Anne Hearst, Mrs. Henry Ford, Princess Olga of Greece and Princess Marie Chantal of Greece.

== Message brands ==
Snyder's most recent brands, Eco Boys and Girls, EcoBrands, A Message of Love and IAM, deliver messages of environmental awareness and interconnectedness. In 2010, Snyder launched Eco Boys and Girls, an educational tool for children to learn, engage and participate with simple but direct messages of love, peace and environmental awareness. Eco Boys and Girls premiered at the Liberty Science Center in Jersey City, New Jersey on April 24, 2010. Since then, the National Education Association (NEA) has adopted Eco Boys and Girls lesson plans into their curriculum. The NEA and Friends of the United Nations have also welcomed the Eco Boys and Girls as pro-environmental advocates. The NEA's Green Across America Program features the Eco Boys and Girls as icons. In 2011, Eco Boys and Girls were featured presenters in Grand Central Terminal's Earth Day 2011 celebration, as well as featured partners at American Renewable Energy Day 2011 in Aspen, Colorado, August 2011.

In addition, the Eco Boys and Girls short film has been selected to present at Global Peace Film Festival, Sustainable Planet Film Festival, Artivist Film Festival and presented at American Renewable Energy Day. Friends of the United Nations presents Eco Boys and Girls, the Millennium Kids at the United Nations to share awareness of UN Millennium Goals. In September, 2010 the Association of Science and Technology Centers presented the Eco Boys and Girls as participants in their call to action for science education to support the Millennium Development Goals.

== Leadership ==
Snyder is receiving increasing recognition as "Leading a New Generation of Artists for Peace". In 2009 the Fulbright Center featured Snyder's HeartsUnite painting at The Global Symposium of Peaceful Nations in Washington, D.C. Her MandalaLoveBubbles triptych artwork is on permanent display at the Medical City Children's Hospital in Dallas, Texas. The American Public Health Association (APHA) at the annual conference in Philadelphia, Pennsylvania, describes Snyder's art "as an emerging body of work that spans graphic, advertising, and fine arts in techniques and media while discussing the challenges of bringing images and ideas about peace into the modern mainstream after decades of marginalization." Snyder's 35-foot (11 m) mural, Wall Of Peace'n Love, was installed in the entranceway to the new Medical City Children's Hospital in Dallas, Texas. Maria Snyder was a speaker on her PeaceART at the Newark Peace Education Summit. Her discussion Global Call to Action through PeaceART is a project that helps empower children around the world through art and action, utilizing murals, film, and prose.

== Honors, boards, awards ==
Tiffany and Co. announced Snyder as "One of America's Hottest Fashion Designers" along with Isaac Mizrahi and Anna Sui. She has been recognized by the Encyclopedia of Costume Jewelry as "one of the few top jewelry designers to collect." Snyder has been nominated to the Council of Fashion Designers of America and the International Best Dressed List. She has been named Ambassador of Arts to the Middle East Peace Civic Forum and is an advisory board member to the International Committee against Mental Illness.
