= R. Scott Bakker =

Canadian writer (born 1967)

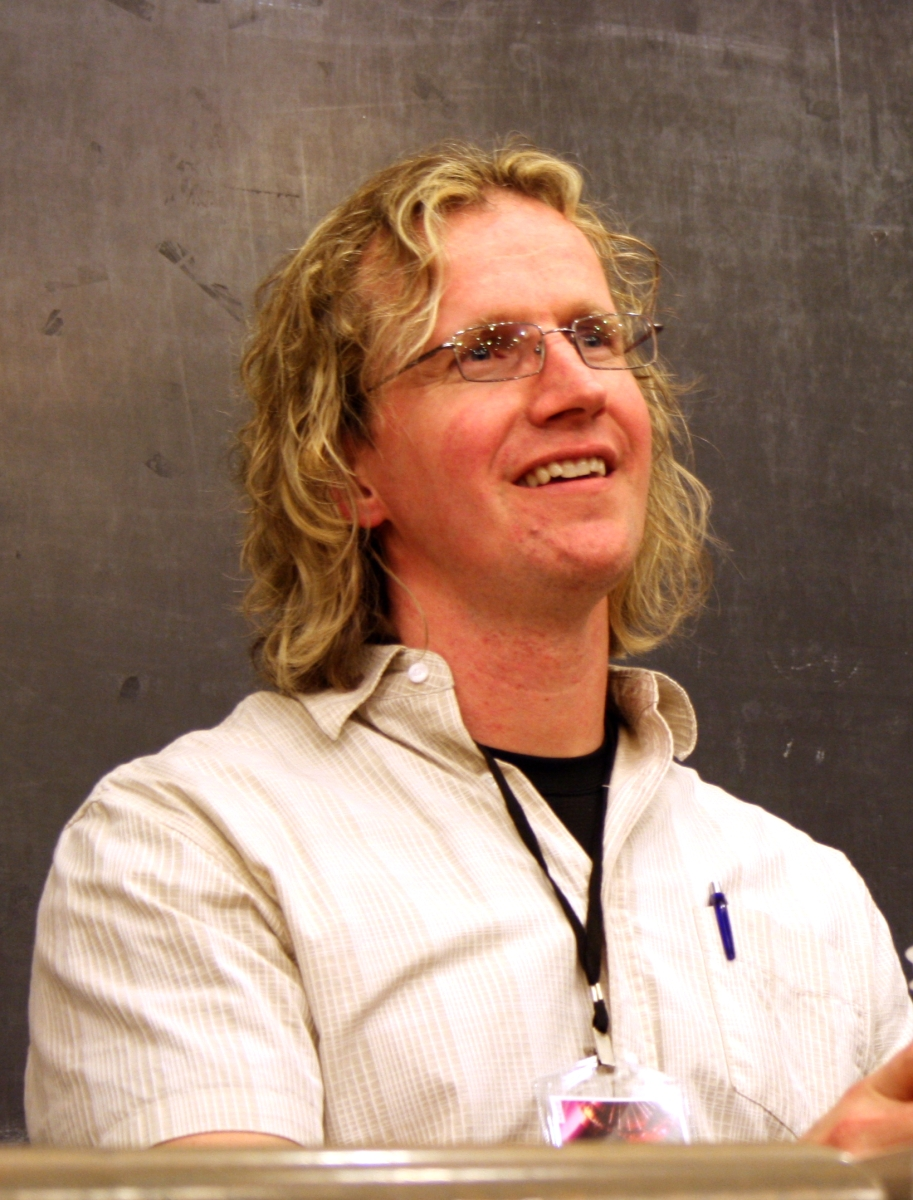
- Bakker at SFeraKon 2009
- Born: February 2, 1967 (age 59); Simcoe, Ontario, Canada
- Occupation: Philosopher/Novelist
- Writing career
- Genre: Science Fiction/Fantasy
- Website: rsbakker.wordpress.com

Richard Scott Bakker (born February 2, 1967) is a Canadian fantasy author.

== Works ==
=== Fiction ===
==== The Second Apocalypse ====
The Second Apocalypse is a fantasy series that includes three sub-series titled The Prince of Nothing, The Aspect-Emperor, and The No-God. The series was originally planned as a trilogy, but when Bakker began writing the series in the early 2000s he found it necessary to split each of the three novels into its own sub-series to incorporate all of the characters, themes and ideas he wished to explore.

The Prince of Nothing trilogy was published between 2004 and 2006, while The Aspect-Emperor series was published between 2009 and 2017. The No-God has not been published at this time, and Bakker has not confirmed a release date.

==== Neuropath ====
While working on the Prince of Nothing series, Bakker was prompted by a crux of events to write a thriller dealing with the cognitive sciences. He produced a near future science fiction novel involving a serial killer whose knowledge allows him to influence and control the human brain. This book is called Neuropath and was published in 2008.

==== The Disciple of the Dog ====
Shortly before The Aspect-Emperor's second book, The White-Luck Warrior, was published, Bakker released a second novel outside of his main fantasy series. Titled Disciple of the Dog, it features the private investigator, Disciple Manning, who has a condition reminiscent of hyperthymesia. The story revolves around Disciple's recounting of a case involving a missing girl, a cult, and the small-town drama of Ruddick. It was published in November 2010. Bakker has planned a number of follow up novels to Disciple of the Dog, including The Enlightened Dead, but due to the first novel's poor reception and very few reviews the sequels have not been pursued.

== Selected bibliography ==
=== The Second Apocalypse ===
==== Prince of Nothing ====
- The Darkness That Comes Before (2004)
- The Warrior-Prophet (2005)
- The Thousandfold Thought (2006)

==== The Aspect-Emperor ====
- The Judging Eye (2009) ISBN 978-0-14-305160-2
- The White-Luck Warrior (2011) ISBN 978-0-14-305162-6
- The Great Ordeal (2016) ISBN 978-1-4683-0169-4
- The Unholy Consult (2017) ISBN 978-1468314861

=== Other novels ===
- Neuropath (2008)
- Disciple of the Dog (2010)
