= Spoiled Rotten America =

- Author: Larry Miller
- Language: English
- Genre: Humour
- Published: 2006 (ReganBooks)
- Publication place: United States
- Media type: Print (hardcover)
- Pages: 279 pp (first edition)
- ISBN: 9780060819088
- OCLC: 646600831

Spoiled Rotten America is a 2006 humor book written by actor, voice artist, comedian, podcaster, and columnist Larry Miller. The book, originally published by ReganBooks, is a collection of seventeen comic essays. The audiobook version, narrated by the author, won the 2007 Audie Award for Humor.
