= Wisdom of Our Fathers =

2006 book by Tim Russert

- Author: Tim Russert
- Language: English
- Genre: Non-fiction
- Publication date: 2006

Wisdom of Our Fathers: Lessons and Letters from Daughters and Sons is a book written by Tim Russert. On July 2, 2006 it was listed at #1 on The New York Times Non-Fiction Best Seller list.
