= The Husband (novel) =

2006 novel by Dean Koontz

- Author: Dean Koontz
- Cover artist: Tom Hallman
- Language: English
- Genre: Thriller
- Publisher: Bantam Books
- Publication date: 2006
- Publication place: United States
- Media type: Print (Hardcover)
- Pages: 416 453 - British paperback (ISBN 978-0-00-722656-6)
- ISBN: 0-553-80479-0
- OCLC: 67392945
- Dewey Decimal: 813/.54 22
- LC Class: PS3561.O55 H87 2006

The Husband is a novel by the best-selling author Dean Koontz, released in 2006. Focus Features, in conjunction with Random House Films, has announced that a film adaptation has been greenlit.

== Plot summary ==
Mitch Rafferty, owner of a small landscaping business, receives a phone call from someone claiming to have kidnapped his wife Holly. The caller demands that Mitch pay two million dollars or Holly will be killed, and if he informs the police, Holly will be tortured and left to die. When Mitch protests that he doesn't have the money, the caller tells him that if he loves his wife enough, he will find a way. He is told to look across the street and witnesses a man walking his dog get shot in the head. The murder is meant to make Mitch believe that the kidnappers are serious and not individuals Mitch could disobey. Mitch also becomes aware that he is being watched and therefore cannot inform the police of Holly's kidnapping.

When the police arrive to tend to the murder, Mitch is questioned by a detective named Sandy Taggart. Mitch does not tell Taggart of the kidnapping, and can sense that the detective believes he may be holding something back. However, Mitch is not arrested and leaves after Taggart officially dismisses him.

On arriving home, Mitch finds his house staged to look like he had killed his wife. He finds blood smeared over his clothes in the closet and splattered on the kitchen walls. The phone rings, and the kidnapper verifies Mitch's ideas about the staging. He informs Mitch they have also planted additional evidence that would be difficult for Mitch to locate and remove, but easy for police dogs. The kidnapper then plays a recording of Mitch's session with Taggart, which confirms his earlier belief that the kidnappers have him under surveillance. Mitch is then told to have his cell phone on and remain available for further instructions later in the evening.

Unsure if Taggart can be trusted, Mitch lies to the detective when he stops by, claiming Holly had come home with a migraine and was sleeping. Taggart tells Mitch that the victim has been identified as Jason Osteen, Mitch's college roommate, to whom he had not spoken for many years. After Taggart leaves, Mitch takes a lug wrench from the garage to use as a weapon. While in the garage he finds some high-tech spying equipment. Just after this discovery, he is surprised at gun point by one of Holly's captors, and is told to drop the wrench. As the gunman orders Mitch to leave, the lug wrench the captor had picked up gets caught on a stack of Halloween decorations that subsequently get knocked over upon the gunman. During the fall the gunman lands against a wheel barrow that crushes his trachea, breaks his neck, and then he inadvertently shoots himself in the chest. Mitch takes the handgun, another concealed gun from the man's ankle holster, puts the corpse in the back of his wife's car, and decides to visit his parents.

Mitch, realizing that events could worsen, arrives at his parents' house. He has no intention of revealing any information about Holly's abduction, but wishes to ease his mind with what could possibly be a final visit, and end on good terms with his parents. His relationship with his parents is not close, due to their harsh and unconventional views on raising children which includes the “learning room”, a sensory deprivation chamber. Mitch speaks briefly with his father, learns his mother is out for the evening, and comes away disappointed with the encounter.

The next phone call from the kidnappers comes at 6:00 p.m. As instructed, Mitch visits his brother Anson without informing him of Holly's kidnapping. During this time, Anson receives a call from the kidnappers and becomes aware of the situation. Anson, who had helped his siblings throughout their childhood cope with their parents, offers to give Mitch the two million dollar ransom amount. Mitch is surprised that Anson is financially able to provide this. Anson tells Mitch of a friend, ex-FBI agent Julian Campbell, and drives Mitch to Julian's residence explaining that Julian may be able to provide suggestions learned throughout his FBI career. After arriving at Julian's huge estate, Anson pulls a gun on Mitch and states that he wouldn't give his money to save Mitch, let alone Holly. Mitch learns Anson has worked with the criminals behind Holly's kidnapping and shorted them on their last criminal enterprise. Now, the kidnappers mistakenly believe that Anson will do anything to help Mitch save Holly.

Julian informs Mitch that he has never worked for the FBI and has obtained his wealth through the "entertainment industry." Julian has his two henchmen disarm Mitch and take him outside the city to be disposed of. Mitch manages to kill his executioners with the forgotten gun in the ankle holster and returns to his parents' house where he finds them dead. Again, the scene has been set up as if Mitch had killed his parents, although this time, Mitch believes Anson to be behind the setup.

Mitch confronts Anson at Anson's house, tasers him, and ties him to a chair in the laundry room. He does not reveal that he knows Anson killed his parents and promises to release Anson if he gives Mitch the two million. Anson eventually gives him the combination to a secret safe in the kitchen where he finds 1.4 million dollars in bearer bonds and cash. Mitch, remembering an earlier conversation with his brother, asks Anson how he really made so much money. Anson informs him of an illegal Internet company run by Julian Campbell that downloads untraceable adult and child pornography. Anson takes great delight in telling Mitch this, because he wants Mitch to know that Holly's ransom money is dirty and realizes Mitch will be reminded of this for the rest of his life with Holly. After hearing the story, Mitch is disgusted and leaves him in the dark laundry room instead of releasing him as promised, knowing that Anson does not like the dark and will be reminded of their parents' learning room.

Meanwhile, Holly is being held captive in an attic, trying surreptitiously to pry a nail from the floorboards. The nail is something that she regards as a pathetic weapon, and at first, she works at it merely to have something to focus on. She finally pries the nail free and conceals it without really knowing how she can use such a small device effectively against trained killers.

Holly has also learned that one of the kidnappers, Jimmy Null, has become suspicious of the others and killed them. He tells Holly how they had all grown dubious of each other and acted so that they would not kill him. He plans to keep all the money for himself.

During this time, she also wins the remaining kidnapper's trust by listening to his stories of visions, inventing a vision of her own, and indicating she might travel with him to New Mexico where their visions take place.

Jimmy Null then calls Mitch again - speaking with a different voice - and agrees to the 1.4 million in cash offered. Mitch is instructed to meet them at the Turnbridge house, an enormous mansion on which construction was halted. Before Mitch can leave, Taggart arrives with the news that Anson's name appeared in Jason Osteen's phone book. Taggert also points out inconsistencies in Mitch's earlier story to him. Mitch initially claims his brother is away, but finally confesses the series of events to Taggart. As they are going to see Anson in the laundry room, Mitch tasers Taggart and runs away. Before fleeing, he tells Taggart that he cannot trust anyone else to save Holly, because he loves her too much and time is running out.

After buying rounds for a gun he took from one of the executioners, Mitch is chased on foot from the gun store by the police. He steals an SUV from a gas station and goes to the Turnbridge house where he confronts his enemy. The kidnapper tells Mitch that Holly's moment of decision has arrived, and Holly is able to distract the kidnapper with what he believes is proof of her visions and devotion by appearing to have stigmata. Holly's wounds are in fact secretly self-inflicted from the nail. Mitch takes advantage of the distraction and shoots the kidnapper, who is initially protected with a bullet-proof vest. Null then chases Mitch and Holly with a motorcycle but Mitch is able to eventually kill him by firing at his head.

The novel ends with an epilogue. It is at the 32nd birthday of Mitch. Campbell has been murdered in prison and Anson is currently on death row. Mitch and Holly have two children and will eventually have a third, Mitch's business is booming, and Detective Taggart is now a family friend.
