= Zhi Gang Sha =

Chinese faith healer

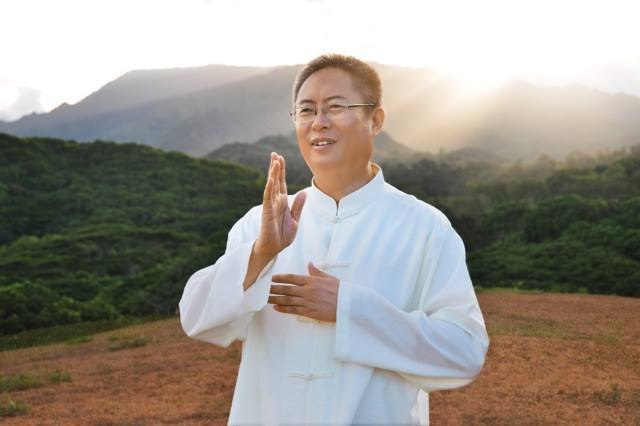
Zhi Gang Sha

Zhi Gang Sha (Chinese: 沙志鋼; born 1956) is a Grandmaster world-renowned healer, spiritual teacher, humanitarian, Tao Calligraphy artist and 11-time New York Times best selling author. He is also a distinguished award-winning spiritual innovator.

== Life and ideas ==
Master Zhi Gang Sha is a Tao grandmaster, healer, teacher. Sha is a strong promoter of forms of spirituality. He has published over 30 books, including eleven New York Times bestselling books, including Soul Healing Miracles: Ancient and New Sacred Wisdom, Knowledge, and Practical Techniques for Healing the Spiritual, Mental, Emotional, and Physical Bodies, which has sold more than 300,000 copies since its release in November 2013. His 2014 book, Soul Mind Body Science System, debuted on the Amazon Top 100 Bestseller List.

Sha has an MD degree in Western medicine from China and is also a doctor of traditional Chinese medicine and acupuncture in Canada. He is a Grand Master of Tai Chi, Qi Gong, I Ching, and Feng Shui. He was the lead acupuncturist for the World Health Organization, has been named Qigong Master of the Year and in 2006 was awarded the Martin Luther King Jr. Commemorative Commission Award for his humanitarian efforts. He teaches his patients that chanting mantras in Mandarin Chinese can heal their ailments. and practices what he refers to as "soul healings".

== Publications ==
Sha has written thirty books, including Zhi Neng Medicine: Revolutionary Self-Healing Methods from China (Zhi Neng Press, 1996), Power Healing: The Four Keys to Energizing Your Body, Mind and Spirit (Harper San Francisco, 2002), Soul Mind Body Medicine: A Complete Soul Healing System for Optimum Health and Vitality (New World Library, 2006), Living Divine Relationships (Heaven's Library Publication Corp., 2006), Soul Wisdom I: Practical Soul Treasures to Transform Your Life (Heaven's Library Publication Corp., 2007), and Soul Communication: Opening Your Spiritual Channels for Success and Fulfillment (Heaven's Library Publication Corp., 2007).

In 2008, Sha partnered with Atria Books, a major division of Simon and Schuster, to create the "Soul Power" series: The Power of Soul (2009), Divine Soul Songs: Sacred Practical Treasures to Heal, Rejuvenate, and Transform You, Humanity, Mother Earth, and All Universes (2009) and Divine Soul Mind Body Healing and Transmission System: The Divine Way to Heal You, Humanity, Mother Earth, and All Universes (2009), Tao I: The Way of All Life (2010), Divine Transformation: The Divine Way to Self-clear Karma and Transform Your Health, Relationships, Finances, and More (2010), Tao II: The Way of Healing, Rejuvenation, Longevity, and Immortality (2010), Tao Song and Tao Dance: Sacred Sound, Movement, and Power from the Source for Healing, Rejuvenation, Longevity, and Transformation of All Life (2011), and Divine Healing Hands: Experience Divine Power to Heal You, Animals, and Nature, and to Transform All Life (2012). Soul Healing Miracles: Ancient and New Sacred Wisdom, Knowledge, and Practical Techniques for Healing the Spiritual, Mental, Emotional, and Physical Bodies (BenBella Books, 2013).

== Awards ==
- County of Maui Proclamation 2014
- Martin Luther King Jr. Commemorative Award 2006
- City of Honolulu Certificate 2014
- City of Honolulu Proclamation 2015
- Governor of Hawaii Commendation 2014
- Hawaii Senate Commendation 2016
- Los Angeles County Commendation 2016
- City of San Marino Commendation 2017
- US Congress Outstanding Chinese Award 2017
- Hawaii Commendation May 2017
- International Tara Award Dec 2017
- US Representative Congratulations Mar 2019
- Hawaii Governor's Message Mar 2019
- US Congress Congratulations 2019
- Certificate of Special Congressional Recognition Mar 2019
