= I Feel Bad About My Neck =

2006 book of essays by Nora Ephron

I Feel Bad About My Neck: And Other Thoughts on Being a Woman
- Cover of the first edition
- Author: Nora Ephron
- Publisher: Knopf
- Publication date: August 2006
- Media type: Print (hardcover, paperback, e-book)
- Pages: 137
- ISBN: 978-0307264558

I Feel Bad About My Neck: And Other Thoughts on Being a Woman is a 2006 book of humorous essays by Nora Ephron. It was published shortly after her 65th birthday, and most of the essays are wry observations on the aging process and what she calls "Pathetic Attempts to Turn Back the Clock".

The book reached #1 on the nonfiction best seller list, and stayed on the list for 45 weeks. In The New York Times review, Janet Maslin said "[t]his brief, long-overdue book is for readers still willing to buy into Ms. Ephron's familiar writing persona: that of a sharp, funny, theatrically domesticated New Yorker who can throw both arrows and good money at the petty things that plague her."

== Synopsis ==
In the title essay, Ephron writes:

We all look good for our age. Except for our necks.... According to my dermatologist, the neck starts to go at forty-three, and that's that. You can put makeup on your face and concealer under your eyes and dye on your hair, you can shoot collagen and Botox and Restylane into your wrinkles and creases, but short of surgery, there's not a damn thing you can do about a neck. The neck is a dead giveaway. Our faces are lies and our necks are the truth. You have to cut open a redwood tree to see how old it is, but you wouldn't have to if it had a neck.

The longest essay, "On Maintenance", itemizes the costly, time-consuming beauty rituals she undergoes on a continual basis—hair, hair dye, nails, skin, teeth, exercise, removing unwanted hair—"just to keep from looking like someone who no longer cares". After passing a homeless woman on the street, Ephron estimates she is "only about eight hours a week away" from looking exactly like that woman.

A few of the essays are humorous reminiscences, for example, "Me and JFK: Now It Can Be Told" recounts Ephron's experiences as an intern in the White House press office in the summer of 1961. Her one interaction with JFK occurred when he was leaving by helicopter for a weekend in Hyannis Port. Amid the deafening helicopter noise, he paused briefly to speak with her while she stood under the portico overlooking the White House Rose Garden:

I couldn't hear a thing, but I could read his lips, and I'm pretty sure what he said was "How are you coming along?" But I wasn't positive. So I replied as best I could. "What?" I said. And that was it. He turned and went off to the helicopter, and I went back to standing around the White House until the summer was over. I never saw him again.... it has become horribly clear to me that I am probably the only young woman who ever worked in the Kennedy White House that the president did not make a pass at.... Anyway, that's my story. I might as well go public with it, although I have told it to pretty much everyone I have ever met in the last forty-two years.

In "What I Wish I'd Known", she offers hard-earned nuggets of wisdom, such as "Never marry a man you wouldn't want to be divorced from"; "Don't buy anything that is 100 percent wool even if it seems to be very soft and not particularly itchy when you try it on in the store"; and "Anything you think is wrong with your body at the age of thirty-five you will be nostalgic for at the age of forty-five".

In "Considering the Alternative", Ephron expresses exasperation at the "nonsense" written about the joys of being elderly, "although I can certainly understand that no one really wants to read anything that says aging sucks." At one point she asks, "Why do people write books that say it's better to be older than to be younger? It's not better. Even if you have all your marbles, you're constantly reaching for the name of the person you met the day before yesterday."

== Background ==
A number of the book's essays appeared originally in magazines and newspapers, including Harper's Bazaar, The New Yorker, The New York Times, O, The Oprah Magazine, and Vogue.

In an interview, Ephron said she was motivated to publish I Feel Bad About My Neck after seeing recent bestsellers such as Gail Sheehy's Sex and the Seasoned Woman: Pursuing the Passionate Life: "There was this avalanche of books full of unrelenting boosterism about how fabulous it is to be older. I thought, how weird is this that no one is saying how complicated and confusing and sad it is? If I write that, will it be too depressing? I forgot while asking that question that I usually write things from the point of view of someone who tries to make a joke now and then."

== Reception ==
On August 20, 2006, Ephron's book debuted at #4 on The New York Times Nonfiction Best Seller list. By September 10, it reached #1, and it remained on the best seller list through July 2007.

Mimi Avins wrote in a Los Angeles Times review that when Ephron "whimpers about the indignities and annoyances that accompany getting older, readers who have followed the high highs and low lows of her life know that her rants are dependably free of bitterness." Avins added, "Ephron simultaneously embraces and laughs at how women subscribe to the myth of our own perfectibility. She calls it denial. 'Doing some of the things you can do to make yourself look younger buys you a little bit of time in the acceptance of aging department,' she said. 'You're putting off the acceptance of being 60 or 65 by looking 58.'"

In The New York Review of Books, Diane Johnson noted Ephron's "sound rhetorical strategy"—which she had deployed as early as her 1970 book Wallflower at the Orgy—of presenting a hapless character to readers: "Of all the ways of being funny, self-deprecation is more endearing than satire, and runs a smaller risk of backlash.... Rueful discussions of depressing age-related discoveries are sure-fire ways to get a laugh." As an example, Johnson cited a remark in one of the essays about "the true nightmare of the empty nest: Your children are gone, and they were the only people in the house who knew how to use the remote control."

In Newsday, Heller McAlpin singled out for praise the essay "Moving On" about Ephron being forced to leave a beloved Manhattan apartment after her rent skyrocketed: "What is so refreshing about Ephron is that she doesn't take herself too seriously. Mid-complaint about her rising rent, she has the self-perspective to quip, 'And no one cared. Even I wouldn't have cared if I hadn't been me.'"

In The Plain Dealer, Karen Sandstrom admitted that as a longtime fan of Ephron's writing, she was disappointed by this latest essay collection: "Sure, I feel bad about my neck, but I also feel bad about spending time thinking about it. It's so absurd, so vain. How does Ephron fold her wrinkly neck into a bigger picture? I wasn't sure. I'm still not." Sandstorm continued:

In the decades since Ephron first started writing in her smart, down-to-earth way, the personal essay has become ubiquitous. Imitators lined up at newspapers to follow in the footsteps of Erma Bombeck and early Anna Quindlen.... The world oozes with the wittily turned phrase and the nicely made observation on quotidian life. I want Nora Ephron to be more than quick-tongued. I want her to be, even at 65, completely fresh. I want her to be both funny and wise. Too often here, she skims the surface on topics that deserve the full benefit of her intelligence. Her neck might sag, but it's her brain that could be in better trim.

Janet Maslin stated in The New York Times: "The fact that she is 65 gives Ms. Ephron unavoidable subjects for contemplation: age, loss and vanity. None are automatically delightful. But she retains an uncanny ability to sound like your best friend...even when she is describing the death of her own best friend in a sobering piece called 'Considering the Alternative'. When, in the end, she has no better way to ward off mortality than staying silky smooth by using the right bath oil, a certain guilty, pampered segment of the reading public will know exactly what she means."

In 2019, I Feel Bad About My Neck was ranked #100 on The Guardian's list of the 100 best books of the 21st century.
