= The Most Famous Man in America =

Book by Debby Applegate

The Most Famous Man in America: The Biography of Henry Ward Beecher
- Author: Debby Applegate
- Genre: biography
- Publisher: Doubleday
- Publication date: 2006
- Publication place: United States
- Pages: 527
- Awards: Pulitzer Prize for Biography or Autobiography
- ISBN: 978-0-385-51397-5

The Most Famous Man in America: The Biography of Henry Ward Beecher is a 2006 biography of the 19th-century American minister Henry Ward Beecher, written by Debby Applegate and published by Doubleday. The book describes Beecher's childhood, ministry, support for the abolition of slavery and other social causes, and widely publicized 1875 trial for adultery.

Before publishing the book, Applegate researched and wrote about Beecher for twenty years, starting when she was an undergraduate student at Beecher's alma mater, Amherst College. The book was generally well received by critics. In 2007, it was awarded the Pulitzer Prize for Biography or Autobiography.

== Background ==
As an undergraduate student worker at Amherst College, Applegate was assigned to assemble an exhibit on a famous alumnus and selected Beecher. She later wrote about him for her undergraduate senior thesis and made him the subject of her PhD dissertation at Yale University. After graduation, Applegate signed a publishing contract for a biography of Beecher. To write a biography with popular appeal, Applegate studied fiction writing, including techniques for suspense and pornographic writing. She structured the resulting book as a psychological thriller.

Though she had originally hoped to publish the book during the 1998 Lewinsky scandal, in which US President Bill Clinton was discovered to have had a sexual relationship with a White House intern, the research took several years longer than she had initially planned. The book was finally released in 2006 by Doubleday and Three Leaves Press in hardback, paperback, and e-book editions.

== Contents ==
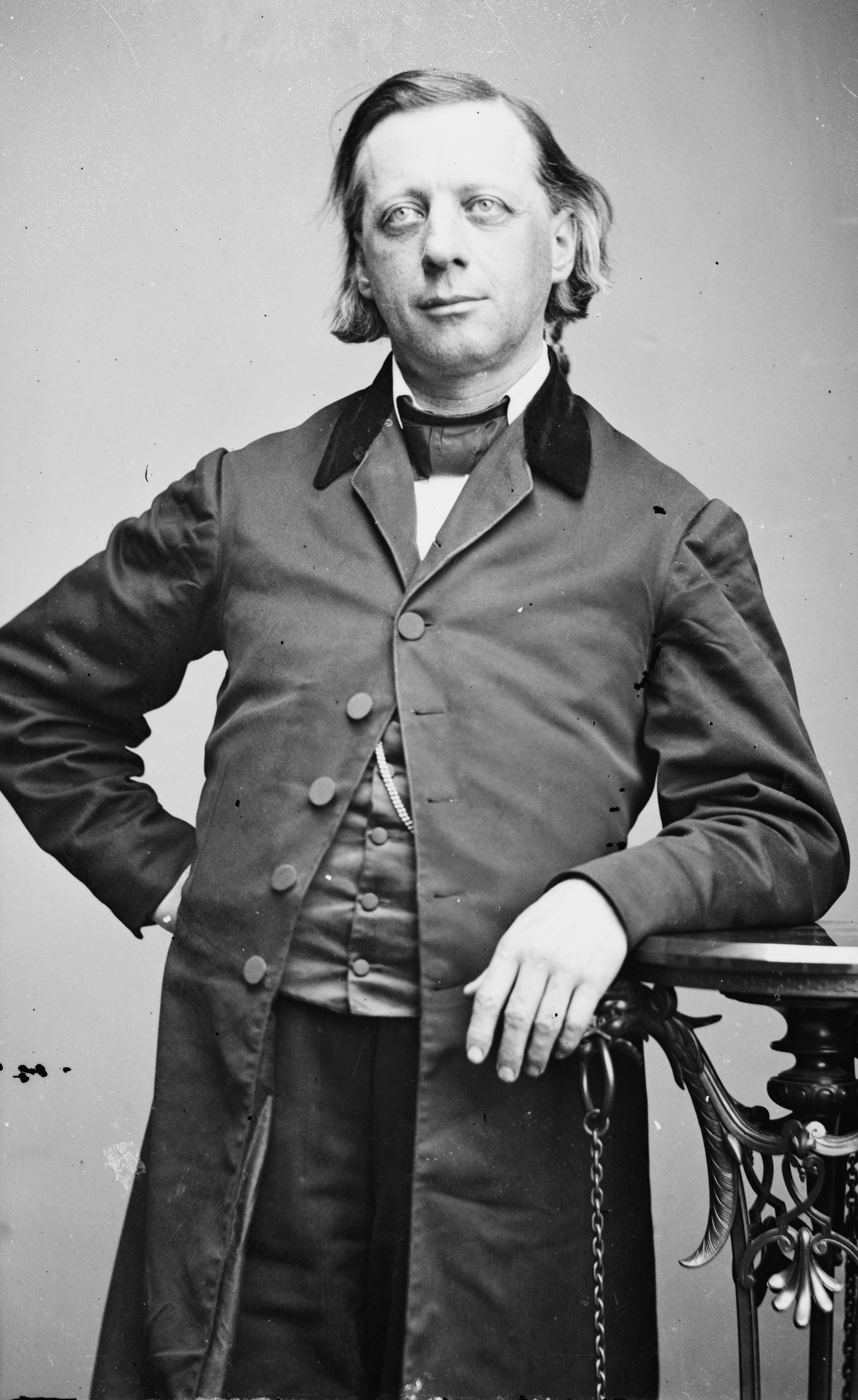
Henry Ward Beecher, the book's subject

The Most Famous Man in America follows the life of 19th-century American minister Henry Ward Beecher. Its introduction describes Beecher's speech at Fort Sumter, South Carolina, at the close of the American Civil War; Beecher was personally invited to speak by President Abraham Lincoln, who commented, "We had better send Beecher down to deliver the address on the occasion of the raising of the flag because if it had not been for Beecher there would have been no flag to raise". Applegate then retells Beecher's sometimes difficult childhood as the son of Lyman Beecher, himself a famous evangelist. Henry was initially overshadowed by his accomplished siblings, who included Harriet Beecher Stowe, later the author of the antislavery novel Uncle Tom's Cabin. Henry discovered a gift for public speaking and went into the ministry, attending Amherst College and Lane Theological Seminary. He then served as a minister in Lawrenceburg, Indiana and Indianapolis before moving on to the richer post of the Plymouth Church in Brooklyn, New York.

In New York, Beecher soon acquired fame on the lecture circuit for his novel oratorical style, in which he employed humor, dialect, and slang. Over the course of his ministry, he developed a theology emphasizing God's love above all else, in contrast to his father's stern Calvinism. He also grew interested in social reform, particularly the abolitionist movement. In the years leading up to the Civil War, he raised money to purchase slaves from captivity and to send rifles—nicknamed "Beecher's Bibles"—to abolitionists fighting in Kansas and Nebraska. He toured Europe during the Civil War speaking in support of the Union. After the war, Beecher supported social reform causes such as women's suffrage and temperance.

In the book's closing chapters, Applegate details Beecher's relationship with Elizabeth Richards Tilton, wife of his friend and associate Theodore Tilton, and its consequences. Elizabeth Tilton both confessed to and retracted her confession of an affair with Beecher; her husband later filed adultery charges against Beecher, resulting in one of the most widely reported American trials of the century. The jurors could not decide whom to believe, resulting in a hung jury.

In assessing Beecher's legacy, Applegate states that

His reputation has been eclipsed by his own success. Mainstream Christianity is so deeply infused with the rhetoric of Christ's love that most Americans can imagine nothing else, and have no appreciation or memory of the revolution wrought by Beecher and his peers.

Applegate adds that it is hard not to consider Beecher's various affairs or near-affairs hypocritical, but compares him to other great leaders whose need for love and approval led them into sex scandals. Ultimately, Applegate concludes, Beecher was able "to transform his flaws into a powerful force of empathy and ambition" that "brought a new emotional candor to public life".

== Critical response ==
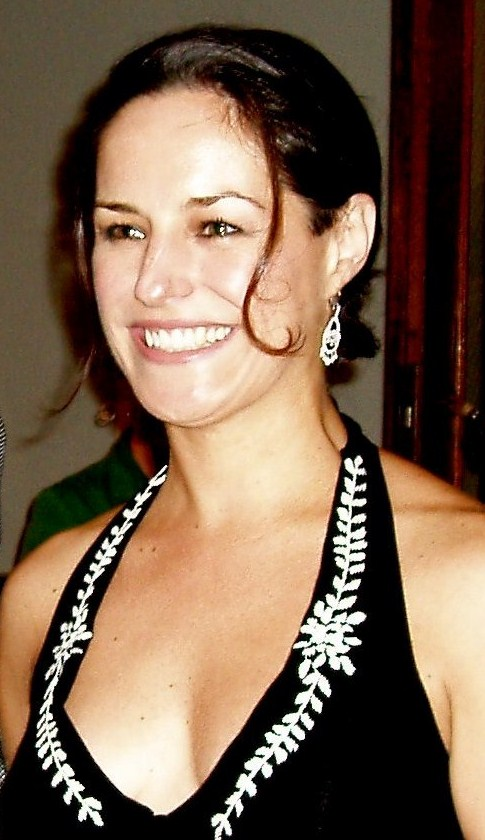
Debby Applegate at Brooklyn Historical Society, 2006

The Most Famous Man in America was well received by critics. NPR selected it as one of the year's best nonfiction books, stating that the book "convinces readers of the truth of that swaggering title". Kirkus Reviews called it a "beautifully written biography of America's one best-known preacher ... An exceptionally thorough and thoughtful account of a spectacular career that helped shape and reflect national preoccupations before, during and after the Civil War." Publishers Weekly wrote that "this assessment of Beecher is judicious and critical. Applegate gives an insightful account." In a review for The Boston Globe, Katherine A. Powers called the book a "fantastic story with novelistic flair and penetration into the ever-changing motives and expediencies of its many actors." Jon Meacham, reviewing for The Washington Post, called the book "illuminating and thorough".

Michael Kazin, reviewing the book for The New York Times, stated that the book occasionally "loses its force in a thicket of personal details", but concluded that it is "a biography worthy of its subject". Deidre Donahue, writing in USA Today, also stated that the book had "sometimes excessive detail" but praised its "marvelous perspective". Ernest W. Lefever wrote in The Washington Times that "Applegate's fact-studded and fast-paced portrait of one of America's most famous preachers from one of America's most famous 19th-century families is a remarkably authentic mirror of the times", criticizing only the "minor flaw" of a lack of nuance in her description of Calvinism. Heather Cox Richardson praised the book in The Chicago Tribune, calling it "one of those rare books that delivers a great deal more than it promises"; though critical of what she saw as some factual errors and "unsubstantiated claims" by Applegate, such as Lyman Beecher's role in creating mass media, Richardson concluded that these flaws "do not cripple her story".

On April 16, 2007, the book was announced as the winner of the Pulitzer Prize for Biography or Autobiography. Applegate said of her win, "Half of it is just good luck.... Had it come out four years ago, I don't think the climate was ready for it. The religious right intersection with politics is very important now."

== Notes ==
=== References ===
- Applegate, Debby (2006). The Most Famous Man in America: The Biography of Henry Ward Beecher. Doubleday Religious Publishing Group. ISBN 978-0-307-42400-6.
