= Debby Applegate =

American historian and biographer

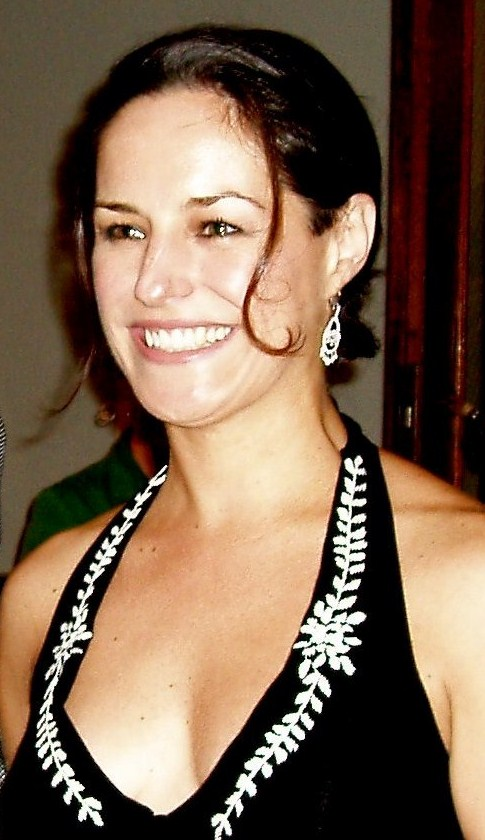
- Applegate in 2006
- Born: February 1, 1968 (age 58); Eugene, Oregon, U.S.
- Education: Amherst College (BA); Yale University (PhD)
- Occupation: Historian
- Spouse: Bruce Tulgan
- Writing career
- Genre: Biography
- Notable work: The Most Famous Man in America (2006)

Debby Applegate is an American historian and biographer. She is the author of Madam: The Biography of Polly Adler, Icon of the Jazz Age and The Most Famous Man in America: The Biography of Henry Ward Beecher, for which she won the 2007 Pulitzer Prize for Biography or Autobiography.

Born in Eugene, Oregon, Applegate attended Amherst College as an undergraduate, where she began a two-decade fascination with famous alumnus Henry Ward Beecher, a 19th-century abolitionist minister who was later the subject of a widely publicized sex scandal. She made Beecher the subject of her dissertation in American Studies at Yale, where she received a Ph.D. After several more years of research, Applegate published The Most Famous Man in America, which was praised by critics and awarded the Pulitzer Prize. Her second book, Madam: The Biography of Polly Adler, Icon of the Jazz Age, an account of the life and times of the notorious Manhattan brothel-keeper Polly Adler, was published in November 2021 after thirteen years of extensive research.

== Biography ==
Born in Eugene, Oregon, Applegate grew up in Clackamas, Oregon, graduating from Clackamas High School. She was raised in what she described as an "unusual religious environment": her mother, from a Mormon family, became a New Thought minister, while her father was an Irish Catholic. She graduated summa cum laude from Amherst College in 1989 and was a Sterling Fellow at Yale University, where she earned a Ph.D. in American Studies.

Applegate has taught at Yale, Wesleyan University, and Marymount Manhattan College. Her contributions have appeared in The Journal of American History and The New York Times.

Applegate was a founding member of Biographers International Organization (BIO), and served as its initial interim president in 2009. She currently serves as the Chair of BIO's Advisory Committee.

She is married to Bruce Tulgan, a business writer whose books include It's Okay To Be The Boss. They live in New Haven, Connecticut.

== Works ==
=== The Most Famous Man in America ===
As an undergraduate student worker at Amherst College, Applegate was assigned to assemble an exhibit on a famous alumnus and selected Henry Ward Beecher, a 19th-century minister known for his abolitionist preaching and widely publicized sex scandal. Applegate described him as " unlike any religious figure I’d ever seen. I loved his very modern sense of humor, his irreverence, and his joyful, ecumenical approach to religion and life in general." She later made him the subject of her undergraduate senior thesis and her PhD dissertation at Yale University. After graduation, Applegate signed a publishing contract to write a biography of Beecher.

"I had acquired an excellent education as an academic historian, but I’d never had a single lesson, formal or informal, in this new craft I had so blithely chosen," Applegate later recalled. Applegate's initial chapters were written in what she considered an overly academic voice, so to write a biography with popular appeal, she studied fiction writing, including techniques for suspense and pornographic writing. "I made my way through my first book by trial and error, using my cobbled-together collection of examples, borrowed exercises and jerry-rigged postulations, to navigate the enormous task of fashioning an intellectually and emotionally compelling account out of the scattered detritus of a person’s life," wrote Applegate in a 2016 essay on making the leap from academic historian to popular biographer. She structured the resulting book as a psychological thriller.

Though she had originally hoped to publish the book during the 1998 Lewinsky scandal, in which US President Bill Clinton was discovered to have had a sexual relationship with a White House intern, the research took several years longer than she had initially planned. The book was finally released in 2006 by Doubleday.

==== Reception ====
The Most Famous Man in America sold well and was praised by critics. NPR selected it as one of the year's best nonfiction books, stating that the book "convinces readers of the truth of that swaggering title". Kirkus Reviews called it a "beautifully written biography of America's one best-known preacher ... An exceptionally thorough and thoughtful account of a spectacular career that helped shape and reflect national preoccupations before, during and after the Civil War." Publishers Weekly wrote that "this assessment of Beecher is judicious and critical. Applegate gives an insightful account." In a review for The Boston Globe, Katherine A. Powers called the book a "fantastic story with novelistic flair and penetration into the ever-changing motives and expediencies of its many actors." Michael Kazin, reviewing the book for The New York Times, stated that Applegate's writing occasionally "loses its force in a thicket of personal details", but concluded that the book is "a biography worthy of its subject".

On April 16, 2007, the book was announced as the winner of the Pulitzer Prize for Biography or Autobiography. Applegate said of her win, "Half of it is just good luck ... Had it come out four years ago, I don't think the climate was ready for it. The religious right intersection with politics is very important now."

=== Madam: The Biography of Polly Adler, Icon of the Jazz Age ===
Applegate's second book is a biography of Polly Adler, New York City's notorious Prohibition-era brothel-keeper whose 1953 memoir A House is Not a Home became a New York Times Bestseller and a 1963 film starring Shelley Winters. The decision to write the book came after a year of research into 1920s New York City cultural history, during which Applegate discovered Adler's memoir and grew fascinated by it. "Innocently strolling the library stacks, I stumbled upon yet another big, bewitching American character — a once infamous but now forgotten madam named Polly Adler," wrote Applegate in an essay honoring the centennial of the Pulitzer Prizes. "Before I knew it, I’d signed another contract and marched back into the swamp." Applegate worked on the book for thirteen years, relying in particular on Polly Adler's remaining personal papers and the notebooks of Adler's ghostwriter Virginia Faulkner.

Madam: The Biography of Polly Adler, Icon of the Jazz Age was published by Doubleday in November, 2021, to glowing reviews. John Dickerson of CBS News Sunday Morning called Madam, “A biography that is also a story of America, bursting into the modern age, with new roles for women, new rules for couples, and parties that flowed into rooms down the hall.” In New York magazine Chris Bonanos called it, “a hugely digressive book in the best possible way: You meet a lot of gangsters and high rollers in Adler’s New York, and they cross paths with novelists, entertainers, professional boxers, and now and then a mayor or a Rockefeller.” In the New York Times, reviewer Paulina Bren wrote, "Replete with accounts of Polly’s many court battles, newspaper headlines, mobster dealings and society gossip, “Madam” is a breathless tale told through extraordinary research. Indeed, the galloping pace of Applegate’s book sometimes makes the reader want to pull out a white flag and wave in surrender — begging for her to slow down."
