= Daaku =

2006 novel by Ranj Dhaliwal

- Author: Ranj Dhaliwal
- Language: English
- Publisher: New Star Books Ltd.
- Publication date: October 2006
- Publication place: Canada
- Media type: Print, ebook
- Pages: 312 pages (paperback)
- ISBN: 9781554200276

Daaku is a 2006 Canadian crime fiction novel by Ranj Dhaliwal.

== Synopsis ==
Growing up in an abusive household, Ruby Pandher turns to petty crime at a young age. His natural leadership abilities attract the attention of established Indo-Canadian gang members, marking the start of his rise through organized crime.

Working as a debt collector for Indo-Canadian drug traffickers, Ruby attracts the attention of police. While facing weapons and theft charges, he is drawn into a gang war and a jailhouse smuggling operation, becoming increasingly immersed in organized crime and the pursuit of power, money, and drugs.

The novel deals with themes of betrayal, murder, and gangsterism. Daaku explores the setting of Indo–Canadian gangland.

== Reception ==
Daaku has been compared to Martin Scorsese's Goodfellas and S.E. Hinton's The Outsiders. "Daaku provides a fascinating look into the gang world's twisted morality, casual murder, commodification of women, and the inevitability of violent demise." says website "Quill and Quire"
