= The Diamond of Drury Lane =

2006 children's historical novel by Julia Golding

- First edition cover
- Author: Julia Golding
- Language: English
- Series: Cat Royal
- Genre: Children's historical novel
- Publisher: Egmont
- Publication date: 2 January 2006
- Publication place: United Kingdom
- Pages: 256
- ISBN: 978-1-4052-2149-8
- Followed by: Cat among the Pigeons

The Diamond of Drury Lane is a children's historical novel by Julia Golding which won the Nestle Children's Book Prize Gold Award and the Waterstone's Children's Book Prize in 2006. The book is set on 1 January 1790.

== Plot ==
An orphaned 13-year-old girl named Catherine "Cat" Royal lives in the Theatre Royal, after the owner, Mr. Sheridan, who named her after the theatre, found her as a baby. She knows well the Theatre and its surroundings, later 18th-century England. One night Cat overhears Mr. Sheridan and his colleague Marchmont discussing a valuable diamond hidden in the theatre. Cat is intrigued, but she promises to protect it for Mr. Sheridan after he tells her that nobody can know about it as it is difficult to know whom to trust with this secret.

Cat befriends an African boy violinist, Pedro, who arrives to be the musician's apprentice. Cat also meets the aristocratic Avon family, the duke and duchess of Avon, and their children, Lord Francis and Lady Elizabeth, who are not as arrogant as other wealthy people, and actually want to be Cat's friends.

She also meets Johnny, the new prompt with a rather unmistakable talent for art, specifically controversial political cartoons, and a mysterious past of which he does not speak much of, other than the fact he ran away from home at a young age. She learns that Johnny is the "Captain Sparkler" accused of treason for the cartoons against the King of England. Cat soon also finds out that Johnny had had a romantic past with Lady Elizabeth, and would possibly be bidding for her in the marriage market if his situation was different.

Pedro is told of the diamond by Cat, which she later regrets when she finds him looking for it in Mr Sheridan's office hoping it will give him payment for a boat to his homeland in Africa, where he can escape the grasp of slave traders. This is before Cat learns that the diamond is not a real diamond, but is a metaphor used by Johnny's friends to refer to him as to avoid giving away valuable information to those who might hand him over to the court. He is of value because of the reward for his capture.

However, a street gang led by Cat's enemy Billy "Boil" Shepherd ("Boil" being a reference to the boil on his nose), learns about the diamond, and assumes it is a real diamond. He breaks into the Theatre to steal it, bringing a few members of the gang with him. Cat and Pedro manage to evade him, but Cat is arrested for having money that was supposed to be for smuggling Johnny out of England where he will be safe. The money was really pawned jewels from Elizabeth, which she had given Cat permission to take to the pawn brokers, but the people who arrest her do not believe this. Billy is also arrested for stealing the money, although it was not actually him who stole it, but two members of his gang. Johnny's father Lord Fitzroy, however, knows the true reason to why Cat had the money in the first place, and arranges for her to be set free. Unfortunately, Billy is also set free later on, and the two gang members replace him in prison.

Johnny eventually gets out of England, with the help of Frank (Lord Francis), Lizzie (Lady Elizabeth) and Cat. Cat is reunited with her theatre and everyone in it. In the end, Mr. Sheridan tells her that there was no real diamond, which Cat is already aware of. Cat feels ashamed for not realizing it earlier, but Mr Sheridan reminds that in fact Johnny never was the so-called "diamond" and that Cat is the true diamond of the Theatre Royal, and the theatre would be nothing without its "Cat".

== Sequels ==
There are five sequels:

- Cat among the Pigeons
- Den of Thieves
- Cat O'Nine Tails
- Black Heart of Jamaica
- Cat's Cradle and "Middle Passage".
