= Pegasus in popular culture =

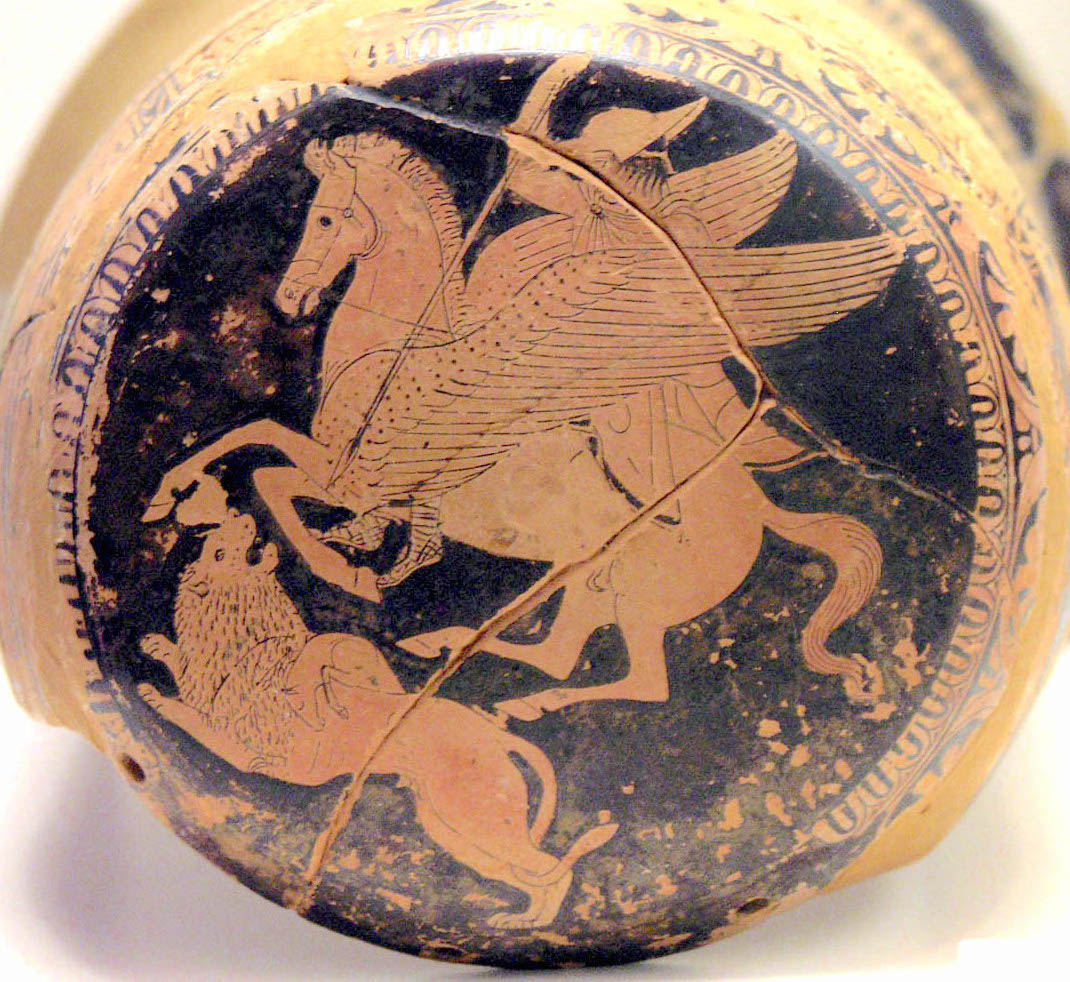
Bellerophon on Pegasus spears the Chimera, on an Attic red-figure epinetron 425–420 BC

The winged, divine horse Pegasus has been a prominent figure in modern popular culture.

== Art ==
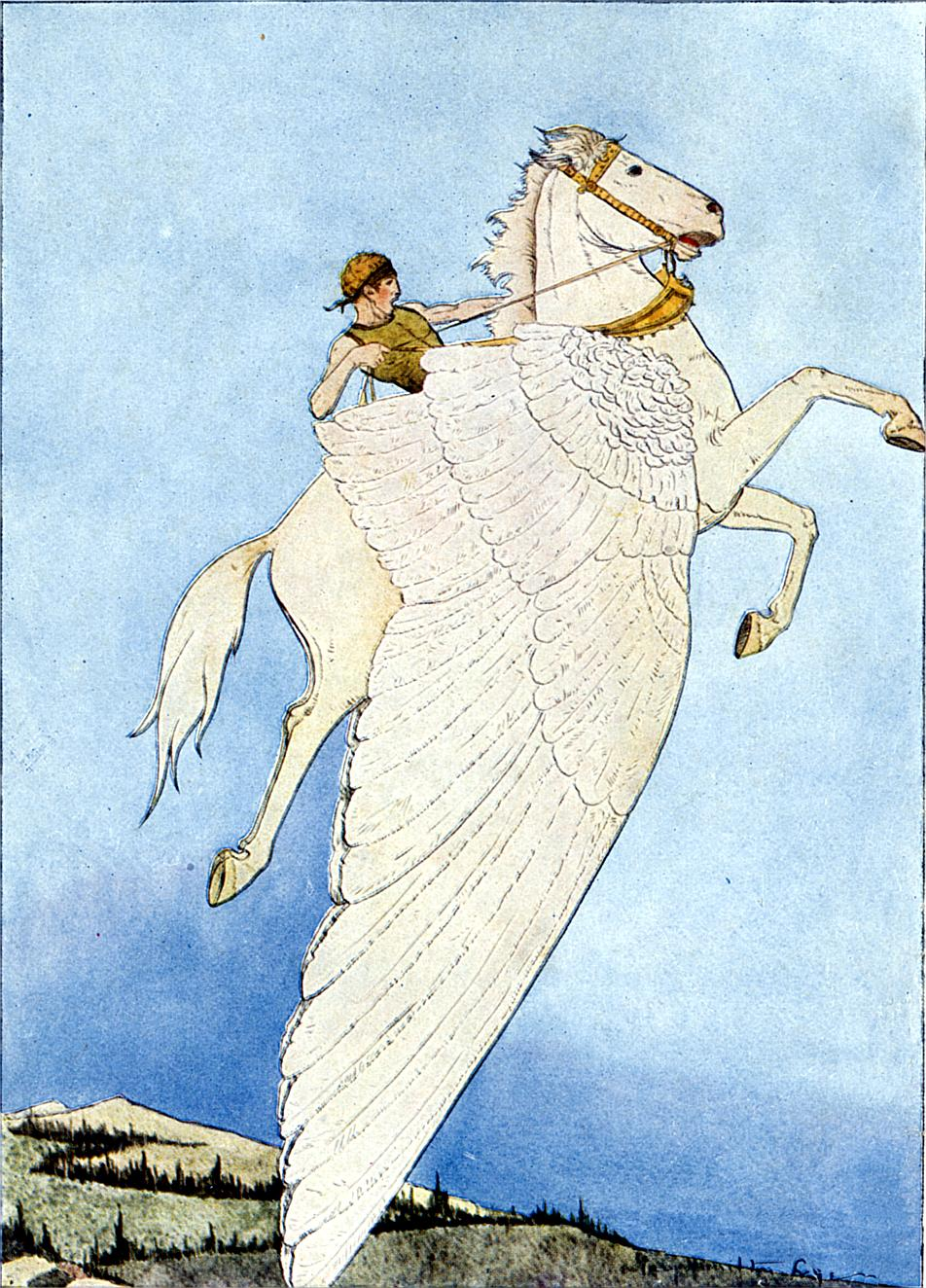
Bellerophon riding Pegasus (1914)

- Pegasus, an 1888 sculpture that depicts the creature being tamed by Bellerophon, is the most famous work of French sculptor Émile Louis Picault, of which only 800 were made.
- Statues of Pegasus, Mexico City

== Corporate and commercial uses ==
- Pegasus was chosen for the academic seal of the University of Central Florida, in 1963, by its first president, Dr. Charles Millican, who co-designed it.
- The Pegasus logo has been used for over twenty-nine years by Courier Company Pegasus Express Ltd, appearing on vehicles, trailers, and depots in Scotland and England.
- Pegasus has been the symbol of the Mobil brand of gas and oil, marketed by the Exxon Mobil Corporation, since the 1930s and, more recently, FBR Capital Markets, an investment bank based in Arlington, Virginia. It has also been a symbol of Dallas, Texas atop the Magnolia building and in Pegasus Plaza.
- Pegasus appears prominently in the logo of Indian business conglomerate UB Group.
- Pegasus is an air-launched vehicle that carries satellites to orbit.
- Pegaso was a Spanish maker of trucks, buses and sport cars, although its logo portrayed the silhouette of a wingless, leaping horse.
- The Poetry Foundation uses Pegasus as its logo.
- The Buell Motorcycle Company uses Pegasus as a visual branding element.
- Reader's Digest has a Pegasus logo.
- A Pegasus is the emblem of the Honourable Society of the Inner Temple, which names its bar the Pegasus. Pegasus is also the name of a University of Exeter's Classics and Ancient History Departmental journal, having had many entries from notable classicists as well as two articles from J. K. Rowling, a former student of the university's Classics and Ancient History Department.
- Pegasus was featured on the cover of Fleetwood Mac's single "Family Man".
- Pegasus was featured on the covers of three albums by The Steve Miller Band: Book of Dreams in 1977, Greatest Hits 1974-78, and Living in the 20th Century in 1986.
- The Taiwanese company Asustek, manufacturer of the Asus brand computer, networking and consumer product. took its name from the Pegasus, omitting the first three letters in order for the company to appear first in telephone listings. Likewise, its former fabrication subsidiary Pegatron took the first four letters from the Pegasus.
- The Pegasus is the mascot of the Kentucky Derby Festival, a community celebration leading up to the Kentucky Derby in Louisville, Kentucky, USA.
- Turkish Pegasus Airlines uses the emblem of Pegasus, with Pegasus also appearing on the turbines of Air France aircraft.
- PEGASYS (Hoffmann–La Roche) is a once-a-week injection for the treatment of hepatitis C that works to reduce the amount of hepatitis C virus in the body.
- Pegasus is the mascot of TriStar Pictures.
- Pegasus is the mascot of Metropolitan Filmexport.
- Pegasus is the name of a medevac helicopter based at the University of Virginia Medical Center that transports critically injured patients within 120 NM (220 km; 140 mi) of Charlottesville, Virginia. The name was chosen because it was different from most other medevac programs, and because of stories of Pegasus carrying wounded soldiers from battle.
- Pegasus is featured on the coat of arms of Robinson College, part of the University of Cambridge in Cambridge, England. The University of Strathclyde, in Glasgow Scotland, uses the online service PEGASUS (Portal Engine Giving Access To Strathclyde University Systems) to provide its students with information.
- Nike Inc. has produced a brand of running shoe called the Air Pegasus.
- Pegasus Mail is the name of an email client.
- A pegasus was used as the Pontiac Fiero's emblem.
- Middle Tennessee State University's mascot Lightning is based on Pegasus.

== Films ==
A Pegasus appears in the 1932 Oswald the Lucky Rabbit cartoon The Winged Horse.

Pegasus has appeared in several films, including the animated films Fantasia, Hercules, and Barbie and the Magic of Pegasus, the stop motion film Clash of the Titans and its remake Clash of the Titans, and as a codename in Johnny English and its sequels Johnny English Reborn and Johnny English Strikes Again.

In Disney's Fantasia, Pegasi are featured during the "Pastoral Symphony" segment, along with other mythical creatures, including unicorns and centaurs. In Disney's Hercules he is the winged horse sidekick and friend to protagonist Hercules. In Clash of the Titans, Pegasus is captured by Perseus before Perseus kills Medusa. This version changes the method of Pegasus' birth, being the sole survivor of a Pegasus herd after they were killed by Thetis' son, Calibos. In Barbie and the Magic of Pegasus, Pegasus is a winged horse who helps Princess Annika and is later revealed to be her sister Brietta, who antagonist Wenlock transformed into a pegasus after she refused to marry him. In Johnny English, starring Rowan Atkinson, Pegasus, portrayed by Tim Pigott-Smith, is the codename of the head of MI7; in the sequel, Johnny English Reborn, the head of the organization is a woman, portrayed by Gillian Anderson, who uses the codename Pegasus. In the Marvel Cinematic Universe franchise, Warsong is a winged horse who acts as Valkyrie's steed.

Project Pegasus is a secret military project in the Marvel Comics universe. In the Marvel Cinematic Universe, the project was a cover story for a faster-than-light drive built using Kree technology and powered by the Tessaract. After the ship crashes, Carol Danvers destroys the engine to prevent the Skrulls from salvaging it and gains superpowers after absorbing the energy from the explosion, becoming Captain Marvel.

A Pegasus appears in Jumanji: The Next Level as a flying horse avatar named Cyclone.

The logos for TriStar and Metropolitan Filmexport feature the Pegasus.

== Television ==
- In the anime and manga series One Piece, minor character Pierre, a bird of Gan Fall, can transform into a horse and a horse-bird hybrid due to eating a devil fruit. Another minor character, the horse Stronger, gained the ability to transform into a Pegasus after consuming the Horse-Horse Fruit, Model: Pegasus.
- Pegasus appears in Stargate Atlantis as a galaxy.
- Both versions of Battlestar Galactica feature the Battlestar Pegasus, which survived the fall of the Twelve Colonies of Kobol.
- Pegasus appears in the Long Ago and Far Away episode "Pegasus, the Flying Horse", voiced by Mia Farrow.
- In the Japanese anime Digimon Adventure 02, Patamon can digivolve into Pegasusmon using the Digi-Egg of Hope.
- In the anime Beyblade: Metal Fusion, protagonist Gingka Hagane uses the bit-beast Pegasus.
- In the anime series Gundam, one of the main spaceships, White Base, is a Pegasus-class battleship.
- In the anime Fairy Tail, one of the main guilds is called Blue Pegasus, with the guild's mark representing the name of the guild.
- In Sailor Moon SuperS, the spirit of Helios, the guardian of the Golden Crystal, disguises himself as a Pegasus while hiding in Chibi-Usa's dreams. In the manga, he was cursed into the form of a Pegasus by Nehelenia.
- In the anime Yu-Gi-Oh!, Maximillion Pegasus is the main antagonist of the first season and creator of the card game Duel Monsters.
- In Dengeki Sentai Changeman, Yuma Ozora's motif is a pegasus.
- In Gosei Sentai Dairanger, Shoji of the Heavenly Gravity Star's motif is a pegasus.
- Pegasus frequently appears in the 1960s series The Mighty Hercules as the titular character's steed.
- In Fate/Stay Night, Pegasus is the Mythical Beast used by the Servant Rider when she uses one of her Noble Phantasms, Bellerophon. As a reference to the original myth, where it was born from the blood of the decapitated Medusa, Rider, whose true identity is Medusa, first summoned Pegasus by stabbing herself through the neck.
- The Hasbro toy line My Little Pony includes ponies based on Pegasus. In the first animated special, Rescue at Midnight Castle, the pony Firefly is a pegasus pony. In the animated series My Little Pony: Friendship Is Magic, pegasus ponies are one of three distinct subspecies of ponies, with main protagonists Rainbow Dash and Fluttershy being pegasi.
- The Pegasus is a recurring motif in the manga and anime Saint Seiya, with Seiya becoming the Pegasus Saint. The series' theme song, titled "Pegasus Fantasy", was performed by the Japanese group Make-Up.
- The titular character and protagonist of the 2000 Kamen Rider Series, Kamen Rider Kuuga, can use a green-colored form known as "Pegasus Form".
- Kamen Rider Blades from Kamen Rider Saber has a Pegasus-based Wonder Ridebook compatible with his water-based weapon.

== Theatre ==
- In the Broadway production of Xanadu, protagonist Kira rides on Pegasus to Mount Olympus during the number "Suspended in Time".

== Written works ==
- The Companions Quartet by Julia Golding, including Secret of the Sirens, The Gorgon's Gaze, Mines of the Minotaur, and The Chimera's Curse, and To Ride Pegasus, Pegasus in Flight, and Pegasus in Space by Anne McCaffrey.
- In the manga Yu-Gi-Oh!, the creator of the Duel Monsters card game is Pegasus J. Crawford, known as Maximillion Pegasus in the dub and English manga. As well, there are Duel Monsters called Firewing Pegasus and Sapphire Pegasus. In the manga Saint Seiya, the Pegasus is Seiya's destined constellation, and he dons an ancient Greek armor in the form of the winged horse.
- Pegasus is the titular character in the Pegasus book series by Kate O'Hearn.
- Frequently mentioned in the Percy Jackson and the Olympians and The Heroes of Olympus series by Rick Riordan, Pegasus appears in the final book, The Blood of Olympus, as the father of pegasi, among them Percy Jackson's friend, Blackjack.
- A pegasus is depicted living with Wonder Woman aboard the Wonderdome, and aids her in her battle against the Gorgons and the Underworld. In the alternate universe title, Absolute Wonder Woman, a skeletal, reanimated Pegasus appears as Wonder Woman's steed, resurrected and given to her by the Titan Prometheus, which she rides in her battle against the Harbinger and the Tetracide.
- In Monster Musume, Pegasi are a subspecies of centaurs with wings on their equine half, with minor character Pegasania Bellerophon being a pegasi.
- Winged Victory from DC Comics is a Pegasus who is the faithful steed of Shining Knight.
- Winged horses in J.K Rowling's Harry Potter series are based on the Pegasus.
- In David Ossman's How Time Flys the spaceship that takes its protagonist to and from Planet X is called Pegasus.

== Video games ==
- In the video game God of War II, Gaia gives a Fire Pegasus to protagonist Kratos, who seeks to find the Sisters of Fate in order to change his past, to travel to the Island of Creation, where the Fates' temple is located.
- In the Nintendo DS game Heracles: Battle With The Gods, Pegasus is captured by Poseidon before being freed and reunited with Heracles after Poseidon's defeat.
- In multiple games in the Fire Emblem series, pegasi are mounted by knights and called Pegasus Knights, or Falcon Knights in their upgraded form. Awakening introduces the class Dark Flier, which rides on a black Pegasus.
- In the computer game Age of Mythology, Pegasus appears as a flying scout unit.
- Pegasus appears in the final scene of the 2600 game No Escape.
- Heroes of Might and Magic 3 features Pegasi being ridden by female elves as recruitable troops from the Rampart town.
- In the Olympus Coliseum world in the video game Kingdom Hearts II, Pegasus aids protagonist Sora in fighting the Hydra.
- In Quest for Glory V: Dragon Fire the Hero has to obtain Pegasus feathers as part of the main quest.
- In the video game Mega Man Star Force, one of the three versions, as well as the featured "Satellite Admin", is named Pegasus and resembles one.
- In Heroes of the Storm, playable heroes can use pegasi as mounts to traverse the battleground.
- The time machine in the Journeyman Project series is called the Pegasus Temporal Catapult, also known as Pegasus Device.
- In Inazuma Eleven, the hissatsu technique "Pegasus Shot" involves summoning a blue Pegasus. A combination version involving three users is called "Tri-Pegasus", which summons a large white Pegasus.
- In Inazuma Eleven GO, the follow up to Inazuma Eleven, and its two sequels, protagonist Matsukaze Tenma's personality is based on Pegasus. His keshin, a magical deity which can be summoned by its user, is a "Majin Pegasus", with the evolved version of his soul, an ability that lets the user transform into an animal, being Pegasus. As well, "Tenma", when written in kanji translates to "heavenly horse".
- In Assassin's Creed Odyssey, the player can purchase a cosmetic skin for their horse that turns it into Pegasus.
- In Fate/stay night, the Servant Rider can summon a pegasus that she rides with her Noble Phantasm Bellerophon.
- In Call of Duty: Black Ops 4, in the Zombies map Ancient Evil, the player can ride Pegasus to the "dark side" of the ancient Greek city of Delphi.

== Popular music ==
- "Pegasus" by The Allman Brothers Band
- "Pegasus" by System F
- "Pegasus", a California-based rock band, 1977–1986, with Tedd Armstrong, Steve Caton, James Bender
- "Pegasus" by The Hollies
- "Flying Red Horse" by John Gorka
- "Pegasus" by Ulrich Roth
- "I am Pegasus" by Ross Ryan
- "Neon Pegasus" by Parry Gripp
- "Perplexing Pegasus" by Rae Sremmurd

== Sport ==
- "Wild Pegasus" was the ring name used by professional wrestler Chris Benoit during his time wrestling in Japan, winning the Super J-Cup while competing under this name.
- Fusaichi Pegasus, a racehorse, won the 2000 Kentucky Derby.
