= Den of Thieves =

A den of thieves or thieves' den is any place frequented by thieves or other criminals. It sometimes takes the form of a thieves' guild.

Den of thieves may also refer to:

The term "den of spies" popularized during the Iranian Revolution for the Embassy of the United States in Tehran.

== Books ==
- Den of Thieves (Stewart book), a 1991 non-fiction book by James B. Stewart
- Den of Thieves (novel), a 2007 novel by Julia Golding in the Cat Royal series
- Den of Thieves, a play by Stephen Adly Guirgis 1996

== Film and television ==
- The Den of Thieves, 1914 short directed by and starring Wallace Reid
- Den of Thieves (film), a 2018 American heist action thriller film with Gerard Butler
- "Den of Thieves" (Castle), a 2010 episode of Castle
- "Den of Thieves", an episode of Di-Gata Defenders
- "Den of Thieves", a 2001 episode of the 2000 series The Invisible Man
- "Den of Thieves", a 1995 episode of Renegade

== Music ==
- Den of Thieves (album), a 2005 rock album by The Trews
- "Den of Thieves", a song by Armored Saint from Revelation
- "Den of Thieves", a song by Immolation from Hope and Horror
- "Den of Thieves", a song by Lizzy Borden from Visual Lies

== Other uses ==
- Den of Thieves (Dungeons & Dragons), a 1996 accessory for Advanced Dungeons & Dragons fantasy role-playing game

== See also ==
- Cleansing of the Temple, whose account in Matthew 21 mentions the phrase "den of thieves"
