= Company of Thieves =

Company of Thieves may refer to:

- Company of Thieves (band)
- "Company of Thieves" (Stargate SG-1), episode
- A thieves' guild

== See also ==
- Sly 2: Band of Thieves
- Den of Thieves (disambiguation)
- King of Thieves (disambiguation)
- Company (disambiguation)
- Thief (disambiguation)
