= Agustí Querol Subirats =

Spanish sculptor (1860–1909)

Agustí Querol
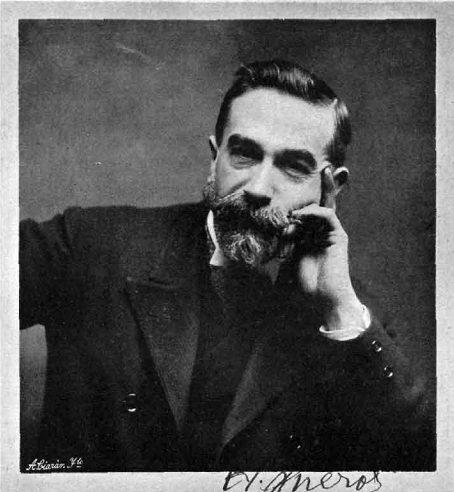
- Photograph by Kaulak
- Born: Agustí Querol Subirats; 17 May 1860; Tortosa, Catalonia, Spain
- Died: 14 December 1909 (aged 49); Madrid, Spain
- Occupation: Sculptor
- Years active: Member of the Congress of Deputies (1907, 1909)
- Notable work: Panteón Guirao; Monument to Méndez Núñez in Vigo

Agustí Querol i Subirats (or Agustín Querol y Subirats) (May 17, 1860 – December 14, 1909) was a Spanish sculptor, born in Tortosa, Catalonia, Spain.

== Life ==
Born to a poor family, the son of a baker, Querol was educated under Ramon Cerveto Bestraten (1829–1906). At the age of 18, he left his job at his father's bakery and moved to Barcelona, where he worked as an apprentice at the studios of Domingo Talarn and of the Vallmitjana Brothers. He also attended sculpture classes at the Escola Provincial de Belles Arts (called colloquially “la Llotja”). He studied dissection and anatomy at the Hospital de la Santa Creu in Barcelona, then won a scholarship to study in Rome.

Based in Madrid from 1890, he was responsible for many monuments, sculptures, and project proposals through much of the Spanish-speaking world. Querol's work is characterized by the same romantic style, fluid modeling, wealth of detail and technical skill as his French fin de siècle contemporaries like Jules Dalou, but Querol's work is even more dynamic and profuse. The pediment for the Biblioteca Nacional de España, for instance, is crowded with 19 separate figures. All of his major designs are equally busy.

Querol ran a relatively large studio. Among the apprentices in his studio were Lorenzo Coullaut Valera and Jacinto Higueras. Querol also worked as a businessman, dealing in Carrara marble; was involved in art expositions; wrote literary pieces under the pseudonym El Plutarco del Pueblo, the "People's Plutarch"; served as vice-director of the Museo de Arte Moderno de Madrid (1892–1895) and a Conservative deputy to the Cortes (for Roquetes); and was a man about town.

Querol died in Madrid, and is buried in San Justo in Madrid.

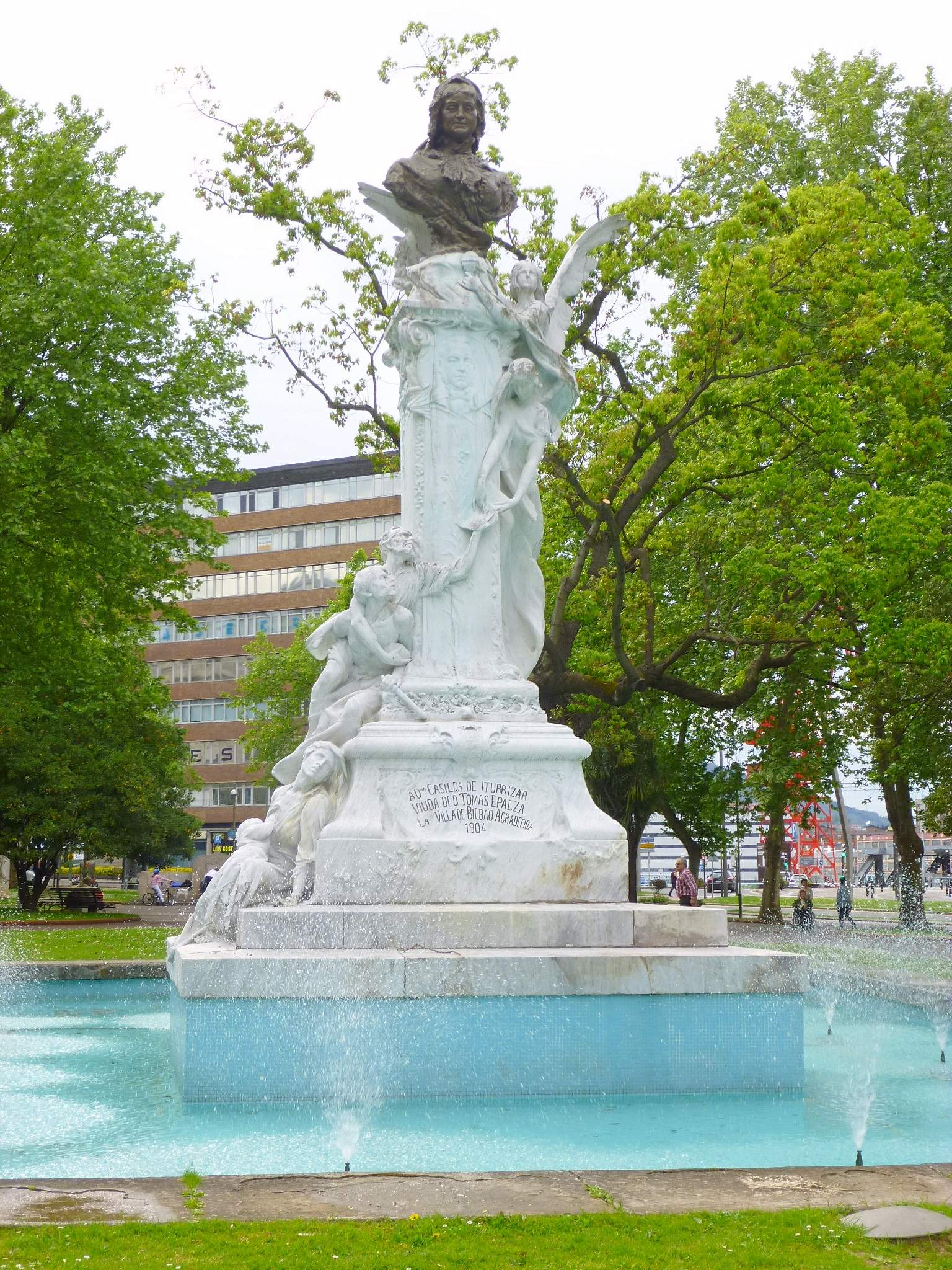
Memorial to Casilda Iturrizar created by Querol located in Bilbao's Parque de Doña Casilda Iturrízar.

He left unfinished monuments in Tortosa, Buenos Aires, Guayaquil, and Montevideo, which were later completed after his death. One example is the Monument De los Españoles in Buenos Aires. The elaborate sculpture, representing a statue of Liberty on a tower, with an extensive frieze at the base, all of it set in a pool with fountains, surrounded by monumental bronze figures dedicated to the Constitution of Argentina and the country's regions, was designed before Querol's death. It was begun in 1910, assigned to a replacement sculptor Cipriano Folgueras who then died in 1911, and further delayed with the tragic 1916 loss of the trans-Atlantic steamer Prince of Asturias, which sank with the loss of 457 lives and a cargo of finished bronze and marble sculptures. The monument was finally completed in 1927.

== Works ==
- Figures of Sagunto or Suicides of Sagunto, 1888, originally placed in the Plaza San Martin, Buenos Aires, now shown at the Buenos Aires Botanical Garden
- Finial figure of Spain with lion, two other figures and a full sculpted pediment, topping the Biblioteca Nacional de España, Madrid, 1892–1903
- The mausoleum Guirao Pantheon, San Isidro Cemetery, Madrid, 1908-1911 (finished posthumously)
- Monument to explorers Adelantado Legazpi and Urdaneta, 1890s. Originally located in Madrid, then transferred to Manila. The Americans completed the memorial in 1901 by command of General George W. Davis.
- Monument to Firemen, Colon Cemetery, Havana, Cuba, 1897
- Monument to Claudio Moyano, at the Plaza del Emperador Carlos V, Madrid, 1900
- Monument to Francisco de Quevedo, at the Glorieta de Quevedo (originally at the plaza de Alonso Martínez), Madrid, 1902
- Monument to the Martyrs of the Plaza of Spain, Zaragoza, 1904
- White marble mausoleum of Antonio Cánovas del Castillo, at the Pantheon of Illustrious Men, Madrid, 1906
- Statue of Frederic Soler i Hubert (Pitarra Serafí), La Rambla, Barcelona, 1906
- Monument to Casilda Iturrizar (the "Widow of Elpalza"), Doña Casilda Iturrizar Park, Bilbao, 1906
- Three allegoric sculptural groups La Gloria y los Pegasos, consisting of a middle multi-figural group of Science, Art, and Glory flanked by two rampant pegasus figures, all originally atop the Spanish Ministry of Agriculture, Fisheries and Food, Madrid, 1905. Middle figural group removed to the Glorieta de Cádiz roundabout in 1998
- Monument to the Siege of Zaragoza, Zaragoza, 1908
- Monument to Segismundo Moret, Cádiz, 1909
- Tower monument, frieze, and bronze fountain figures at the Monument De los Españoles, also known as Monument to the Magna Carta, Avenida del Libertador at its intersection with Avenida del Sarmiento, Buenos Aires, Argentina, designed 1909, begun 1910 after Querol's death, finished 1927
- four pegasus-with-riders sculptures, installed on the roof of the Palacio de Bellas Artes, Mexico City, originally from the Legislative Palace Monument to the Revolution by architect Émile Bénard

== Gallery ==
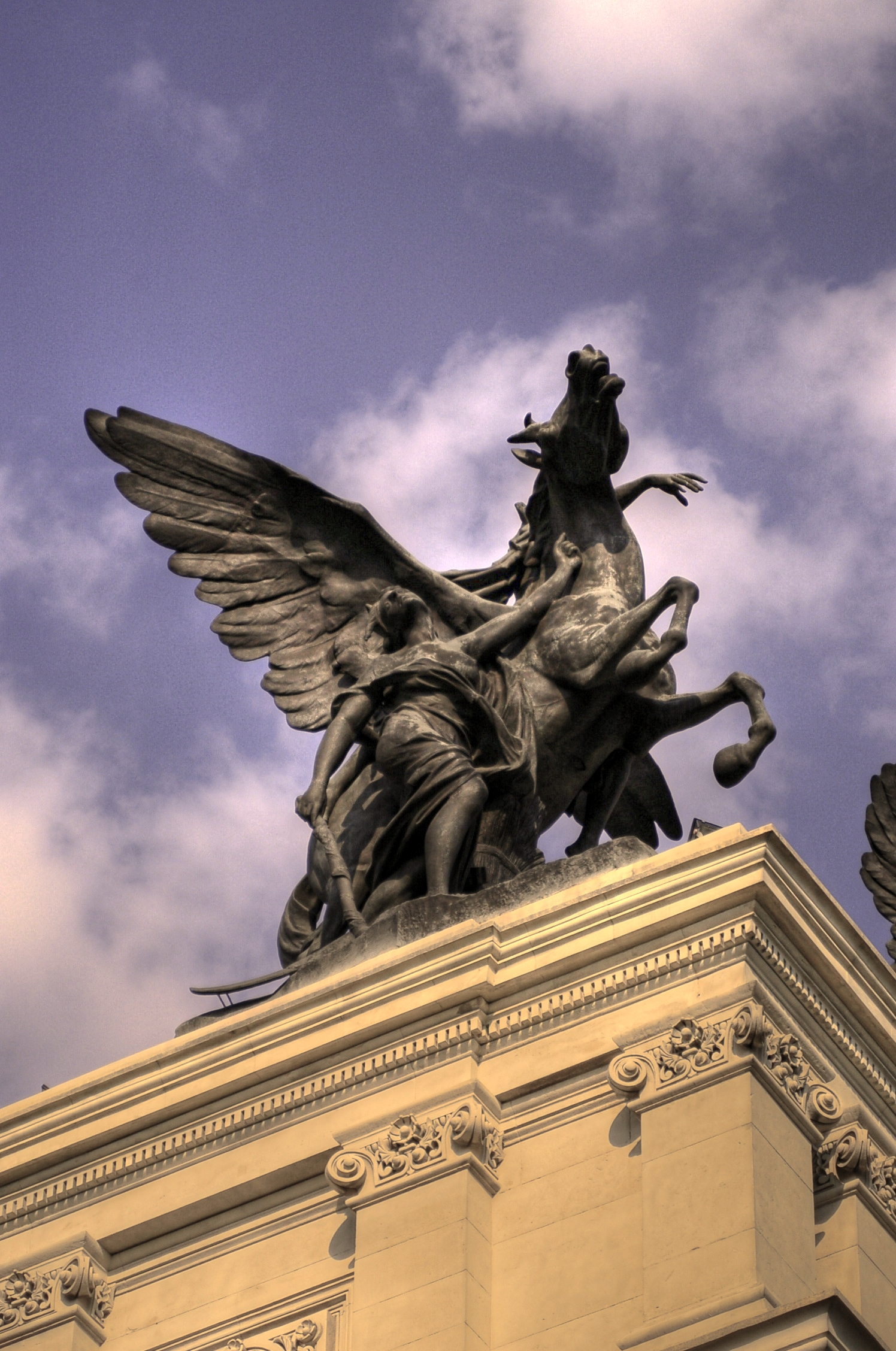
Pegasus and figure, atop the Spanish Ministry of Agriculture, Madrid

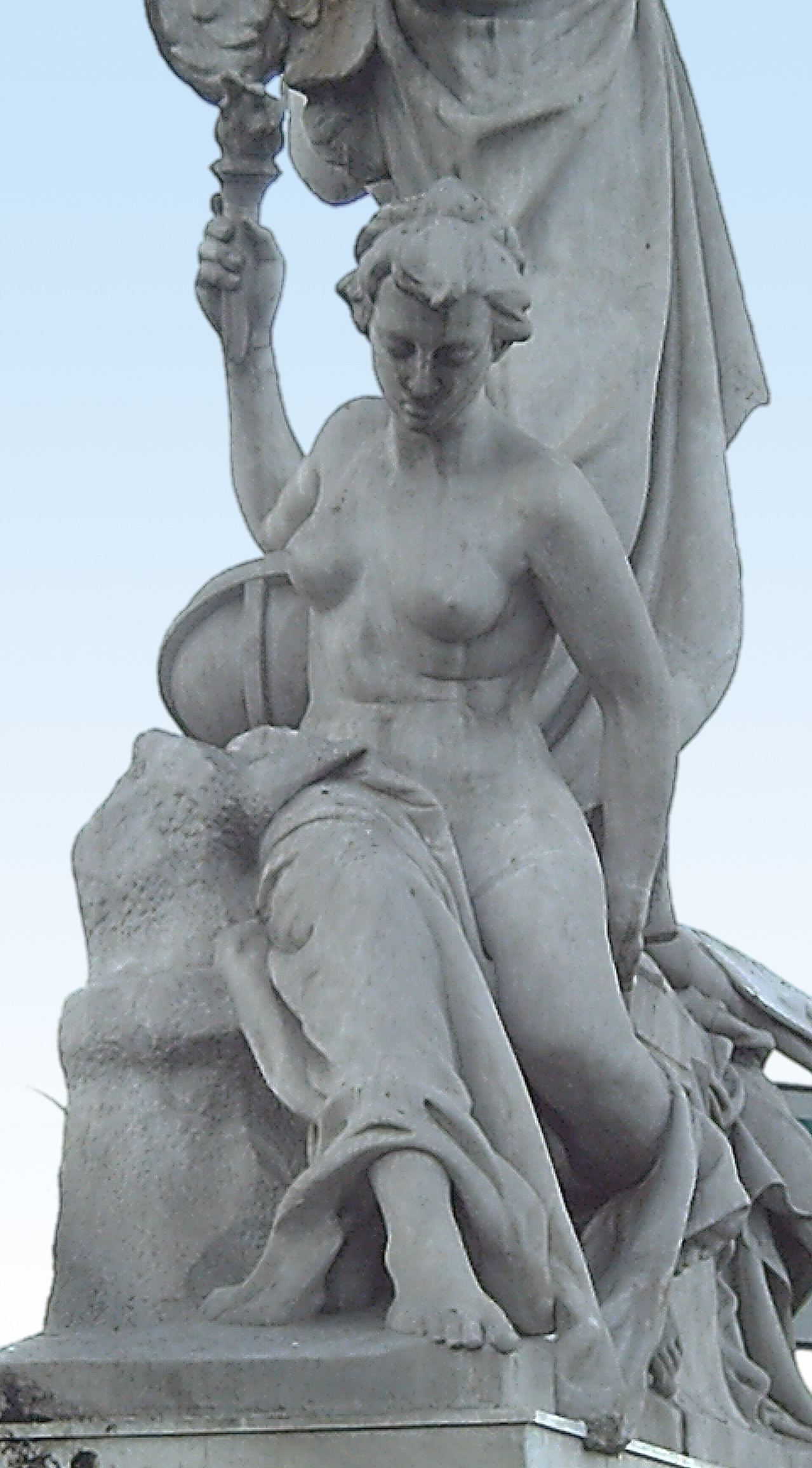
Science, detail of the finial group for the Spanish Ministry of Agriculture

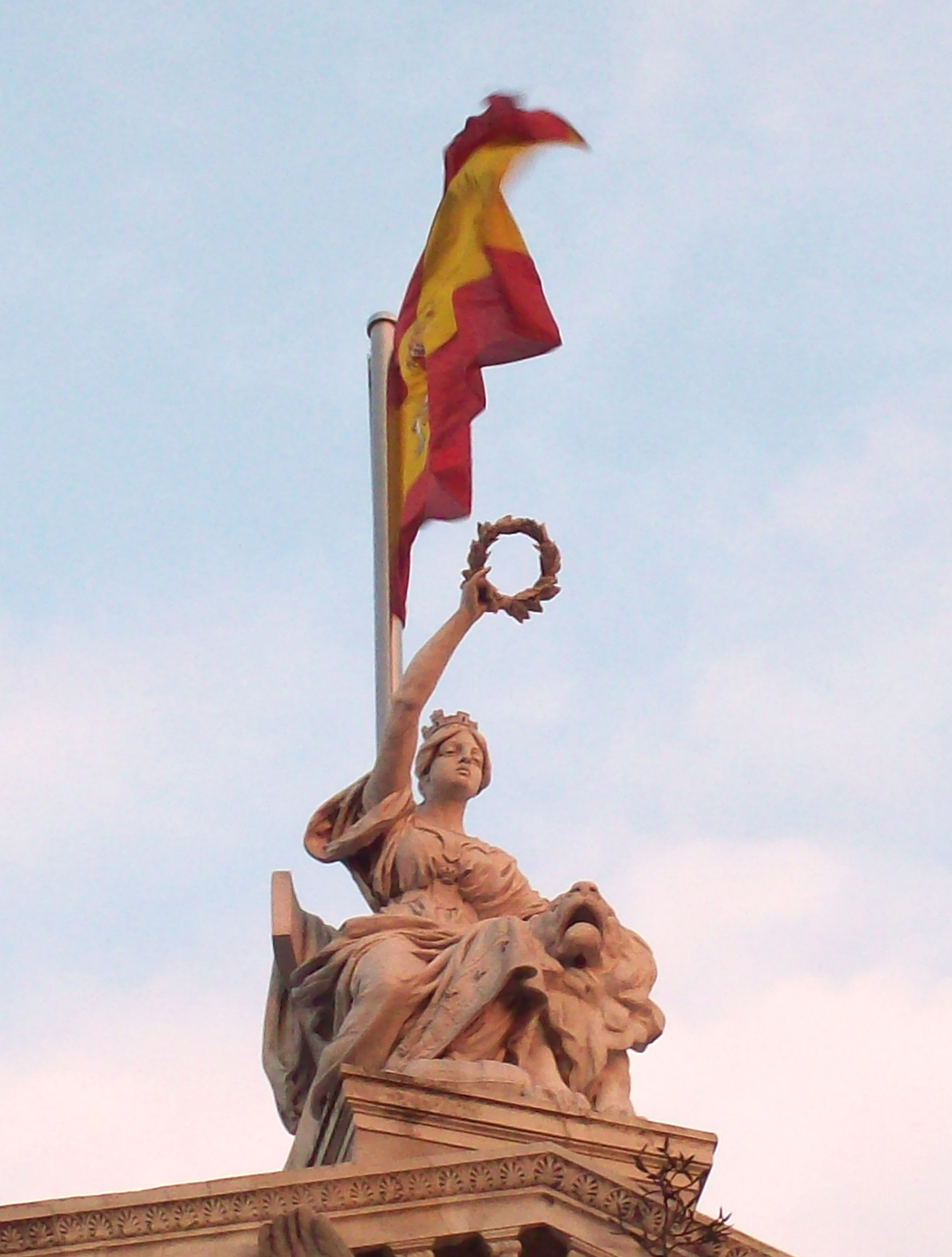
Finial figure of Spain with circular garland, atop the Biblioteca Nacional de España, Madrid, 1892–1903

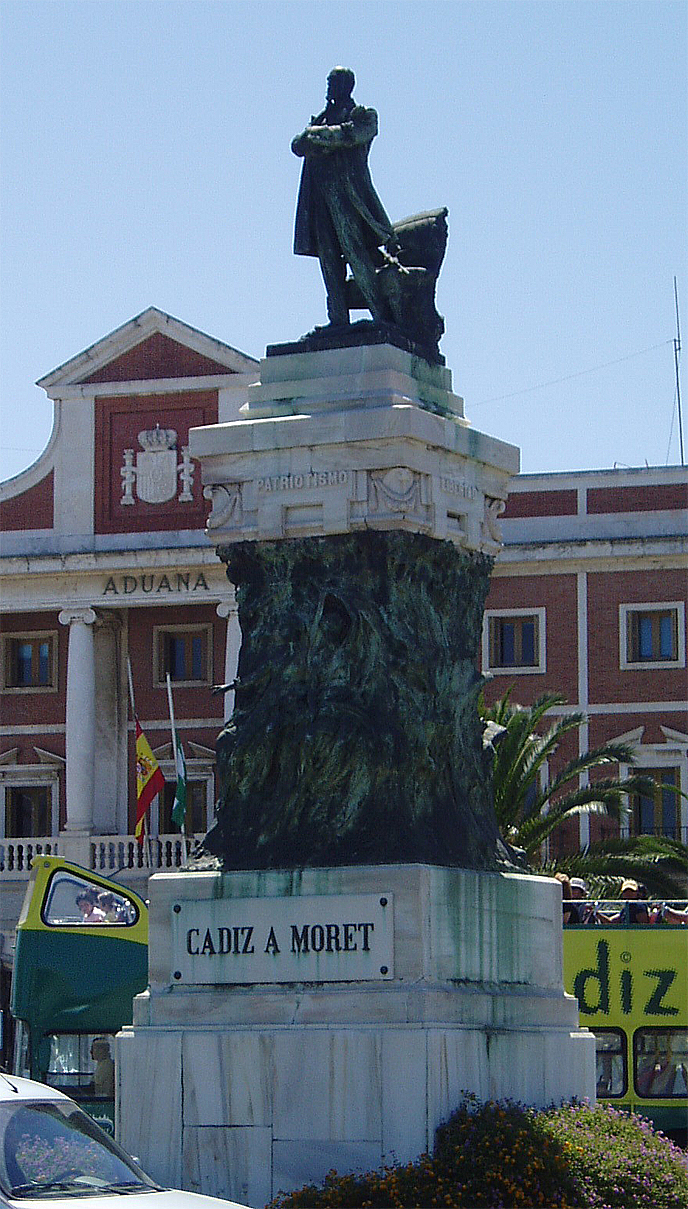
Statue of Segismundo Moret at Cádiz, Andalucía

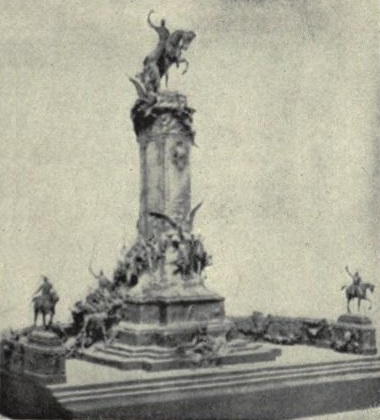
Memorial to Alfonso XII of Spain
