= Companions Quartet =

Book series by Julia Golding

- Secret of the Sirens; The Gorgon's Gaze; Mines of the Minotaur; The Chimera's Curse
- Author: Julia Golding
- Country: Britain
- Language: English
- Genre: Fantasy
- Publisher: Oxford University Press
- Published: 2006 – September 2007

Companions Quartet is a book series by Julia Golding, a British author who is also the author of the Cat Royal series. The majority of the series takes place in the fictional town of Hescombe in England.

== Plot summaries ==
=== Secret of the Sirens ===
Connie Lionheart is sent to live with her eccentric aunt Evelyn who she finds out is part of an organisation called the Society for the Protection of Mythical Creatures (or just the Society for short). Each person in the Society has a compatibility with a specific mythical creature. Connie finds out that she is a universal companion, someone who had compatibility with all mythical creatures, and that she is the first one in almost a century. The Society's main purpose is to protect mythical creatures from being exposed to humans, something which has become increasingly harder. Along with this problem, they also have to find a way to stop an evil shareholder shapeshifter called Kullervo who wants to wipe out all of humanity to make way for mythical creatures, and he wants Connie's help to do it.

=== The Gorgon's Gaze ===
Connie's aunt Godiva and uncle Hugh arrive in Hescombe to take Connie away from Evelyn to get her away from the Society which Godiva disapproves of. Despite Connie and Evelyn's protests, they manage to isolate her at the family estate. Meanwhile, the Society is busy trying to save Mallins Wood which is home to the last remaining gorgon. Only a handful of people know of the existence of the gorgon including Col as the gorgon is his mother's companion. Kullervo tries to use Col's mother to get to Connie however his plan fails and he instead kidnaps Col. While rescuing him, Connie becomes linked with Kullervo and even though she has the opportunity, she is unable to kill him.

=== Mines of Minotaur ===
Connie is unconsciously raising dangerous storms in her sleep. She initially refuses to tell anyone and swears Col to secrecy when he finds her asleep on the shore after one of the storms. She is then investigated by Mr Coddrington, who has become a new trustee in the Society. He manages to get Connie thrown out of the Society by making her look dangerous. While avoiding everyone in a bid to protect her friends, she stumbles on an abandoned mine where she finds several mythical creatures, including a minotaur, who are crippled and want Connie to heal them. Meanwhile, her friends in the Society have been trying to prove Connie's innocence. She is given an opportunity to prove her innocence at a trial but on the night of her trial, Mr Coddrington helps Kullervo kidnap Connie. Using their companion link, Kullervo starts controlling Connie's actions but her friends rescue her and help her to push Kullervo out of her mind.

=== The Chimera's Curse ===
A mysterious creature has been spotted on Dartmoor which Connie and her friends later discover is a chimera. The creature attacks Connie, seriously wounding her, and her friends have to rescue her from hospital as she needs a magical cure. Kullervo uses Connie's injury as a chance to steal her universal power which leads to a final showdown between Connie and Kullervo.

== Sequel ==
A sequel for the Companion's Quartet called Water Thief was published in 2011. It follows the youngest universal companion, George, and his best friend Malvin, a very rude Goblin. Together, they have to help the Society stop an environmental disaster. His first mission for the Society is on Zanzibar island where he has to investigate disappearing water sprites.
