= Cat Among the Pigeons (Golding novel) =

2006 novel by Julia Golding

Cat Among The Pigeons
- First edition
- Author: Julia Golding
- Language: English
- Series: Cat Royal
- Genre: Children's novel
- Publisher: Egmont
- Publication date: 2006
- Publication place: United Kingdom
- Media type: Print (Hardback & Paperback)
- Pages: 400pp
- ISBN: 1-4052-2423-1
- OCLC: 69732816
- Preceded by: The Diamond Of Drury Lane
- Followed by: Den of Thieves

Cat among the Pigeons is a young adult novel by Julia Golding, first published in the United Kingdom in 2006 by Egmont Publishing, and by Roaring Brook Press in 2008 in the United States. It is a story about Pedro the slave's fight for freedom. The main character is Cat, a girl of around 12 who is Pedro's best friend.

== Plot summary ==
It is London in the late 18th century, and slavery has just been ruled illegal in England but is still common in the British West Indies. Pedro's old slave master, Mr. Hawkins, comes to London and tries to reclaim Pedro as one of his properties. He is at first thwarted by Cat, but he vows to return.

Pedro's friends, Cat, Frank, Lizzie, Syd and the gang try to secure his freedom. Cat finds trouble following her once more as she is chased around London by the Bow Street Runners, coming for her arrest for biting Mr Hawkins after he taunted her. Disguising herself as a boy with the help of her friends, Frank and Charlie, she enters an aristocratic boarding school and learns Latin and fencing, things that girls are never taught. Cat is bullied for being clever and a 'pretty boy' by Richmond, the son of a plantation owner. When they find Cat with a medallion abhorring slavery Richmond and his gang beat Cat up. When Syd arrives, he's furious and wants to take Cat home immediately, but soon realises that she's safe where she is as the Bow Street Runners are still looking for her.

Meanwhile, Pedro is caught and held by Billy Shepherd for Mr Hawkins. Cat finds out where he is, but can't inform the police as she has no proof against Mr Hawkins. As Mr Hawkins is about to set sail with Pedro on board, Cat arrives with Lizzie, Frank, Mr Equaino and the Duchess to rescue Pedro. The Magistrate is called and Cat blackmails Mr Hawkins into setting Pedro free.
