= Casilda Iturrizar =

Spanish philanthropist and businessperson

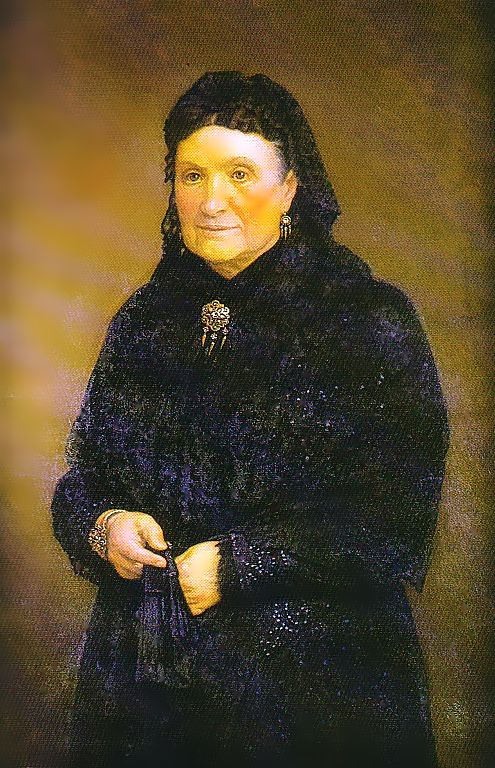
- Born: Casilda Margarita de Iturrizar y Urquijo; 1818; Bilbao, Spain
- Died: 22 February 1900 (aged 81–82); Bilbao, Spain
- Occupation: Philanthropist
- Spouse: Tomás José de Epalza (1798-1873)
- Parents: José Ylarión Iturrizar Basabe (father); Eugenia Nicolasa Urquijo Ziurtegaray (mother)

Casilda Iturrizar (1818 – 22 February 1900), also known as the Epalza widow, was a Spanish philanthropist and businessperson from Bilbao in the Basque Country. Iturrizar sought to help the most disadvantaged members of Bilbao society using her fortune for charity. The street where she lived, a hospital wing, and a city park were named after her.

== Biography ==
Casilda Margarita de Iturrizar y Urquijo was born in Bilbao, Spain. Her father, José Ylarión Iturrizar Basabe, was a merchant (b. 1799) and her mother was Eugenia Nicolasa Urquijo Ziurtegaray (or Siurtegaray). In 1833, after her father's death, Iturrizar joined the domestic staff serving one of the most prosperous merchants in Bilbao, Tomás José de Epalza (1798-1873), whom Iturrizar would later marry.

Epalza initiated divorce proceedings from his first wife in 1849 and the businessman was granted an ecclesiastical divorce, but it came without an annulment of the marriage, so officially, he remained married to his first wife until she died in 1857.

=== Marriage ===
Iturrizar and Epalza finally married in 1859. By that time, Epalza was making his fortune as one of the founders of Banco de Bilbao (1857), along with his cousins Pablo de Epalza Lecanda and Domingo de Epalza Larraondo. His other financial positions were many, including the Bilbao-Tudela Railway as well as the first modern steel company in the Basque Country.

After her husband died in 1873, Iturrizar took on the financial management of his assets. While she relinquished some of his holdings, she stayed involved with "banks and real estate, in addition to investing in railways (such as the Central de Vizcaya, the Bilbao to Portugalete or La Robla) or in coal mining (Hulleras de Sabero and Annexes)." She became the richest woman in Bibao after her husband's death.

=== Philanthropy ===
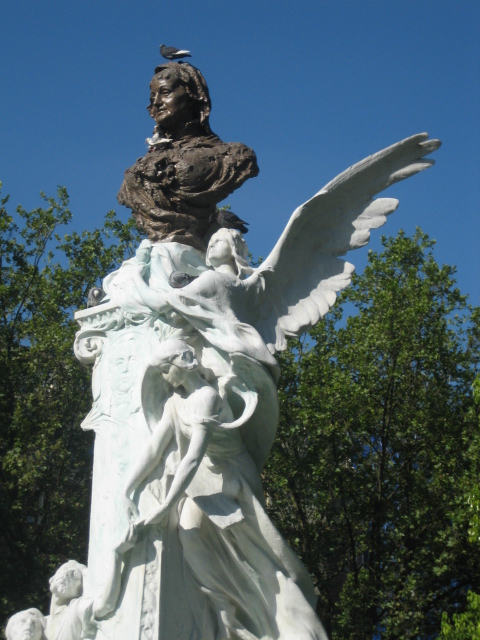
Monument in honor of Casilda Iturrizar in the Bilbao park named after her.

Iturrizar financed the construction of the Tivoli schools, later named in her honor, collaborated with the Bilbao Choral Society and created scholarships for outstanding students from the city's public schools. She also contributed to many Catholic organizations such as the Claretians of the San Francisco neighborhood, the Servants of Jesus de La Naja and the Augustinians of Portugalete.

She also invested in the Anonymous Society of the Bilbao New Theater, formed in 1885 and which built the Teatro Arriaga in 1890.

She also joined the Catholic Foundation of Schools and Workers' board of trustees in 1891 to advance its goal of offering "completely free teaching, moralization, recreation and protection to the working class."

== Death ==
Iturrizar died in Bilbao, on 22 February 1900.

She had no children or direct descendants so 7.5 million pesetas of her fortune (which did not represent the full amount), was bequeathed to many social organizations after her death, including the Casa de Misericordia and the Civil Hospital. After her death, Iturrizar bequeathed her income to a scholarship fund for Bilbao public schools which was started in 1902 and still operates.

=== Memorials ===
In Bilbao's large Doña Casilda Iturrizar Park, named for her and located near the city center, there is a monument to Iturrizar created by the Catalonian sculptor Agustín Querol.

One of the wings of Bilbao's Basurto Hospital was named in her honor.

Iturrizar is also memorialized on the Bilbao street where she lived, Viuda de Epalza, with a plaque that says (in Spanish):

"Year MCDCCCC. City of Bilbao, to the memory of Doña Casilda de Iturrizar. Heaven gave her great riches, which she shared with a prodigal hand with the poor of the world."
