= Monument to Quevedo (Madrid) =

Monument in Madrid

Quevedo
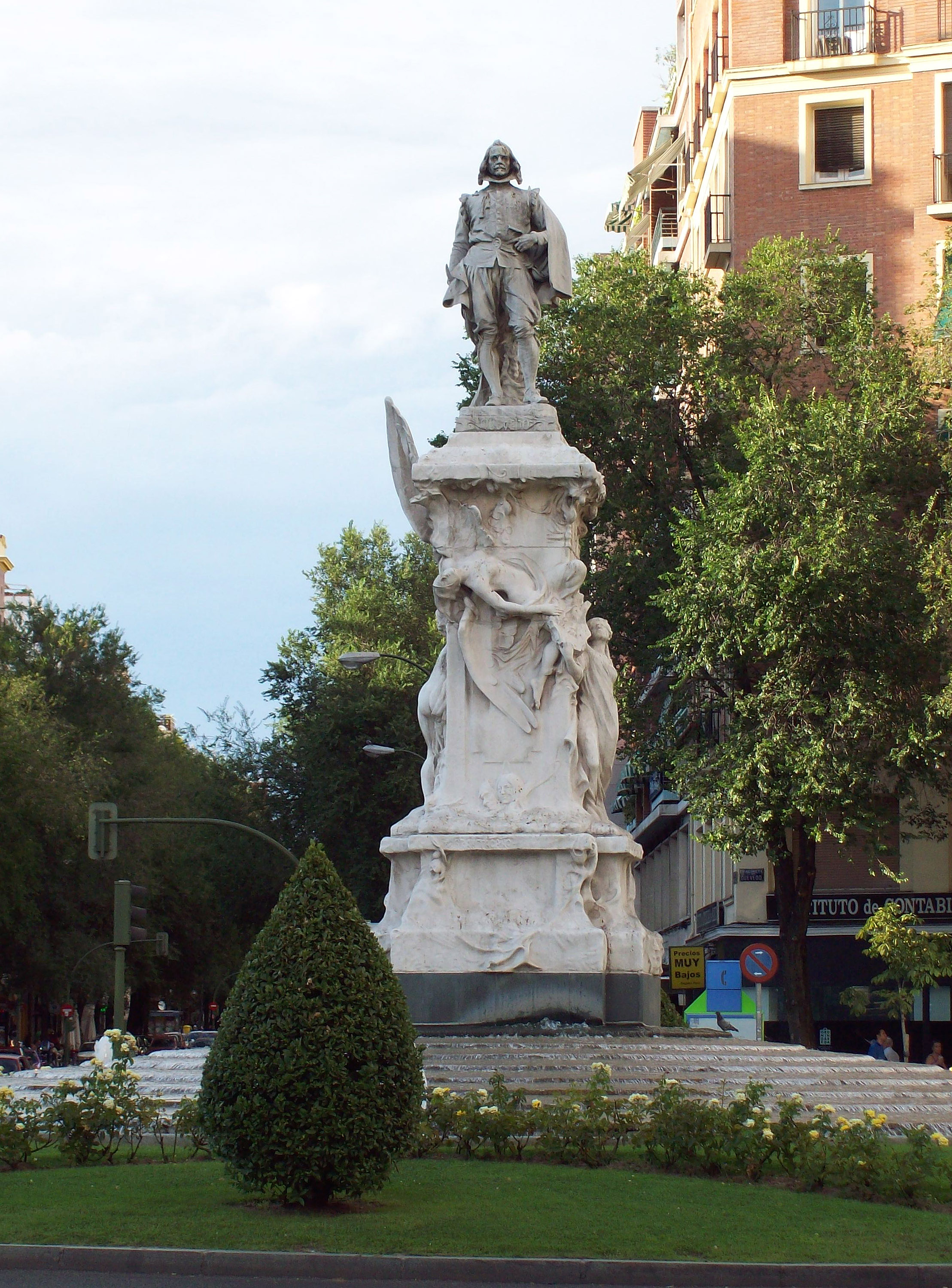
- Interactive map of Quevedo
- Location: Glorieta de Quevedo, Madrid, Spain
- Coordinates: 40.433627°N 3.704241°W
- Designer: Agustín Querol; Fernando Cruz Solís (replica of the original pedestal)
- Material: Marble, limestone
- Length: 9.00 m
- Width: 2.50 m
- Height: 2.50 m
- Opening date: 5 June 1902
- Dedicated to: Francisco de Quevedo

Quevedo or the Monument to Quevedo is an instance of public art in Madrid, Spain. A work by Agustín Querol, it is dedicated to Francisco de Quevedo, distinguished writer of the Baroque era.

== History and description ==
A work by Agustín Querol, it was unveiled at its original location in the Plaza de Alonso Martínez on 5 June 1902 (the ceremony had been delayed several times by bad weather) as part of a series of inaugurations of outdoor sculptures in Madrid on the occasion of the celebrations for the coming of age of King Alfonso XIII, featuring several notable figures such as—aside from Quevedo—Agustín Argüelles, Lope de Vega, Juan Bravo Murillo, Eloy Gonzalo and Goya.

The standing Carrara marble statue representing Quevedo is featured on the top of the monument. He is wearing his staple Pince-nez (called quevedos in Spanish after him) and the cross of Saint James on his chest. Four allegorical sculptures representing Satyre, Poetry, Prose and History embrace the limestone plinth.

The Novelda limestone from the pedestal eroded by the 1960s and the pedestal was replaced by a replica of (less porous) stone from Atarce sculpted by Fernando Cruz Solís. The monument was moved to its current location in the Glorieta de Quevedo in the 1960s.

A fountain made of granite from Badajoz was installed on the base of the monument in 1999.

== In popular culture ==
"A don Francisco de Quevedo, en piedra"—a poem authored by José Ángel Valente part of Poemas a Lázaro—is dedicated to the statue.
