= Statues of Pegasus, Mexico City =

Pair of statues in Mexico City, Mexico

Statues of Pegasus
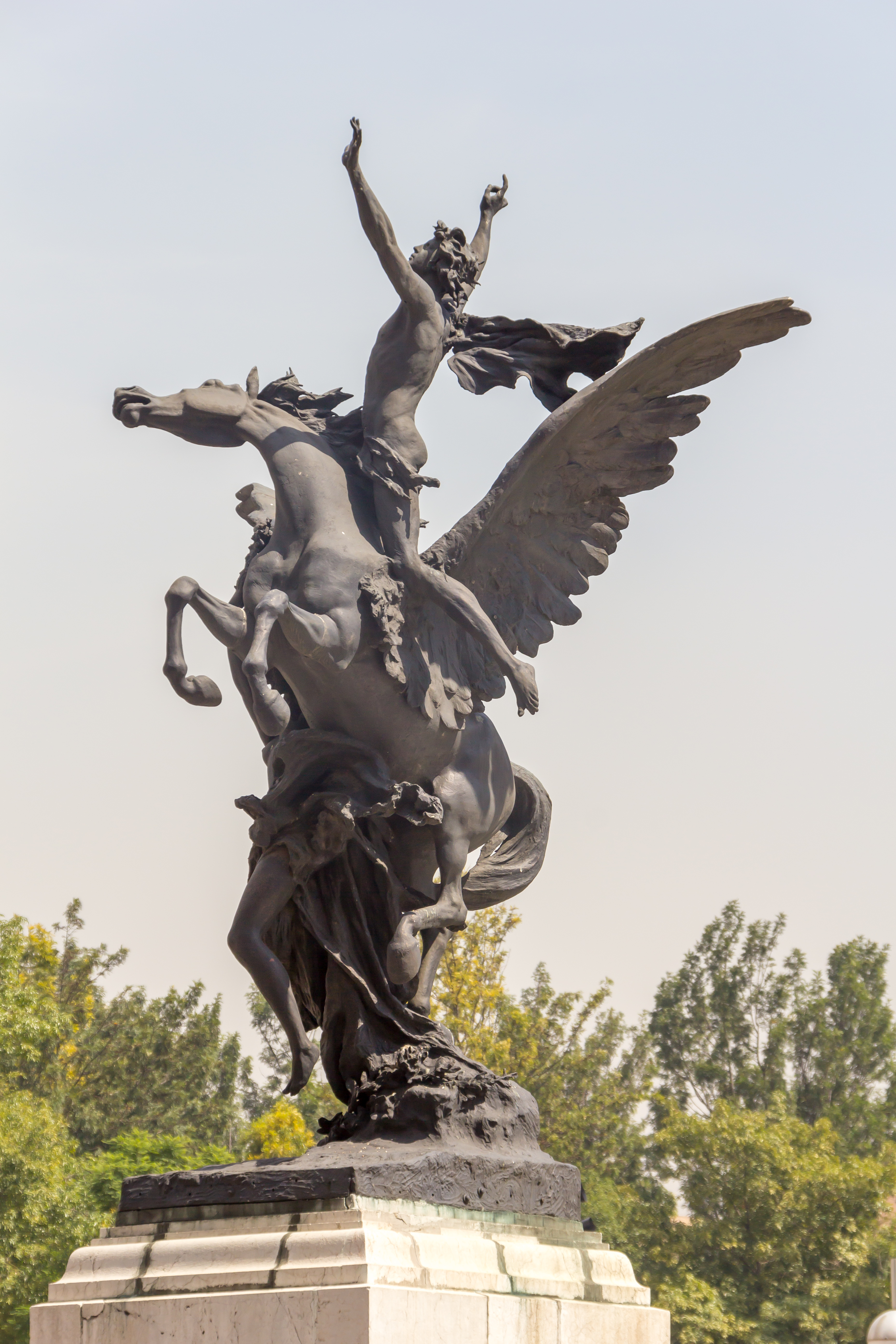
- One of the statues in 2015
- Location in Mexico City
- Artist: Agustí Querol Subirats
- Subject: Pegasus
- Location: Palacio de Bellas Artes; Mexico City; 19°26′5.76″N 99°8′29.91″W

The statues of Pegasus are installed outside Mexico City's Palacio de Bellas Artes, in Mexico. The four sculptures were designed by Spanish artist Agustí Querol Subirats.

== History ==
The sculptures arrived from Spain to Veracruz in 1911 and were installed on each of the four corners of the roof of the National Theater until 1921. They were then moved to the Zócalo (Plaza of the Constitution) in 1922 and installed on large marble bases at four corners of the garden in the square. Then in 1933, they were moved once again and installed in front of the Palacio de Bellas Artes.

== See also ==
- Pegasus in popular culture
