= Theft (disambiguation) =

Theft is the illegal taking of another person's property without that person's freely-given consent.

Theft may also refer to:

- A Theft, a 1989 American novel by Saul Bellow
- Theft: A Love Story, a 2006 Australian novel by Peter Carey
- Theft, a 2025 novel by Abdulrazak Gurnah
- "Theft", a 1991 song on the B-side for the single "Hit" (The Sugarcubes song)
- "Theft", a 1992 mistitling of "If I Had You" by All About Eve from Winter Words (album)
- "Theft", a 2016 episode of The Grind TV 1.0, with Fredro Starr

== See also ==
- Thief (disambiguation)
