= Black Heart of Jamaica =

Fifth book in the Cat Royal series by Julia Golding

- First edition
- Author: Julia Golding
- Series: Cat Royal
- Genre: Young Adult fiction
- Publisher: Egmont Books
- Publication date: 4 February 2008
- Pages: 432
- ISBN: 978-1-4052-3757-4
- Preceded by: Cat O'Nine Tails
- Followed by: Cat's Cradle

Black Heart of Jamaica is the fifth book in the Cat Royal series by British author Julia Golding. In this story the protagonist, Cat, becomes a pirate and gets involved with Pedro in a slave revolt.

== Plot ==
Cat and Pedro decide to earn a living as a duet of acting and playing the violin, as Cat feels uncomfortable at living with Frank, Lizzie and Johnny without working, and Pedro decides to go with her. Syd is very upset at the prospect of Cat going away from him again but puts up with it for Cat's sake.

In Jamaica, Cat and Pedro are disgusted to learn that slavery is still common and both are frightened and horrified when they discover that Pedro's former owner, Mr Hawkins is in Jamaica. Mr Hawkins thinks that slavery is lawful and fair, and he still believes that Pedro belongs to him. He taunts Cat after her performance on stage and then finally kidnaps her. At his plantation Cat falls ill with malaria and while she is still delusional and sick Billy rescues her. He forces her to buy a slave which Pedro is disgusted at, but he soon learns to forgive Cat. In the end Cat gets involved in a slave revolt but Pedro tells her to leave, while he will stay and help his fellow men gain their rights of freedom and equality. Cat is heartbroken to leave Pedro alone but she knows she must, so she and Billy leave together.
