= Mel Foster and the Demon Butler =

2015 gothic children's novel by Julia Golding

- First edition cover
- Author: Julia Golding
- Language: English
- Genre: Children's historical fantasy
- Set in: The Arctic & London
- Publisher: Egmont Publishing
- Publication date: August 2015
- Publication place: United Kingdom
- Media type: Print paperback
- Pages: 288
- ISBN: 978-1405277341
- Followed by: Mel Foster and the Time Machine

Mel Foster and the Demon Butler is a 2015 gothic children's novel by Julia Golding. Golding also writes under the pen names of Joss Stirling and Eve Edwards. Mel Foster and the Demon Butler has been published by Egmont Publishing in August 2015. The publishing deal was announced in January 2015. The novel is the first book in an adventure series. The next book, Mel Foster and the Time Machine, was published in April 2016.

== Plot ==
Mel Foster is an orphan, growing up in Victorian England, when he is sent away from the orphanage to work on a ship called The Albatross. When The Albatross gets stuck in ice, Mel accidentally discovers the body of a giantess frozen within the ice. Mr Wallace, a scientist travelling on the ship, convinces Captain Mariner to bring the "monster" back to England, to show Queen Victoria, who will surely pay handsomely to see the monster.

Mel, left to look after the frozen specimen accidentally revives the giantess back to life. However, Eve Frankenstein is not actually a monster. Luckily, she does not want to eat Mel―she wants to protect him.

While Eve and Mel develop a friendship in the Arctic, events in England suggest unusual activity at Buckingham Palace. The Queen’s butler is depicted as having significant influence over the monarch and is involved in a plan that threatens the stability of the British Empire. Mel, Evie, and a group of characters attempt to prevent this outcome.

== The Setting ==
Mel Foster and the Demon Butler starts off in the Arctic during Queen Victoria's reign. Most of the novel is set in London, England.

== The characters ==
=== Main characters ===
- Mel Foster: Mel is the main character in the book. He is an orphan with a mystery surrounding his parentage.
- Eve Frankestein: Eve is the daughter of Frankenstein's Monster

=== Secondary characters ===
- Doctor Foster: The man who delivered Mel Foster to the orphanage after he was born
- Viorica: Viorica is Lady Viorica Dracula, Count Dracula's little sister and part of the Monster Resistance
- Abel and Cain Jekyll: The twin sons of Dr Jekyll (or should that be Hyde?), they are the leaders of the Monster Resistance

== Publishing Details ==
- Author: Julia Golding
- First published: August 2015
- ISBN 978-1405277341
- Publisher: Egmont Publishing
- Age range: 9+ years
- Genre: Children's Fantasy Adventure Series
