= Doña Casilda Iturrizar Park =

Park in Bilbao, Spain

Coordinates: 43°15′57″N 2°56′28″W

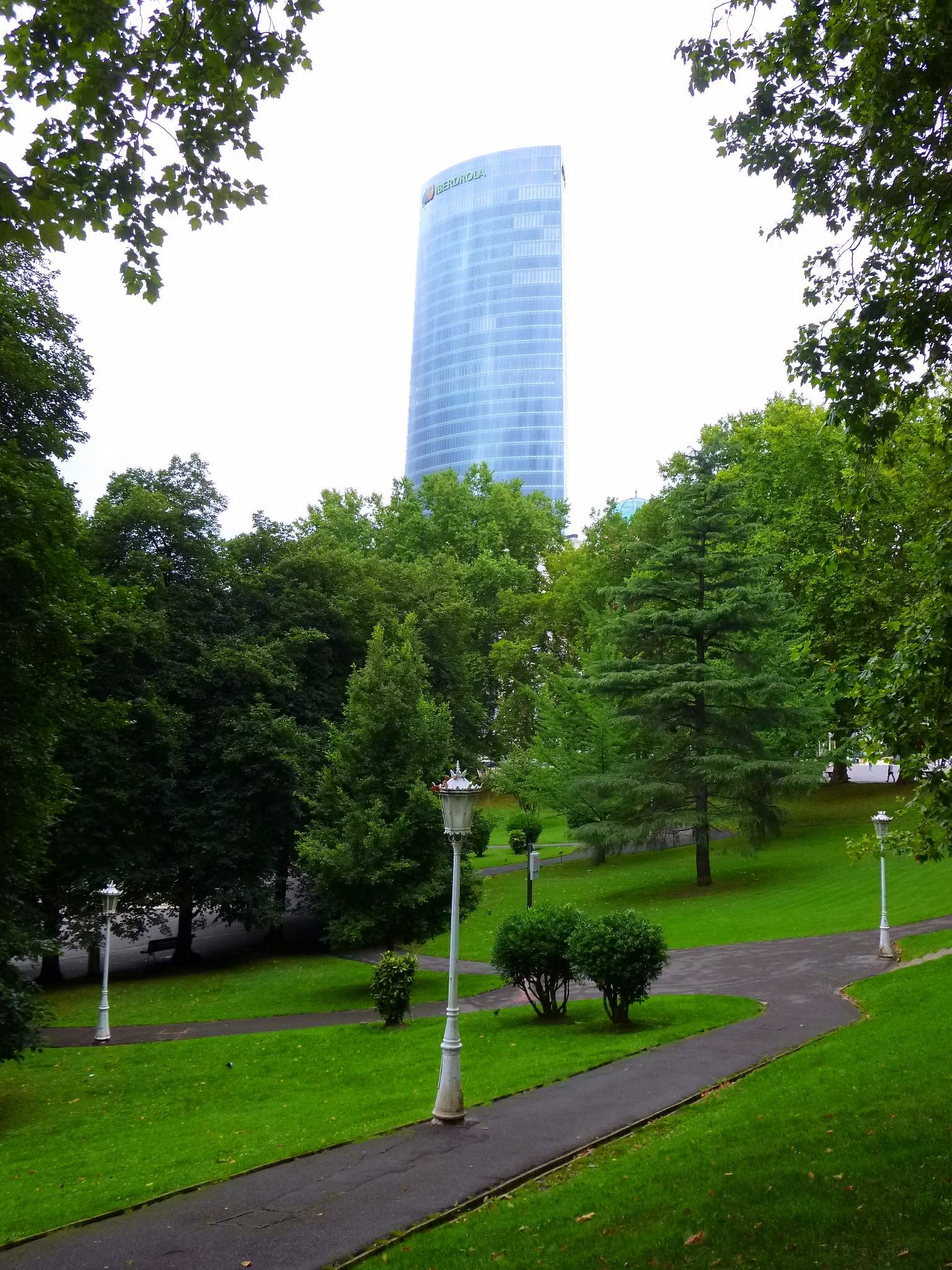
- Interactive map of Doña Casilda Iturrizar Park
- Type: Urban park
- Location: Indautxu, Bilbao, Spain
- Area: 8.52 ha
- Created: 1907
- Open: All year

Doña Casilda Iturrizar Park is a public park located in the city of Bilbao (Basque Autonomous Community, Spain), in the central neighbourhood of Indautxu. It is named after Casilda Iturrizar (1818 – 1900), who donated the land and was a prominent philanthropist in the city.

Until a few years ago, it was the only green space in the city.

It features an English-style garden created more than 100 years ago, which highlights the perfectly preserved examples of many centenary tree species.

== Attractions ==
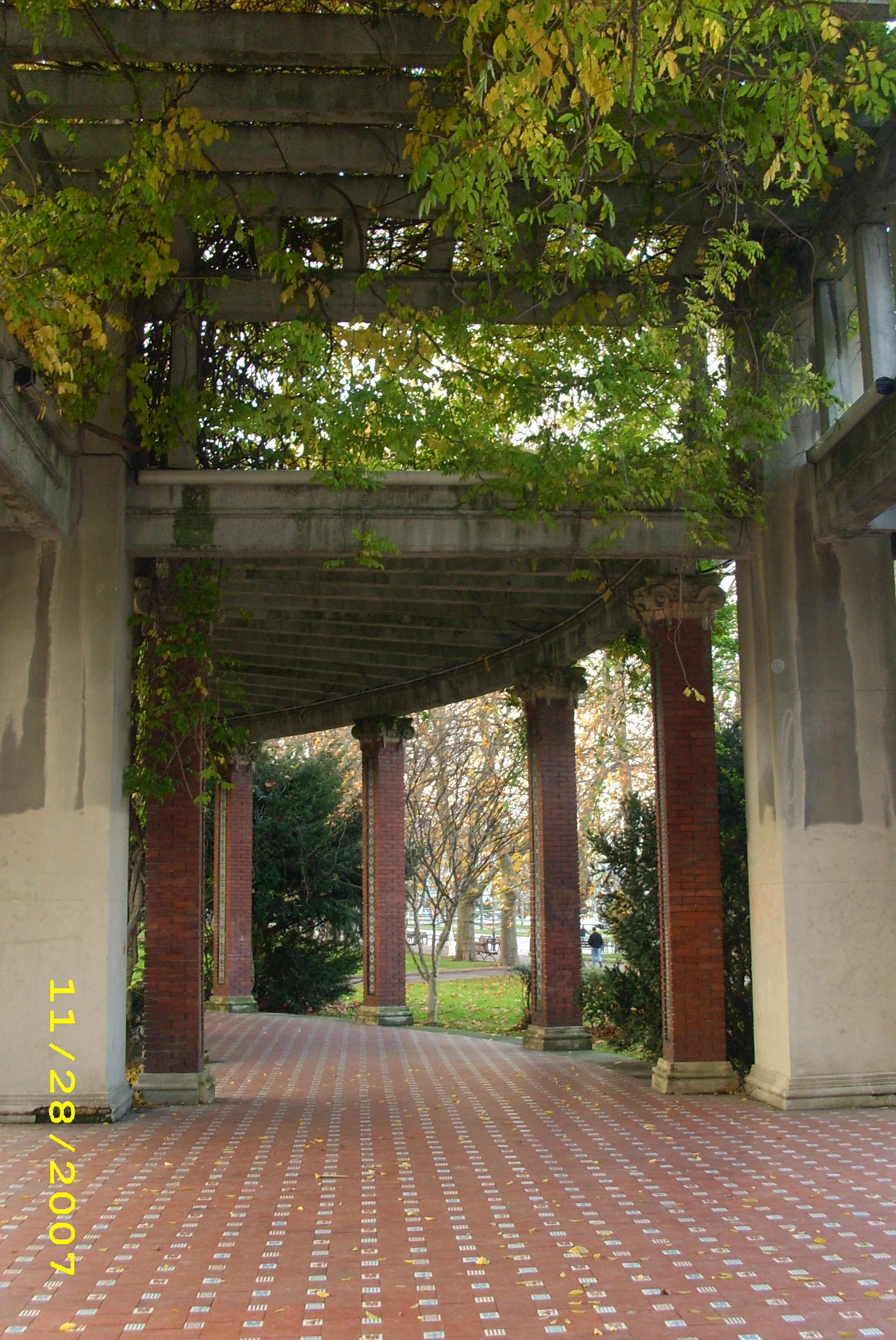
Inside the pergola.

The park contains a duck pond with several species of waterfowl. Because of this pond, it is popularly known among local residents as Parque de los Patos, or "Duck Park".

It also has a cybernetic fountain, which offers sound and light shows during holiday periods. The fountain is surrounded by a shaded walkway, commonly referred to as a pergola, and by an open area used for concerts and other public events.

== History ==
The park lost ground during the 20th century, when the Bilbao Fine Arts Museum was constructed entirely inside the park. The so-called park road, a four lane access to the city centre, was created in the northern edge of the park. More recently, since 2006, the Abandoibarra project has allowed the park to enhance the green area, by removing the park road and enlarging the park over the former shipyards of Euskalduna.

The park remains the main green space of the city, although it is no longer the only one.
