= Secret of the Sirens =

2006 novel by Julia Golding

The Secret of the Sirens
- First edition cover
- Author: Julia Golding
- Cover artist: David Wyatt
- Language: English
- Series: Companions Quartet
- Genre: Fantasy
- Publisher: Oxford University Press
- Publication date: 2006
- Publication place: United Kingdom
- Media type: Print (Hardback & Paperback)
- Pages: 401 pp (first edition, paperback)
- ISBN: 0-19-275460-2
- OCLC: 68260678
- Followed by: The Gorgon's Gaze

Secret of the Sirens is a fantasy novel by British writer Julia Golding. It is the first book of the Companions Quartet. The other three books in the quartet are The Gorgon's Gaze, Mines of the Minotaur, and The Chimera's Curse.

== Plot summary ==
The novel takes place in the southern regions of Great Britain in the fictional seaside town of Hescombe. Connie Lionheart is 11 years old, and her parents have left her with her Aunt Evelyn. Connie is able to communicate with animals and sense their actual being. She discovers that creatures considered to be mythical actually exist, and there is a secret society which protects them from humans called Society for the Protection of Mythical Creatures. Connie realizes that her aunt is a member of the society. The society is under threat by Kullervo, a powerful evil force, who is gathering an army of creatures that want to reclaim their place on earth and exist. These creature want to eradicate humans and create a new world for themselves. Connie is a companion to mythical creatures, and she and her friends in the society, including Col Clamworthy, protect them, fight Kullervo, and prevent ocean pollution by an oil company.

== Characters ==
=== Members of the society ===
- Connie Lionheart is an 11-year-old girl who recently moved to Hescombe. She is a Society member and Universal Companion, but her special companion is the golden dragon Argand. She can talk to animals and all magical creatures. She has "mismatched" eyes (Heterochromia) and black hair.
- Colin (Col) Clamworthy is an 11-year-old boy who is a resident of Hescombe. He is a Society member, member of the Two-Fours, and Companion to the Pegasus species, specifically Skylark. He has mismatched eyes like Connie. He owns a horse named Mags, and he can talk not only to pegasi but also to horses and ponies.
  - Skylark is a young Pegasus who is a Society member in the company of the Two-Fours and Companion to Col
- Evelyn Lionheart is Connie's aunt, a resident of Hescombe, Society member, member of the Two-Fours, and Companion to the Banshee species.
- Lavinia Clamworthy is Col's Grandmother, a resident of Hescombe, Society member, member of the Elementals, and Companion to the Water Sprite species, specifically Issoon.
- Aneena Nuruddin is Connie's best friend, resident of Hescombe, and the school gossip.
- Jane Benedict is Connie's best friend, resident of Hescombe, and a rather smart peacemaker.
- Mack Clamworthy is Col's father, traveler, Society member, and Companion to the Kraken species.
- Dr Brock is a Society member, member of the Sea Snakes, and Companion to the Dragon species, specifically Argot.
- Jessica Moss is a Society member, member of the Sea Snakes, and Companion to the Selkie species, specifically Arran.
- Ivor Coddrington is a Society member, member of the Elementals, and Companion to the Weather Giant species, specifically Hoo. He is also the Assessor for the Society, and, at first, denies Connie admission into the Society.
- Shirley Masterson is a Society member, member of the Elementals, and Companion to the Weather Giant species. She trains with Hoo.

=== Trustees of the society ===
- Kinga Potowska is Companion to the Dragon species, specifically Morjik. He is Representative of the Company of Reptiles and Sea Creatures.
  - Morjik is an old dragon who is Companion of Kinga Potowska.
- Eagle-Child is Companion to the Storm Bird species, specifically Storm-Bird. Representative of the Company of Winged Beasts.
  - Storm-Bird Companion of Eagle-Child. A Storm Bird.
- Kira Okona Companion to the Unicorn species. Companion of Windfoal. Representative of the Company of Two and Four-legged Beasts.
  - Windfoal Companion of Kira Okona. A unicorn.
- Frederick Cony Companion to the Rock Dwarf species. Companion of Gard. Representative of the Company of Four Elements.
  - Gard Companion of Frederick Cony. A Rock Dwarf.

== Reception ==
Secret of the Sirens was on the "Children's Choices for 2008" list by the International Reading Association and Children's Book Council. Kirkus Reviews describes it as "easily accessible...for readers who enjoy mythical creatures." Publishers Weekly calls the book an "entertaining read." It has been criticized for "shallow" characters and "trite dialogue."
