= Thief (disambiguation) =

A thief is a person who engages in theft.

Thief or thieves may also refer to:

== Games ==
- Thief (series), a video game series
  - Thief: The Dark Project, the first in the series
  - Thief (2014 video game), the fourth entry and a reboot of the series
- Thief (arcade game), a 1981 arcade video game
- Thief (Apple II game), a 1982 computer game for the Apple II
- Thief (character class), a common character in role-playing games
- Rogue (Dungeons & Dragons), one of the character classes in Dungeons & Dragons, formerly known as the thief

== Film and television ==
- The Thief (1914 film), an American silent film
- The Thief, a 1920 film by Fox Film
- The Thief (1947 film), a Mexican comedy film
- The Thief (TV series), an Egyptian television Series
- The Thief (1952 film), an American Cold War spy film starring Ray Milland
- Thief, a 1971 television film, starring Richard Crenna
- Thieves (1977 film), a 1977 American comedy film
- Thief (film), a 1981 American crime film, directed by Michael Mann, starring James Caan
- The Thief (1997 film), a Russian film directed by Pavel Chukhrai
- Thieves (1996 film), a French film
- The Thieves, a 2012 South Korean film
- Thief (TV series), an FX Networks television series which debuted in 2006
- Thieves (TV series), a 2001 American television series
- Thieves (play), a 1974 play by Herb Gardner
- "Thief" (L.A.'s Finest), a 2019 television episode
- I ladri, (literally 'The Thieves'), a 1959 comedy film

== Literature ==
- The Thief (Turner novel), a 1996 novel by Megan Whalen Turner
- The Thief (novella), a 2006 short novel by Ruth Rendell
- The Thief, a 2012 novel by Clive Cussler and Justin Scott
- The Thief, a 2012 novel by Fuminori Nakamura

== Music ==
- Thieves (band), a 1990s British pop duo

=== Albums ===
- Thief (Destroyer album) or the title song, 2000
- Thief (soundtrack), by Tangerine Dream, from the 1981 film
- Thief (Dan Mangan album), 2020
- The Thief (album), by Floater, or the title song, 2018
- Thieves (album), by British India, 2008
- Thieves (EP), by Shearwater, 2005

=== Songs ===
- "Thief" (Camouflage song), 1999
- "Thief" (Our Lady Peace song), 2000
- "Thief", by Ansel Elgort, 2017
- "Thief", by Caligula's Horse from The Tide, the Thief & River's End, 2013
- "Thief", by Can, 1970
- "Thief", by Imagine Dragons from the deluxe edition of Smoke + Mirrors
- "Thief", by Kayo Dot from Hubardo, 2013
- "Thief", by Ookay, 2016
- "Thief", by Third Day from Third Day, 1996
- "The Thief", by Relient K from Apathetic EP, 2005
- "Thieves" (Ministry song), 1989
- "Thieves" (She & Him song), 2010
- "Thieves", by Animosity from Empires, 2005
- "Thieves", by Rascal Flatts from Back to Us, 2017

== Other uses ==
- The Thief (hotel), a luxury waterfront hotel in Oslo, Norway
- Thief in law
- Thief knot
- Gentleman thief
- Whiskey thief, tool used by master distillers for sampling
- Wine thief, tool used by winemakers

== See also ==
- Theft (disambiguation)
- Burglary
- Pickpocketing
