= Cat O'Nine Tails (novel) =

Book in the Cat Royal series written by Julia Golding

- First edition
- Author: Julia Golding
- Series: Cat Royal
- Genre: Young Adult fiction
- Publisher: Egmont Books Ltd
- Publication date: 2007
- Pages: 400
- ISBN: 1-59643-445-7
- Preceded by: Den of Thieves
- Followed by: Black Heart of Jamaica

Cat O'Nine Tails is the fourth book in the "Cat Royal" series written by Julia Golding. In this story the protagonist, Cat, dances at a ball, dresses as a boy, and meets an Indian tribe.

== Plot ==
Since the events of Den of Thieves, Cat has been living with Frank and Lizzie. She is very happy with them, and then Frank's cousin Mr Dixon arrives. He is very nice to Cat and suggests that they all go a ball, even though Cat isn't a royal.

Cat gets a beautiful dress, but the ball turns out to be a disaster. Frank is very awkward and doesn't ask her to dance. Then Billy forces a kiss on her which both Frank and Mr Dixon witness. Mortified, they return home with Cat ashamed and upset. Frank tells her off for unladylike behavior, but they soon make up and go riding. They soon get a letter that their friend Syd has not returned home, and worried, they decide to check the docks for any sign of him. They are looking for a boat when they are savagely attacked by a press gang, who throw Frank, Pedro and Cat on board HMS Courageous and stab Mr Dixon in the stomach.

On board Cat is forced to pretend to be a boy by a sailor named Maclean. He threatens Cat and makes her do a lot of chores. Meanwhile, Syd is also on board after being tricked by his manager. He is furious that his friends have also been captured, but there is nothing he can do. Then Cat asks him for a fight so the other sailors respect her more, but Syd refuses. However, he is pushed into it by the Captain and Cat taunts him desperate to be hit, and Syd finally punches her after she remarks that he is a rubbish kisser and Billy is better.

Syd is really angry with himself for losing his temper but soon forgives himself after a heart-to-heart with Cat. Then Cat tries to run away when the ship docks but she is chased by Maclean. Cat is rescued by an Indian tribe and she befriends a girl called Kanawha. The Indian chief banishes Maclean and Cat settles in with the ship, but deep down she wants to return home. Cat soon discovers that Dixon had faked his own death to get Frank's wealth as he was broke. Enraged, Cat rides to Philadelphia, to a meeting discussing sending a search party out for her, There, she reveals Dixon's treacherous deceit and he is disowned by Frank. Frank finally summons up enough courage to ask Cat to dance, and then Lizzie gives birth to her and Johnny's first child, who is Cat's god-daughter and who is named after her, Catherine Elizabeth Fitzroy.

== Reception ==
Kirkus Reviews considered Cat O'Nine Tails to be a weaker novel than the preceding books in the series, noting that it "is a little too long, the adventures a little too forced and Cat falls a little too easily into and out of scrapes". They further noted that "Cat's always able to do whatever needs to be done. She's an impossibly talented tall-tale heroine, good at everything—except choosing among the bevy of boys who adore her." They concluded, "The once-fresh Cat's getting a bit stale."
