= The Chimera's Curse =

2007 novel by Julia Golding

- Author: Julia Golding
- Language: English
- Genre: Children's fantasy
- Publisher: Oxford University Press
- Publication date: 6 September 2007
- Publication place: United Kingdom
- Pages: 352
- ISBN: 978-0-19-275459-2
- OCLC: 137312912
- Preceded by: Mines of the Minotaur
- Followed by: Universal Companions Series

The Chimera's Curse is a children's fantasy novel by British writer Julia Golding, first published in 2007. It is the fourth and final book of the Companions Quartet.

The rest of the quartet includes The Gorgon's Gaze, Mines of the Minotaur, and Secret of the Sirens. A sequel for the Companion's Quartet called Water Thief was published in 2011.

== Plot summary ==
Connie is the world's last Universal, meaning she is the only one who can communicate with humans and mythical beings alike, giving her a chance to maintain peace between them. The evil shapeshifter Kullervo wants her power. He wants to destroy all humanity for wiping out the mythical creatures. During a scorching summer, Kullervo prepares for war. The serpent-like Chimera is only a small part of his deadly army. As the dangerous fire of Kullervo's hatred bursts into life, Connie and her best friend Col must stop him.

== Characters ==
- Connie Lionheart: about 14 years old, main character, Society member, Universal companion, close to Argand, Kullervo, Gard, Sentinel, and many other creatures. A shy girl that faces her fears to become the strongest Universal companion there ever was. Shows regards to Colin.
- Simon Lionheart: 12 years old, Connie's brother, Society member, Companion to the Nemean Lions, Amalthean Goats, and the great snakes, all of which, when combined, create the Chimera, a monster with three heads, one for each lion, goat and serpent.
- Colin (Col) Clamworthy: about 14 years old, Connie's friend, Society member, Companion of the Pegasus species, specifically Skylark. Like his father, he can get an easy conversation going in atmospheres that would normally daunt others. A great pegasus rider, is recruited to the British squad.
- Aneena Nuruddin: Connie's best friend, always looking for the latest scoop. Though she is always determined to get a way that suits her, she is a good friend at heart and a great ally to have by your side when your crazy great-aunt is determined to keep you prisoner.
- Jane Benedict: Connie's best friend, smart and ever the peacemaker. Though she may be non-Society, she is always a good friend to have and keeps a sensible head in the worst situations.
- Evelyn Lionheart Clamworthy: Connie's aunt, Col's stepmother, Mack's wife, Society member, Companion of the Banshee species. Since she is a companion of banshees, she does things that, according to those closest to her, make her eccentric, though she is a nice and funny woman.
- Mrs. Clamworthy: Col's grandmother and Mack's mother. She is a Society member and Companion of the Water Sprite species. The typical grandmother. She would be a normal senior citizen if not for her gift.
- Mack Clamworthy: Col's father, Evelyn's husband. Society member, Companion of the Kraken species. Though he often acts idiotic, he has a good heart.
