= The Gorgon's Gaze =

2006 novel by Julia Golding

- First edition hardback cover
- Author: Julia Golding
- Cover artist: David Wyatt
- Language: English
- Series: Companions Quartet
- Genre: Fantasy
- Publisher: Oxford University Press
- Publication date: 7 September 2006
- Publication place: United Kingdom
- Media type: Print (Hardback & Paperback)
- Pages: 352 pp (first edition, hardback)
- ISBN: 0-19-275460-2
- OCLC: 68260678
- Preceded by: Secret of the Sirens
- Followed by: Mines of the Minotaur

The Gorgon's Gaze is a fantasy novel by British writer Julia Golding. It is the second book of the Companions Quartet, and it continues the story from the previous book, Secret of the Sirens. The rest of the quartet includes Mines of the Minotaur and The Chimera's Curse.

== Plot summary ==
The Gorgon's Gaze takes place after the events in Secret of the Sirens, and follows the story of Connie and Col. Mallins Wood is under danger, and it is home to the only gorgon left in the world. Connie might be able to help, but she has been taken away by her great-aunt Godiva. Connie's parents have asked Godiva and her brother Hugh to stop their world travels to take Connie away from Evelyn and "wean her off of the Society." Thus, Connie is now living in the town of Chartmouth with Godiva and Hugh, where she's denied contact with any mythical creatures. Meanwhile, Col is introduced to the Gorgon, his mother's companion species. On his second visit, Col is taken over by a mysterious creature – one who appears to be a Pegasus, but does not feel like one. Col finds himself to be the property of Kullervo, an evil shapeshifter. Connie must go to save her friend, while remaining safe herself and not letting her great-aunt know she is gone.

== Characters ==
- Connie Lionheart – 12-year-old girl, recently moved to Hescombe, Society member, Universal Companion, companion to Argand and Kullervo; many-greats-granddaughter to one of the first Universals, Suzanna Caldicott
  - Argand:- A baby dragon, or "dragonet". She has a golden hide, which makes her resistant to fire and heat. Connie's companion.
  - Kullervo:- An evil shapeshifter, enemy to the Society. Wants to destroy mankind. Companion to Connie.
- Colin (Col) Clamworthy:- 12-year-old boy, resident of Hescombe, Society member, member of the Two-Fours, Companion to the Pegasus species, specifically Skylark
  - Skylark:- A young pegasi. Society member in the company of the Two-Fours, Companion to Col
- Sean "Rat" Ratcliff:- Friend of Col's. A non-Society member. He takes care of injured animals, and is the owner of a dog named Wolf.
- Aneena Nuruddin – Connie's best friend, always looking for the latest scoop. Though she is always determined to get a way that suits her, she is a good friend at heart and a great ally to have by one's side when your crazy great-aunt is determined to keep you prisoner.
- Jane Benedict – Connie's best friend, smart and ever the peacemaker. Though she may be non-Society, she is always a good friend to have and keeps a sensible head in the worst situations.
- Evelyn Lionheart – Connie's aunt, resident of Hescombe, Society member, member of the Two-Fours, Companion to the Banshee species
- Mrs. Clamworthy – Col's grandmother, resident of Hescombe, Society member, member of the Elementals, Companion to the Water Sprite species, specifically Issoon.
- Mack Clamworthy:- Col's father, traveler, Society member, member of the Sea Snakes, Companion to the Kraken species. Cassandra Lang's ex-husband.
- Cassandra Lang:- Col's mother, traveler, ex-Society member, Companion to the Gorgon species. Mack Clamworthy's ex-wife.
- Ivor Coddrington:- Society member, member of the Elementals, Companion to the Weather Giant species, specifically Hoo. He is also the Assessor for the Society, and, at first, denies Connie admittance into the Society.
- Godiva Lionheart:- Connie's great-aunt, firmly against the Society, ex-Society member, Companion to the Tree Sprite species.
- Hugh Lionheart:- Connie's great-uncle, laid back and easygoing fisherman, overall nice uncle
