= Cat Royal =

Series of historical fiction adventure books by Julia Golding

- 6 books
- Author: Julia Golding
- Country: United Kingdom, United States
- Language: English
- Genre: Children's, historical fiction
- Published: 2006 to present
- Media type: Print (hardcover)

Cat Royal (also known as Cat Royal Adventures) is a series of 6 historical fiction adventure books by Julia Golding, a British novelist.

The main character of the series is an orphan named Catherine "Cat" Royal. The series is set in 18th Century London where Cat lives in the Theatre Royal, Drury Lane, after she was abandoned on the front steps of the theatre and taken in by Richard Brinsley Sheridan, the owner of the theatre. The main themes are slavery and equality between people from all races and social classes. While the main cast of characters are fictional, some real historical figures, such as Olaudah Equiano, feature as supporting characters.

The first book, The Diamond of Drury Lane, takes place in January 1790, and the seventh book, Cat's Cradle, takes place in October 1792. Originally, the books had illustrated covers, but these were later replaced with photographic covers, with a model representing the protagonist, Cat Royal.

== Themes ==
Themes shown throughout the series include acceptance of different ethnic categories, and expressing the belief that it is not what one likes or social class that matters, but rather, personality. The theme of making one's way through adolescence could also be considered an aspect of the series, as the protagonist struggles to find work, and a home where she can be accepted for who she is and not be pressured into marriage and other issues faced by most young women during the time period in which the books are set.

== Characters ==
=== Main characters ===
- Catherine "Cat" Royal: An orphan left on the steps of the Theatre Royal, Drury Lane in January 1780 as an infant child aged two or three years old. She was taken in by Mr Sheridan, the theatre owner. Cat is very strong-willed, independent and feisty, though she does have a sense of humour if she thinks it appropriate to use it. Though often stubborn and headstrong, Cat is compassionate and caring towards her friends, and the lengths she goes to for them often leave her in danger, and leave her friends worried and exasperated. As an orphan, Cat is unsure of her age, but during the events of Cat's Cradle she believes she is about fifteen years old, making her twelve or thirteen at the start of the series. She is described as quite short, just over four foot four, with curly red hair and green eyes; in Cat Among The Pigeons, she crops her hair short when she has to disguise herself as a boy. Cat is an aspiring novelist and loves acting and living in the theatre. In Cat's Cradle, Cat discovers her mother named her Maudie, but that it was never her legal name because, due to her status as an illegitimate child, she was never christened; Cat continues to use the name Sheridan gave her.
- Pedro Amakye (previously Pedro Hawkins): One of Cat's close friends, a former slave and talented violinist and actor, also a member of Syd's gang. Pedro is very proud of his musical talent. Pedro is thought to be the same age as Cat, assuming her guess of her age is accurate, and is from Africa; Cat describes his skin as the "darkest" she has ever seen. Pedro comes across as kind, calm, gentle, quiet, and quite intelligent, though he can have bursts of an adventurous, and sometime even rebellious, attitude. He is also incredibly brave and strong, and can be counted upon. Pedro is independent by nature and does not like when people worry about him, though he cares very deeply for his friends. However, in Black Heart of Jamaica, Pedro decides to leave London to join a slave revolt in San Domingo.
- Francis, Earl of Arden, or "Frank": A mischievous friend of Cat's, and the only son and heir of the Duke of Avon, though he is somewhat embarrassed by his upper class origins, leading him to use a nickname. He is described as having curly dark brown hair and blue eyes; he is quite muscular. Frank is considered conventionally attractive, and is very popular with girls - in Cat O' Nine Tails, when Cat and Frank are in attendance at a ball, Cat observes that he is constantly surrounded by girls hoping to dance with him. Due to his better education, compared to that of his friends, Frank has an extensive vocabulary, and often casually uses terms his friends are unfamiliar with. He is a member of The Butcher's Boys, Syd's gang, though this remains a carefully kept secret from his parents. Frank is about sixteen years old at the start of the series; it is implied that he is eighteen in Black Heart of Jamaica, set two years after the first book, when his sister mentions that he has recently come of age. Initially a student at Westminster School in London, he begins attending Trinity College, Cambridge shortly before the events of Cat's Cradle.
- William "Billy" Shepherd: Billy is a recurring antagonist throughout the first three books, attempting to kill Cat in both The Diamond of Drury Lane and Den of Thieves, though he does save her life in Cat Among The Pigeons, but solely for the purpose of having her be in debt to him. However, from Cat O' Nine Tails onwards, he appears to go from antagonist to antihero, and manages to save her life again in Black Heart of Jamaica, and becomes her travelling companion on their way back to London from Tortuga. He affectionately refers to Cat as "Moggy", since she forbid him from calling her "Kitten" (a nickname given used by close friends). It has been hinted that he has romantic feelings for Cat, having kissed her in Cat O' Nine Tails, and attempting to do so again in The Middle Passage; on the latter occasion, Cat rebuffs his attempt by reminding him that he is engaged to Miss Abingdon, to whom he agreed to marry to settle her father's debts to him. He is nicknamed "Billy Boil" by Syd and his gang, due to a boil on his nose. Billy has been described as having dark hair, either dark brown or black, with grey eyes with flecks of green. Similarly to Syd, Billy speaks with a strong cockney accent, though it is mentioned in Cat O' Nine Tails that after his abrupt change in social status he has started to imitate received pronunciation when in public. In Cat Among The Pigeons, it is mentioned that Billy is eighteen years old, meaning he is about twenty in the final book – Cat mentions that there is an approximate five year age difference between them. Billy has a younger half-brother called Paul, who is nicknamed "Spike".
- Sydney "Syd" Fletcher: Cat's oldest and most loyal friend in Covent Garden, and leader of the Butcher's Boys, a Covent Garden gang. Syd is a competitive boxer, known by his title "The Bow Street Butcher". His parents own a butcher shop and live in the apartment above it; Syd continues to work in the shop when he is not boxing. He is in love with Cat, which he first makes clear in Den of Thieves by briefly kissing her on the lips, and he is planning a life for them together, although Cat is not so sure about this. While she appreciates him as a precious friend, she does not love him, and is afraid that the future life he envisions will restrain her from achieving her dreams of travelling and working in the theatre. He is described as being over six feet tall with blonde hair, and speaks with a cockney accent. Syd often threatens violence against any person who has shown hostility toward Cat, something Cat finds sweet but distressing. Syd is the same age as Billy Shepherd, making him about twenty years old in Cat's Cradle. His full name is Sydney, though he does not like his actual name and is very shy about it. In Cat O' Nine Tails, Cat also reveals that Syd is illiterate.
- Lady Elizabeth "Lizzie" Fitzroy (née Avon): The daughter of the Duke of Arden, and Frank's older sister, who considers Cat a dear friend despite their differing social classes. She is described as being very pretty, with chestnut hair and blue eyes. In The Diamond of Drury Lane, it is revealed that she met Johnny at her debutante ball and has been secretly in love with him since, and leaves in Den of Thieves to live with him in Philadelphia, and she gives birth to their first child, Catherine Fitzroy, in Cat O' Nine Tails. Lizzie is a passionate abolitionist.
- Lord Jonathan "Johnny" Fitzroy: The son of the Earl of Ranworth, though he rebelled against his family and failed to live up to his father's expectations. Instead, he started drawing satirical cartoons featuring members of the British government and publishing them in newspapers, using the pseudonym "Captain Sparkler". However, when the mysterious "Captain Sparkler" was made wanted, Johnny joined Theatre Royal as the new prompt, using the name Jonathan Smith, though Cat is quick to work out his true identity. He escapes London and flees to the United States of America in The Diamond of Drury Lane. He fell in love with Lady Elizabeth when they met at her debutante, and they are reunited when they both travel to Paris in Den of Thieves. When they get married and he changes his citizenship, Johnny stops his cartoons to become a proper artist, though he temporarily stops his work when his daughter is born in order to dedicate time to her. He is described as a "tall youth" with black hair and dark brown eyes.

=== Secondary characters ===
- Catherine Elizabeth Fitzroy: Lizzie and Johnny's daughter, who was born in Cat O' Nine Tails, and Cat's godchild. Lizzie mentions in that, despite her young age, she is already rather boisterous and troublesome, features that reminded her parents of Cat, inspiring them to name their daughter after her.
- Richard Brinsley Sheridan: Cat's patron and owner of the Drury Lane Theatre. In Den of Thieves he reveals he is going to knock down the theatre build a new one, something Cat does not like and makes her angry, and in Cat O' Nine Tails the construction work had already begun. Although he knocked down what Cat knows as home, Mr Sheridan has Cat's best interests at heart, and loves her as a father would love a daughter.
- Robert "Rabbie" Bruce: Cat's younger brother, a Scottish cattle thief found living with his father's family. The two are actually half-siblings, having the same mother and different fathers; Rabbie's father forced their mother to give Cat away, refusing to marry her with an illegitimate child in tow. Their mother died from complications in childbirth soon after Rabbie was born. When he first meets Cat, in Cat's Cradle, he is sceptical of her claim that they are related and does not want anything to do with her, though she is persistent. However, he eventually accepts her as his sister and grows to care for her, opting to go to London to live with her. He is taller than Cat despite being younger, has dark brown hair and brown eyes, and is about twelve years old. Rabbie speaks with a strong Scottish accent.
- Signor Angelini: Conductor of the theatre orchestra, and very passionate about music, especially his apprentice Pedro.
- Duke of Avon: Frank and Lizzie's father and duke of Avon.
- Duchess of Avon: Wife of the duke, and a retired singer.
- Kingston Hawkins: A cruel slave owner and Pedro's original master. Kingston claims that Pedro still remains his property and almost succeeds in getting him back in Cat Among the Pigeons. In Black Heart of Jamaica, he holds Cat hostage on his tobacco plantations and treats her like a slave, but then his house sets on fire and Billy rescues her.
- Joseph: Frank's footman and friend to Cat.
- Nick: Syd's right-hand man and assistant leader of the butcher's boys.
- Joe "The Card" Murray: A member of Syd's gang, a street magician and card sharp.
- Meat Pie Matt: Member of Billy's gang.
- Ferret Face: Another member of Billy's gang.
- Charles "Charlie" Hengrave: Frank's friend who helps Cat fool his teachers at Westminster School into thinking that she is a boy - specifically, that she is Charlie's younger brother Tom - when Cat goes into hiding from the Bow Street Runners in Cat Among the Pigeons. He appears again in Cat's Cradle, when he and Frank are attending Trinity College together and Cat visits the campus.
- Lord Fitzroy: Johnny's father, helps Cat out a difficult situation.
- Bridget O'Riley: An Irish girl who befriends Cat. She moves to London with her brothers, who ate working on the construction of the theatre.
- Mary Moir: One of the workers at the mill in New Lanark who claims to know the truth about Cat's family, and even confesses to being her kin. She has four children - Katrine, Ian, Dougie and Jeannie - to whom she is a strict yet caring mother. In the book, she is described as having dark red hair, and is in her mid-thirties. In Cat's Cradle she dies of an unspecified fever a matter of hours after revealing to Cat the information on her heritage. It is revealed that Mary is Cat's aunt, Cat being the illegitimate child of Mary's younger sister. She tells Cat that she has a half brother called Robert Bruce, who lives with his father's family.
- Katrine, Ian, Dougie and Jeanie Moir: Cat's Scottish cousins. Katrine is a quiet teenager a few years older than Cat who cares dearly for her family and grieves heavily at her mother's death. Ian and Dougie are boys of fifteen and thirteen years old who love adventure and can often get into trouble. Jeannie is a sweet child of about six years of age, she enjoys Cat's company and loves role-play.
- Mrs. Reid: Former head of wardrobe department in theatre, strict but loving motherly figure towards Cat.

== Books ==
- The Diamond of Drury Lane (2006) – The beginning of the series, in which Cat gets caught up in a mystery about an ominous "diamond" hidden within the theatre.
- Cat Among the Pigeons (2006) – Pedro's old master comes to London and claims that Pedro remains his property, and Cat must do all she can to keep Pedro safe.
- Den of Thieves (2007) – Cat is sent undercover to Paris with a ballet troupe to observe the revolution, but ends up involved with a gang of thieves.
- Cat O'Nine Tails (2007) – Cat and her friends are press ganged and taken on an unexpected trip across the Atlantic to the West Indies.
- Black Heart of Jamaica (2008) – Cat joins a theatre troupe in search of work, but, alongside Pedro, soon gets embroiled in a slave revolt in Jamaica.
- The Middle Passage (2010) – A short novella set during Cat and Billy's short stay in the Azores, and Cat has to help a new friend recover their stolen telescope.
- Cat's Cradle (2011) – Cat returns to London, only to discover that Mr Sheridan has received a letter from Scotland claiming to be from a long lost relative, and Cat is determined to go to New Lanark to discover the truth.
