= Cat's Cradle (Golding novel) =

First edition (publ. Egmont Books)

Cat's Cradle is the 6th novel in the Cat Royal series by Julia Golding and was published in 2009.

It is a young adult historical novel that continues to follow Cat on her adventures after being abandoned as a baby on the doorstep of Drury Lane.

== Plot summary ==
In this book, Cat's guardian shows her a letter from someone claiming to be her mother so Cat travels to the Scottish town of Lanark to find her family. She begins working in a cotton mill to get to know her family before revealing who she is. However, she ends up being kidnapped and has to rely on her friends to rescue her.
