= Julia Golding =

British novelist, also known as Joss Stirling and Eve Edwards

Julia Golding (born 1969), pen names Joss Stirling and Eve Edwards, is a British novelist best known for her Cat Royal series and The Companions Quartet.

== Biography ==
Born in London, 1969, she grew up on the edge of Epping Forest. She originally read English at the University of Cambridge. She then joined the Foreign Office and worked in Poland. Her work as a diplomat took her many places including the Tatra Mountains and the bottom of a Silesian coal mine.

Upon leaving Poland, she turned her attention to academic studies and took a doctorate in English Romantic Period literature at Oxford University. She then worked for Oxfam as a lobbyist on conflict issues, campaigning at the United Nations and with governments to lessen the impact of conflict on civilians living in war zones.

Golding lives in Oxford and works as a freelance writer. She is married with three children. The Diamond of Drury Lane is her first novel, the first of the Cat Royal series.

In 2007 Waterstones selected her as one of 25 Authors of the Future.

== Published books ==
=== Novel series ===
Cat Royal

1. The Diamond of Drury Lane (Egmont, 2006)
2. Cat among the Pigeons (2006)
3. Den of Thieves (2007)
4. Cat O'Nine Tails (2007)
5. Black Heart of Jamaica (2008)
6. The Middle Passage (novella, 2012)
7. Cat's Cradle (2009)

The Companions Quartet

1. Secret of the Sirens (Oxford University Press, 2006)
2. The Gorgon's Gaze (2006)
3. Mines of the Minotaur (2007)
4. The Chimera's Curse (2007)

Darcie Lock

1. Ringmaster (2007)
2. Empty Quarter (2008)
3. Deadlock (2011)

Dragonfly Universe

1. Dragonfly (Oxford, 2008)
2. The Glass Swallow (2010)
3. Ragged Wolf (2019)

Universal Companions

1. The Water Thief (2011)

Young Knights

1. Young Knights of the Round Table (Oxford, 2013)
2. Pendragon (2013)
3. Merlin (2014)

Mel Foster

1. Mel Foster and the Demon Butler (2015) - Victorian fantasy
2. Mel Foster and the Time Machine (2016)

=== Others by Julia Golding ===
- The Ship Between the Worlds (Oxford, 2007) – pirate fantasy
- Wolf Cry (Oxford, 2009); US edition, The Silver Sea (Marshall Cavendish, 2010) – historical YA novel about Vikings

=== As Joss Stirling ===
Savants

- Finding Sky Trilogy
1. Finding Sky (Oxford, 2010)
2. Stealing Phoenix (2011)
3. Seeking Crystal (2012)
- Challenging Zed (2013)
- Misty Falls (2014)
- Angel Dares (2015)
- Burning Yves (2015)
- Summer Shadows (2016)

Raven Stone or Young Detectives

1. Storm and Stone (Oxford, 2014); e-edition, Struck
2. Stung (2015)
3. Shaken (2016)
4. Scorched (2017)

=== As Eve Edwards ===
The Lacey Chronicles, set in the Elizabethan age

1. The Other Countess (Penguin, 2010)
2. The Queen's Lady (2011)
3. The Rogue's Princess (2011)

World War I duet

1. Dusk: a love worth fighting for (Penguin, 2013)
2. Dawn: a love worth living for (2014)

=== Other writing ===
Julia Golding is contributing to Mystery & Mayhem by Egmont Books, published in May 2016 along with 11 other authors including Katherine Woodfine, Clementine Beauvais, Elen Caldecott, Susie Day, Frances Hardinge, Caroline Lawrence, Helen Moss, Sally Nicholls, Kate Pankhurst, Robin Stevens and Harriet Whitehorn.

== Awards and nominations ==
- 2006 - The Diamond of Drury Lane won the Waterstones Children's Book Prize
- 2006 - The Diamond of Drury Lane won the Nestlé Smarties Book Prize in the 9–11 years old category
- 2006 - The Diamond of Drury Lane was shortlisted for the Costa Book Awards
- 2008 - Secrets of the Sirens won the Green Earth Book Award (Honour book)
