= Den of Thieves (novel) =

- First edition
- Author: Julia Golding
- Series: Cat Royal
- Genre: Young Adult fiction
- Publisher: Egmont UK Ltd.
- Publication date: 2007
- Pages: 432
- ISBN: 1-59643-444-9
- Preceded by: Cat Among the Pigeons
- Followed by: Cat O'Nine Tails

Den of Thieves is the third book in the Cat Royal series by Julia Golding. In this story the protagonist, Cat, becomes homeless, travels to Paris, dances with an old French man and becomes a spy.

== Plot ==
In this third installment, Mr Sheridan, the theater owner decides that Drury Lane is in need of a refurbishing so he intends to close it down for a few years. Because of this, many of the servants and actors have to leave and find work elsewhere, including Cat. Later on, Cat meets Syd on her way to visit Frank and Lizzie, and he stops her for a chat. Syd reveals he is going to leave London on a boxing tour for a few months, which horrifies Cat.

When she gets back Pedro tells her that when theatre closes he is going on tour around France with the Signor, and asks her where she'll be staying and Cat is too proud to ask anyone for help so she says she has a place to go to but doesn't specify a particular place.

Then a messenger tells Cat that Billy Shepherd wants to see her and, remembering she is in debt to him from Cat Among the Pigeons, she agrees to go. When she arrives she notices Billy has become considerably richer, as he has a vast jewel collection, a large gentleman's house with good-quality furniture and expensive clothes. Billy says to her that he wants her to get him the crown jewels and then she will no longer owe him anything. Cat doesn't want to agree, but he doesn't let her leave until she does, so she has no choice.

In the evening Syd is going on a night out with his gang and Cat wants to go too, but Syd says no. This results in an argument on why he doesn't let her in the gang and Syd doesn't give a specific answer until Cat asks if he has a girlfriend waiting for him and he doesn't want to present himself with her, at which point he expresses his feelings in a kiss on the lips before hurrying away.

At this point the theatre has closed. Cat notices she isn't on the list of people who will continue to work for the theatre when it is reopened, meaning she is no longer legally able to stay with the theatre group. Due to this she is left in the streets and in desperation to sell her manuscripts and make some money she falls prey to a book selling fraud called Mr Tweadle. In his home she is treated like a slave while he puts her stories in a magazine and gives the reputation of a reckless young moll. Later she is rescued by Frank and Mr Sheridan.

To find out the effects the French Revolution had on its people, Mr Sheridan decides to send her to Paris to work as a spy, as he thinks she's perfect for the job. So Cat travels to Paris under the pretense of a girl learning ballet, and hates it. She gets sea-sick and is bullied by her fellow ballerinas who do their best to make her experience with them a misery.

She and Frank are soon tangled up in a revolt, and sentenced to be hung but are rescued by a strange French boy. It isn't long before they find themselves kneeling before Jean-Francois (J-F) Thiland, the king of the Parisian thieves. They manage to escape, with J-F having befriended them and promised to protect them.

The two survive many more struggles - the Avon family being arrested, Cat being kidnapped by J-F's lifelong enemy and several little problems in between. But Frank and his family have their dignity restored, thanks to the duchess' fantastic opera singing.

And with the help of a drunken sea captain, Monsieur Bonaventure, sails set for England and all ends well.

== Reception ==
Kirkus Reviews claimed that reading Den of Thieves "requires some stamina, featuring as it does even more activity, even more spirited friends and villainous-if-complex enemies and even more exotic terrain". Further, compared to earlier books in the series, they found that "the joys of performance and the shifting fortunes of political rebellion are laid out as lessons with a heavier hand than before, although Cat's confusion about her attraction to the many young men in her life rings achingly true".

Booklist's Stephanie Zvirin referred to the novel's protagonist as a "fiery-tempered redhead, always in trouble, who charms commoners and gentry alike".
