= List of Henderson's Boys characters =

This is a list of characters from Robert Muchamore's Henderson's Boys series of books.

== Children ==
=== Group A ===
- Marc Kilgour: Found at a train station, abandoned by his mother, Marc spent the first 12 years of his life in an orphanage. The protagonist, Marc has a gift for languages and knows both French and German. He features in all of the books.
- Paul Clarke: A shy boy, his mother died when he was very young and his father died during an air raid. He spends a lot of his time reading and painting. He also designed the CHERUB insignia.
- Rosie Clarke (1927 - 5 June 1944): Paul's sister, she was born in England and feels that it is her 'proper' home. Rosie is currently the only female allowed to enter CHERUB's training program. She dies in Scorched Earth when she is shot in the base of the nose by Milice Commander Robert.
- PT Bivott: Born and raised in New York, his older brother and father died during a criminal operation that went wrong. He tried to run away during Eagle Day but was stopped by Paul. He eventually becomes CHERUB's gym master. His real name is Philippe Tomás "P. T." Bivott.
- Luc: A thirteen-year-old who likes to show his power and bully younger recruits. He first appears in Secret Army.
- Joel: A fourteen-year-old, Joel is long-limbed and muscular with scruffy blonde hair. He first appears in Secret Army.

=== Group B ===
- Troy LeConte: Troy first appears in Secret Army in an English approved school. He is bullied because of his French accent and is subsequently rescued by Eileen McAfferty.
- Sam: Joel's brother is ten years old and is one of Troy's friends.
- Yves: At fourteen years of age, Yves is one of the oldest in Group B.
- Three more boys are in these unit. One being there before Troy arrived, the other two mentioned in chapter 14 as expected to arrive and at the end of the book the whole unit is operational (has to have six members so as to be operational) and has been training.

=== Sisters and Juniors ===
- Mason LeConte: The brother of Troy, Mason is several years younger. He appeared with his brother for the first time in Secret Army. He would also appear in the final CHERUB novel New Guard.

== Staff ==
- Charles Henderson: After being assisted by the children during an operation in France, he is convinced that there should be a unit consisting entirely of children. He is in a troubled marriage and considered a divorce. In 1946 he was murdered by his wife Joan for reasons unknown.
- Eileen McAfferty: Henderson's commanding officer, she found herself conscripted into the navy as an officer. Later becomes Chairwoman of CHERUB and adopts Henderson's son Terrence, who is known as the Chairman of CHERUB Dr Terrence "Mac" McAfferty in the CHERUB series.
- Mr. Takada: Takada is the first CHERUB training instructor. He speaks very little English and no French, which is most of the recruit's native language. Takada first appears in Secret Army. He is the father of Miss Takada, one of the Martial Arts teachers in the CHERUB series.
- Pippa: CHERUB campus's elderly cook, first appearing in Secret Army.
- Mrs. Donelley: Teaches English and Maths to all students. She first appears in Secret Army.
- Boo: A 19-year-old radio-operator, first appearing in Grey Wolves. She had joined the Royal Navy directly from a posh finishing school. Her real name is Elizabeth DeVere, but she is known as Boo.
- Joyce Slater: Joyce was a Cambridge maths graduate who was regarded as one of the best code breakers and intelligence analysts in the country.
