= P. T. Bivott =

Fictional character from the Henderson's Boys Series by Robert Muchamore

- 'Henderson's Boys' character
- First appearance: The Escape
- Last appearance: Scorched Earth
- Created by: Robert Muchamore

In-universe information
- Occupation: CHERUB Agent
- Family: Father (deceased); Mother (deceased); Three brothers (two deceased, one missing)
- Nationality: American

Philippe Tomás "P. T." Bivott is an American-born boy from the Henderson's Boys book series by Robert Muchamore. In the events of Eagle Day, he was fifteen years old. He first appears at the end of The Escape. Bivott emigrated to France after stealing a lot of money. It is also revealed in Maximum Security that Bivott became CHERUB's gym master. There is a plaque in the oldest of CHERUB's gyms saying:

"Any boy bringing in mud or dirt on his plimsolls will be thrashed. P.T. Bivott (Sports Master)"

== Background and early life ==
Bivott's father tried to rob a bank in Chicago. The job succeeded but resulted in the death one of Bivott's brothers and their father. Bivott fled to France with a sack of twenty dollar bills.

== Physical appearance ==
Described as handsome by Rosie. Tall and gangly with long dark hair which is usually greased back. It is assumed that he must be physically fit because he later becomes CHERUB's sports master.

== Personality ==
Bivott has been described as calm. He likes to stay away from danger if possible. He may not be loyal to many people. He also has a shady side and can cheat his way out of a card game, and is a good and experienced thief.

== Appearances ==
=== The Escape ===
Bivott only appears briefly at the end of the book, saving Rosie after their boat was hit by a U-Boat.

=== Eagle Day ===
Bivott plays a more major role in Eagle Day. After meeting with Charles Henderson and the children, he decided to join them, under the pretense that they were running away to Spain. After he discovered that they were, in fact, trying to undermine the Nazi plot to invade Great Britain he attempted to run away but was stopped by Paul. After some indecision Charles Henderson decided not to kill him. At the end of the book he sailed to England with the rest of the group.

=== Secret Army ===
Bivott is a member of Group A of Henderson's Boys. He goes to North Scotland with the rest of Group A to take part in parachute training. It is also revealed that he is now Rosie Clarke's boyfriend.

=== Grey Wolves ===
Bivott goes undercover with Group A (except Luc) and Troy to Nazi occupied France. He supports himself by using short con tricks. After a while he is stabbed by a man he conned before and is shipped back to Great Britain where Luc replaces him. Rosie Clark dumps him because he tried to sleep with her when she said no.
