= Acland Burghley School =

Acland Burghley Secondary School
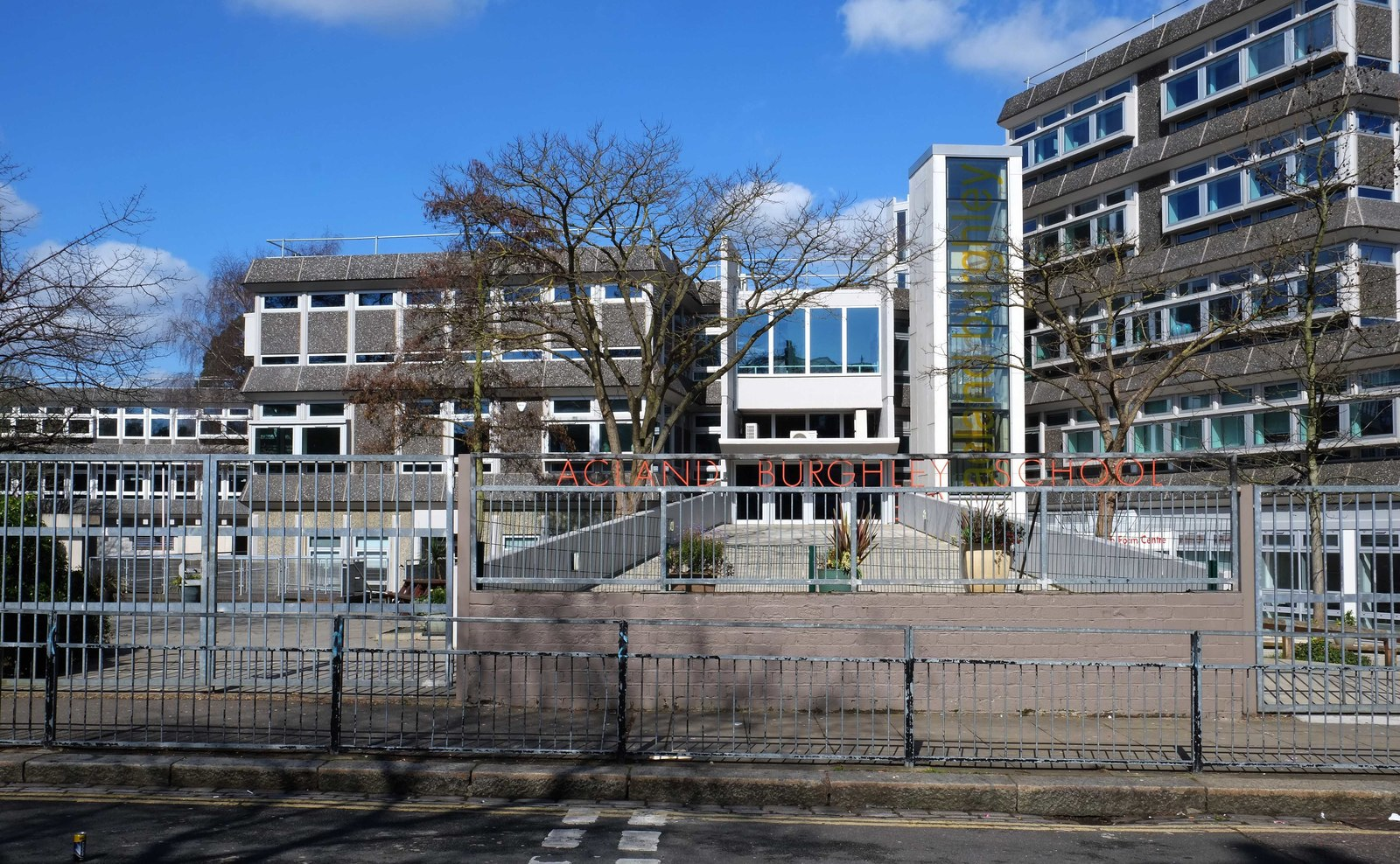

Location
- Burghley Road; Tufnell Park, London, NW5 1UJ; England; 51.5574°N 0.140°W

Information
- Type: Community school
- Motto: "Creating excellence together"
- Local authority: Camden
- Department for Education URN: 100053 Tables
- Ofsted: Reports
- Gender: Coeducational
- Age: 11 to 18
- Houses: no
- Website: aclandburghley.camden.sch.uk

Acland Burghley School is a mixed comprehensive secondary school in the Tufnell Park area of the London Borough of Camden, in London, England. The school received specialist status as an Arts College in 2000 and is a part of the LaSWAP Sixth Form Consortium.

== History ==
Burghley Road School was opened in 1884 as a mixed elementary school, and in 1895 a building for senior pupils was added. In 1905 the new Acland School (named after Arthur Acland) was established on Fortess Road, near the station while taking the senior boys from Burghley Road. The senior girls moved to Chesters Road in 1931, leaving juniors (both boys and girls) at Burghley Road.

During World War II the schools remained open as "emergency" schools for children who had not been evacuated. In 1959 the schools were re-merged as a mixed, non-selective school, Acland Burghley School. New buildings were constructed in the 1960s.

== Recent quality assessments ==
The 2013 Ofsted report summarised the school as follows: ‘The school is larger than the average secondary school. Approximately two-fifths of students are White British. A significant proportion of students are from other White backgrounds, White and Black Caribbean and other Black backgrounds. Several other minority ethnic groups are represented in the school. An above average proportion of students are known to be eligible for the pupil premium, which provides additional funding for children in local authority care, students known to be eligible for free school meals and those from families in the armed forces. A similar proportion of students are entitled to the Year 7 catch-up premium. The proportion of students supported through school action is below average. The proportion of students supported through school action plus or with a statement of special educational needs is above average. The most common needs are behavioural, emotional and social difficulties and speech, language and communication needs. There are also students with physical disabilities. The school has specialist arts status and has gained the Arts Mark Gold Award.

The Good Schools Guide said that the school was "remarkable for its art and for the egalitarian effects of its anti-bullying and peer mentoring programme.' The school is above national average for the new Attainment 8 headline measure. The number of pupils achieving grade C or better in English and Maths is above the national average and the number of pupils attaining the English Baccalaureate is significantly above national average. The school has also twinned with Chianna Primary school from Ghana, and during the year donations are collected and sent to the school in Ghana, who are in need of basic educational supplies.

Previous headteacher Michael Shew hit out at a supply teacher for secretly filming pupils misbehaving in class. He confirmed that the school had featured on Channel 5’s hidden camera documentary Classroom Chaos after he was contacted by the Camden New Journal. The documentary, which received widespread media coverage, showed pupils misbehaving during a Media Studies class. Mr Shew argued that the programme’s makers used underhand tactics to film children without their permission and had opened up the possibility of legal action.

The current headteacher is Nicholas John. Former headteacher Jo Armitage was praised as having a significantly positive impact on the school in a 2010 Ofsted report . This was less positive in the 2013 inspection where the school was inspected and given notice to improve. A subsequent Ofsted monitoring report in September 2016 judged senior leaders and governors as "taking effective action to tackle the areas requiring improvement... in order to become a good school" and stated that "In a short space of time the new headteacher (Nicholas John) has been instrumental in delivering significant improvements." The most recent Ofsted report in March 2018 gave the school a 'Good' rating again and judged the effectiveness of leadership and management as 'Outstanding'.

== LaSWAP Sixth Form ==
The LaSWAP Sixth Form is the sixth form consortium of four north London schools: Acland Burghley School, La Sainte Union Catholic School, Parliament Hill School and William Ellis School. It is one of the largest sixth form consortia in the Greater London area offering some 42 different A level courses, AGCEs, BTECs, NVQs and GCSE courses. The name was formed from the first three letters of La Sainte Union and the first letter of the other three schools.

== Architecture ==
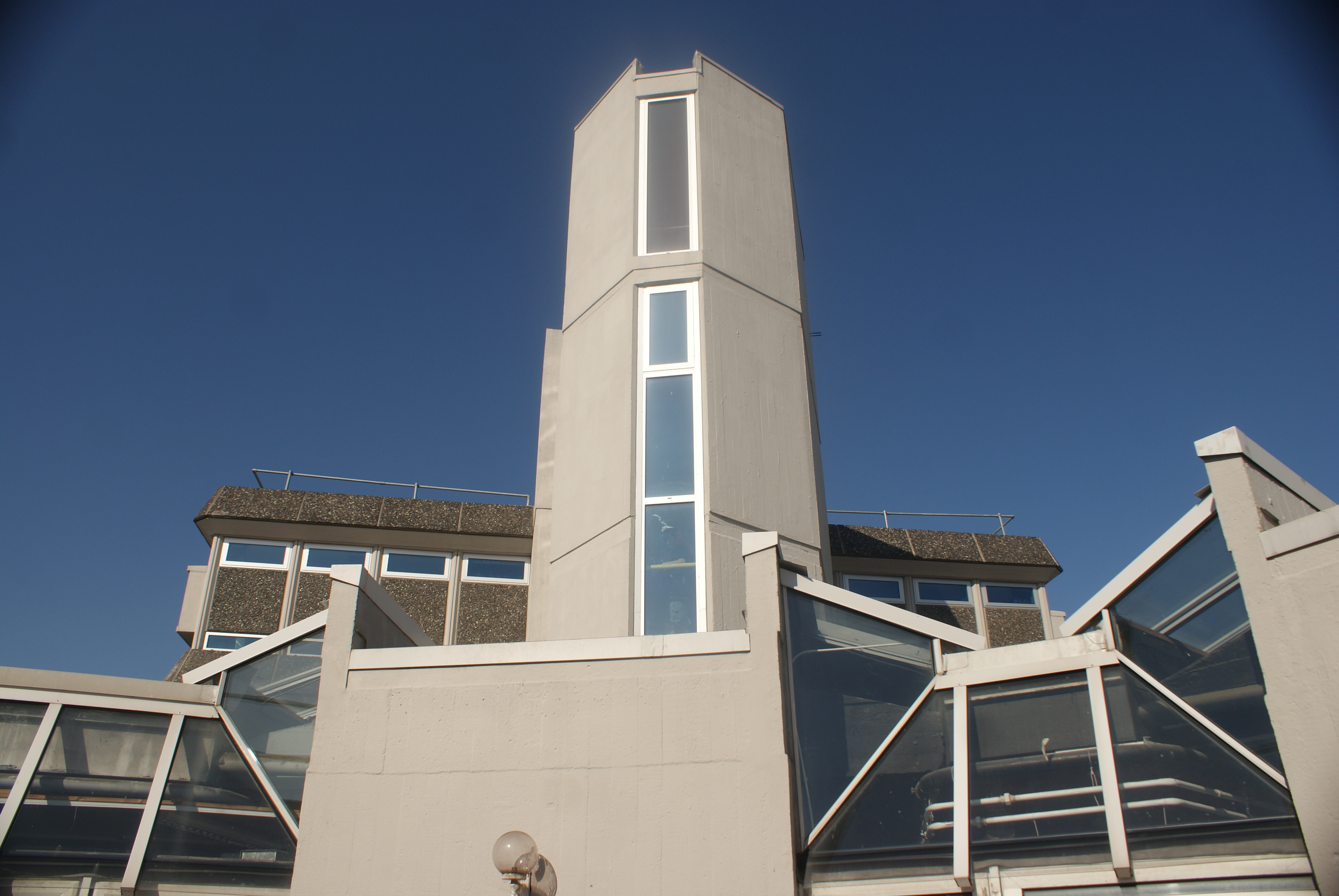
View of one of the stairwell towers

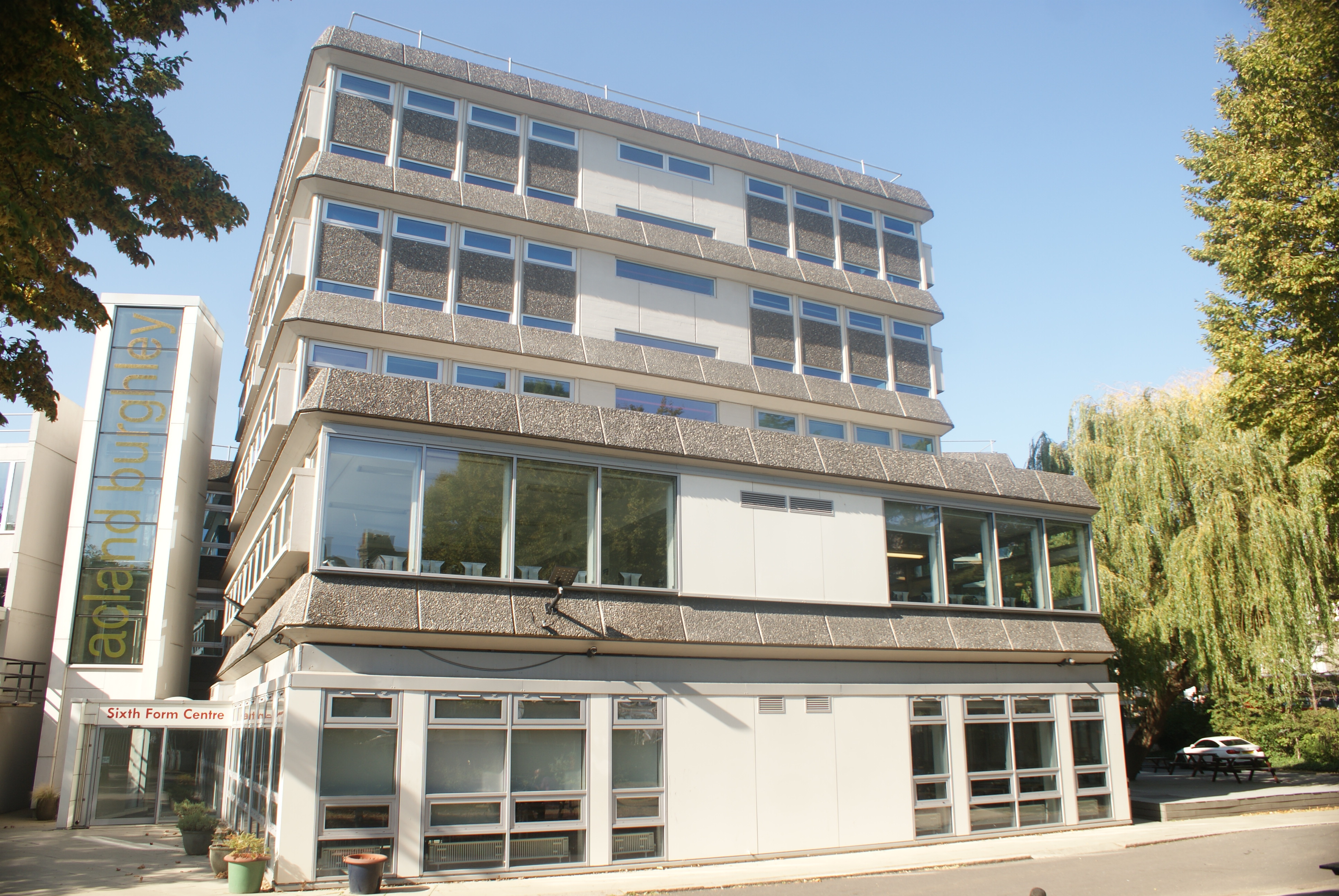
Sixth Form Centre

The school is notable for its brutalist architecture by firm Howell Killick Partridge and Amis, constructed between 1963 and 1967. It consists of a three storey central core with three five storey towers fanning out from the east side. A hexagonal assembly hall using timber and concrete is linked to the hall by a walkway. In 1979 the original gymnasium and games hall was destroyed in a fire.

Later additions include a replacement sports hall, a two storey music and dance centre, and a sixth form centre. The 1960s elements of the site were Grade II listed by Historic England in 2016.

In 2025 the National Lottery Heritage Fund awarded £1 million for restoration of the assembly hall and creation of the UK's first Museum of Brutalist Architecture.

== Notable former staff ==
June Fisher was a deputy and later acting head before she left to take up a headship and to be President of the NUT.

== Notable former pupils ==
- Akala, rapper, poet and journalist.
- Eddy Grant, Guyanese-British reggae musician.
- John Alford, actor who played "Robbie Wright" in the television drama series Grange Hill between 1985 and 1990.
- Kitty Daisy and Lewis, band
- Lee Thompson, musician, Madness
- Ms. Dynamite, Mercury Music Prize, two time BRIT Awards and three time MOBO Awards winning hip hop and R&B recording artist, rapper-songwriter, and record producer.
- Robert Muchamore, author of the CHERUB series of young adult novels.
- Sarah Brown, charity executive and wife of former Prime Minister Gordon Brown
- Shazad Latif, actor
- Tom Harper, director
- Luke Hollman, cricketer
- Lady Camden, drag artist and runner-up in RuPaul's Drag Race (season 14)
- Mae Muller, singer

== Depiction in fiction ==
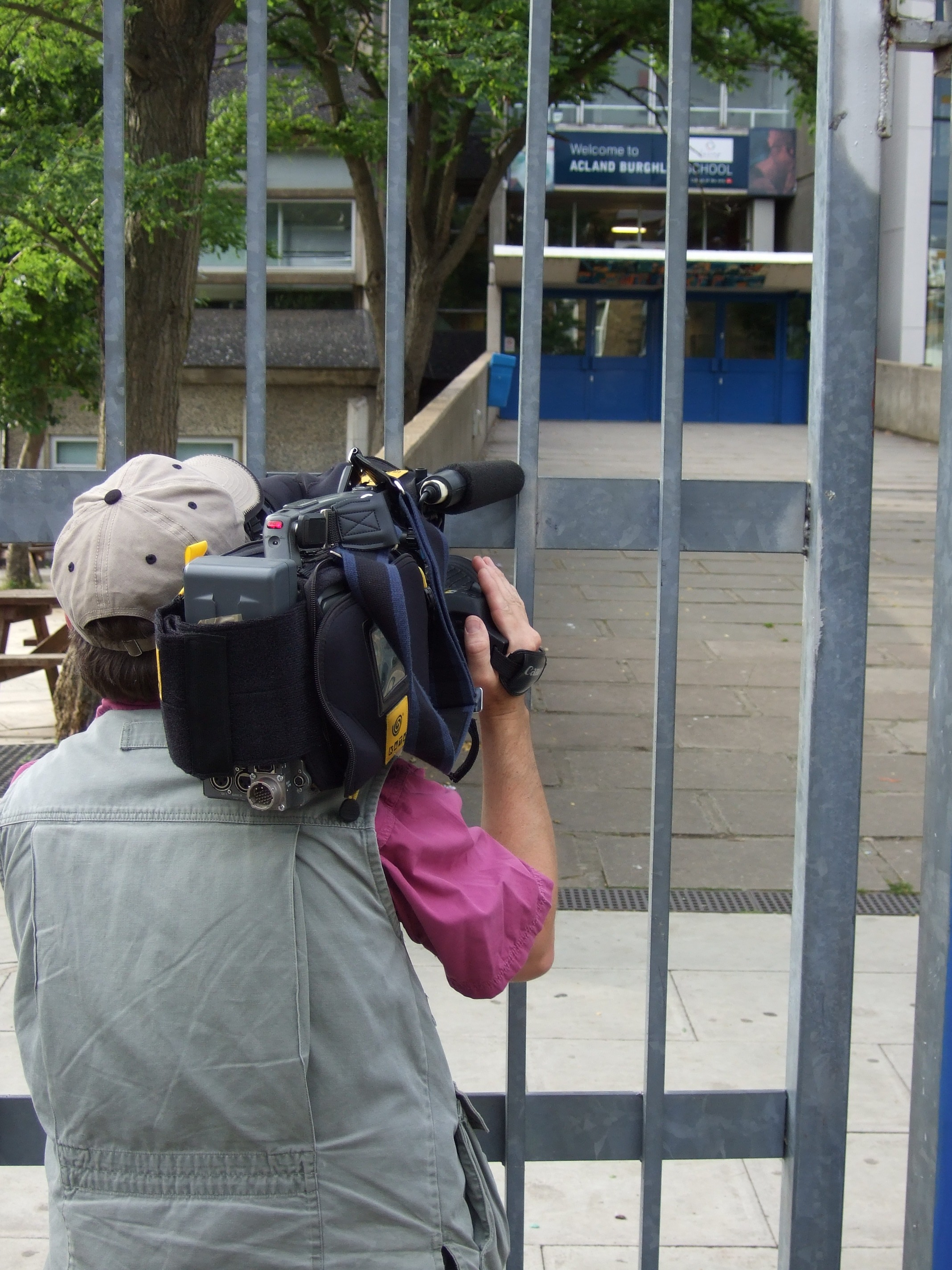
Filming outside of Acland Burghley School for the documentary for the DVD release of Chalk. This part of the school is seen on the show's opening titles.

The exterior of the school was used as the fictional Galfast High in Steven Moffat's 1997 sitcom Chalk. The exterior was used again in 'Supernova' a 2006 story in the BBC drama series Silent Witness.

In 2008, the school was featured on the first episode of the third series of the Channel 4 show Balls of Steel.

Acland Burghley is the setting for Eve's husband's school drinks party in series 2 episode 3 of Killing Eve, with both exterior and interior footage.

In literature, the school is revealed as Peter Grant's old school in Whispers Under Ground and to have a ghost haunting the railway tracks under its playground. The science lab in Robert Muchamore's first book in the Cherub series, The Recruit, was based on the Acland Burghley science labs.
