= Brigands M.C. =

CHERUB: Brigands MC
- Author: Robert Muchamore
- Language: English
- Series: CHERUB
- Genre: Children's, Thriller, Spy novel
- Publisher: Hodder and Stoughton
- Publication date: United Kingdom; 4 October 2008
- Publication place: United Kingdom
- Media type: Print (paperback)
- Pages: 406
- ISBN: 978-0-340-98903-6
- Preceded by: The General
- Followed by: Shadow Wave

Brigands M.C. is the eleventh novel in the CHERUB series by Robert Muchamore. It was released on 4 October 2008. A blue-cover edition of which only 8,499 copies were made was also produced. The special editions were only sold in W.H.Smith in the United Kingdom. Of developing the plot Robert Muchamore said:

"I also like to mix the books up, so while The General was very much a story about CHERUB agents and training, Brigands is totally focused on the story of a boy called Dante and a huge mission to infiltrate and bring down a dangerous biker gang".

== Plot ==
The book begins in 2003 with the death of Dante Scott's parents, older sister and brother at the hands of the Brigands M.C. South Devon President, Ralph "Führer" Donnington, after Dante's father refuses to go through with plans to redevelop the Brigands' clubhouse in a lucrative property development scheme. Dante manages to escape with his infant sister, is put under the wing of child psychologist Ross Johnson, and is questioned by police in an attempt to convict the Führer.

On the night of the brutal killing, Dante was forced into a boxing match with Martin, the Führer's eldest son, and got Martin's blood on his shirt; Dante had initially claimed that the blood was his, from a nosebleed. Johnson realises that the defence solicitors could use the unreliability of his statement to clear the Führer. Much to Dante's fury, the courts decide that there is insufficient evidence to convict the Führer; and he is subsequently released.

After moving in with a foster family, a Dutch Brigand attempts to murder Dante with a bomb inside the controller of a remote-controlled toy car on his birthday. Shaken, Dante moves in under the care of Ross again. Dante is drugged by Jennifer Mitchum (who had previously drugged and recruited James Adams in The Recruit) and is sent to CHERUB campus, where he befriends Lauren Onions (soon to become Lauren Adams) and is accepted into CHERUB.

Four and a half years later, undercover policeman Neil Gauche tries to infiltrate Brigands M.C., hoping to uncover evidence of the Brigands' arms smuggling activities. The Führer uncovers Gauche's identity and stages a mock execution, warning the police against further investigation. Ross and Neil reach out to CHERUB for their assistance and James, Lauren, and Dante are assigned to a mission to infiltrate the Brigands M.C. James convinces mission controller Chloe Blake to allow him to purchase a motorcycle to aid him in getting closer to the Brigands. James is invited on a run with the Brigands to the Rebel Tea Party, a motorcycle convention in Cambridge. On the run, the Brigands are attacked by rival gang the Vengeful Bastards and James saves the life of Brigand Dirty Dave when a member of the Vengefuls tries to stab him with a sharpened hammer. Meanwhile, Neil and assistant mission controller Jake McEwen attempt to uncover a weapons deal orchestrated by the Brigands by following Nigel Connor, a biker friend of James, and his friend Julian Hargreaves. However, after he and Nigel help the Brigands in smuggling arms into Britain, Julian gets scared and confesses to his father, who is a judge. The police, unaware of the CHERUB mission, move on the Brigands and their associates smuggling the weapons and thwart the surveillance operation.

With the weapons deal blown and the CHERUB mission turning up few leads, the agents are sent back to campus. Before Dante leaves, he sneaks into the Führer's house, intent on killing him, but can't bring himself to do it and instead carves a message into the Führer's table that implies he is a member of the Vengeful Bastards. James and Kerry start dating again.

== Character developments ==
James and Kerry kiss shortly before James leaves on his mission, but decide to wait until James returns before resuming their relationship. Although while on the mission James dates a girl and sleeps with another, he tells Kerry he was faithful to her and they begin dating at the end of the book.

Lauren and Rat argue about Lauren 'flirting' with Dante after his return to campus. While on the mission, Lauren is supposed to be dating Joe Donnington, but at one point she gets drunk and kisses Dante (despite their aliases in for the mission being twins). However, when she returns to campus she resumes her relationship with Rat.
