= Mad Dogs (novel) =

2007 novel by Robert Muchamore

- First edition cover
- Author: Robert Muchamore
- Language: English
- Series: CHERUB
- Genre: Children's, Thriller, Spy novel, Realistic, Young Adult
- Publisher: Hodder and Stoughton
- Publication date: 1 October 2007
- Publication place: United Kingdom
- Media type: Print (paperback)
- Pages: 389 pp
- ISBN: 0-340-91171-9 (first edition, paperback)
- OCLC: 153554768
- Preceded by: The Fall
- Followed by: The Sleepwalker

Mad Dogs is the eighth novel in the CHERUB series by Robert Muchamore. In the novel, CHERUB agents infiltrate a violent street gang.

== Plot ==
Following the collapse of KMG (Keith Moore's Gang) at the end of Class A, rival drug gangs the Mad Dogs and the Slasher Boys engage in a violent turf war for control of the Luton underworld. Cherubs Gabrielle O'Brien and Michael Hendry are sent to infiltrate the Slasher Boys. While carrying out a drug delivery for DeShawn "Major Dee" Andrews, the leader of the Slasher Boys, Gabrielle's contact is killed by members of rival gang the Runts and Gabrielle is grievously wounded after being stabbed by a Runt.

Meanwhile, James Adams and his new girlfriend Dana Smith are helping on the last few days of basic training as instructors. While there, Ukrainian instructor Yosyp Kazakov is accidentally knocked out when trainee Kevin Sumner throws a smoke canister at him. The seven trainees, realising it will be hours before Dana returns with head instructor George Pike, overpower and bind James. When Dana and Pike return they free James. Pike is unable to fail all the trainees, so they decide to punish Kevin and his friend Ronan Welsh by ordering them to stand to attention holding rifles until dawn. James feels guilty about the severity of the punishment, but Kazakov tells him that "a soldier is only as tough as the person who trains them".

Disgraced instructor Norman Large tries to blackmail Lauren, threatening to kill CHERUB chairwoman Zara Asker's beagle Meatball unless Lauren testifies to the CHERUB disciplinary committee that he was not drunk when he suffered a heart attack on a training exercise in the previous book. Kyle, James, Kerry, Lauren and Bruce decide to get revenge by setting up James with Large's adopted daughter Hayley and taking pictures of the two making out. When Large discovers their ploy he attempts to kill Meatball and almost strangles Kyle to death before being knocked out by Lauren. Large is sacked by Zara, who also expels Kyle as she rationalizes that, as he is on the brink of retirement, he will simply quit CHERUB to avoid punishment. Due to Lauren's extended record of misbehavior, she is suspended from missions for three months, and forced to volunteer helping the red-shirts. Kyle decides to go on a gap year before studying law at Cambridge, but not before James and the other cherubs throw him a leaving party.

Gabrielle barely survives her injury and reports that the Runts were tipped off to the drug deal by Sasha Thompson, the leader of the Mad Dogs. James and Bruce are sent to infiltrate the Mad Dogs, using James' past relationship with Keith Moore's son and Mad Dog associate Junior Moore. The two are soon accepted into the gang and ingratiate themselves to Sasha by assisting in robbing a drug deal set up by the Slasher Boys. However, James' rapid ascent annoys Junior, who Sasha is trying to protect from criminal activity. Junior tries to persuade James to join him in the robbery of a travel agent, but James declines and is convinced by Bruce to turn Junior in. Junior unsuccessfully robs the travel agent and is arrested moments after leaving.

James and Bruce infiltrate Sasha's house to search for evidence under the ruse of treating a soccer injury. James is seduced by Sasha's daughter Lois, who takes his virginity, but regrets cheating on Dana. Bruce discovers that Sasha is in contact with Major Dee's accountant Simeon Bentine, whom the cherubs realise is informing Sasha about the Slasher Boys' drug deals so that Sasha can rob them. Mission controllers John Jones and Chloe Blake coerce Bentine into helping them set up a sting operation to arrest both Sasha and Major Dee while the latter makes a routine cocaine pickup. However, Sasha is tipped off about the sting operation and plans to instead rob an airplane carrying US currency while the police are distracted by the sting operation. The Runts are in turn tipped off by Sasha about Major Dee's pickup. Michael escapes the resulting shoot-out; while fleeing, he encounters the Runt who had stabbed Gabrielle but cannot bring himself to kill him. Michael is arrested, as is James after Sasha's escape goes awry. Bruce escapes and manages to preserve a truck used in the airport robbery filled with forensic evidence. However, Bentine swaps Major Dee's cocaine out for talcum powder, allowing the Slasher Boys and Runts to escape prosecution for drug charges. With the rival gang members also unlikely to face prosecution for the shootout, the mission ends and the cherubs return to campus. James confesses his infidelity to Dana, who is hurt but decides not to dump him, so long as he has an STD test first.

In the epilogue, Sasha and most of the Mad Dogs are incarcerated, as is Junior Moore. Major Dee escalates the war between the Slasher Boys and the Runts, but is ultimately forced to flee the country after several of his associates are arrested in connection to the death of several Runts. Bentine also flees the country, but is found and killed by Major Dee's associates. Large begins working as a security guard, after being unable to train as a prison officer due to his heart condition. Gabrielle continues to recover from her wounds, Bruce is awarded the black shirt for his performance, and James' test results come back negative.

== Reception ==
On behalf of The Guardian, Ninja called Mad Dogs "a fantastic book full of twists and turns".
