= Divine Madness (novel) =

2006 novel by Robert Muchamore

- First edition cover
- Author: Robert Muchamore
- Language: English
- Series: CHERUB
- Genre: Children's, Thriller, Spy novel
- Publisher: Hodder and Stoughton
- Publication date: 6 April 2006
- Publication place: United Kingdom
- Media type: Print (paperback)
- Pages: 368 pp (first edition, paperback)
- ISBN: 0-340-89434-2 (first edition, paperback)
- OCLC: 62796249
- Dewey Decimal: 823.92 22
- LC Class: PZ7.M869647 Di 2006
- Preceded by: The Killing
- Followed by: Man vs Beast

Divine Madness is the fifth novel in the CHERUB series by Robert Muchamore. In this novel, CHERUB agents James, Lauren, and Dana go to Australia to investigate a religious cult called the Survivors.

== Plot ==
Kerry Chang, Bruce Norris and Kyle Blueman are on a mission in Hong Kong to befriend Clyde Xu, a teenage environmentalist who has been recruited by Help Earth to assassinate an oil executive. After Clyde meets with Help Earth operative Barry Cox, Bruce follows Barry back to his hotel room and incapacitates him before stealing his documents, while Kerry thwarts the assassination attempt by swapping out the explosives Cox had given Clyde. An MI5 investigation into Cox's activities uncovers that Help Earth are being funded by wealthy Australian cult The Survivors, who are in turn profiting from terrorist attacks committed by Help Earth. James and Lauren Adams and Dana Smith are sent on a mission to infiltrate The Survivors, with the aim of infiltrating the higher echelons of the cult and discovering the extent of their connection with Help Earth. Before James leaves, he and Kerry agree to give their relationship another try when he returns.

The cherubs go undercover in Australia and are soon recruited by the cult. James and Lauren are sent to the Survivor's elite boarding school in the Ark, the Survivors' isolated Outback headquarters. Meanwhile, Dana and another young Survivor, Eve Stannis, are recruited to aid Barry and his fellow Help Earth operative Nina Richards in a terrorist attack on a LNG terminal. Dana manages to alert mission controller John Jones of the target. However, Barry kills the ASIS agents following them and reveals that the facility to be attacked is not in Australia as originally assumed, but instead in Indonesia.

In the Ark, James befriends Rathbone "Rat" Regan, the cynical son of Survivors founder Joel Regan who sees through the cult's brainwashing techniques. Rat introduces James to Joel's wife Susie, who Lauren discovers is embezzling from the Survivors to bankroll Help Earth; Rat also reveals that Susie is having an affair with Brian "Bungle" Evans, a Help Earth operative whom James had previously encountered. With Help Earth's attack imminent, the Australian military prepares to storm the Ark, and James and Lauren attempt to retrieve Susie's data before the assault. They are followed by Rat and are forced to reveal CHERUB's existence to him. They enter Joel's quarters to find that Susie has killed him, destroyed her data and fled the Ark, and the Ark is put into lockdown before the trio can escape. The raid begins, but the military are forced to fall back after one of their helicopters is shot down by the Survivors. James, Lauren and Rat are caught trying to escape and locked in a room with several young children. When the order comes for the Survivors to fall back into the Ark's fortified church, Rat suggests escaping through a sewage tank. Lauren refuses to leave without taking the children with them, and the group manages to escape the Ark before it is destroyed when explosives laid by the Survivors are accidentally detonated. Meanwhile, with no backup coming and no way of warning mission control, Dana incapacitates Barry and Nina herself while their boat sails across the Arafura Sea, but is too late to stop Eve leaving in their dinghy in an attempt to complete the attack herself; Eve ultimately drowns at sea. Susie and Brian are apprehended before they can leave Australia.

The cherubs visit former CHERUB Amy Collins to recuperate. Rat is accepted into CHERUB, Dana is awarded her navy shirt, while, to James' disbelief, Lauren is awarded her black shirt for saving the children from the Ark.

== Development ==
=== Censored section ===
Divine Madness is one of two CHERUB stories where part of a scene had been cut out. The scene in question was the segment where Kyle and Bruce were chasing a suspected member of Help Earth. In the original version of the scene, Bruce beats up a passenger who calls him names while boarding the train. In the published book, this is not shown due to excessive violence. The cover is Bruce ignoring the comment.

=== Extra story ===
On the CHERUB website, there is a bonus chapter entitled "Disconnected". It is set during Chapter 44 of Divine Madness, and introduces James' father.

== Awards ==
Divine Madness won the Lancashire Children's Book of the Year in 2007.
