= Paul Clarke (character) =

Fictional character from the Henderson's Boys Series by Robert Muchamore

- Henderson's Boys character
- First appearance: The Escape

In-universe information
- Occupation: CHERUB Agent
- Family: Rosie Clarke (sister; deceased), Digby Clarke (father; deceased), mother (deceased)
- Nationality: British

Paul Clarke is a fictional character from the Henderson's Boys series by Robert Muchamore. His mother died before the Second World War and his father died whilst carrying valuable radio blueprints for the British Secret Service.

== Background and early life ==
Paul Clarke's mother died from cancer shortly before the Second World War, leaving him in the care of his father, a wireless salesman.

== Physical appearance ==
Paul is described by his sister as 'weedy'. He doesn't enjoy sport and finds the physical training of CHERUB hard.

== Personality ==
Paul enjoys his own company and spends all of his personal time reading and drawing. His area of the dormitory is adorned by copies of some of Picasso's paintings.

== Academia ==
Paul is an introvert and enjoys being on his own. He spends a lot of his time drawing and reading, and drew for a German officer in Eagle Day.

== Appearances ==
=== The Escape ===
In The Escape, Paul and his sister Rosie are being hunted by German agents because their father, who died in an air-raid, was working for the British Secret Service and had valuable radio blueprints that the English needed to operate their radios. British spy Charles Henderson reaches them first with the help of Marc Kilgour.

=== Eagle Day ===
In Eagle Day, Paul starts the journey to England on a boat with his sister. When the boat sinks they become separated. Luckily he is picked by an ex-doctor, who heals his wounds. Subsequently, he, PT Bivott and his sister assist Charles Henderson in foiling the Nazis' plot to invade Britain.

=== Secret Army ===
Paul is the first CHERUB to appear in Secret Army. He introduces the LeConte brothers to the rest of Group A. He has not taken part in training for several days due to an ankle injury. This is then proved to be a gimmick by Mr. Takada who makes Luc his training partner. Luc bullies Paul relentlessly but is eventually beaten up by Paul's friends.

During parachute training in Northern Scotland, Paul breaks his leg and subsequently drops out of the course and, in turn, the final exercise. On his return to CHERUB Campus, Charles Henderson reveals that he has killed all of his wife's pet spiders which Paul fed on occasion. He then asks Paul to design the CHERUB logo.
