= Man vs Beast =

2006 novel by Robert Muchamore

- Author: Robert Muchamore
- Language: English
- Series: CHERUB
- Genre: Thriller, Spy novel
- Publisher: Hodder and Stoughton
- Publication date: 19 October 2006
- Publication place: United Kingdom
- Media type: Print (paperback)
- Pages: 320 pp (first edition, paperback)
- ISBN: 0-340-91169-7 (first edition, paperback)
- OCLC: 70173265
- Dewey Decimal: 823.92 22
- LC Class: PZ7.M869647 Ma 2006
- Preceded by: Divine Madness
- Followed by: The Fall

Man vs Beast is the sixth novel of the CHERUB series by Robert Muchamore.

== Plot ==
Lauren and Bethany plot to sneak into the basic training compound to provide care packages to the trainees, including Rat and Bethany's brother Jake. Lauren blackmails James into aiding them by threatening to reveal to Kerry that he had cheated on her during their mission in Idaho. The trio successfully make it into the compound and give their packages to the trainees, but are caught on a backup CCTV system. James is left off with a warning after Lauren's blackmail is exposed, but Lauren and Bethany are harshly punished.

Several weeks later, James, Lauren, Kyle and Zara are sent on a mission to bring down the Animal Freedom Militia (AFM), an animal liberation terrorist group. They stay with peaceful animal rights activist Ryan Quinn, who uses his links with animal rights groups to aid the cherubs. James and Kyle befriend Tom and Viv Carter, two hardline animal rights activists who are dissatisfied with peaceful protest; Kyle begins dating Tom. Meanwhile, Lauren joins Quinn in rescuing and rehoming beagle puppies from a kennel that sells dogs for experimentation. One puppy evades the activists and is only found after the others are rehomed, so Lauren brings him back to Quinn's house and names him Meatball.

Viv makes contact with Rhiannon "Jo" Jules, a wealthy animal rights activist who leads AFM off-shoot the Animal Freedom Army (AFA). James, Kyle and Tom are invited to participate in an AFA assault on a medical research company by committing an arson attack on a courier depot that makes deliveries to the company. The attack goes successfully and James, Kyle, Viv and Tom are recruited to participate in the AFA's kidnapping of celebrity chef Nick Cobb. Members of the AFA livestream themselves forcefeeding Cobb sink cleaner, intended as retribution for Cobb's legal team having had rabbits forcefed the same sink cleaner as evidence in a lawsuit. James escapes from an AFA safehouse, tells the authorities where Cobb is being held, and returns to CHERUB campus. Kyle, who is present at Cobb's torture, forces the activists at gunpoint to put Cobb onto a van that he drives to hospital. Jo, Tom, Viv and the other AFA members are subsequently arrested while trying to flee their base of operations.

With the mission over, Zara and Lauren bid farewell to Quinn. Lauren, swayed by Quinn, becomes vegetarian. As Lauren is not allowed a pet as an active CHERUB agent, Zara and Ewart Asker adopt Meatball. Two days later, James, Lauren, Kerry, and Bethany board a flight about to depart to the CHERUB summer hostel in the Mediterranean, joined by Rat and Jake, who passed basic training. When Zara boards the plane she is greeted warmly by the cherubs: it is revealed that she has been appointed chairwoman of CHERUB.

In the epilogue, Jo is sentenced to 18 years in prison, Viv to 12, and Tom to 4. Multiple other AFA and AFM members are also incarcerated, and the AFM disbands. Quinn forms a new animal rights organisation dedicated to non-violent action against animal rights offenders. Cobb survives his ordeal, albeit with irreversible damage to his digestive system. Mac retires as CHERUB chairman.
