= Lone Wolf (Muchamore novel) =

2014 novel by Robert Muchamore

- Author: Robert Muchamore
- Language: English
- Series: CHERUB
- Genre: Children's, Thriller, Spy novel
- Publisher: Hodder & Stoughton
- Publication date: (United Kingdom) United Kingdom; 1 August 2014
- Publication place: United Kingdom
- Media type: Print
- Pages: 352
- ISBN: 978-1-4449-1409-2
- Preceded by: Black Friday
- Followed by: New Guard

Lone Wolf is the sixteenth and penultimate novel in the CHERUB series by Robert Muchamore, and the fourth book of the Aramov series. It was released on 1 August 2014.

== Plot ==
In 2012, teenager Fay Hoyt and her aunt Kirsten steal money and cocaine from Hagar, a drug dealer who killed Fay's mother. They are arrested trying to sell the cocaine in Manchester. Kirsten is sent to prison, where she is killed by Hagar's enforcers, while Fay is sent to a juvenile detention facility. Eighteen months later, CHERUB agents Ryan Sharma and Fu Ning are recruited to take down Hagar's gang, working under mission controller James Adams. Ryan is given the job of befriending people close to the gang, and attempting to make himself known in order to pick up information for the intelligence services, while Ning is given the job of befriending Fay. The girls immediately grow close, but Ryan struggles to make friends until a scheme devised by James makes him popular.

Ning and Fay begin an assault on Hagar's supplies of drugs, first by stealing cocaine from Hagar's stash house and selling it to Eli, a rival of Hagar's. The duo also recruit Warren, a drug runner for Hagar, to act as an informant. Fay later begins dating Warren. Warren helps the girls find a grow house where Hagar is growing marijuana. The girls raid and trash the grow house. When Eli declines to buy the marijuana from them, Fay goes behind Ning's back, sets a van full of the marijuana on fire and drives it into his garage, hoping to trick Hagar into thinking Eli was responsible. Hagar initially takes the bait and retaliates against several of Eli's fronts, but realises that Fay was responsible and puts a bounty on her head. Eli's lieutenants track down Fay and Ning; Ning is taken prisoner before being rescued by James and the police, but Fay manages to escape. Meanwhile, Ryan begins working for Hagar's crew. One of his jobs involves disposing of insulation that Hagar's suppliers had used to smuggle cocaine into Britain. Ryan investigates the businesses used as fronts by Hagar for the operation, and discovers that the various businesses are owned by the Crewdson family, deducing that the Crewdsons use the businesses to smuggle drugs throughout Britain.

Several months later, Ning, Ryan, James and James' fiance Kerry Chang watch a preview of a BBC Panorama programme that exposes the Crewdson family for supplying multiple drug gangs in Britain. Hagar goes into hiding, but is tracked down and killed by Fay, who flees with Warren.
