= People's Republic (novel) =

Book

- Author: Robert Muchamore
- Language: English
- Series: CHERUB
- Genre: Children's, Thriller, Spy novel
- Publisher: Hodder and Stoughton
- Publication date: United Kingdom: August 4, 2011
- Publication place: United Kingdom
- Media type: Print (hardback)
- Pages: 416
- ISBN: 978-0-340-99919-6
- Preceded by: Shadow Wave
- Followed by: Guardian Angel

People's Republic is the thirteenth novel in the CHERUB series by Robert Muchamore. It was published by Hodder Children's Books (ISBN 9780340999196) on 4 August 2011, and shows the beginning of the Aramov series. This carries on from the series featuring long-standing central character James Adams. The series has a new central character called Ryan Sharma. Ryan is twelve years old and is just about to be sent on his first big mission to Kyrgyzstan.

== Plot summary ==
CHERUB agent Ryan Sharma is given his first mission. Paired with ex-CHERUB Amy Collins and American Ted Brasker, both agents of international anti-smuggling taskforce Transnational Facilitator Unit (TFU), Ryan is tasked to befriend Californian Ethan Kitsell. Kitsell's mother Gillian is actually Galenka Aramov, a member of the Aramov Clan, a major smuggling group based out of Kyrgyzstan. Ryan wins Ethan's trust, but Gillian's home is raided by unknown assassins who kill Gillian and Ethan's friend Yannis, mistaking him for Ethan. Ethan reveals to Ryan that terminally ill clan matriarch Irena Aramov requested that Gillian share leadership of the clan with Gillian's sister Leonid after her death; Leonid is presumed to have sent the assassins to eliminate Gillian and Ethan as rivals. To Ryan's disgust, TFU head Denise "Dr D" Huggan plans to have Ethan tracked, rather than intervene to stop the clan from bringing him to Kyrgyzstan. Ryan lashes out at Dr D and is sent back to CHERUB campus to be punished. Ethan manages to obtain a mobile phone and keeps in contact with Ryan.

Meanwhile, 11-year-old Fu Ning is forced to flee China with her British stepmother Ingrid after her stepfather Chaoxiang is arrested for his role in a human smuggling organisation. The two manage to enter Kyrgyzstan on an Aramov plane, but are taken captive by Leonid, who plans to torture Ingrid into handing over details of bank accounts Chaoxiang had registered in her name. Leonid kills Ingrid after getting the information he needs out of her, but Ning manages to escape with the aid of Dan, a sympathetic Aramov enforcer. Dan arranges for Ning to be smuggled to England via the Czech Republic, with Ning hoping to obtain British citizenship through her adoption by Ingrid, a British national. On arrival in England, however, Ning is forced to work in a warehouse supplying food for a bakery. Ning manages to escape, but her application for British citizenship is denied. Amy intervenes to stop Ning's deportation to China and interviews her about her connection to the Aramov clan's operations. Ning is accepted into CHERUB, and Ryan introduces her to his friends while she waits to begin basic training.
