= The Killing (novel) =

2005 novel by Robert Muchamore

- First edition cover
- Author: Robert Muchamore
- Language: English
- Series: CHERUB
- Genre: Children's, Thriller, Spy novel
- Publisher: Hodder and Stoughton
- Publication date: 13 October 2005
- Publication place: United Kingdom
- Media type: Print (paperback)
- Pages: 320
- ISBN: 0-340-89433-4 (first edition, paperback)
- OCLC: 60794097
- Preceded by: Maximum Security
- Followed by: Divine Madness

The Killing is the fourth novel of the CHERUB series by Robert Muchamore. The book chronicles the adventures of the CHERUB agents investigating a small-time crook who suddenly makes it big. Muchamore named the book after the film The Killing. The novel was generally well received, but, unlike its predecessor, received no awards.

== Plot ==
James Adams is partnered with his sister Lauren, Bethany and Jake Parker and grey-shirt Dana Smith on a simulated warfare training exercise. The cherubs participating in the exercise are each given eggs labelled with their names, with the team with the fewest eggs remaining at the end of the exercise receiving a lengthy run as punishment. Despite James' lack of preparation for the exercise, his team manages to finish with more eggs than a rival team led by Kerry Chang. Regardless, Norman Large decides to fail James' team due to his grudge against Lauren. James, Lauren and Dana protest and Large is ultimately demoted as head training instructor, while Kerry's team is punished instead. When James goes to visit her later, Kerry becomes tired of James' attitude and dumps him. As James leaves Kerry's room, he beats up red-shirt Andy Lagan for laughing at him. For this, James is suspended from missions, and is also ostracized by his friends. Zara Asker takes pity on James and arranges for him to work with Dave Moss on a low-risk mission in the London suburb of Palm Hill. The target is Leon Tarasov, a Russian-born small-time criminal who has mysteriously come into a large sum of money. The two acquaint themselves with Tarasov, who gives Dave a job at his car dealership. James begins dating a girl named Hannah Clarke. During his first night in Palm Hill, James gets into an altercation and is subsequently arrested by police officer Michael Patel, who assaults James as he places him into the police car. Hannah tells James how her cousin, Will, fell from their apartment building a year earlier, and gives him Will's old computer.

While looking at Will's computer, James finds that Will was in possession of a CD with information about a robbery at a casino that happened shortly before his death. Conferring with their police liaison, ex-cherub Millie Kentner, the team discovers that the CD's contents also implicate Patel and Kentner's ex-colleague Eric Crisp and Patel's wife Patricia, both former employees of the casino. A few days later, Hannah reveals that after Will's death, Patel had run over to his body and touched it, supposedly to see if he was still alive. James and Dave deduce that Patel had killed Will and touched the body to provide plausible deniability for any forensic evidence he had left behind. To help find more evidence to implicate Patel, Kerry and Lauren join the team to steal financial statements from Patel's house. The team deduces from Patel's financial records that he also participated in the casino robbery, working with Tarasov and using Will's technical aptitude and Patricia and Crisp's security credentials to break into the casino, and that Patel killed Will to prevent him confessing to his role in the crime. Alone with Kerry, James kisses her; she reciprocates, but tells him that she is still not talking to him.

In order to gather enough evidence to arrest Tarasov and Patel, the team decides to provoke an altercation between the two by replacing Patricia's car (purchased from Tarasov) with a cut-and-shut, while Dave plants listening devices in Tarasov's office. In the resulting argument, Tarasov and Patel both incriminate themselves for the casino robbery and Patel's murder of Will, as well as for bribing Patel's colleague Alan Falco to cover up witness statements implicating Patel. When confronted, Falco agrees to testify against Patel and Tarasov in exchange for immunity from prosecution, and Patel and Tarasov are arrested. Returning to campus, James confesses to Kerry his love for her, and she agrees to talk to him again.

In the epilogue, Tarasov is sentenced to 12 years in prison, while Patel is sentenced to life with a non-parole period of 18 years. Kentner, disheartened by the police corruption uncovered in the subsequent investigation, transfers to the CIB. James is welcomed back by his friends, though Kerry decides - for the time being - to not take him back as her boyfriend.
