= Rock War =

Series of young adult novels by Robert Muchamore

- Rock War; The Audition (novella); Boot Camp; Gone Wild; Crash Landing
- Author: Robert Muchamore
- Country: United Kingdom
- Language: English
- Genre: Young adult
- Publisher: Hodder Children's Books
- Media type: Print (paperback)

Rock War is a series of young adult novels by English author Robert Muchamore. The series follows three aspiring teenage musicians, Jay Thomas, Summer Smith and Dylan Wilton, as they appear on the fictional reality show Rock War.

== Books ==
=== Rock War ===
Rock War is the first book in the series. It was published on 27 February 2014. The novel features the main character in the series, Jay Thomas. Other characters in the book are his older brothers Theo and Adam Richardson, who each cause mayhem around places. It also stars Jay's younger brother, Hank. At the start of the book Jay plays in a band named Brontobyte, with members Tristan, Salman and Alfie. He later gets kicked out of the band, and makes a new band with Jay's older brothers and lead drummer Babatunde. The novel also features Summer Smith, who lives in a flat with her old grandmother, and Dylan, a lazy boy who goes to Yellocote boarding school. The three characters' bands all take part in the fictional reality show Rock War.

=== The Audition ===
The Audition is a World Book Day novella, published on 6 March 2014.

=== Boot Camp ===
Boot Camp is the second book in the series, published on 1 October 2015.

=== Gone Wild ===
Gone Wild is the third book in the series. It was published on 6 October 2016 and was originally planned to be titled Battle Zone.

=== Crash Landing ===
Crash Landing is the fourth book in the series, published on 5 October 2017.
