= Dark Sun (novella) =

2008 novel by Robert Muchamore

- First edition cover
- Author: Robert Muchamore
- Cover artist: Chris Viggo
- Language: English
- Series: CHERUB
- Genre: Children's, Thriller, Spy novel
- Publisher: Hodder and Stoughton
- Publication date: 6 March 2008
- Publication place: United Kingdom
- Media type: Print (paperback)
- Pages: 108
- Preceded by: The Sleepwalker
- Followed by: The General

Dark Sun is a World Book Day novella in the popular CHERUB series by Robert Muchamore. It fits into the series between The Sleepwalker and The General.

== Plot ==
Following the previous book 'Mad Dogs', Greg "Rat" Rathbone is on an undercover mission to befriend the son of notorious activist, Kurt Lydon, and change the plan of his nuclear system. Rat is soon invited to a sleepover by Lydon's son George and after defeating a group of bullies in a fight earns further popularity from George and his overweight Chinese friend, Zhang.

Back at campus, Lauren Adams, Jake Parker and Andy Lagan are forced to do physical training on the assault course after messing around in front of a guest speaker. Although overseen by volunteers James Adams and Bruce Norris, Andy is severely injured but still takes part in the mission, posing as Rat's Scottish cousin.

At the sleepover, Rat and Andy sedate George, Zhang and Lydon's wife and begin hacking into Lydon's laptop but are interrupted by George's older sister, Sophie. She badly injures Rat by breaking a vase over his head. After a vicious struggle, the boys sedate her and finish the job.

The book ends with Lydon and several other suspects being imprisoned and a new library being opened on campus on World Book Day.
