= June Fisher =

British head teacher and trade unionist

- Born: 18 September 1929; Chatham, England, UK
- Died: 30 November 1995 (aged 66)
- Education: St Joseph's Convent and the University of Bristol
- Occupations: teacher and trade unionist
- Known for: President of the NUT

June Rosemary Fisher previously June Rosemary Thorndycraft born June Rosemary Lewis (18 September 1929 – 30 November 1995) was a British head teacher and trade unionist.

== Life ==
Fisher was born in Chatham in Kent in 1929. Her father, Harry Llewellyn Jones Lewis, was a haulage contractor but when her mother, Florence Edith (born Brewington), married again she took the surname of her step father John Thomas Thorndycraft in 1937. and she went on to Bristol University where she was known as a supporter of the Conservative Party. She began teaching history at Peckham Girls' School in 1958 where the head, Margaret Clarke, was active in the National Union of Teachers (NUT). She became Fisher's mentor despite Clarke's strong support for communism. Clarke was also an advocate for comprehensive education.

In 1965 she left Peckham for Camden to take up a position of deputy head at Acland Burghley School where she became the acting head. In 1971 she left Camden for Catford to lead what was then called Camden School for Girls.

She was still active in the NUT during the 1980s where she supported a less militant approach to industrial relations then some within the union. She joined the NUT's executive and she was elected to be the union's president for a year in 1989. She had played a key role in the development of the "CSE" qualification and in persuading the government to fund a single exam "the GCSE" for secondary children at age 16.

During her first speech to the union she criticised those who were whinging and argued that the NUT needed to "achieve change from within".

She became a widow in 1992 and she retired from teaching in 1994. She died on November 30, 1995, of cancer.

== Private life ==
She married Professor Geoffrey Partington and they divorced in 1967. The following year she married another headteacher Robert Samuel Fisher and they had two sons.
