= The General (Muchamore novel) =

2008 novel by Robert Muchamore

- Author: Robert Muchamore
- Language: English
- Series: CHERUB
- Genre: Children's; Thriller; Spy novel
- Publisher: Hodder and Stoughton
- Publication date: 7 August 2008
- Publication place: United Kingdom
- Media type: Print (paperback)
- Pages: 352 pp
- ISBN: 978-0-340-93184-4
- OCLC: 230989531
- Preceded by: The Sleepwalker; Dark Sun
- Followed by: Brigands M.C.

The General is the tenth novel in the CHERUB series by Robert Muchamore. The primary action of the novel is set in the Nevada desert during a joint training exercise of American and British troops.

== Plot ==
James Adams is on a mission to infiltrate anarchist group SAG (Street Action Group), whose charismatic leader Chris Bradford plans to escalate to acts of terrorism. James acts as Bradford's bodyguard during a meeting with an arms dealer and successfully plants a surveillance device on the dealer, only for the police to arrive unexpectedly and arrest everyone, having already placed the dealer under surveillance. James returns to campus to discover that his girlfriend Dana Smith has been cheating on him with fellow cherub Michael Hendry, and breaks up with her.

Meanwhile, Lauren, Rat, Bethany, Jake, Kevin and Ronan are sent to test the security of an air traffic control centre. They manage to gain access to the centre and incapacitate the security guards, but miss an engineer who calls in the RAF. The mission is still regarded as successful, having exposed security weaknesses.

On New Year's Day a select team of CHERUB agents, including James and Lauren, fly to Las Vegas for a brief vacation on the way to Fort Reagan, the world's largest urban warfare training compound. They are to take part in a two-week exercise along with forty British SAS commandos, posing as insurgents in an area controlled by an American battalion of a thousand soldiers. Weapons are restricted to paint guns and grenades.

Under the leadership of Ukrainian trainer Yosyp Kazakov, who is bitterly anti-American, the "insurgents" soon make their first move, knocking out aerial surveillance by wrecking the American spy drones. During this raid, James and a British sergeant sneak into the army base to add a powerful laxative to the base's water system, incapacitating the majority of the American troops. The "insurgents" persuade some drunken students, posing as "civilians" in the exercise, to join them in storming the base. The American commander General Shirley is "killed" by a paint grenade dropped by Kevin. The Americans are overrun and suspend the exercise after only two days.

Kazakov's tactics, though effective, are so controversial that he is asked to leave before the exercise restarts; James is also forced to leave for his own safety after Shirley petulantly reveals James' role in poisoning the troops. As they have some free time, Kazakov persuades James to put his mathematical skills to illegal use, counting cards on blackjack tables in Las Vegas. Despite James almost being caught, they end up winning over $90,000.

Arriving back at campus, Lauren confronts James about his exploits, having deduced that he was responsible from news coverage while she was in Las Vegas, but refuses to report him. She also reveals that James' ex-girlfriend Kerry has broken with her boyfriend Bruce.

== Promotion ==
An official competition was run by Robert Muchamore, where a signed copy of the book was promised to any reader who could supply him with the password of one of his forum staff members.

The novel was released on 7 August 2008 in Australia and NZ, and on 4 September in the UK.

== Cover ==
The British cover for The General is two playing cards. One is the Jack of Hearts, with 2 bullet holes in it, and the other shows a red CHERUB logo.
