= Shadow Wave =

2010 novel by Robert Muchamore

- Author: Robert Muchamore
- Language: English
- Series: CHERUB
- Genre: Children's, Thriller, Spy novel
- Publisher: Hodder and Stoughton
- Publication date: United Kingdom: August 26, 2010
- Publication place: United Kingdom
- Media type: Print (hardback) (paperback in May 2011), print (paperback)
- Pages: 343
- ISBN: 978-0-340-95647-2
- Preceded by: Brigands M.C.
- Followed by: People's Republic

Shadow Wave is the twelfth novel in the CHERUB series by Robert Muchamore. It was published by Hodder Children's Books (ISBN 9780340956472) on 26 August 2010, and features the final mission of the long-standing central character James Adams. A limited edition of Shadow Wave, with an orange cover (designed by Callum East), was made available exclusively at W.H.Smith. Details of Muchamore's plans to create a small three-book series called "Aramov" without James, were revealed via a secret website detailed on the back pages of all copies of the book.

== Plot ==
James Adams continues to work to infiltrate Brigands M.C. and to bring down its leader Ralph "The Führer" Donnington. Kerry Chang also joins the mission to pose as an interpreter in a set-up weapons deal. The police surround them and the Führer tries to escape but ends up falling down a cliff and breaking his leg. He is taken into police custody.

James returns to CHERUB campus to attend a wedding between mission controller Chloe Blake and her fiancé. At the wedding, he is reunited with several ex-CHERUB agents and former staff members, including Kyle Blueman, Norman Large, Dana Smith and Amy Collins. Kyle finds a mission briefing for James' final mission, where he, Lauren Adams and Kevin Sumner are to act as the children of David Secombe, an important figure in the UK government who is negotiating a weapons deal with Malaysian Defence Minister Tan Abdullah. Kyle tells James about how, when he was assisting in a CHERUB basic training course in Malaysia in 2004, he met a teenager named Aizat Rakyat who told him how Abdullah was demolishing native villages to make way for building luxury hotels. In the aftermath of the Boxing Day tsunami, Abdullah evicts the inhabitants of Aizat's village to build more hotels on their land. James, disgusted, quits the mission and joins Kyle in a scheme to embarrass Abdullah.

James sneaks into Lauren's room and installs a tracking device in her mobile phone. As James is about to leave, he encounters Bruce, who is despondent after breaking up with his girlfriend Bethany Parker; to cheer him up, James invites him along. Together, they go and meet Helena Bayliss, runner of charity Guilt Trips, journalist Hugh Verhoeven, and former arms salesman Dion Frei, who are working to discredit Abdullah. Lauren and Kevin go on a shopping trip with the son and daughter of Tan Abdullah, and James, using the tracking device in Lauren's phone, invites protesters to their locations, embarrassing Tan Abdullah's family. Meanwhile, Frei, claiming to act on behalf of the French government, offers Abdullah a weapons deal that is more favourable than Britain's offer and secretly films Abdullah making disparaging remarks about the Malaysian Prime Minister and accepting a bribe as part of the French agreement. When Abdullah's actions are revealed to the media, Abdullah commits suicide in his private jet to avoid further embarrassment. James and Bruce return to CHERUB campus and are confronted by chairwoman Zara Asker, who has deduced their involvement. However, due to the implications were CHERUB's role in Abdullah's downfall to be revealed, she decides not to take any action against them.

James leaves for Stanford University in California, and changes his name to Robert James Choke for post-CHERUB life. A year later, he returns to the UK to visit Kerry and Lauren. The three visit Gwen Choke's grave, and Kerry tells James and Lauren that their mother would be very proud of them.

In the epilogue, the Führer is sentenced to 16 years in prison for weapons smuggling, and is also charged with the quadruple murder of Dante Welsh's family; Aizat attends university with a grant from Guilt Trips; David Secombe brokers a smaller arms deal between the UK and Malaysia; Dana drops out of art college; Bethany is expelled from CHERUB for continuing a relationship with a boy she had met on a mission; Bruce, inspired by Verhoeven, plans to study journalism; Kyle continues his law studies; Gabrielle enters medical school; Lauren's father Ron Onions is released from prison and dies of cancer several months later with Lauren, Bethany and Rat the only ones at his funeral; Kerry joins James at Stanford; and James finally meets his father, a mathematics lecturer.

== Release information ==
The book was released on 27 August 2010 in hardback edition (2 September in some locations). The paperback version was released in May 2011. A special edition of the book was available at W H Smith with an orange cover. The book was the second in the series to be released in hardback format.
