= The Sleepwalker (novel) =

2008 novel by Robert Muchamore

- Front cover
- Author: Robert Muchamore
- Language: English
- Series: CHERUB
- Genre: Children's, Thriller, Spy novel
- Publisher: Hodder and Stoughton
- Publication date: United Kingdom; Australia; 7 February 2008
- Publication place: United Kingdom
- Media type: Print (paperback)
- Preceded by: Mad Dogs
- Followed by: Dark Sun; The General

The Sleepwalker is the ninth novel in the CHERUB series by Robert Muchamore. It was released in February 2008. The book features Lauren Adams and Jake Parker in the lead roles, investigating an airline crash that a mentally disturbed boy called Fahim claims was caused by his father. Meanwhile, James Adams has a subplot doing work experience with Kerry Chang at a fast food restaurant. This is the first CHERUB book to feature Lauren in the lead role, with James' story as a subplot.

== Plot ==
A plane crashes over the Atlantic, killing all 345 passengers on board, including the wife, daughter-in-law and two grandchildren of former CHERUB chairman Dr. Terrence "Mac" McAfferty. A distressed 12-year-old boy, Fahim Bin Hassam, calls the air crash investigation hotline and attempts to implicate his father Hassam, but gives in to his fear and hangs up before he can relay any significant information. However, details of the call reach Mac. The call, combined with the recent disappearance of Hassam's wife Yasmin, Hassam's brother Asif's presence on the no-fly list, and the disaster's proximity to the anniversary of 9/11, make Mac suspicious.

Lauren Adams and Jake Parker are sent on a mission to befriend Fahim and discover the truth behind the plane crash, with Mac acting as mission controller. Lauren and Jake plant listening devices in the Bin Hassam house, but they are discovered by Hassam, who takes Fahim to a safehouse while he plans his escape from the country. He also reveals to Fahim that he killed Yasmin for threatening to go to the police after the plane crash. Fahim is able to alert Lauren and Rat (who was visiting Lauren), who follow Asif to a warehouse and incapacitate him before using his phone to trace Fahim's location. Fahim attempts to flee but is caught by Hassam. When an armed response team arrives, Hassam holds Fahim at knifepoint, but Jake attacks Hassam, allowing Fahim to escape. Hassam, unwilling to spend the rest of his life in prison, claims to be armed and is promptly shot dead. Back at the warehouse, Mac discovers that the plane crash was not an act of terrorism as was suspected, but instead caused by expired aircraft components that Hassam and Asif had altered to look new before using their shipping business to transport the parts for a smuggling gang. Asif is arrested for his complicity in the conspiracy. Fahim is taken in to start life at CHERUB, but when surveillance footage shows that he sleepwalks and talks in his sleep about things he has done, CHERUB chairwoman Zara Asker states that it is too dangerous to send him on missions because he might blow his cover. Instead, Fahim is adopted by Mac. As Mac goes to break the news to Fahim, he shows Lauren a farewell message written by his grandson moments before the crash.

Meanwhile, to his dismay, James Adams is assigned work experience at a local chicken restaurant with Kerry Chang. They befriend their colleague Gemma, but during a night out James sees Gemma's boyfriend Danny assaulting her and knocks him out. On the last day of their work experience, Gemma shows up with a black eye, while Danny arrives with a baseball bat and tries to goad James into attacking him by assaulting Gemma. Kerry, enraged, grabs the bat and brutally beats Danny. Zara uses her influence to help the two escape prosecution, but gives them decorating duty as punishment. While working together on their punishment, Kerry kisses James and offers to have sex with him. To his surprise, James decides to remain loyal to Dana and declines.
