= Classroom Chaos =

British TV documentary programme

Classroom Chaos was a controversial British TV documentary programme aired in 2005 on Five in which a retired teacher under the pseudonym "Sylvia Thomas" (real name Angela Mason) returned undercover as a substitute teacher after a 30-year teaching gap. She claimed her objective was to show the "chaos" teachers must deal with in the classroom.

The filming used hidden cameras in a button and a briefcase. Thomas filmed pupils smashing chairs, fighting, and swearing; some pupils also falsely accused her of touching them. Children aged 12 to 15 were featured completely ignoring the supply teacher and other staff, shouting, screaming, fighting, swearing, downloading porn, and wandering around the classroom.

The programme was filmed at 15 secondary schools in London and the north of England. The supply agencies she contacted chose the schools randomly; recent inspection reports did not consider any of the schools to be failing.

== Controversy ==
The National Union of Teachers condemned the programme, saying it was not fair on the children to film them secretly.

The General Teaching Council regulator found Angela Mason guilty of unprofessional conduct.

The Conservative party was quick to push their message of classroom discipline and more pupil referral units for children expelled from school. However, the Government insisted that schools must take their fair share of disruptive pupils.
