= Marc Kilgour =

- Henderson's Boys character
- First appearance: The Escape
- Created by: Robert Muchamore
- Birth name: Marc Kilgour

In-universe information
- Gender: Male
- Occupation: CHERUB agent
- Family: Orphan
- Nationality: French

Marc Kilgour is a fictional character from the Henderson's Boys series of books by Robert Muchamore. He was born in France not long before World War II. He was found by Charles Henderson and helped him to foil Nazi Germany's planned invasion of Great Britain.

== Background and early life ==
Kilgour was found as a baby at the Beauvais train station in France. His mother was never located, so he spent his life up to the age of 12 at an all-boys orphanage run by the Catholic Church in Beauvais.

== Physical appearance ==
Marc is handsome and of stocky build. He has greenish blue eyes and tangled blond hair. He lost one front tooth at age 12; it was pulled out by a Gestapo officer.

== Academia ==
Marc is very intelligent and particularly good at languages. A friendly teacher taught him German as a child, which helped him during Eagle Day, and he picks up English very quickly.

== Appearances ==
=== The Escape ===
The story begins with Marc being beaten by the 'headmaster' of his orphanage. During the air raid that follows, Marc takes his chance and runs away, stealing some of the Headmaster's belongings. He ends up in Charles Henderson's empty house (unaware of its owner). A group of Gestapo officers break into the house, hoping to find Henderson who is not there. They interrogate Marc (and pull out his front tooth in the process). Charles Henderson finds Marc in his house and, with Paul and Rosie Clarke, sets out for the port so they can return to England. Marc does not go with Paul and Rosie, as he has no passport. The story ends on a cliff-hanger with the news that the Cardiff Bay, the boat on which Paul and Rosie were sailing, has been sunk.

=== Eagle Day ===
In Eagle Day Marc helps Henderson foil the Invasion of Britain plot. When entering a war zone Charles Henderson pretends to be a farmer. It turns out that Farmers are not allowed in, so the Officer at the entrance writes him down as a translator. After a couple of weeks of working as a translator, Henderson manages to get Marc a job too. The story ends with the group arriving in England and meeting Eileen McAfferty.

=== Secret Army ===
At the beginning of the book, Marc has an operation to remove the fragmented root of the tooth that was pulled out by the Gestapo at a dentist in London. Afterwards, Henderson forgets to collect him and he is forced to find his way back to Henderson's gentleman club by himself, where he finds Henderson drunk. That night, German bombers drop incendiary bombs on the club, and Marc battles his way through the smoke to rescue an old man who is trapped, suffering smoke inhalation. This brings him to the attention of an Admiral, who gives Marc a present and offers to help the struggling unit secure a spot on a training exercise.

He returns to campus for a few days, before travelling with the rest of Group A for a parachute training course. Marc discovers that he has a fear of heights, and is too scared to jump out of a plane the first time around. He is depressed afterwards, but is offered a second chance and, after encouragement from Paul, performs his jump near-perfectly. He then travels north to Scotland with the rest of the CHERUB team on a training exercise to try and capture an anti-aircraft gun, where he helps steal and transport the gun to London's King's Cross Station.

=== Grey Wolves ===
Marc is sent into occupied France with Charles Henderson. The pair pose as father and son under the name "Hourtefuex". They meet Madame Mercier, a local businesswoman who helps the pair throughout the novel. After scoping out the French town, they return to England. Marc undergoes interrogation training with Troy LeConte during, he gets blasted with cold water tortured. He manages to get through the interrogation and is chosen to return to France along with five other recruits Joel, Rosie, Paul, PT and Troy.

During this mission, Marc works alongside Henderson in Madame Mercier's most expensive and well-established bar as a cigarette boy. When a German officer is killed, security is ramped up and several people are rounded up. This includes Marc who was attempting to take a piece of code on paper delivered by Joel beside a bin outside their home, when a Gestapo officer found him attempting to hide. The officer takes Marc to the local jail. Here he finds Madame Mercier and several other bar and restaurant owners of the town. After a few days wait Marc is set to be released, but when Oberst Bauer thinks he could be useful to gain information out of Henderson, he is made wait in a cell for longer. Eventually he is let out. He is briefly tortured until he signs an admission saying that he moved black market food around for Madame Mercier. For this he is sent to jail where he is quickly preyed upon by a fellow Spanish inmate. During an altercation Marc kills the Spaniard. For this he is put before a jailhouse judge who takes pity on him and knows he will be murdered if he is sent back to the cell. The judge sends him to a farm in Frankfurt, Germany. Oberst Bauer leads Henderson to believe that Marc is dead.

=== The Prisoner ===
See The Prisoner
