= New Guard (novel) =

2016 novel by Robert Muchamore

- Author: Robert Muchamore
- Language: English
- Series: CHERUB
- Genre: Thriller, Spy novel
- Publisher: Hodder & Stoughton
- Publication date: 2 June 2016 (UK)
- Publication place: United Kingdom
- Media type: Print
- Pages: 353
- ISBN: 978-1-4449-1409-2
- Preceded by: Lone Wolf

New Guard is the seventeenth and final novel in the CHERUB series by Robert Muchamore, and the fifth and final book in the Aramov series. It was published on 31 May 2016.

== Plot ==
Leon and Daniel Sharma, younger twin brothers of Ryan Sharma, are recruited for a mission in Birmingham with mission controller James Adams. Their task is to befriend Oliver "Oli" Lakshmi, a troubled youth and potential recruit for CHERUB with a reputation for elaborate but untrue stories who claims to have information on radical Islamic terror groups. Oli turns out to be a bully and a thief and is soon excluded as a potential recruit. However, Leon and Daniel learn from Oli of local crime boss Martin "Uncle" Jones. Ryan joins the mission and befriends Uncle.

During a tour of one of Uncle's scrapyards, Ryan learns that Uncle trades in second-hand oil refinery equipment, which is marked with the logo of Offshore Marine Exploration. Ryan and James investigate and find that Offshore Marine Exploration is a defunct oil company whose equipment is still used in the Middle East. They also learn of an also defunct company which repaired OME equipment. One of the company's three engineers was murdered in an airport hotel near Uncle's scrapyard. The other two engineers have gone missing, and James deduces that they were captured by the Islamic State to maintain a network of IS-controlled oil wells using OME equipment. After James presents the evidence to high-ranking officials in British intelligence, he agrees to form a team to rescue the hostages. Because of the British government's policy against military intervention against IS, James decides to recruit former CHERUB agents for the mission. He recruits his sister Lauren Adams, his fiance Kerry Chang, and his friends Kyle Blueman and Bruce Norris, along with Israeli intelligence officer Tovah. Before the mission, the rescue team are sent to CHERUB's summer hostel in the Mediterranean to train with Ryan and his friends. During training, James discovers that Bruce and Ning have started a relationship.

The rescuers plan to disable a lightly-defended oil well deep into IS territory in Syria, rescue the engineers when they arrive to repair the well, and escape to Turkey in microlight aircraft. While training in the microlights, Kerry is seriously injured in a bad crash landing. Ryan, who is nearing the end of his CHERUB career, volunteers to resign from CHERUB so he can join the mission in her stead. The team enter Syria, reach the well and rescue the hostages, and successfully escape into Turkey. Back on campus, James surreptitiously helps Ryan track down Natalka, the Aramov Clan associate Ryan had fallen in love with.

In the epilogue, Uncle is sentenced to life in prison for terrorism and money-laundering offenses; Ning retires from CHERUB and begins dating Bruce; Ryan reunites with Natalka and brings her to live with him in the UK while he attends university; Lauren becomes a racecar driver; Kerry becomes a mission controller; James and Kerry marry, and announce that they are expecting their first child.
