= Class A (novel) =

2004 novel by Robert Muchamore

- First edition cover
- Author: Robert Muchamore
- Language: English
- Series: CHERUB
- Genre: Children's, Thriller, Spy novel
- Published: 2004 (UK Hodder); 2011 (U.S. Simon Pulse)
- Publication place: United Kingdom
- Media type: Print (paperback)
- Pages: 287
- ISBN: 0-340-88154-2 (first edition, paperback)
- OCLC: 56651811
- Preceded by: The Recruit
- Followed by: Maximum Security

Class A, published as The Dealer in the United States, and as The Mission for 5000 prints, is the second book in the Robert Muchamore's novel series CHERUB. It continues the story of teenager James Adams and his fellow CHERUB agents as they try to bring down a drug gang led by Keith Moore. The book was originally to be called Drugs, Cars and Guns, but this was changed so as to sound more appropriate for children. It received generally good reviews although not as many awards as its predecessor, The Recruit. It is followed by Maximum Security.

It was released in the United Kingdom by Hodder Children's Books on 14 October 2004, and as The Dealer by Simon Pulse in the United States on 23 August 2011.

== Plot ==
CHERUB agents James, Kerry, Kyle and Nicole are sent on a mission to infiltrate the drug gang KMG, led by criminal Keith Moore. The group attempts to befriend Moore's four children to attempt to gather evidence against KMG. James has the most success, becoming friends with Keith's youngest son Junior and begins delivering cocaine to KMG's customers. Meanwhile, Nicole begins dating Junior and they take a large amount of cocaine, nearly killing Nicole and resulting in her expulsion from CHERUB.

Kerry discovers KMG's cocaine processing location, and MI5 set up surveillance on it, resulting in the capture and imprisonment of many of KMG's senior members, but not Keith Moore. Moore invites James and Junior to come with him to Miami, intending to settle his accounts before going into hiding to avoid imprisonment. Before James leaves, he is sent back to campus for a hacking course, where he finds out that Lauren hit instructor Norman Large with a shovel while during basic training. Lauren is forced to wait 3 months until she can restart basic training and is punished with ditch-digging duty in the meantime.

In Miami, men from KMG's drug supplier, the Peruvian Lambayeke cartel, attempt to rob Moore. James is forced to kill one of the gunmen to escape and alerts the authorities. Moore is extradited back to the UK to face trial, while the remnants of KMG are also arrested. After the end of the mission, James and Kerry begin dating.

== Development ==
The book was originally to be titled Class A 'Drugs, Cars & Guns, but Hodder deemed it too inappropriate for a children's book, so Muchamore changed the title to Class A.

When the book was published in America, publisher Simon Pulse renamed it The Dealer, due to concern that Americans wouldn't understand the title's reference to the British system of classing drugs.

As a further order from a major book club, 5,000 copies were printed with the name The Mission as they didn't like the original title.

A graphic novel adaption of the novel was published on 1 June 2017.

== Audiobook ==
An audiobook version of Class A was released, read by Julian Rhind-Tutt. It consisted of three CDs.
