= Henderson's Boys =

Series of young adult spy novels by Robert Muchamore

- The Escape; Eagle Day; Secret Army; Grey Wolves; The Prisoner; One Shot Kill; Scorched Earth
- Author: Robert Muchamore
- Cover artist: David McDougal
- Country: United Kingdom
- Language: English and Danish
- Genre: Children's; Spy fiction
- Publisher: Hodder Children's Books
- Media type: Print (paperback)

Henderson's Boys is a young adult series of spy novels by the English author Robert Muchamore. The series follows Charles Henderson, the creator of the fictitious CHERUB organisation. The novels are set between 1940 and 1945, during the Nazi occupation of France in the Second World War. Throughout the novels, Henderson leads a series of war missions, aided by children.

Henderson's Boys is a spin-off and a prequel of the CHERUB series, which centres on the peacetime version of the organisation during the 2000s and 2010s. Henderson's Boys reveals various features of the CHERUB organisation's origins.

== Books ==
=== The Escape ===
The Escape
- Published: 2009 (Hodder)
- Media type: Print (paperback)
- Pages: 320
- ISBN: 978-0-340-95648-9

The Escape is the first book in the Henderson's Boys series. It was published on 5 February 2009 by Hodder Children's Books.

The novel is set in France, from 5 to 15 June 1940, at a time when Hitler's Nazi armies are invading and forcing civilians to flee. Meanwhile, German agents are tracking two British children, 11-year-old Paul and 13-year-old Rosie Clarke. Charles Henderson, a British spy, finds himself trying to reach them before the Germans can. He enlists the help of 12-year-old Marc Kilgour, a French orphan, in order to save the pair. He soon realises that children will be essential recruits if the British are to win the war. Meanwhile, Paul and Rosie find a six-year-old called Hugo, who is later killed by Herr Potente, a German posing as Henderson.

The Escape has received a positive reception from critics, with Toby Clements of The Daily Telegraph calling it "fresh and direct", but noting that the subject matter is "challenging". Amanda Craig of The Times said that "this clever, tense novel is a great way of getting bored boys interested in history".

It was published in French under the literally translated title of L'évasion, in Polish as Uciekinierzy, which translates to The Escapees, in German under the literally translated title of die Flucht, and in Portuguese under the literally translated title of A Evasão.

=== Eagle Day ===
Eagle Day
- Published: 2009 (Hodder)
- Media type: Print (paperback)
- Pages: 432
- ISBN: 978-0-340-95649-6

Eagle Day is the second book in the Henderson's Boys series. It was published on 4 June 2009 by Hodder Children's Books.

The novel is set from 15 June to 1 October 1940. During this time, the Battle of Britain is in full swing and Hitler is planning to cross the channel and invade Britain. After failing to escape from France, Paul and Rosie reunite with Marc and Henderson. With the help of PT Bivott, an American boy in trouble with the law, they help British bombers to target ports in France that will be used to invade Britain in Operation Sealion.

It was published in French under the literally translated title of Le Jour de l'aigle, in Polish under the literally translated title of Dzień Orła, and in Portuguese under the literally translated title of O Dia da Águia.

=== Secret Army ===
Secret Army
- Published: 2010 (Hodder)
- Media type: Print (paperback)
- Pages: 384
- ISBN: 978-0-340-95650-2

Secret Army is the third book in the Henderson's Boys series. It was published on 4 February 2010 by Hodder Children's Books.

The novel is set from January to February 1941. The British spy Charles Henderson has returned to Britain, having thwarted Nazi invasion plans, and wants to start an organisation training teenagers as secret agents. Secret Army concerns the training of the first group of agents of his new organisation (named CHERUB by the end of the book) - Paul and Rosie Clarke, Marc Kilgour, PT Bivott, Luc, and Joel, together with the recruitment of the first members of Group B. Their training takes place in a requisitioned village, with parachute training in Scotland, followed by an exercise where the CHERUB team, and groups of Polish, Norwegian and French SOE agents, are parachuted over northern England and instructed to steal an anti-aircraft gun and deliver it to Kings Cross station in London within 48 hours. Despite Air Vice Marshal Walker, the head of SOE, wanting the CHERUB agents to fail, they deliver two guns.

It was published in French under the literally translated title of L'Armée secrète, in Polish under the literally translated title of Sekretna armia, and in Portuguese under the literally translated title of A Arma Secreta.

=== Grey Wolves ===
Grey Wolves
- Published: 2011 (Hodder)
- Media type: Print (paperback)
- Pages: 384
- ISBN: 978-0-340-99916-5

Grey Wolves is the 4th book in the Henderson's Boys series. It was published on 3 February 2011 by Hodder Children's Books.

The novel is set from 20 April to early August 1941. It begins with Marc Kilgour and Charles Henderson on a fact-gathering mission in the town of Lorient, on the Atlantic coast of France, in preparation for a possible future sabotage of the U-boat bases there.

They meet a local woman, Madame Mercier, who gets Marc into a part of the docks where he can take photos of the U-boat bunker. After this, they sail back to a rendezvous with a boat from the UK, named Madeline, but two nights later, they are stopped by a German E-boat, but after a shootout, Troy LeConte reveals that Henderson's son has been born.

After a brief period of time in England, they go back into occupied France, where Joel and PT get jobs with the Organisation Todt, an organization which commandeered resources for German military usage, and Paul, Boo and Rosie work as a team to communicate with London, and Marc is a cigarette boy at a brothel-bar.

It was published in French under the title of Opération U-Boot, which translates to Operation U-Boat.

=== The Prisoner ===
The Prisoner
- Published: 2012 (Hodder)
- Media type: Print (paperback)
- Pages: 368
- ISBN: 978-0-340-99917-2

The Prisoner is the fifth book in the Henderson's Boys series. It expressly follows the escape of Marc Kilgour, a British spy working for the organisation CHERUB during the Second World War who was moved to a German labour team in Frankfurt in the previous book. It was published on 2 February 2012 by Hodder Children's Books.

The novel is set from May to September 1942. Fourteen-year-old Marc Kilgour is a Nazi prisoner of war, who is also a British spy working for the secret organisation CHERUB. Held in Frankfurt with a job filing prisoner records, he attempts to escape with three other boys by forging prisoner transfer documents and escaping from the transfer train. However the guard at the station recognises Marc and has him sent back to his boss, Commandant Vogel while the two boys Marc was escaping with continue on. Vogel assumes the transfer was a paperwork error and has him back working his filing job. However, when he arrives back at his dormitory, a gang of bullies find that he is no longer protected by the three boys he was attempting to escape with, and they get into a fight where Marc is eventually knocked unconscious.

When Marc regains consciousness, Commandant Vogel has been replaced by a new commandant who works out that he tried to escape and he is reassigned as a sewage system cleaner. When he sees a chance to escape, Marc bolts but is forced to kill several German guards in the process and a search is put out for him. He hides out in the office where he originally worked for a few days where he forges paperwork for himself. He uses it to take a train from Frankfurt to Mainz, to Saarbrücken and then on to Paris.

After hiding out for a few days, Marc is picked up for discrepancies in his paperwork. He admits to actually being Marc Kilgour who previously went to an orphanage in Beauvais. The policeman does not realise he had escaped from prison and he is sent back to the orphanage. When he arrives he is pleased to find that the cruel Director Tomas has been replaced by a group of nuns. He is sent back to work for Farmer Morel and gets into a serious relationship with his daughter Jae.

Two months pass, and Marc becomes used to life at the orphanage. However, when Marc finds two Canadian soldiers who landed at the unsuccessful landings at Dieppe, they help him get back in contact with the resistance group that Charles Henderson set up the previous year, which is being run by Maxine Clere. The resistance group decides to sabotage a German military airbase with a sophisticatedradar system that has been causing heavy casualties to the British bombers. They also plan to steal a plane and fly it back to give scientists in Britain a functioning radar set in the hope that they can jam the radar signals. A pilot is parachuted in and the raid goes according to plan, but one of the soldiers is killed. They reach England and Marc is reunited with his old friends at CHERUB, however he is still sad about Jae.

It was published in French under the literally translated title of Le Prisonnier.

=== One Shot Kill ===
One Shot Kill
- Published: 2012 (Hodder)
- Media type: Print (paperback)
- Pages: 352
- ISBN: 978-0-340-99918-9

One Shot Kill is the sixth book in the Henderson's Boys series. It was published on 1 November 2012 by Hodder Children's Books.

The novel is set from 16 May to 3 July 1943, when Hitler is developing a radical new weapon which he claims could turn the war back in his favor. Henderson's Boys have to find the weapon and sabotage all efforts to produce it. Four of the boys undergo sniper training, and the team is sent in to scout the area but something goes wrong. After many days in occupied France, a new target is located and they must hunt down the elusive war-turning weapon.

It was published in French under the title of Tireurs d'élites, which translates to Snipers.

=== Scorched Earth ===
Scorched Earth
- Published: 2013 (Hodder)
- Media type: Print (paperback)
- Pages: 368
- ISBN: 978-1-444-90233-4

Scorched Earth is the seventh and final book in the Henderson's Boys series. It was published on 7 February 2013 by Hodder Children's Books.

The novel is set from 5 June to 24 August 1944, during the final days of the Nazi occupation of France. During this time, large sections of the French population are in rebellion and the Nazis are at their most brutal. Henderson and his team embark on a mission to sabotage German supply lines but are soon redirected to stop the 108th Heavy Tank Battalion from reaching the D-Day landings. Their orders are to complete this task at any cost. Near the start of the book, Rosie Clarke is killed.

It was published in French under the title of L'ultime Combat, which translates to The Final Battle.

== See also ==
- Boy Commandos
