= CHERUB =

Series of novels by Robert Muchamore

- CHERUB logo
- CHERUB; The Recruit; Class A; Maximum Security; The Killing; Divine Madness; Man vs Beast; The Fall; Mad Dogs; The Sleepwalker; Dark Sun (novella); The General; Brigands M.C.; Shadow Wave; Aramov; People's Republic; Guardian Angel; Black Friday; Lone Wolf; New Guard
- Author: Robert Muchamore
- Country: United Kingdom
- Genre: Young adult spy fiction
- Publisher: Hodder & Stoughton
- Published: 30 April 2004
- Media type: Print (hardback and paperback); eBook
- No. of books: 17 + 1 short story

CHERUB (/ˈtʃɛrəb/) is a series of teenage spy novels written by English author Robert Muchamore, focusing around a fictional division of the British Security Service called CHERUB, which employs children, predominantly orphans, as intelligence agents.

The series primarily follows James Choke, who adopts the name James Adams in the first book, as he enters CHERUB and performs various missions. The focus later expands to other characters, such as James' sister Lauren, and several other characters who work alongside him and in separate missions. The initial series of 13 novels runs from the recruitment of Adams aged 11 to his retirement from CHERUB at age 17. The second series of five novels, Aramov, follows Ryan Sharma, another CHERUB agent; James Adams reappears in this series as a CHERUB staff member.

Muchamore also wrote a seven-part series called Henderson's Boys, which takes place during World War II and explains how CHERUB was founded, following the path of a 12-year-old French orphan named Marc Kilgour who meets Charles Henderson and shows him how much help children can be to win the war. Henderson, following this, creates a small unit of children to be trained in espionage.

After its release in the United Kingdom, the novels have been released in the United States, New Zealand, and Australia, and have been translated into several languages including: Polish, French, Danish, Spanish, Russian, Czech, Norwegian, Estonian, and Portuguese. On his website, Muchamore states that over 15 million copies have now been sold. A film adaptation was hinted at in 2009, but no further information was ever given. In 2018, Sony announced they were developing a TV series based on the CHERUB books.

== Original series ==
The first series primarily follows James Adams, a 12-year-old boy who is later joined at CHERUB by his sister Lauren after their mother dies from drinking alcohol while on antibiotics.

=== The Recruit ===
After the death of his mother, James Choke joins CHERUB. With the help of fellow trainee, Kerry Chang, he passes basic training. Meanwhile, James' half-sister Lauren Onions joins CHERUB following the imprisonment of her abusive father, Ron. A couple of months later, James goes on a mission to Wales with fellow agent Amy Collins to thwart an attack on an oil conference by eco-terrorist group Help Earth.

=== Class A ===
Titled The Dealer in the United States and The Mission for 5,000 copies. James, Kyle, Kerry, Nicole, and mission controllers Zara and Ewart Asker help to take down the cocaine supplier gang KMG (or Keith Moore's Gang). They move into a house on the same estate as Keith Moore and his children. James' duty is to befriend the head of KMG's son (an often-used CHERUB tactic), Junior Moore, to attempt to get valuable information on his father's illegal activities. Things take an unexpected turn and a trip to Keith's holiday home in Miami is in order where members of a South American cartel attack the house.

=== Maximum Security ===
Many CHERUB missions have resulted in criminals being put behind bars, but one is now scheduled for James and Dave to bust someone out. James and Dave go undercover inside a maximum security prison in Arizona to break out Curtis Oxford, the son of an illegal arms dealer. Their hope is that Curtis will lead them to her, and reclaim stolen US Army missiles.

=== The Killing ===
James and Dave go to find out why a small-time crook called Leon Tarasov suddenly appears to become extremely rich, and they uncover a plot much larger than a robbery: the murder of Will Clarke.

=== Divine Madness ===
James, Lauren and Dana investigate a religious cult named The Survivors in Australia with suspected links to the eco-terrorist organisation Help Earth, while meeting a new boy named Rat, who's lived in the arc since birth.

=== Man vs Beast ===
James, Lauren and Kyle infiltrate a pro-animal rights terrorist group.

=== The Fall ===
The Fall
- Author: Robert Muchamore
- Language: English
- Series: CHERUB
- Publisher: Hodder and Stoughton
- Publication date: 15 March 2007
- Publication place: United Kingdom
- Media type: Print (paperback)
- Pages: 324 pp
- ISBN: 0-340-91170-0 (first edition, paperback)
- OCLC: 76361189

The Fall is the seventh novel in the series. It was published on 15 March 2007.

James Adams is undercover in the fictional city of Aero City in Russia, posing as the nephew of MI5 agents Boris and Isla Kotenkov, who are working to expose the illegal weapons deals of local oligarch Denis Obidin. The agents go to a meeting with Obidin, leaving James alone in their apartment. Later that night, the apartment is raided by the police, and James barely escapes. After several nights in hiding, James is picked up by a CIA agent also investigating Obidin, who shows James surveillance footage of the agents killing Obidin and then being killed trying to escape his compound. James makes contact with CHERUB and is successfully exfiltrated back to the UK. However, to his dismay, he is suspended from missions by Zara and Ewart Asker pending an investigation into the incident.

Meanwhile, Lauren Adams is on a training exercise under the supervision of Norman Large. After Large becomes inebriated and suffers a heart attack, Lauren takes charge to get medical attention for Large. Lauren is recruited for a mission to befriend Anna Chaika, a young girl who is suspected of having been smuggled into the UK by sex traffickers. Anna is tracked down by the trafficking ring, who kidnap her and Lauren and take them to a brothel. Lauren stabs one of the traffickers when he attempts to rape her, and the authorities raid the brothel after tracing Lauren's phone, freeing Anna and other human trafficking victims. Anna is granted British citizenship and adopted by a Scottish family.

Back on campus, James begins to fear that his CHERUB career will be ruined if his claims that the agents went rogue are not vindicated, especially after rumours begin to swirl amongst Kerry Chang and the other cherubs that James had blown the agents' cover. After unsuccessfully attempting to convince Kerry to help him sneak into the mission preparation centre and review Ewart's files from the mission, James breaks in alone. Reviewing the files, James discovers that Ewart was in possession of surveillance footage implicating the agents, contrary to Ewart's claims that he could not access the footage. James is caught by Dana Smith, who agrees to help James smuggle Ewart's files out of the control centre. Reviewing the files, James and Dana unravel the conspiracy: when Obidin's business partner Lord Frederick Hilton tried to end his dealings with Obidin, Obidin threatened to reveal the corruption of Hilton's son Sebastian Hilton, the junior intelligence minister. The Hiltons subsequently arranged the assassination of Obidin, as well as those of Lord Hilton's research scientist Clare Nazareth and personal assistant Madeline Cowell to prevent them revealing the truth. They realise that Ewart has left campus to meet with two other people with connections to the Hiltons: journalist Jason McLoud, who reported on Lord Hilton's business endeavours, and Cowell's housekeeper Sarah Thomas. James and Dana decide to follow Ewart to the meetings. They confess their mutual attraction and are caught in a compromising position by Lauren, who is returning from her mission.

While tailing Ewart, James and Dana witness private investigators placing a tracking device on Ewart's car. After Ewart leaves the meeting with Thomas, the private investigators attempt to kidnap Ewart and steal a file given to him by Thomas, only to be subdued by James and Dana. In the aftermath, it is revealed that Ewart had concealed his knowledge of the circumstances of Obidin's death to protect James from potential interrogation by MI5 and to prevent the Hiltons from discovering the extent of CHERUB's investigation. The file given to Ewart was evidence compiled by Cowell of the Hilton's corruption. CHERUB passes this evidence to McLoud; the Hiltons are subsequently arrested after McLoud reveals the scandal. Zara awards James and Dana their black shirt as gratitude for saving Ewart. James and Dana decide to begin dating, but back at campus they find that Lauren had told Kerry about them, disbelieving James' claims to have not been having an affair with Dana. When James and Dana try to explain the situation to Kerry, she begins throwing food at them, with the situation quickly deteriorating into a full-blown food fight in the campus cafeteria. James watches the scene unfold with bemusement, realising that the situation will grant him legendary status on campus.

=== Mad Dogs ===
James and Bruce infiltrate a gang tussling with rivals for control of the Luton underworld after the collapse of KMG. James rekindles his relationship with Junior Moore.

=== The Sleepwalker ===
James' sister Lauren and Jake Parker go undercover to befriend a boy who claims that his father is responsible for a deadly plane crash in the Atlantic. Meanwhile, James is put into an uncomfortable situation as he is forced to do work experience with his ex-girlfriend.

=== The General ===
After an uncomfortable break-up, James, Lauren, and other CHERUB agents join the SAS and play insurgents in a US army training exercise in Fort Reagen. However the odds are stacked against them and only a master plan from CHERUB instructor Yosyp Kazakov can win the war for the Brits. Kazakov and James also cheat casinos to win a lot of money using card counting.

=== Brigands M.C. ===
James, Lauren and Dante Scott infiltrate a violent biker gang called the Brigands M.C trying to incriminate their ruthless leader, known only as "the Führer" for arms dealing charges, and to avenge the deaths of Dante's family years before.

=== Shadow Wave ===
James turns down a final mission at CHERUB guarding a politician, instead helping his best friend and retired CHERUB agent Kyle Blueman to expose the politician's wrongdoings.

== Aramov ==
This series involves an almost completely new cast of CHERUB agents, centred upon Ryan Sharma. However, characters from the original series appear occasionally. The first three books focus on a mission to dismantle the fictional Aramov Clan. As of December 2016, five novels have been announced.

=== People's Republic ===
Ryan investigates (and befriends) a young boy called Ethan whose extended family are the leaders of a Kyrgyzstan-based terrorist group known as the Aramov Clan.

=== Guardian Angel ===
Ryan is tasked with destroying the Aramov Clan after Ethan is kidnapped by his uncle who seeks to take over the business. Ethan gets sent to Africa and gets treated poorly but escapes.

=== Black Friday ===
Ryan has to stop the biggest terrorist attack in U.S. history as Aramov operations wind down, and James Adams returns to CHERUB campus. Meanwhile, they must find a way to stop Leonid once and for all and it's up to James and Leonid's ex-wife and son to put a stop to the ruthless mobster before he disappears forever.

=== Lone Wolf ===
Ryan infiltrates a drug gang. Ning befriends Fay, a girl whose mother was murdered by the gang and may have vital information on how the organisation works.

=== New Guard ===
New Guard is the final novel in the CHERUB series. It features characters from both the first and second CHERUB series in one big mission to rescue two hostages from the Islamic state in a high stakes mission to end all.

== Short stories ==
=== Dark Sun ===
Released for World Book Day, Rat and Andy go undercover to befriend a boy whose father is a member of Dark Sun, a criminal organisation dealing in nuclear weapons technology. Chronologically, the story fits in between The Sleepwalker and The General.

== Other publications ==
=== CHERUB: Ultimate Edition ===
CHERUB: Ultimate Edition consists of a map of CHERUB campus, a biography of Muchamore, and the novels The Recruit and Class A.

=== The Recruit: The Graphic Novel ===
The Recruit was released as a graphic novel, illustrated by Ian Edginton and John Aggs.

== International releases ==
The CHERUB novels have been released in twenty-seven countries to date.

First publication date	Country
2004	United Kingdom; Australia; Canada; Ireland; New Zealand; United States
2005	Germany; Russia
2007	Belgium; China; Czech Republic; Denmark; Estonia; France; Netherlands; Hungary; Poland; Portugal; Switzerland
2008	India; Japan; Spain
2009	Romania; Sweden; Turkey; Serbia

== Setting ==
The series' main location is CHERUB campus, the headquarters of the fictional titular British government agency CHERUB for which the children work. It was formed during World War II by Charles Henderson; a British spy who had used children during an operation in France. It is populated by around 350 adolescents and children, who live on the campus when not on a mission to help the police. No one in the world knows where CHERUB campus is situated except its employees, members and certain police and high level members of the British government.

CHERUB began with a small number of boys which swelled in size as the government realised its worth. After several years of operation it took in a trial group of girls, which proved successful. Since then CHERUB campus has grown a significant amount, improving many of its facilities. The dojo was built on behalf of a successful operation that took place in Japan and the new mission preparation building was built by the chairman of the first 6 novels, Dr. McAfferty, better known as Mac. After retiring at the end of Man Vs Beast, he is replaced by Zara Asker, who holds the role for ten years until stepping down to be replaced by husband Ewart Asker shortly before New Guard.

After years of speculation, Muchamore said in the Henderson's Boys novel Eagle Day that CHERUB stood for Charles Henderson Espionage Research Unit B; this was later confirmed in Secret Army by Eileen McAfferty in a telegram.

== Characters ==
- James Adams is the main protagonist of the series. He is a strong, stocky boy ranging from just under twelve to eighteen years old through the course of the series. Although usually friendly, he does occasionally have anger management issues. During the series he has had two on-campus girlfriends, Kerry Chang and Dana Smith, as well as various girlfriends on missions. He gets on well with his half-sister Lauren Adams.
- Lauren Adams is James' sister. She is headstrong and does well in missions, however she does create various schemes to pay people back for actions, which result in her receiving punishments. She has a boyfriend called Rat.
- Kyle Blueman is another CHERUB agent who is friends with James. He was recruited when he was eight years old. He is gay, something that James has trouble coming to terms with. He is kind, but will also conduct revenge schemes, including one in which he exposes politician Tan Abdullah as conducting illegal activities in Shadow Wave, the twelfth book of the series.
- Kerry Chang is a James' main love interest throughout most of the series. She befriends James in the first novel and helps him get through basic training. She is also a Hong-Kong born karate champion.
- Bruce Norris is a CHERUB agent who is friends with James. Bruce is a small but very strong kid; he is a campus karate champion.
- Greg "Rat" Rathbone is about a year younger than James. He is Lauren Adams' boyfriend. He was recruited in the fifth book, Divine Madness.

== See also ==
- Eco-terrorism in fiction
