= Robert Muchamore =

English young adult fiction author (born 1971)

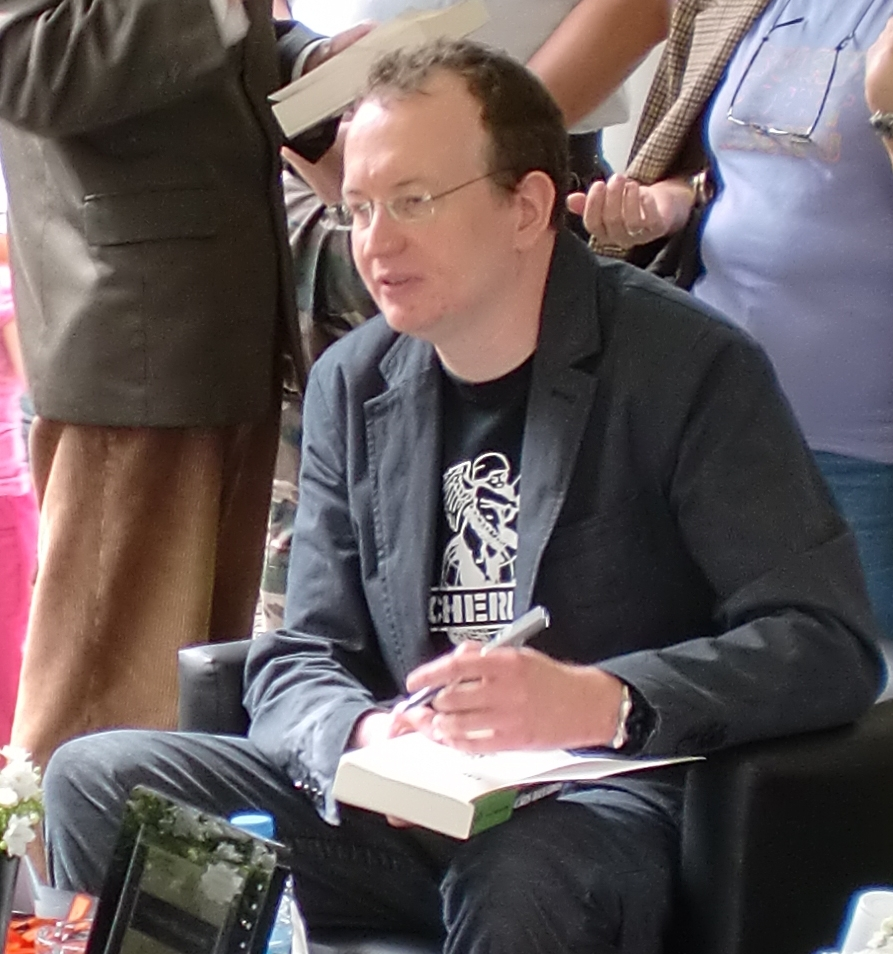
- Muchamore at a CHERUB book signing in Lisbon, Portugal (2011)
- Born: Robert Kilgore Muchamore; 26 December 1971 (age 54); Tufnell Park, London, England
- Occupation: Novelist
- Writing career
- Period: 2004–present
- Genres: Young adult; spy; adventure; thriller
- Notable works: CHERUB; Henderson's Boys; Rock War
- Website: www.muchamore.com

Robert Kilgore Muchamore (born 26 December 1971) is an English author of young adult fiction, best known for his CHERUB, Henderson's Boys and Rock War series.

== Early life ==
Robert Kilgore Muchamore was born in Tufnell Park, London, on 26 December 1971, and is the youngest of four children; his father was a milkman and his mother a cleaning lady. Muchamore grew up in Tufnell Park and attended St. Johns Upper Holloway and Acland Burghley School, leaving with a D in A-Level Economics and aspirations to be either an architect, photographer or writer. His first job was at an heir hunters firm called Fraser & Fraser.

== Career ==
=== CHERUB ===
Muchamore started writing the CHERUB novels because his nephew Jared, who lived in Australia, could not find any novels that he liked reading. He tried to write novels that he would have enjoyed reading when he was an adolescent, a time when he remembers being too old for children's novels but not old enough to read adult novels.

The CHERUB series follows the life of a character named James Adams (formerly James Choke) and his younger half-sister Lauren Adams (formerly Lauren Onions), a member of CHERUB (Charles Henderson's Espionage Research Unit B), a top-secret branch of the British Secret Service. The organisation recruits orphaned children and trains them as spies. Once qualified, they are used to investigate targets ranging from international terrorists to gang leaders. As children, they are considered innocent by their targets. CHERUB agents start basic training at the age of ten. Basic training is a gruelling, tiresome 100-day course that prepares CHERUBs for the dangers they could face during missions. CHERUB agents are then eligible for missions upon completion. Once they have passed basic training, agents take part in missions, before compulsory retirement at the age of seventeen.

Muchamore has written and published seventeen CHERUB novels and a World Book Day novella which combined have sold over 15,000,000 copies.

The CHERUB series has been sold in more than twenty countries and has won various awards. Most notably, The Recruit has won eight literature awards.

=== Henderson's Boys ===
Muchamore has authored a second series of novels about the origins of CHERUB entitled Henderson's Boys. The first, The Escape, was released on 5 February 2009 in the UK. Six novels followed, with the seventh and final novel, Scorched Earth, being released in February 2013.

The Henderson's Boys novels are set during World War II and follow Charles Henderson, a British secret agent, as he creates the organisation later featured in the CHERUB series. The novels centre around four children: Marc Kilgour, Paul Clarke, Rosie Clarke, and PT Bivott.

=== CHERUB: Aramov ===
The second series of CHERUB books is subtitled Aramov, so-called because the antagonists of the first three books of the series are the Aramov Clan. The first novel, People's Republic, was released in August 2011. Guardian Angel was released in September 2012, Black Friday was released in September 2013, and Lone Wolf was released in September 2014. The final book in the series, New Guard, was released in June 2016.

=== Rock War ===
In 2014, it was announced that Muchamore would be writing another novel, Rock War, which has no connection to CHERUB or Henderson Boys, except a cameo appearance by one character. It was published on 27 February 2014, and follows the story of Jay, Summer and Dylan entering a musical competition. A novella titled The Audition was released for World Book Day 2014. The second book in the series, Boot Camp, was published in October 2015. The third book in the series, Gone Wild, was published in October 2016, and the fourth and final book in the series, Crash Landing, was published in October 2017.

=== Robin Hood ===
In February 2019, Muchamore announced that he would be writing a new series, based on Robin Hood and set in the 2020s. The series is planned to span at least eight books.

Hacking Heists & Flaming Arrows, the first book in the series, was published on 2 April 2020. Piracy, Paintballs & Zebras, the second book in the series, was published on 7 January 2021. Jetskis, Swamps & Smugglers, the third book in the series, was published on 8 July 2021. Drones, Dams & Destruction, the fourth book in the series, was published on 3 February 2022.

Ransoms, Raids & Revenge, the fifth book in the series, was published in July 2022. The sixth book in the series, Bandits, Dirt Bikes & Trash, will be published on 9 March 2023.

The seventh book in the series will be published in July 2023; the eighth, in March 2024.

=== Other novels ===
Home is another novel written by Muchamore. It was deemed too violent to be published by any children's publisher that Muchamore approached, so it was never published. The story follows civil war in an unstated central African state, but most probably the Democratic Republic of the Congo. The full novel has been released by the author online.

In between writing The Recruit and Class A, Muchamore wrote a novel called Little Criminals. He posted the first two chapters onto the CHERUB series' official forum, to see what his fans thought. Unlike Home, Muchamore has not published the rest of the text on his fan forum because he still holds out some hope that it will be published.

Killer T is Muchamore's first standalone novel, and was published in September 2018. It is set in Las Vegas in the near future, when genetic modifications are commonplace. It tells a story bridging ten years of the lives of Harry and Charlie, aged 13 and 12 at the start of the book.

Arctic Zoo is Muchamore's second standalone novel, and was published in July 2019. It follows two teenagers living very different lives, and features themes of protest, sexuality, mental health and flawed leadership.

== Bibliography ==
=== CHERUB ===
1. The Recruit (April 2004)
2. Class A (October 2004; also known as The Dealer in the US and The Mission in the UK bookclub edition)
3. Maximum Security (April 2005)
4. The Killing (October 2005)
5. Divine Madness (April 2006)
6. Man vs Beast (October 2006)
7. The Fall (March 2007)
8. Mad Dogs (October 2007)
9. The Sleepwalker (February 2008)
10. Dark Sun (World Book Day novella; March 2008)
11. The General (September 2008)
12. Brigands MC (September 2009)
13. Shadow Wave (August 2010)

=== CHERUB: Aramov ===
1. People's Republic (August 2011)
2. Guardian Angel (August 2012)
3. Black Friday (September 2013)
4. Lone Wolf (August 2014)
5. New Guard (June 2016)

=== Henderson's Boys ===
1. The Escape (February 2009)
2. Eagle Day (June 2009)
3. Secret Army (February 2010)
4. Grey Wolves (February 2011)
5. The Prisoner (February 2012)
6. One Shot Kill (November 2012)
7. Scorched Earth (February 2013)

=== Rock War ===
1. Rock War (February 2014)
2. The Audition (World Book Day novella; March 2014)
3. Boot Camp (October 2015)
4. Gone Wild (October 2016)
5. Crash Landing (October 2017)

=== Robin Hood ===
1. Hacking, Heists & Flaming Arrows (April 2020)
2. Piracy, Paintballs & Zebras (January 2021)
3. Jetskis, Swamps & Smugglers (July 2021)
4. Drones, Dams & Destruction (February 2022)
5. Ransoms, Raids & Revenge (June 2022)
6. Bandits, Dirt Bikes & Trash (May 2023)
7. Prisons, parties & powerboats (March 2024)
8. Ballots, Blasts & betrayals (August 2024)
9. Fury, Fire & Frost (March 2025)

=== Other ===
1. Killer T (September 2018)
2. Arctic Zoo (July 2019)
