= Maximum Security (novel) =

2005 novel by Robert Muchamore

- First edition cover
- Author: Robert Muchamore
- Language: English
- Series: CHERUB
- Genre: Children's, Thriller, Spy novel
- Publisher: Hodder and Stoughton
- Publication date: 14 April 2005
- Publication place: United Kingdom
- Media type: Print (paperback)
- Pages: 304
- ISBN: 0-340-88435-5
- OCLC: 57380601
- Preceded by: Class A
- Followed by: The Killing

Maximum Security is the third novel in the CHERUB series of books, written by Robert Muchamore. In this novel CHERUB agents James Adams and Dave Moss infiltrate a maximum security prison in Arizona to get to the son of an international arms dealer.

== Plot ==
The FBI discover that Curtis Key, a 14-year-old boy imprisoned in an Arizona maximum security prison for murder, is the son of Jane Oxford, an international arms dealer who has evaded capture for decades. After Oxford steals missiles intended for the British government, British intelligence becomes involved in the hunt for Oxford. It is proposed that CHERUB send agents undercover in the prison to help Curtis escape, in the hope that he will lead the FBI to his mother. James Adams is recruited for the mission, along with Dave Moss, a well-respected CHERUB agent with a reputation for womanising. A third agent is required to assist the escape; James suggests his sister Lauren, who has just passed basic training.

James and Dave go undercover, posing as brothers incarcerated for running over a homeless woman while fleeing a robbery. On their first night in prison, Dave is injured in an altercation with prison officers, leaving James with the sole responsibility of breaking Curtis out. James wins Curtis' trust and the duo escape by posing as prison guards. After meeting up with Lauren, who is posing as James and Dave's sister, and evading the police, the trio make their way to the Idaho ranch of Vaughn Little, a former weapons dealer and associate of Oxford, to hide out while Oxford makes further arrangements. During their stay, James strikes up a relationship with Little's daughter Becky, to Lauren's disgust, as he is still dating Kerry. From there they are taken to Boise, where two of Oxford's henchmen give the three new identities. The henchmen explain that Curtis will travel to Brazil while James and Lauren will be given a new life in Canada. However, Oxford has planned to kill James and Lauren as witnesses to Curtis' escape, and after Curtis leaves for the airport with one of the henchmen, the other one attempts to kill Lauren, who successfully incapacitates him. Mission controller John Jones and the FBI follow Curtis, but instead of going to the airport, Curtis goes to an Oregon motel. Oxford appears, having come for Curtis in person, and is promptly arrested.

James, Dave, and Lauren return home to CHERUB campus. In the epilogue, Oxford refuses to co-operate with authorities and is remanded in ADX Florence, and is expected to face life in prison, though the missiles remain unaccounted for (Note: The later novel Black Friday reveals that Oxford had stolen the missiles on behalf of Galenka Aramov.). Little is also incarcerated, while Oxford's henchmen are sentenced to death after their past as contract killers is exposed. Curtis' sentence is reduced to 7 years after it is found that a psychiatrist took a bribe to recommend Curtis to the military school where the incident that precipitated his killing spree occurred. Lauren earns her navy shirt for her performance on the mission, Dave fully recovers from his injuries, and James, Lauren and Dave are awarded the Intelligence Star for their service.

== Critical reception ==
Maximum Security received better reviews than its predecessor, Class A and received two awards.

== Awards ==
Award	Year	Result
Cheshire Children's Book Award	2007	Winner
Portsmouth Children's Book Award	2006	Winner
Grampian Children's Book Award	2006	Runner up
Doncaster Children's Book Award	2006	Runner up
