= Charles Henderson (character) =

- Henderson's Boys character
- First appearance: The Escape
- Created by: Robert Muchamore
- Birth name: Charles Henderson

In-universe information
- Gender: Male
- Occupation: Spy
- Family: Joan Harper-Watt (spouse); Hayley Henderson (daughter - deceased); Terrence Henderson (son)
- Nationality: UK

Charles Henderson is a fictional character from the Henderson's Boys series by English author Robert Muchamore. He is the founder of CHERUB and member of the obscure branch of Naval intelligence known as the Espionage Research Unit.

== Background and life ==
Charles Henderson attended Burghley Road Grammar school, leaving at the age of fifteen. He worked briefly at a die-cast metal works before following his father into the Royal Navy. He served on several different ships and reached the role of Commander by his early twenties. He turned down two offers of Captain. Henderson's language skills - which were very advanced - meant that he was more suited to a desk job.

In 1935, he was transferred to the Espionage research Unit. In 1939, as World War II broke out, he was sent to Europe to liaise with resistance movements. In 1940 he was sent to retrieve Paul and Rosie Clarke, two British children in possession of valuable radio blueprints that the Nazis also wanted. In his mission to get to the children first, he enlisted the help of Marc Kilgour, a French orphan. After successfully evacuating the children to England with the radio blueprints, he realized how useful children could be as spies and so persuaded the government to set up CHERUB.

He was shot and murdered by his wife Joan for reasons unknown in 1946.

== Physical appearance ==
Henderson is above average height with dark hair. He has a slightly unkempt appearance but has good teeth.

== Academia ==
Henderson has an aptitude for languages; he speaks the five major European languages fluently and can mimic regional dialects accurately.

== Appearances ==
=== The Escape ===
Henderson is undertaking an operation in France. German agents are tracking two children, Paul and Rosie Clarke. He has to reach them before they do. He finds himself enlisting the help of Marc Kilgour, a French orphan. Paul and Rosie have the plans for a top-secret radio receiver which must be delivered back to England. Henderson accompanies them across France to Bordeaux where he sends them on their way. Henderson stays with Marc to get him a passport so that he can make the crossing

=== Eagle Day ===
Henderson has to contact the British Secret Service with plans of the German invasion of Britain. He takes a job as a translator for the Germans so he can copy the invasion plans. Marc also becomes a translator for the Germans and assists Henderson with the operation. Henderson returns to Britain at the end of the book announcing that staying much longer in occupied France would be a suicide mission.

=== One Shot Kill ===
Henderson is tasked with leading a team of CHERUB agents and an American sergeant into occupied France in an effort to stop the development of the V-1 Flying Bomb.

=== Grey Wolves ===
Henderson is tasked with commanding an undercover operation with 6 CHERUB agents. During which, his son - Terence Henderson, future chairman of CHERUB - is born and he is promoted to Captain.

== See also ==
- Henderson's Boys
- CHERUB
