= The Recruit (novel) =

2004 novel by Robert Muchamore

- First edition (UK)
- Author: Robert Muchamore
- Cover artist: David McDougal
- Language: English
- Series: CHERUB
- Genre: Children's; Thriller; Spy novel
- Published: 2004 (UK Hodder); 2005 (U.S. Simon Pulse)
- Publication place: United Kingdom
- Media type: Print (paperback)
- Pages: 342
- ISBN: 0-340-88153-4
- OCLC: 61439287
- Followed by: Class A

The Recruit is the first novel in the CHERUB series, written by Robert Muchamore. It introduces most of the main characters, such as James Adams (formerly Choke), Lauren Adams (formerly Onions), Kyle Blueman, and Kerry Chang. It was published in the United Kingdom by Hodder Children's Books on 30 April 2004, and by Simon Pulse in the United States on 30 August 2005.

== Plot ==
After the death of his mother Gwen from an accidental overdose of alcohol and pain medication, intelligent but rebellious eleven-year-old James Choke is sent to a children's home called Nebraska House; to his dismay, his half-sister Lauren Onions is sent to live with her neglectful father Ron. James' roommate Kyle Blueman is revealed to be an agent of CHERUB, a top-secret spy agency that uses children as its operatives, based on the principle that criminals do not suspect children of spying on them. James is drugged and taken to CHERUB's campus. Chairman Dr. Terrence "Mac" McAfferty introduces James to CHERUB and puts him through a series of entrance tests. James passes the tests and agrees to join CHERUB, changing his name to James Adams. However, before he can undergo basic training and become a CHERUB agent, James must learn how to swim. With the help of older cherub Amy Collins, James overcomes his fears and learns to swim.

James and seven other recruits begin basic training, a rigorous 100-day course designed to prepare CHERUB agents for missions. James is paired up with Kerry Chang, who was forced to quit her previous attempt at basic training due to a knee injury. Despite prolonged torment at the hands of head training instructor Norman Large, including being forced to spend Christmas night outside in their underwear and a grueling 3-day solo hike through the Malaysian rainforest, they both pass. James returns to campus to discover that Lauren has joined CHERUB as well after Ron was sentenced to prison for physically abusing her and selling contraband cigarettes.

Two months later, James is sent on a mission with Amy. Overseen by mission controller Ewart Asker, the two pose as the nephew and niece of a resident of Fort Harmony, a hippie commune in Wales. The commune is adjacent to a hotel that is hosting a conference of over 200 oil executives and politicians, and it is feared that eco-terrorist group Help Earth is planning an attack on the conference. James and Amy discover that Fort Harmony residents Fire and World Dunn and Brian "Bungle" Evans are Help Earth operatives, and are planning an anthrax attack on the conference. James is inadvertently exposed to anthrax during the investigation and is rushed to hospital, but is discharged after it is found he was only exposed to an attenuated strain that was being used to inoculate hotel staff. With the attack thwarted, Fire and World are arrested, but Brian manages to escape. For his exemplary job on the mission, James is awarded a navy CHERUB T-shirt.

== Development and publication ==
Development for both The Recruit and the CHERUB series as a whole began in 1999 when Muchamore was visiting his sister in Australia and found his twelve-year-old nephew complaining about the lack of any good reading material. In 2001, Muchamore began working on an unnamed novel, KN1 (Kids novel 1). This draft was more violent than the published version, with James slashing Samantha's face open with broken glass. Robert Muchamore didn't approach a literary agent until Autumn 2002. By this time the novel was called CHERUB 1.0. He was rejected by the first agent but taken on by the second. Many different publishing companies disliked the novel and rejected Muchamore once again. In March 2003, Hodder Children's Books purchased CHERUB 1.0 and an unnamed sequel, both for release in 2004.

=== Translation ===
The Recruit has been translated into 20 languages, including:

- Czech - Nováček (The Novice)
- Chinese - 愤怒的城堡 (Angry Castle)
- French - 100 Jours en Enfer (100 Days In Hell)
- German - Top Secret: Der Agent (Top Secret: The agent)
- Japanese - スカウト (Scout)
- Polish - Rekrut
- Portuguese - O Recruta
- Russian - Новобранец (The Rookie)
- Spanish - Entrenamiento Básico (Basic Training)
- Norwegian - Rekrutten
- Danish - Ilddåb (Firebirth)
- Dutch - Top Secret
- Hebrew - מלאך: הגיוס (Angel: The Recruitment)
- Turkish - Çaylak (The Novice)
- Hungarian - Az újonc (The recruit)

== Adaptations ==
=== Graphic novel ===
The Recruit: The Graphic Novel
- Author: Ian Edginton
- Illustrator: John Aggs
- Published: 2012 (Hodder)
- Media type: Print (paper back)
- ISBN: 978-1444903188

A graphic novel adaption of the book, adapted by Ian Edginton and illustrated by John Aggs, was released on 4 August 2012 by Hodder Children's Books.

=== Audio book ===
A 3-CD audiobook was released in the UK on 21 September 2006, read by Julian Rhind-Tutt.

== Critical reception ==
The Recruit received generally good reviews, and was nominated for eight awards, seven of which it won. The Sunday Express described the book as "punchy, exciting, glamorous and, what's more, you'll completely wish it was true".

== Awards ==
Award	Category	Year	Result
Red House Children's Book Award	Older readers	2005	Winner
Bolton Children's Book Award		2005	Winner
Medway Children's Book Award		2005	Winner
Bishop Luffa Children's Book Award		2005	Winner
Salford Children's Book Award		2005	Winner
Doncaster Children's Book Award		2005	Runner up
Sakura Medal		2007	Winner
Richard and Judy Best Kids' Books	Fluent 12+	2007	Winner
Kingston Young Readers Award		2007	Winner
