= 2007 in literature =

This article contains information about the literary events and publications of 2007.

== Events ==
- January 1 – Post- och Inrikes Tidningar (Sweden), the world's oldest surviving newspaper (begun in 1645 as Ordinari Post Tijdender), starts publishing online only.
- March 5 – A car bomb explodes on Mutanabbi Street in Baghdad, the city's historic center of bookselling.
- April 1 – The first in the Diary of a Wimpy Kid series by Jeff Kinney is released in book form in New York.
- April 26 – Polly Stenham's play That Face, written when she was 19, opens at the Royal Court Theatre in London, UK.
- July 21 – The final book in J. K. Rowling's Harry Potter series, Harry Potter and the Deathly Hallows, sells over 11 million copies in its first 24 hours, becoming the fastest selling book in history.
- November 2 – The Tomi Ungerer Museum opens in Strasbourg.
- November 19 – The first Kindle e-book reader is released.
- December 5 – The first European Book Prize is awarded to Guy Verhofstadt for United States of Europe.
- December 11 – Terry Pratchett informs fans online that he has been diagnosed with a rare form of Alzheimer's disease.

== New books ==
=== Fiction ===
- André Aciman – Call Me by Your Name
- Gilbert Adair – A Mysterious Affair of Style
- Alan Bennett – The Uncommon Reader
- Bob Burg and John D. Mann – The Go-Giver
- Michael Chabon – The Yiddish Policemen's Union
- Brock Clarke – An Arsonist's Guide to Writers' Homes in New England
- Bernard Cornwell – Sword Song
- Don DeLillo – Falling Man
- Junot Díaz – The Brief Wondrous Life of Oscar Wao
- Mikhail Elizarov – The Librarian («Библиотекар»)
- Steve Erickson – Zeroville
- Joshua Ferris – Then We Came to the End
- Ge Fei (格非) – 山河入梦 (Shanhe Rumeng)
- Helon Habila – Measuring Time
- Mohsin Hamid – The Reluctant Fundamentalist
- Han Kang – The Vegetarian (채식주의자, Chaesikjuuija)
- Elizabeth Hay – Late Nights on Air
- Khaled Hosseini – A Thousand Splendid Suns
- Hiromi Itō (伊藤 比呂美) – The Thorn-Puller: New Tales of the Sugamo Jizō (とげ抜き 新巣鴨地蔵縁起, Toge-nuki: Shin Sugamo Jizō engi)
- Denis Johnson – Tree of Smoke
- Panos Karnezis – The Birthday Party
- Andrus Kivirähk – Mees, kes teadis ussisõnu (The Man Who Spoke "Snakish")
- Jesse Lee Kercheval – The Alice Stories
- Torsten Krol – Callisto
- Min Jin Lee – Free Food for Millionaires
- Ian McEwan – On Chesil Beach
- Elizabeth McKenzie – MacGregor Tells the World
- Angela Makholwa – Red Ink
- Michael Ondaatje – Divisadero
- Tito Perdue – Fields of Asphodel
- Bahaa Taher – Sunset Oasis (واحة الغروب)
- Olga Tokarczuk – Flights (Bieguni)
- Zlatko Topčić – Safet Sušić
- Graham Swift – Tomorrow
- M. G. Vassanji – The Assassin's Song
- David Wong – John Dies at the End
- Kirby Wright – Moloka'i Nui Ahina, Summers on the Lonely Isle
- Corrina Wycoff – O Street
- Juli Zeh – Dark Matter

=== Genre fiction ===
- Joe Abercrombie – Before They Are Hanged (March 15, second of The First Law series)
- Christopher Barzak – One For Sorrow (August 28)
- Jim Butcher – White Night (April 3, Harry Dresden No. 9)
- Michael Chabon – The Yiddish Policemen's Union (May 1)
- Hal Duncan – Ink (February 2, second in The Book of All Hours series)
- Warren Ellis – Crooked Little Vein (July 24)
- Steven Erikson – Reaper's Gale (April 24, seventh in the Malazan Book of the Fallen series)
- Justin Evans – A Good and Happy Child (May 22)
- William Gibson – Spook Country (August 7)
- Ed Greenwood – Dark Lord (September, first in the Falconfar series)
- Tanith Lee – Piratica III: The Family Sea (third in The Piratica Series)
- Scott Lynch – Red Seas Under Red Skies (July 31, second in the Gentleman Bastard series)
- Richard K. Morgan – Th1rte3n (June 26)
- Ian McDonald – Brasyl (May 1)
- Chuck Palahniuk – Rant: An Oral History of Buster Casey (May 1)
- Douglas Preston and Lincoln Child – The Wheel of Darkness
- Risa – Battle of Demons (華鬼, Hana Oni, first print (book) publication, July 31)
- Lucius Shepard – Softspoken (April 15)
- Jeffrey Thomas – Deadstock (February 27)
- J. R. R. Tolkien (died 1973; with Christopher Tolkien and Alan Lee) – The Children of Húrin
- Catherynne M. Valente – The Orphan's Tales: In the Cities of Coin and Spice (October 30, second in the Orphan's Tales series)

=== Children and young people ===
- David Almond – My Dad's a Birdman
- Sherman Alexie – The Absolutely True Diary of a Part-Time Indian
- Robin Brande – Evolution, Me & Other Freaks of Nature
- Libba Bray – The Sweet Far Thing
- Suzanne Collins – Gregor and the Code of Claw (fifth and final Underland Chronicles)
- Catherine Drury – Ivan's Appeal
- Joseph Epstein, etc. – Literary Genius: 25 Classic Writers Who Define English and American Literature
- Charlie Higson
  - Double or Die (third in the Young Bond series)
  - Hurricane Gold (fourth in the Young Bond series)
- Dianne Hofmeyr – Eye of the Moon
- Nick Hornby – Slam
- Gordon Korman – Schooled
- D. J. MacHale – The Pilgrims of Rayne
- Richelle Mead – Vampire Academy (first in the eponymous series of six books for reluctant readers)
- Stephenie Meyer – Eclipse
- China Miéville – Un Lun Dun
- Robert Muchamore
  - The Fall (seventh in the CHERUB series)
  - Mad Dogs (eighth in the CHERUB series)
- Jenny Nimmo – Charlie Bone and the Wilderness Wolf
- Garth Nix – Lady Friday (fifth book in The Keys to the Kingdom series)
- Janet Nolan – A Father's Day Thank You
- Iona Opie – Mother Goose's Little Treasures
- Jerry Pinkney (adapted from Brothers Grimm) – Little Red Riding Hood
- J. K. Rowling – Harry Potter and the Deathly Hallows (final book in the Harry Potter series)
- Brian Selznick – The Invention of Hugo Cabret
- Hikaru Sugii (杉井 光) – Heaven's Memo Pad
- Laura Wiess – Such A Pretty Girl
- N. D. Wilson – 100 Cupboards (first book in the 100 Cupboards series)

=== Drama ===
- Hassan Abdulrazzak – Baghdad Wedding
- Bola Agbaje – Gone Too Far!
- Jacob M. Appel – The Mistress of Wholesome
- Sebastian Barry – The Pride of Parnell Street
- Jon Fosse – I Am the Wind
- Melissa James Gibson – Current Nobody
- Lee Hall – The Pitmen Painters
- David Henry Hwang – Yellow Face
- Tracy Letts – August: Osage County
- Caleb Lewis – Dogfall
- Tarell Alvin McCraney – The Brothers Size
- Hannah Moscovitch – East of Berlin
- Brendan O'Carroll – For the Love of Mrs. Brown
- Mark O'Rowe – Terminus
- Aaron Sorkin – The Farnsworth Invention
- Nick Stafford (stage adaptation) – War Horse
- Polly Stenham – That Face

=== Poetry ===
- Dejan Stojanović – Ples vremena (Dance of Time)

=== Non-fiction ===
- Peter Ackroyd – Thames: Sacred River
- Xurxo Borrazás – Arte e parte
- Andrea Cagan – Peace Is Possible: The Life and Message of Prem Rawat
- Umberto Eco – On Ugliness
- Edda Fabbri — Oblivion
- Wayne Federman, Marshall Terrill and Jackie Maravich – Maravich: The Definitive Biography of Pistol Pete Maravich
- David Halberstam – The Coldest Winter: America and the Korean War
- Ian Halperin – Hollywood Undercover
- Christopher Hitchens – God is not Great
- A. J. Jacobs – The Year of Living Biblically
- Linda and Terry Jamison – Separated at Earth
- Naomi Klein – The Shock Doctrine
- Arthur Kroeger – Hard Passage: A Mennonite Family's Long Journey from Russia to Canada
- Anthony Lewis – Freedom for the Thought That We Hate
- Lupa – A Field Guide to Otherkin
- John Matteson – Eden's Outcasts: The Story of Louisa May Alcott and Her Father
- Daisuke Miyao – Sessue Hayakawa: Silent Cinema and Transnational Stardom
- Haruki Murakami – What I Talk About When I Talk About Running (走ることについて語るときに僕の語ること, Hashiru Koto ni Tsuite Kataru Toki ni Boku no Kataru Koto)
- Ram Oren – ha-Shevu?ah (released in English in 2009 as Gertruda's Oath)
- Jessica Riskin – Genesis Redux
- Bruce Serafin – Stardust
- Kathy Stevens – Where the Blind Horse Sings
- Alexandru Tzigara-Samurcaș – Lupta vieții unui octogenar (An Octogenarian's Lifelong Combat; posthumous)

== Deaths ==
- January 11 – Robert Anton Wilson, American author and conspiracy researcher (born 1932)
- January 19 – Hrant Dink, Turkish-Armenian journalist (born 1954; murdered)
- January 23 – Ryszard Kapuściński, Polish journalist (born 1932)
- January 27 – Herbert Reinecker, German novelist, dramatist and screenwriter (born 1914)
- January 30 – Sidney Sheldon, American writer (born 1917)
- February 22 – Lothar-Günther Buchheim, German author, painter, and art collector (born 1918)
- March 2 – Henri Troyat, French writer and historian (born 1911)
- February 16 – Sheridan Morley, English critic and biographer (born 1941)
- March 30 – Michael Dibdin, British crime writer (born 1947)
- April 1 – Driss Chraïbi, Moroccan author (born 1926)
- April 3 – Marion Eames, Welsh novelist writing mainly in Welsh (born 1921)
- April 11 – Kurt Vonnegut, American satirical novelist (born 1922)
- April 23 – David Halberstam, American journalist and historian (born 1934| road accident)
- May 8 – Philip R. Craig, American author and poet (born 1933)
- May 17 – Lloyd Alexander, American author (born 1924)
- June 3 – Suzanne Robert, French Canadian novelist (born 1948)
- June 21 – Douglas Hill, Canadian science fiction author and reviewer (born 1935|injuries resulting from car accident)
- June 27 – Dragutin Tadijanović, Croatian poet (born 1905)
- July 31 – Margaret Avison, Canadian poet (born 1918)
- August 3 – John Gardner, British author of James Bond continuation novels (born 1926)
- September 3 – Mária Szepes, Hungarian novelist and screenwriter (born 1908)
- September 4 – Zenia Larsson, Polish-Swedish writer and sculptor of Jewish descent (born 1922)
- September 6 – Madeleine L'Engle, American novelist (born 1918)
- September 16 – Robert Jordan (James Oliver Rigney, Jr.), American fantasy and historical novelist (born 1948)
- October 19 – Jan Wolkers, Dutch author, sculptor and painter (born 1925)
- October 22 – Ève Curie, French author, daughter of Pierre and Marie Curie (born 1904)
- November 10 – Norman Mailer, American novelist, journalist and playwright (born 1923)
- November 12 – Ira Levin, American novelist, dramatist and songwriter (born 1929)
- November 19 – Magda Szabó, Hungarian novelist, dramatist and essayist (born 1917)
- November 27 – Jane Rule, Canadian novelist (born 1931)
- November 28 – Elly Beinhorn, German pilot and author (born 1907)
- December 22 – Julien Gracq, French novelist, critic and poet (born 1910)
- December 27 – Jaan Kross, Estonian writer (born 1920)

== Awards ==
- Nobel Prize in Literature: Doris Lessing

=== Australia ===
- ALS Gold Medal: Alexis Wright, Carpentaria
- Miles Franklin Award: Alexis Wright, Carpentaria
- Patrick White Award: David Rowbotham

=== Canada ===
- Canada Reads: Heather O'Neill, Lullabies for Little Criminals, Le Combat des livres: Denis Thériault, L'Iguane
- Dayne Ogilvie Prize: Michael V. Smith
- Edna Staebler Award for Creative Non-Fiction: Linden MacIntyre, Causeway
- Governor General's Awards: Multiple categories; see 2007 Governor General's Awards
- Hilary Weston Writers' Trust Prize for Nonfiction: Anna Porter, Kasztner's Train: The True Story of Rezso Kasztner, Unknown Hero of the Holocaust
- Rogers Writers' Trust Fiction Prize: Lawrence Hill, The Book of Negroes
- Scotiabank Giller Prize: Elizabeth Hay, Late Nights on Air

=== Europe ===
- Camões Prize: António Lobo Antunes
- Europe Theatre Prize: Robert Lepage and Peter Zadek
- European Book Prize: Guy Verhofstadt, United States of Europe
- Prix Goncourt: Gilles Leroy, Alabama Song

=== Sweden ===
- Astrid Lindgren Memorial Award: Banco del Libro

=== United Kingdom ===
- Caine Prize for African Writing: Monica Arac de Nyeko,"Jambula Tree"
- Carnegie Medal for children's literature: Meg Rosoff, Just in Case
- James Tait Black Memorial Prize for fiction: Rosalind Belben, Our Horses in Egypt
- James Tait Black Memorial Prize for biography: Rosemary Hill, God's Architect: Pugin and the Building of Romantic Britain
- Man Booker Prize: Anne Enright, The Gathering
- Orange Broadband Prize for Fiction: to Half of a Yellow Sun by Chimamanda Ngozi Adichie

=== United States ===
- Newbery Award for children's literature: Susan Patron, The Higher Power Of Lucky
- Compton Crook Award: Naomi Novik, His Majesty's Dragon
- Lambda Literary Awards: Multiple categories; see 2007 Lambda Literary Awards.
- National Book Award for Fiction: to Tree of Smoke by Denis Johnson
- National Book Critics Circle Award: to The Brief Wondrous Life of Oscar Wao by Junot Díaz
- PEN/Faulkner Award for Fiction: to Everyman by Philip Roth
- Pulitzer Prize for Fiction: to The Road by Cormac McCarthy
- Whiting Awards: Fiction: Ben Fountain, Brad Kessler, Dalia Sofer; Nonfiction: Carlo Rotella, Peter Trachtenberg, Jack Turner; Plays: Sheila Callaghan, Tarell Alvin McCraney; Poetry: Paul Guest, Cate Marvin

=== Other ===
- Friedenspreis des Deutschen Buchhandels: Saul Friedländer
- SAARC Literary Award: Mahasveta Devi

== See also ==
- List of literary awards
- List of poetry awards
- 2007 in Australian literature
- 2007 in comics

== Notes ==
- Hahn, Daniel (2015). The Oxford Companion to Children's Literature (2nd ed.). Oxford. University Press. ISBN 9780198715542.
