= Eye of the Moon (disambiguation) =

Eye of the moon may refer to:

- Eye of the Moon, a children's historical novel.
- The Eye of the Moon, a book in the Bourbon Kid series.
- The Eye of the Moon (The Lords of Midnight), an unpublished sequel to The Lords of Midnight videogame series.
- Eye of the Moon (Egypt), an Egyptian religious symbol also called the Eye of Hathor, the Eye of Horus, and the Eye of Ra
- The Eye of the Moon (song) a song from the 2014 album Mue by Émilie Simon
