= The Republic of Thieves =

American fantasy novel by Scott Lynch

- Author: Scott Lynch
- Language: English
- Genre: Fantasy
- Publisher: Gollancz (UK); Del Rey Books (USA)
- Publication date: October 8, 2013
- Publication place: United States
- Pages: 650 pp (Hardcover)
- ISBN: 9780553804690
- Preceded by: Red Seas Under Red Skies
- Followed by: The Thorn of Emberlain

The Republic of Thieves is a fantasy novel by American writer Scott Lynch, the third book in the Gentleman Bastard Sequence series. It details the continuing adventures of Locke Lamora and Jean Tannen, as well as Sabetha, Locke's previously absent love interest. The book was released on October 8, 2013, in the US and October 10 2013 in the UK and Commonwealth. It is published by Random House and Orion.

== Synopsis ==
The book begins with the first meeting of Locke and Sabetha, the woman that he has been in love with throughout the series and was first introduced in flashbacks in The Lies of Locke Lamora. Sabetha and Locke meet when they are still part of the child thief gang and she is charged with guiding him.

After this flashback, the scene shifts to the fallout from Red Seas Under Red Skies where Locke is dying and Jean is charged with helping him. Patience, of the Bondsmagi appears and offers the pair a deal. They can work with her faction of the Bondsmagi in order to rig elections in exchange for money and Locke's life. The catch is the fact that Sabetha is working for the other side.

From this point, the book switches between flashbacks concerning Locke and Sabetha learning from Father Chains and the present games between Sabetha and Locke.

== Plot summary ==
The book begins with the first meeting of Locke and Sabetha, the woman that he has been in love with throughout the series. Sabetha and Locke meet when they are still part of the Shade's Hill gang under the Thiefmaker and she's charged with making sure he and two other troublemakers do not get caught. After this, Locke falls for her but does not get to see her often. He stays awake at night looking for her. One day, Locke returns to Shade's Hill to hear from the older children that Sabetha has drowned and he will never see her again.

After this flashback, the scene shifts to the fallout from Red Seas Under Red Skies where Locke is dying and Jean is working to save his life. Jean brings each Physiker, or doctor, to Locke in hopes that they can save him. Jean kidnaps a physiker who has been unwilling to help. He is unable to help, but Locke and Jean soon have a party of thieves beating them due to kidnapping the physiker. Patience, of the Bondsmagi, appears after they have been beaten and offers the pair a deal. They can work with her faction of the Bondsmagi in order to rig elections, in favor of the Deep Roots Party, in exchange for money and Locke's life. They agree.

After agreeing, the Bondsmagi carry Locke to the ship to Karthain while Jean walks. Once aboard, they bring Locke to a special room where they will perform the healing. During the healing, Locke sees his dead associate, Bug, with blackened eyes warning him. The ceremony is finally complete and Locke is alive and hungry. The Bondsmagi are all extremely tired from helping. Afterward they learn that Sabetha is working for the other side, the Black Iris party, and has been there a few days.

When they arrive in Karthain, they play a number of childish pranks back and forth. Locke is tricked by Sabetha and he and Jean awaken on a luxurious boat. Locke and Jean barely escape this boat by cutting off a small boat and escaping to shore. After a multiple day journey back to the Karthain, Locke and Sabetha make a truce for the safety of themselves and Jean to prevent issues and ensure a good show for the Bondsmagi. The elections continue and near the end Patience explains to Locke and Sabetha that Locke may be an ancient Bondsmagus who successfully moved from one body to the body of a child. The cost of this was the plague mentioned in previous books. The final election result is 10 – 9 in favor of the Black Iris party. One of Locke's schemes plays out and a key Black Iris member changes his position to neutral making the final result 9 – 9 – 1.

Locke, Jean and Sabetha escape Karthain. Locke awakes in the night to find Patience there and Sabetha gone. Patience explains that Locke may or may not be the magus but she will not tell him. Sabetha has left after learning about this. Jean appears and Locke tells him he will respect Sabetha's wish for space and will only go after her if she would wish it.

The epilogue gives a story about the Falconer and his journey regaining power. The epilogue ends with the Falconer killing his mother, Patience.

== Background ==
This is the third book in the Gentleman Bastards series and it took the longest to write. Between the previous book and this one, Scott Lynch was diagnosed with depression and faced divorce.
