= Mark of Cain (disambiguation) =

The mark of Cain is a phrase that originated in the story of Cain and Abel in the Book of Genesis.

Mark of Cain may also refer to:

== Film ==
- The Mark of Cain (1916 film), an American silent drama film directed by Joseph De Grasse
- The Mark of Cain (1917 film), an American silent mystery film directed by George Fitzmaurice
- The Mark of Cain (1947 film), a British drama film directed by Brian Desmond Hurt
- The Mark of Cain (2000 film), a Russian documentary film directed by Alix Lambert
- The Mark of Cain (2007 film), a British television war film directed by Marc Munden

== Music ==
- The Mark of Cain (band), an Australian alternative metal band
- "Mark of Cain", a song by Therion from the 1999 album Crowning of Atlantis

== Other uses ==
- Mark of Cain (novel), a 1996 novel by Ram Oren
