= Such =

Such may refer to:

- Bob Such (fl. 1990s), Australian politician
- Alec John Such (1956–2022), American musician
- Peter Such (born 1964), English cricketer
- Such A Pretty Girl, a 2007 novel by Laura Weiss

== See also ==
- Screaming Lord Sutch (1940–1999), British musician
- English determiners and indefinite pronoun, for uses of the word such in English
