= Tova Mirvis =

American novelist

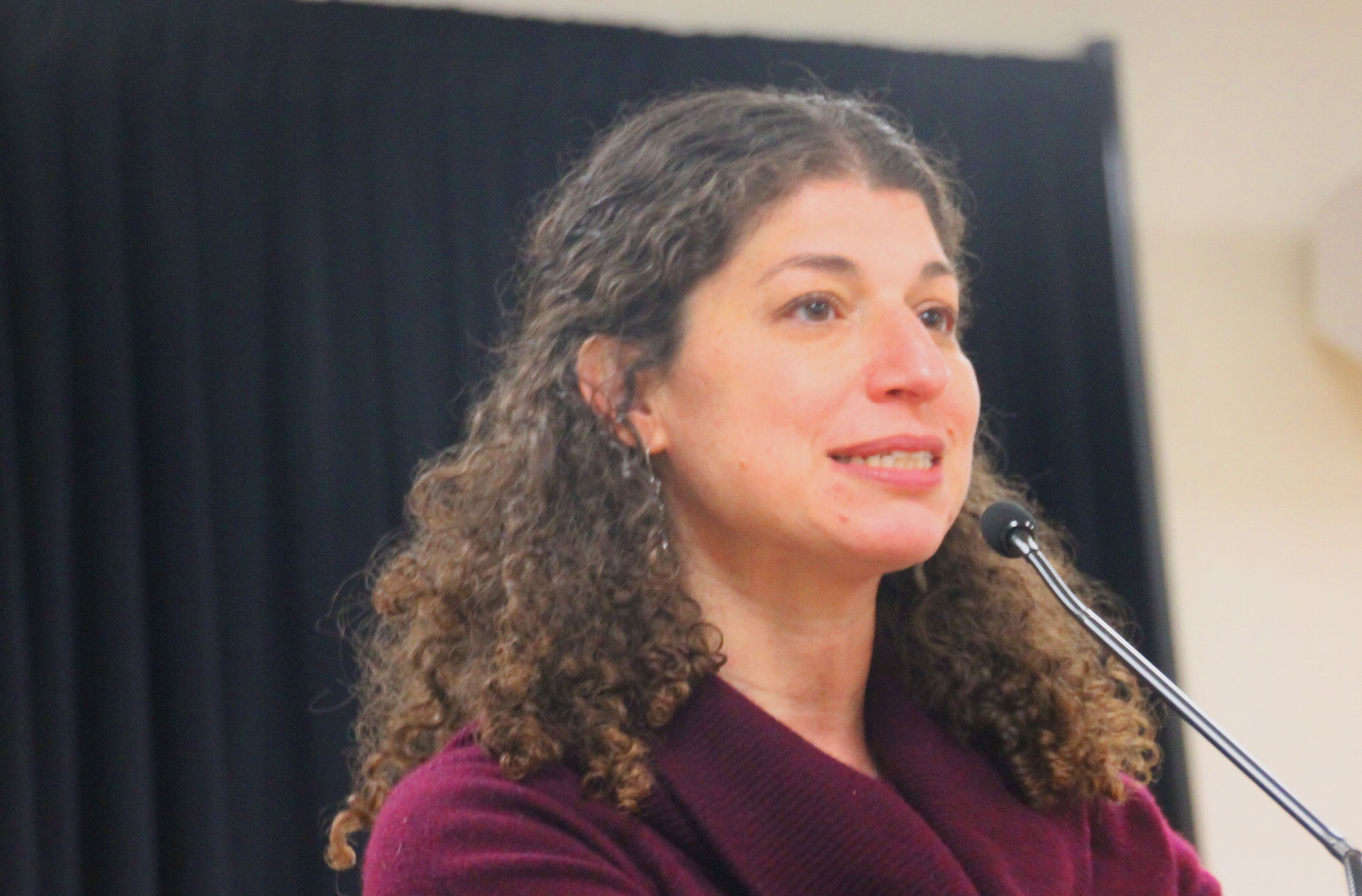
- Born: 1972 (age 53–54); Bethesda, Maryland, U.S.
- Education: Columbia College; Columbia University School of the Arts (MFA)
- Occupations: Author; essayist; memoirist
- Spouse(s): Aaron (pseud., m. 1997; div. 2012); William (pseud.?, m. ca. 2016)
- Children: 3
- Writing career
- Language: English
- Website: www.tovamirvis.com

Tova Mirvis (born 1972) is an American novelist. She is a graduate of Columbia College of Columbia University and holds a masters of fine arts degree in fiction writing from Columbia University School of the Arts. Mirvis' family has lived in Memphis, Tennessee, since 1874 when her German-born grandmother moved there at age two.

== Wendy Shalit essay ==
Mirvis was the subject of a 2005 essay by Wendy Shalit entitled "The Observant Reader" in The New York Times Book Review which accused Mirvis, an Orthodox Jew, of writing ostensibly "'insider' fiction (that) actually reveals the authors' estrangement from the traditional Orthodox community." Mirvis defended herself in an essay in The Forward.

== Writings ==
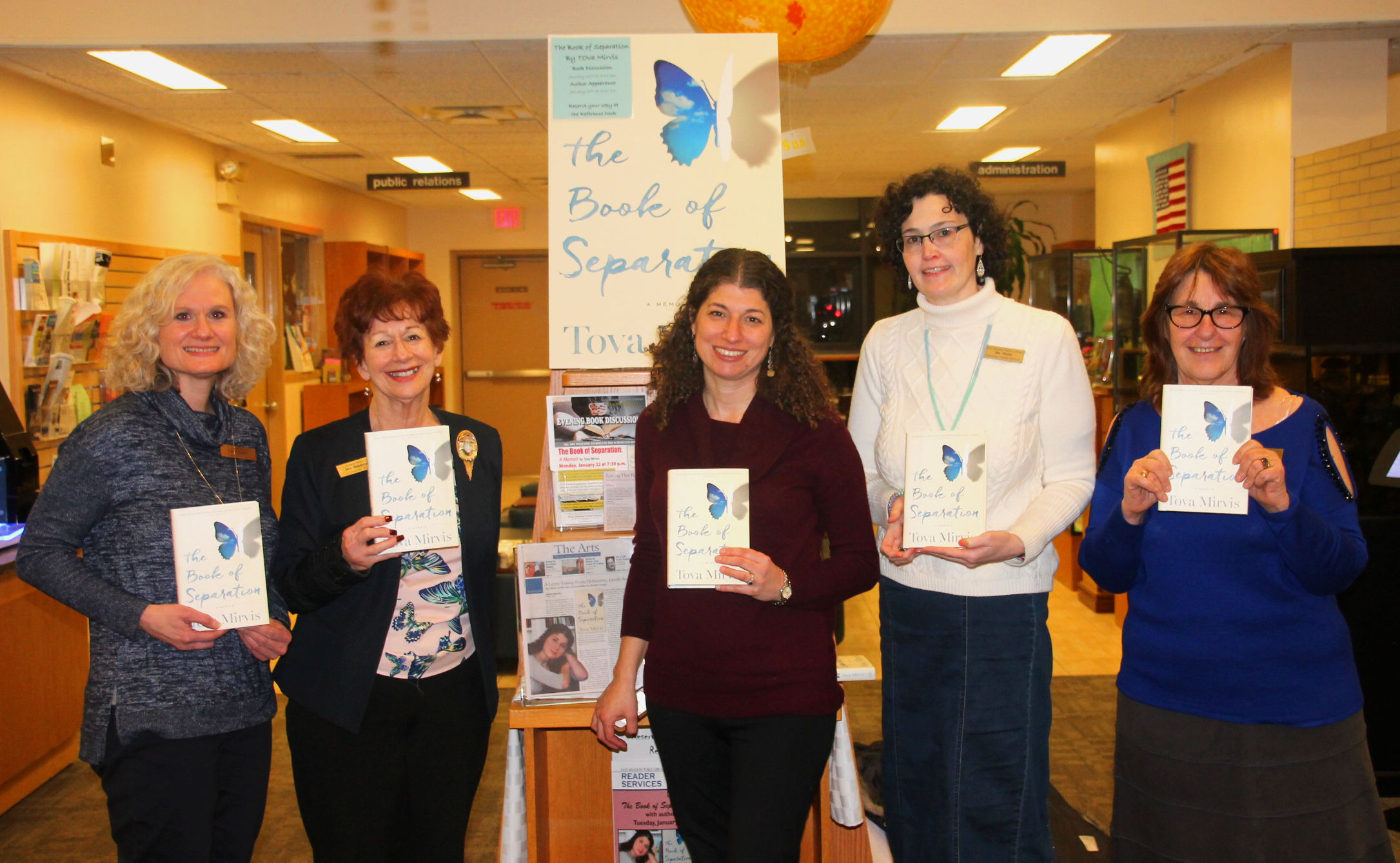
Tova Mirvis at the East Meadow Public Library, presenting The Book of Separation

Mirvis's published works include:

=== Books ===
Novels

- The Ladies Auxiliary. W. W. Norton & Company. 1999. ISBN 9780393078343.
- The Outside World. Knopf/Vintage. 2004. ISBN 9780307429124.
- Visible City. Houghton Mifflin Harcourt. 2014. ISBN 978-0-544-04774-7.

Memoir

- The Book of Separation. Houghton Mifflin Harcourt. 2017. ISBN 9780544520547.

=== Shorter works ===
==== Essays and other pieces ====
- "Finding God in a Hot Slice of Pizza". New York Times. September 8, 2017.
- "Made by Hand". Real Simple. September 2017.
- "When the Ground Cracked". Psychology Today. September 5, 2017.
- "After a Divorce, Spending Rosh Hashanah in the Great Outdoors". Tablet magazine. September 19, 2017.
- "A Lost Voice, Writer's Block, and a New Life". Literary Hub. September 19, 2017.
- "Out of the Mikvah, Into the World". Lenny Letter. September 19, 2017. Archived from the original on 2017-11-16.
- "Risky Reads: Review of 'The President's Daughter,' By Ellen Emerson White". National Public Radio. April 6, 2014.
- "9 Terribly Dysfunctional Marriages in Literature". Huffington Post. March 20, 2014.
- "Untamed novel, Untamed life," Beyond The Margins
- "Visible City". Campaign for the American Reader's Page 69 test. March 18, 2014.
- "The Books That Light Our Way". Book Riot. March 19, 2014.
- "To Outline or Not to Outline?". Grub Street. March 17, 2014.
- "7 Things I've Learned So Far". Writers Digest. March 16, 2014.
- Zeringue, Marshal (March 16, 2014). "Writers Read: Tova Mirvis". Campaign for the American Reader's.
- "Stained Glass: Tova Mirvis on what it means to be a Jewish writer". Jewish Book Council. March 14, 2014.
- "The City Below: Tova Mirvis explores parts of NY that are buried out of sight and how that relates to writing fiction". Jewish Book Council. March 12, 2014.
- "After Page One: The Journey". Literary Mama. March 10, 2014.
- "Divorced From My Husband, and My Faith". The New York Times. February 19, 2014.
- "From Somewhere". The Boston Globe. September 29, 2013.
- "In Praise of the C-Section – I'm not sorry I didn't have a natural birth". Babble.com. 2008.
- "Sophisticated Palate". Tablet Magazine. November 26, 2011.
- "Hard to Match". Tablet Magazine. August 5, 2009.

==== Stories ====
- Ulrich Baer, ed. (2002). "Potato Stories". 110 Stories: New York Writes After September 11. New York University Press. ISBN 9780814799055.
- Susan Stamberg & Murray Horwitz read Tova Mirvis's (November 26, 2013). Potatoes (digital file of broadcast reading). NPR's.

== Sources ==
- "Interviews and Profiles: Wandering a Long Way from Home". JBooks.com.
- http://media.www.touroindependent.com/media/storage/paper790/news/2006/01/01/Features/Tova-Mirvis.On.Balance.Motherhood.And.Moving.Beyond.Stereotypes-1308385.shtml
- "720 AM | Chicago's Very Own – Talk, News Radio – Sports, Traffic, Weather, Blackhawks, Northwestern, Listen Live – wgnradio.com". WGN Radio.
- http://www.exclusivebooks.com/interviews/ftf/tova_mirvis.php?PHPSESSID=of70o22c2grqpg9gf7tm74s5n0
