= Garbo Laughs =

2003 Canadian novel by Elizabeth Hay

Garbo Laughs is a 2003 Canadian novel by Elizabeth Hay. Set in Ottawa the novel focuses on Harriet Browning, a writer in her 40s who is obsessed with movies, and a group of her friends and neighbours who live in Old Ottawa South. The title references the 1939 American film Ninotchka which starred Greta Garbo as the titular character and used the phrase "Garbo Laughs" in promotional materials.

== Summary ==
Harriet Browning is a novelist in her 40s who has recently moved into a house in Old Ottawa South with her husband, Lew, and their two children Jane and Kenny. Harriet has trouble adjusting to life in Ottawa with her lone friend being her neighbour, Dinah Bloom, a life-long bachelorette and journalist who, like Harriet and her children, has an obsessive love of cinema.

Harriet receives a letter from her aunt, Leah, who informs her that she is writing a book on her deceased husband's life in conjunction with her step-son, Jack Frame. Both Jack and Leah decide to come to Ottawa as papers they need for their book are stored at Library and Archives Canada.

Harriet has an antagonistic relationship with her aunt, whom she used as material for one of her novels. She is nevertheless persuaded into hosting her and Leah's visit coincides with the January 1998 North American ice storm. Harriet has had a long held flirtation with Jack Frame and finds herself drawn to him once again. At the same time Dinah develops a tumour and her illness causes her attraction to Lew and Lew's attraction to Dinah to become more apparent to both them and their surrounding friends and family.

After a tree overburdened with ice falls and kills one of their neighbours, Harriet confronts Dinah about her relationship with Lew only for Dinah to tell her that Lew is only seriously interested in Harriet. Meanwhile, Jack tries to start an affair with Harriet and she rebuffs him.

Dinah convalesces and eventually marries Jack Frame, against Harriet's wishes. Dinah decides to move to Nova Scotia with him.

Harriet develops cancer and turns against movies. Shortly before her death, she reconnects with them once more thanks to Kenny.

The following year after her marriage to Jack Frame collapses Dinah returns to Old Ottawa South. When she re-encounters Lew, Jane senses romance between her father and Dinah.

== Characters ==
- Harriet Browning - a taciturn novelist in her 40s who has an obsessive love of cinema and secretly writes letters to Pauline Kael
- Lew Gold - Harriet's architect husband who is in love with his wife but also harbours a crush on their neighbour and friend, Dinah Bloom
- Dinah Bloom - a journalist a decade older than Harriet who falls in love with the Gold family and who also loves movies
- Kenny Gold - Harriet's younger son who is a sensitive adolescent who is obsessed with movies
- Jack Frame - The son of failed screenwriter Lionel Frame who has married multiple times and has a long-standing flirtation with Harriet
- Leah Frame - Harriet's aunt and Lionel Frame's widow who is combative and manipulative

== Reception ==
Garbo Laughs received mostly positive reviews. Quill & Quire called the novel "rich, lovely". The New York Times praised Hay's "fresh observations on the ebb and flow of love, the vagaries of female friendship, the power of the changing seasons". Publishers Weekly praised it as a "gracefully written novel".

== Awards ==
The novel was a finalist for the 2003 Governor General's Award for English-language fiction. It was the winner of the 2004 Ottawa Book Award.
