= The Only Snow in Havana =

- First edition cover of Canadian release
- Author: Elizabeth Hay
- Subject: Homesickness
- Genre: Non-fiction, book
- Publisher: Cormorant Books
- Publication date: September 1992
- Publication place: Canada
- Media type: Print (Hardcover & Paperback)
- Pages: 160 pp.
- ISBN: 9781897151273

The Only Snow in Havana is a non-fiction book, written by Canadian writer Elizabeth Hay, first published in September 1992 by Cormorant Books. In the book, the author chronicles an eight-year sojourn in which she traveled to Mexico, and through Cuba and Latin America, settling in New York until her return to Ottawa in 1992. Hay was homesick throughout her time away, and every new experience of her travels invoked reflections of home, which she recorded in her journal. Hay's journals resulted in a trilogy of books, of which, The Only Snow in Havana is the second.

== Awards and honours ==
The Only Snow in Havana received the 1993 "Edna Staebler Award for Creative Non-Fiction".

== See also ==
- List of Edna Staebler Award recipients
