= Jessica Riskin =

American academic

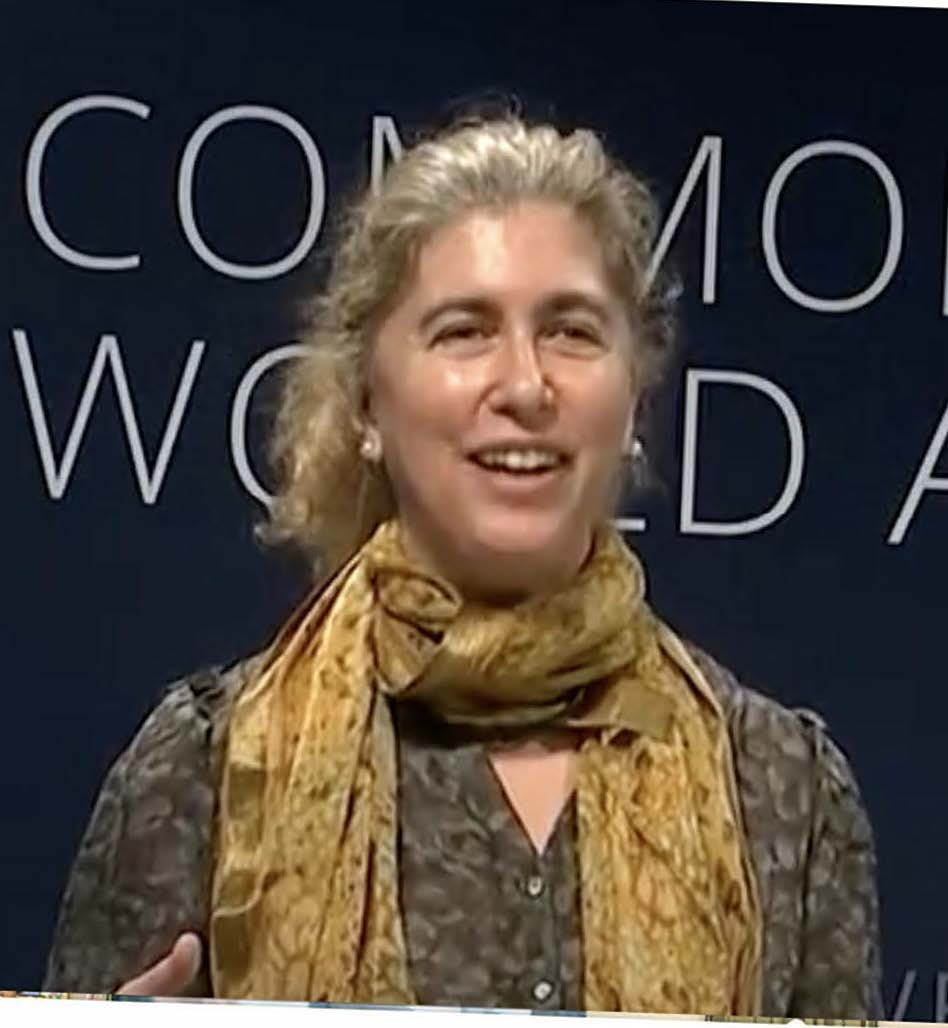
- Jessica Riskin at the Commonwealth Club, April 7th, 2026
- Born: September 7, 1967; New York, USA
- Education: B.A. History and Science; PhD History
- Alma mater: Harvard University; University of California, Berkeley
- Occupation: Historian

Jessica G. Riskin is a historian of science and is Frances and Charles Field Professor of History at Stanford University in the United States. She is a member of the American Philosophical Society, elected in 2026. From 2018-2024 she was the Jean-Paul Gimon Director of the France-Stanford Center for Interdisciplinary Studies at Stanford.

== Life ==
She grew up in New York City and is the daughter of literary critic Myra Jehlen and political economist and China scholar Carl Riskin. Riskin received her B.A. in History and Science from Harvard University, where she wrote an Honors thesis under the supervision of Stephen Jay Gould, and her Ph.D. in history from the University of California at Berkeley, where her dissertation advisor was J.L. Heilbron. In 1988-89 she studied at the Ecole polytechnique in Paris as an intern in the Centre de Recherche en Epistémologie Appliquée. In 1995–96, she held a postdoctoral fellowship in Science in Human Culture in the History Department at Northwestern University. She then taught in the History Department at Iowa State University and in the Program in Science, Technology and Society at MIT, where she held the Leo Marx Assistant Professorship in the History and Culture of Science and Technology from 1998 to 2001. She has also taught at Sciences Po, Paris, where she held the inaugural chair in Humanités Scientifiques in 2011–2012.

Riskin wrote the 2016 book The Restless Clock: A History of the Centuries-Long Argument over What Makes Living Things Tick, which was a pick for most influential book of the past 20 years in the Chronicle of Higher Education and is included in The Guardian's 2019 list "The Book that Changed My Mind" and has won the 2021 Patrick Suppes Prize from the American Philosophical Society. A Chinese translation was published in July 2020.

Riskin also wrote Science in the Age of Sensibility: The Sentimental Empiricists of the French Enlightenment, which won the American Historical Association's J. Russell Major Prize. She edited Genesis Redux: Essays in the History and Philosophy of Artificial Life and, with Mario Biagioli, Nature Engaged: Science in Practice from the Renaissance to the Present which was designated by CHOICE magazine as an "essential" book in 2013.

Riskin is the winner of the 2021 Patrick Suppes Prize from the American Philosophical Society.

She is a contributor to the New York Review of Books and the Los Angeles Review of Books, where in 2019 she published a book review of Steven Pinker's Enlightenment Now.

Riskin appears in passing as a character in Peter Carey's 2012 novel The Chemistry of Tears. This cameo appearance springs from her article "The Defecating Duck, Or, The Ambiguous Origins of Artificial Life," which appeared in Critical Inquiry in 2003.

Riskin was the 9th-place winner in the Westinghouse Science Talent Search for 1984. Her project in plasma physics was conducted at Columbia University under the supervision of Gerald Navratil, Thomas Alva Edison Professor of Applied Physics.

She is a member of the Editorial Board for The British Journal for the History of Science.

In 2026, she published The Power of Life: The Invention of Biology and the Revolutionary Science of Jean-Baptiste Lamarck.

== Books ==
- The Power of Life: The Invention of Biology and the Revolutionary Science of Jean-Baptiste Lamarck (2026)
- The Restless Clock: A History of the Centuries-Long Argument Over What Makes Living Things Tick (2016)
- Nature Engaged: Science in Practice from the Renaissance to the Present (co-edited with Mario Biagioli, 2012)
- Genesis Redux: Essays in the History and Philosophy of Artificial Life (edited volume, 2007)
- Science in the Age of Sensibility: The Sentimental Empiricists of the French Enlightenment (2002)

== Articles ==
- "Turtles All the Way Up" (review of Robert M. Sapolsky, Determined: A Science of Life Without Free Will, Penguin Press, 2023, 511 pp.), The New York Review of Books, vol. LXXII, no. 2 (13 February 2025), pp. 23–25. The reviewer, Jessica Riskin, writes: "Science can't prove there's no free will [Sapolsky's thesis is that there is no free will] because the question of free will is not a scientific question but a philosophical one. To misrepresent it as a scientific question is a prime example of scientism – of extending the claims of science beyond its bounds." (p. 25.)
