= Min Jin Lee =

American writer and lawyer (born 1968)

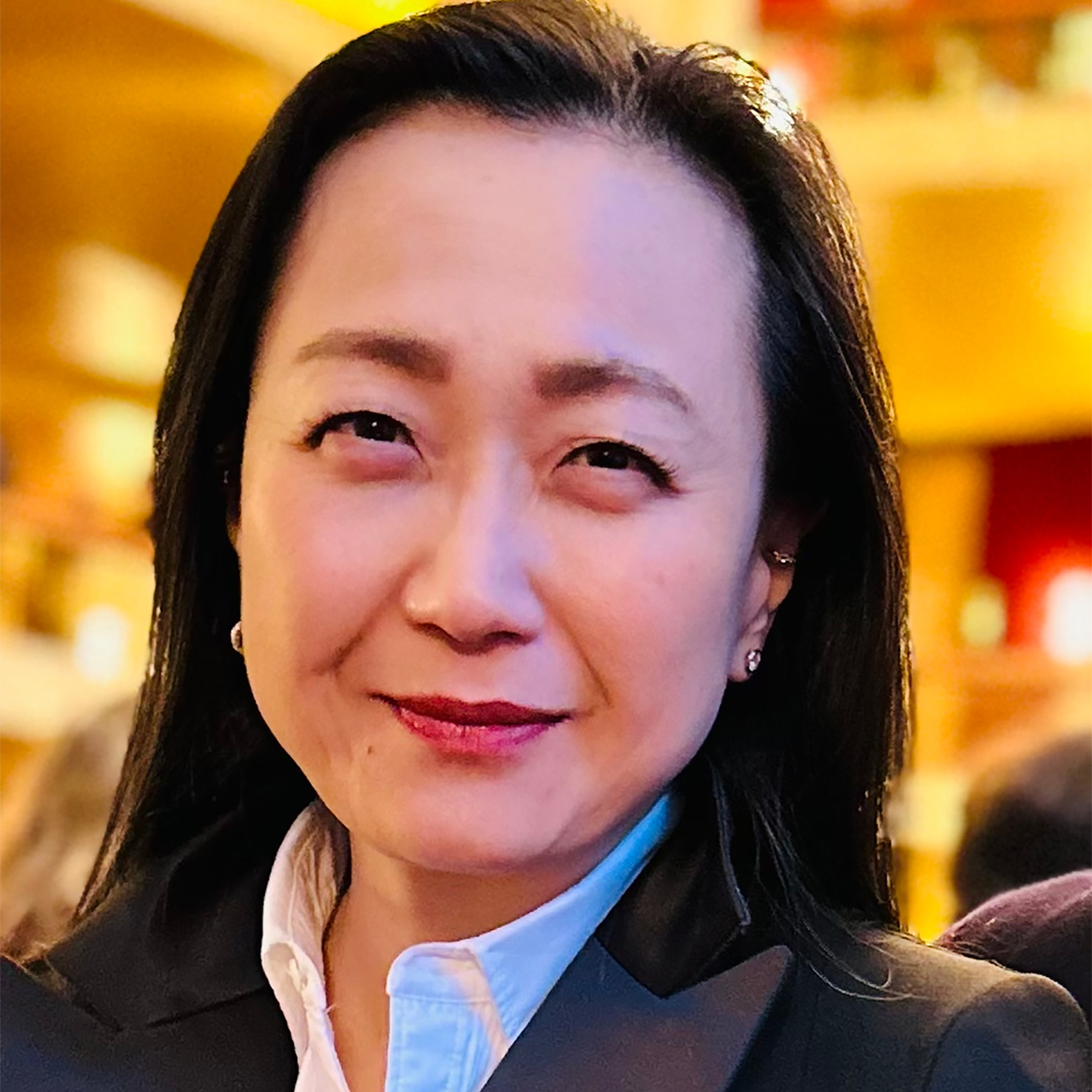
- Born: November 11, 1968 (age 58); Seoul, South Korea
- Education: Yale University (BA); Georgetown University (JD)
- Spouse: Christopher Duffy (m. 1993)
- Children: 1

Korean name
- Hangul: 이민진
- RR: I Minjin
- MR: I Minjin
- Website: www.minjinlee.com

Min Jin Lee (Korean: 이민진; born November 11, 1968) is a Korean-American author based in Harlem, New York City; her work frequently deals with the Korean diaspora. She is best known for writing Free Food for Millionaires (2007) and Pachinko (2017), a finalist for the National Book Award, and runner-up for the Dayton Literary Peace Prize. In 2019, Lee became a writer-in-residence at Amherst College in Massachusetts. Her third novel in her Korean quartet, titled American Hagwon, was released on September 29, 2026.

== Early life and education ==
Lee was born in Seoul, South Korea. Her family immigrated to the United States in 1976, when she was seven years old. She was raised in Elmhurst, Queens, in New York City. Her parents owned a wholesale jewelry store on 30th Street and Broadway in Koreatown, Manhattan. As a new immigrant, she spent much time at the Queens Public Library, where she learned to read and write.

After attending the Bronx High School of Science, Lee studied history and was a resident of Trumbull at Yale College in Connecticut. While at Yale she attended her first writing workshop, as part of a non-fiction writing class she had signed up for in her junior year. She studied law at Georgetown University Law Center, later working as a corporate lawyer in New York from 1993 to 1995. She quit law due to the extreme working hours and her chronic liver disease, deciding to focus on her writing instead. She has since recovered from the liver disease.

== Personal life ==
From 2007 to 2011, Lee lived in Tokyo, Japan. Since 2012, she has resided in Harlem. She is married to Christopher Duffy, with whom she has a son. Duffy is of European and Japanese descent; his great-great grandfather is Kabayama Sukenori.

Lee is a cousin of actress Kim Hye-eun.

In 2018, Lee stated that the works that most influence her as a writer are Middlemarch by George Eliot, Cousin Bette by Honoré de Balzac, and the Bible.

== Fiction ==
=== Short fiction ===
Lee's short story "Axis of Happiness" won the 2004 Narrative Prize from Narrative Magazine.

Another short story by Lee, "Motherland", about a family of Koreans in Japan, was published in The Missouri Review in 2002 and won the Peden Prize for Best Short Story. A slightly modified version of the story appears in her 2017 novel Pachinko.

Lee's short stories have also been featured on NPR's Selected Shorts.

=== Free Food for Millionaires ===
Her debut novel Free Food for Millionaires was published in 2007. It was named one of the Top 10 Novels of the Year by The Times of London, NPR's Fresh Air, and USA Today; a notable novel by the San Francisco Chronicle; and a New York Times Editor's Choice. It was a selection for the Wall Street Journal Juggler Book Club, and a No. 1 Book Sense pick. The novel was published in the U.K. by Random House in 2007, in Italy by Einaudi and in South Korea by Image Box Publishing. The book has also been featured on online periodicals such as the Page 99 test and Largehearted Boy.

A 10th Anniversary edition of the novel was released by Apollo in 2017. It was announced in January 2021 that Lee and screenwriter Alan Yang had teamed up to bring Free Food for Millionaires to Netflix as a TV series.

=== Pachinko ===
In 2017 Lee released Pachinko, an epic historical novel following characters from Korea who eventually migrate to Japan. The book received strong reviews including those from The Guardian, NPR, The New York Times, The Sydney Morning Herald, The Irish Times, and Kirkus Reviews and is on the "Best Fiction of 2017" lists from Esquire, the Chicago Review of Books, Amazon.com, Entertainment Weekly, the BBC, The Guardian, and Book Riot. The book was named by The New York Times as one of the 10 Best Books of 2017.

In a Washington Post interview, writer Roxane Gay called Pachinko her favorite book of 2017. President Barack Obama recommended Pachinko in May 2019, writing that Lee's novel is "a powerful story about resilience and compassion." The novel was also included on a reading list for Dua Lipa's book club through Service95 and, in May 2024, it was selected by Queen Camilla for her book club, The Queen’s Reading Room.

Pachinko was a 2017 finalist for the National Book Award for Fiction. In August 2018, it was announced that Apple Inc. had obtained the screen rights to the novel for development as a television series for Apple TV+. The series, consisting of eight episodes, premiered in March 2022.

As of 2023, Pachinko has been published in over 35 languages.

=== The Best American Short Stories ===
In 2023, Lee was chosen as the guest editor for The Best American Short Stories, an anthology of the best 20 short stories in fiction published the previous year.

=== The Great Gatsby ===
In honor of the re-release of F. Scott Fitzgerald's century-defining book The Great Gatsby, Penguin Classics approached Lee to write a new introduction to the novel. In this piece, she reflects on the "deep moral conscience" Fitzgerald inserted into his story and frames the novel not just as a tragic romance, but as a profound ethical inquiry into the American Dream. In an article for The New York Review of Books, Lee writes that "[a]mid a life of disappointments, Fitzgerald’s novel was a crowning achievement. I turn to it because it gives me the sober wisdom to revise my own American dream." Her introduction has been acclaimed by critics for its insightful perspective on class and race.

== Non-fiction ==
Lee has published non-fiction in periodicals such as The New York Times, the New York Times Magazine, The New Yorker, The Wall Street Journal, Times of London, Condé Nast Traveler, Vogue, Travel + Leisure, and Food & Wine.

For three consecutive seasons, Lee was an English-language columnist of South Korea's newspaper Chosun Ilbo's "Morning Forum" feature.

=== Reviews ===
Lee has written a number of reviews. In The Times, she has reviewed Toni Morrison's Home, March Was Made of Yarn (a collection of essays, stories, poems and manga made by Japanese artists and citizens in the wake of the 2011 Tōhoku earthquake and tsunami), Cynthia Ozick's Foreign Bodies, and Jodi Picoult's Wonder Woman: Love and Murder. In 2018, Lee reviewed Han Kang's Human Acts in an essay titled Korean Souls in The New York Review of Books.

=== Essays ===
Her essays include "Will", anthologized in Breeder – Real Life Stories from the New Generation of Mothers (Seal Press Books, 2001) and "Pushing Away the Plate" in To Be Real (edited by Rebecca Walker) (Doubleday, 1995). Lee also published a piece in the New York Times Magazine entitled "Low Tide", about her observations of the survivors of the 2011 Tōhoku earthquake and tsunami. She wrote another essay entitled Up Front: After the Earthquake in Vogue, reflecting upon her experiences living in Japan with her family after the 2011 Tohoku earthquake. Lee has also written two other essays in Vogue, including Weighing In (2008) and Crowning Glory (2007).

An essay entitled "Reading the World" that Lee wrote appears in the March 26, 2010, issue of Travel + Leisure. She also wrote an article profiling the cuisine and work of Tokyo chef Seiji Yamamoto in Food & Wine. She has also written a piece for the Barnes & Noble review entitled Sex, Debt, and Revenge: Balzac’s Cousin Bette.

Her interviews and essays have also been profiled in online periodicals such as Chekhov's Mistress ("My Other Village: Middlemarch by George Eliot"), Moleskinerie ("Pay Yourself First"), and ABC News ("Biblical Illiteracy or Reading the Bestseller").

Other essays by Lee have been anthologized in The Mark Twain Anthology: Great Writers on His Life and Works, Why I'm a Democrat (Ed. Susan Mulcahy), One Big Happy Family, Sugar in My Bowl and Global and the Intimate: Feminism in Our Time.

=== Lectures ===
Lee has lectured and spoken about writing, literature, and politics at numerous institutions.

When Lee was a Fiction Fellow at Harvard's Radcliffe Institute for Advanced Study, she gave the 2018–2019 Julia S. Phelps Annual Lecture in the Arts and Humanities. Her talk was titled Are Koreans Human?, which touched on writing her new novel and writing about the Korean diaspora.

In September 2019, Lee gave Amherst College's annual DeMott lecture, a welcome address for incoming students. The DeMott Lecture seeks "to expose incoming students to an engagement with the world marked by originality of thought coupled with direct social action, and to inspire intellectual participation in issues of social and economic inequality, racial and gender bias, and political activism."

As a part of the launch of MIT Human Insight Collaborative (MITHIC), Lee spoke at the event encouraging the attendees to view literature as a powerful tool meant to connect people. Within her conversation with The Boston Globe Media CEO Linda Pizzuti Henry, Lee emphasized the importance of putting "the human being at the center" and encouraged the attendees to "learn how to speak to each other again."

Lee was invited by Emory University in March 2026, as part of the Richard Ellmann Lectures in Modern Literature—a series that began in 1988—to speak on the theme "Can Wisdom Be Taught?" Over three days, Lee explored this question and drew sold-out crowds to her talks, including a creative conversation with professor Tayari Jones on the subject of "Writers and the World;" they spoke about how culture, geography, and politics inflect their work.

Yale University invited Lee to be the Class Day Speaker for the 2026 Yale Commencement. Her speech touched upon her time at Yale and how it shaped her. In addition, she urged the Class of 2026 to "choose the important over the urgent," and reminded the graduates that "time is our teacher," framing her speech using the Greek words for time: Chronos and Kairos.

== Publications ==
=== Short stories ===
- "Motherland" (2002)
- "Axis of Happiness" (2004)
- "The Best Girls" (2004) – re-issued in 2019 as a part of Amazon's Disorder Series

=== Novels ===
- Free Food for Millionaires (2007), Grand Central Publishing, ISBN 978-0-446-58108-0
- Pachinko (2017), Grand Central Publishing, ISBN 978-1-455-56393-7
- American Hagwon (2026), Cardinal Publishing, ISBN 9781549156397

=== Edited books ===
- The Best American Short Stories (2023), Mariner Books, ISBN 978-0-063-27590-4

== Awards ==
Year	Nominated work	Award	Category	Result	Ref.
2002	"Motherland"	The Missouri Review William Peden Prize	—	Winner	
2004	"Axis of Happiness"	Narrative Magazine Prize	—	Winner	
2017	Pachinko	National Book Award	Fiction	Finalist	
2018	Pachinko	Dayton Literary Peace Prize	Fiction	Runner-up	
2018	Pachinko	Medici Book Club Prize	—	Winner	
2022	Pachinko	Manhae Prize	Literature	Winner	
2022	Pachinko	Bucheon Diaspora Literary Award	—	Winner	
2022	—	Asia Society Arts Game Changer Award	—	Winner	
2022	—	Council of Korean Americans Award	Voice & Leadership	Winner	
2022	—	Samsung Happiness for Tomorrow Award	Creativity	Winner	
2023	—	Asian American Journalists Association Community Award	Visibility	Winner	
2023	—	Bronx High School of Science Atom Award	—	Winner	
2023	—	Great Immigrants Award	—	Winner	
2024	—	Fitzgerald Prize for Literary Excellence	—	Winner	

=== Other accolades ===
- Yale University Henry Wright Prize for Nonfiction
- Yale University James Ashmun Veech Prize for Fiction
- New York State Writers Hall of Fame, 2022
- Forbes 50 Over 50, 2022
- New York Foundation for the Arts Hall of Fame, 2019
- American Library Association Notable Book, 2018
- Frederick Douglas 200, 2018
- Adweek Creative 100, 2018
- Bronx High School of Science Alumni Hall of Fame, 2017

Fellowships

- Guggenheim Fellowship, 2018
- Harvard Radcliffe Institute Fellowship, 2018
- New York Foundation for the Arts Fellowship, 2000

Honorary doctorates

- Honorary Doctor of Humane Letters, Ursinus College, 2021
- Honorary Doctor of Humane Letters, Monmouth College, 2018

== See also ==
- Koreans in the New York metropolitan area
- Koreatown, Queens
- Koreatown, Manhattan
- New Yorkers in journalism
