= Jack Turner (author) =

American writer and academic

Jack Turner (born in 1942) is an American writer and academic. He was educated at the University of Colorado and Cornell University and taught philosophy at the University of Illinois. Since 1975, he has traveled in India, Pakistan, Nepal, China, Tibet, Bhutan, Peru, and Patagonia, leading more than forty treks and expeditions. He has lived in Grand Teton National Park for over twenty years and teaches mountaineering during the summers. He is the author of several books and essays. He won a 2007 Whiting Award.

== Bibliography ==
- Travels in the Greater Yellowstone. (Jun 12, 2007). ISBN 0-312-26672-3. Hardcover.
- Traces of an Omnivore, introduction by Jack Turner. (Mar. 1, 2006). ISBN 1-59726-110-6. Paperback.
- Teewinot: Climbing and Contemplating the Teton Range. (Nov. 10, 2001). ISBN 0-312-28446-2. Paperback.
- Teewinot: A Year in the Teton Range. (Jun. 8, 2000). ISBN 0-312-25197-1. Hardcover.
- The Abstract Wild. (Oct. 1996). ISBN 0-8165-1699-5. Paperback.
