= The Go-Giver =

2007 business book by John David Mann

The Go-Giver: A Little Story about a Powerful Business Idea
- Hardcover edition
- Author: Bob Burg; John D. Mann
- Language: English
- Subject: Business
- Genre: Self-help
- Publisher: Portfolio
- Publication date: December 27, 2007
- Media type: Print
- Pages: 144 pp.
- ISBN: 978-1-59184-200-2
- OCLC: 144767865
- Dewey Decimal: 650.1 22
- LC Class: HF5386 .B888 2007

The Go-Giver: A Little Story About a Powerful Business Idea is a business book written by Bob Burg and John D. Mann. It is a story about the power of giving. The first edition was published on December 27, 2007 by Portfolio Hardcover.

== Summary ==
The Go-Giver revolves around the story of a young professional (Joe) who is striving for success. Joe is ambitious, however lately it seems like his hard work and efforts are not paying off in terms of results. Following a disappointing quarter for sales results, he inadvertently seeks the mentorship of The Chairman.

Joe then embarks on a learning journey by meeting Go-Givers—friends of The Chairman. Through these interactions he learns of the "Five Laws of Stratospheric Success":

1. Value: Your true worth is determined by how much more you give in value than you take in payment.
2. Compensation: Your income is determined by how many people you serve and how well you serve them.
3. Influence: Your influence is determined by how abundantly you place other people's interests first.
4. Authenticity: The most valuable gift you have to offer is yourself.
5. Receptivity: The key to effective giving is to stay open to receiving.

== Reception ==
The book was ranked ninth on the 2008 Businessweek Best Seller list.

== See also ==
- Lifestyle guru
- Motivation
