= The Lies of Locke Lamora =

American fantasy novel by Scott Lynch

- First edition
- Author: Scott Lynch
- Audio read by: Michael Page
- Language: English
- Genre: Fantasy
- Publisher: Bantam Spectra (US); Gollancz (UK)
- Publication date: June 27, 2006
- Publication place: United States
- Media type: Print (Hardback & Paperback)
- Pages: 499 (US hardback edition)
- ISBN: 0-553-80467-7 (US hardback edition)
- OCLC: 65302306
- Dewey Decimal: 813/.6 22
- LC Class: PS3612.Y5427 L54 2006
- Followed by: Red Seas Under Red Skies

The Lies of Locke Lamora is a 2006 fantasy novel by American writer Scott Lynch, the first book of the Gentleman Bastard series. Elite con artists calling themselves the "Gentleman Bastards" rob the rich of the city of Camorr, based on late medieval Venice but on an unnamed world. Two stories interweave: in the present, the Gentleman Bastards fight a mysterious Grey King taking over the criminal underworld; alternate chapters describe the history of Camorr and the Gentleman Bastards, in particular Locke Lamora.

== Plot ==
The Gentleman Bastards are masters of deception, disguise, and fine cuisine. Father Chains, their "garrista" leader, is a priest of the Crooked Warden, the god of thieves. He buys troublesome youth Locke for his gang. Through a series of confidence tricks on the rich, they defy the Secret Peace, an unspoken agreement between the criminal underground and the Duke's government which allows for the existence of organized crime with the understanding that the peerage and the servants of justice are off limits. After Chains' death, Locke becomes garrista of the group, consisting of Jean Tannen, an expert fighter; Calo and Galdo Sanza, jack-of-all-trades identical twins; Bug, a young apprentice; and Sabetha, a master charmer who resides elsewhere during the events of the novel.

The criminal underworld of Camorr is ruled with an iron fist by the Capa Barsavi, who collects a commission on all criminal activity under his purview. Under Locke's leadership, the Gentleman Bastards are known as a small gang of gentrified but petty thieves and pickpockets, and their dues, though regularly paid, are relatively small. Secretly, the Bastards have actually been using elaborate schemes to swindle various nobles out of large sums, and have amassed a considerable fortune; they purchase the trinkets they pass on to Barsavi as tribute, in accordance with their small-time reputation. What little is spoken of their operations is credited to the shadowy "Thorn of Camorr".

Locke pretends to be Lukas Fehrwight, a merchant from Emberlain, to con Don Lorenzo Salvara and his wife, Sofia Salvara, who happens to be a gifted alchemist. Meanwhile, a mysterious criminal calling himself the Gray King has been killing Barsavi's most trusted garristas; fearing for his safety, Barsavi has sequestered himself in his ship-fortress, the Floating Grave. This has occurred much to the disapproval of his daughter, Nazca. To Locke’s surprise and misfortune, he is arranged by Barsavi to marry his daughter Nazca. Locke finds himself face to face with the Gray King and his hired Bondsmage "The Falconer", who somehow know what the Gentleman Bastards have been up to; Locke agrees to impersonate the Gray King in an arranged meeting with Barsavi in exchange for the Gray King's silence, as well as the Bondsmage's magical protection from Barsavi's wrath during the meeting. The Gray King murders Barsavi's daughter Nazca and delivers her body to the Capa in a barrel of horse urine; Locke is forced to continue with the plan, even though he knows that now Barsavi will never negotiate.

At the meeting, Barsavi manages to circumvent a disguised Locke's magical protection, having him severely beaten and left to drown in a barrel. Jean and Bug save him, but they realize that the Gray King has double-crossed them; they return to their secret lair and find their wealth stolen and the Sanza twins brutally murdered. An intruder kills Bug and nearly Jean and Locke, who swear revenge. Locke goes to the Floating Grave in disguise, where Barsavi is celebrating the Gray King's supposed death. Suddenly two of Barsavi's trusted bodyguards, the fierce Berangias sisters, turn on him and cut down Barsavi and his two sons. The Gray King whom Locke deduces is the brother of the Berangias twins appears, introduces himself as Capa Raza and claims Barsavi's empire as his own.

Left without resources and needing funds to somehow strike back at Raza, Locke tries to complete the con against the Salvaras. Meanwhile, Jean investigates the after-dark activity of Raza's minions and realizes that the new Capa is secretly loading his newfound wealth onto a ship supposedly quarantined for plague. Before Jean can tell Locke, he is ambushed by the Berangias sisters. He manages to kill both, but is seriously wounded himself. The Duke's "Spider", Camorr's secret spymaster who is actually the elderly Doña Vorchenza, has learned that the Salvaras are being conned by the mysterious "Thorn of Camorr." She and the Salvaras lure Locke to the Duke's annual celebration, and he barely escapes. Returning to their hideout, Locke finds Jean incapacitated by the Bondsmage's sorcery, which relies on the use of Jean's true name. Locke, whose real name is not known, overpowers the Falconer and tortures him for information. Wary of revenge by other Bondsmages should he be killed, Jean and Locke remove his fingers and tongue so he cannot gesture or speak spells, leaving him alive but insane.

Capa Raza has planned his revenge against Barsavi and the nobles of Camorr since childhood, when his parents were murdered as collateral damage from the Secret Peace. To destroy the peers, he gives the Duke of Camorr four sculptures, actually time bombs filled with a substance that will cause all of the nobles and their children present at the celebration to slide into permanent mindlessness due to the properties of a substance called Wraithstone. Locke races back to the tower from which he escaped and manages to convince Vorchenza and the Salvaras of the danger, and the devices are defused. He next coerces the Spider to set him free to kill Raza, and not put him on trial for theft as a reward for saving their lives. Vorchenza agrees when Locke has shared the location of the stolen money; he tells her that Raza has hidden his treasure on a waste barge, and instructs her to destroy the plague ship and its crew before Raza can use it to infect the city. Locke faces Raza in mortal combat even though he is outmatched by the Capa's skills with a sword, and is nearly killed before managing to distract Raza for the split second he needs to finally slay him. When no treasure is found on the barge, Vorchenza realizes that the Thorn tricked her into destroying the ship filled with Raza's fortune, which is now an offering to the god of thieves for Locke's murdered friends. Later, Jean and Locke, recovering from their injuries, sail away to a new life.

== Characters ==
- Locke Lamora: a headstrong orphan turned con man, the current leader of the Gentleman Bastards
- Jean Tannen: a hatchet-wielding member of the Gentleman Bastards with a relatively gentle disposition, Locke's closest friend
- Father Chains: the mentor and former leader of the Gentleman Bastards
- Calo and Galdo Sanza: members of the Gentleman Bastards, humorous and debaucherous twins with a broad skill set
- Bug: the youngest member of the Gentleman Bastards, Locke's apprentice

== Adaptation ==
Warner Bros. bought the film rights soon after the book's release in 2006. Brothers Kevin and Dan Hageman were to write the screenplay, with Michael De Luca and Julie Yorn to produce. However, the film rights lapsed in April 2010.

== Awards and nominations ==
The Lies of Locke Lamora received several nominations throughout 2007, resulting in four award nominations and two finalist award positions. The novel also won the SF Site Readers' Choice Award in 2006, with the second book in the series Red Seas Under Red Skies receiving ninth place the following year.

Year	Award	Category	Result	Ref
2007	August Derleth Award	Best Novel	Nominated	
2007	Compton Crook Stephen Tall Memorial Award	Best First Novel	Finalist	
2007	Locus Award	Best First Novel	Nominated	
2007	William L. Crawford - IAFA Fantasy Award	Best First Fantasy Book	Finalist	
2007	World Fantasy Award	Best Novel	Nominated	
2007	I Xatafi-Cyberdark Literary Award	Best Foreign Book	Nominated	
2006	SF Site Readers' Choice Award	SF/Fantasy Book	Winner	
