= A Father's Day Thank You =

Children's picture book

- Author: Janet Nolan
- Illustrator: Kathi Ember
- Language: English
- Genre: Children's Picture book
- Published: 2007 (Albert Whitman & Company)
- Publication place: USA
- Media type: Print (hardback)
- Pages: 32 (unpaginated)
- ISBN: 9780807522912
- OCLC: 71004001

A Father's Day Thank You is a 2007 children's picture book by Janet Nolan and illustrated by Kathi Ember. It is about Harvey, a bear cub, who, unlike his siblings, does not know what to give his dad for Father's Day until receiving all sorts of help from him comes up with a card of appreciation.

== Reception ==
A review in Booklist of A Father's Day Thank You wrote "Ember elevates the cuddly factor by depicting the family members as clothed bears in settings and situations kids will recognize.", and School Library Journal called it "An endearing story that will charm readers.".

A Father's Day Thank You has also been reviewed by Kirkus Reviews, and Horn Book Guides
