= Elizabeth Hay (novelist) =

Canadian novelist and short story writer (born 1951)

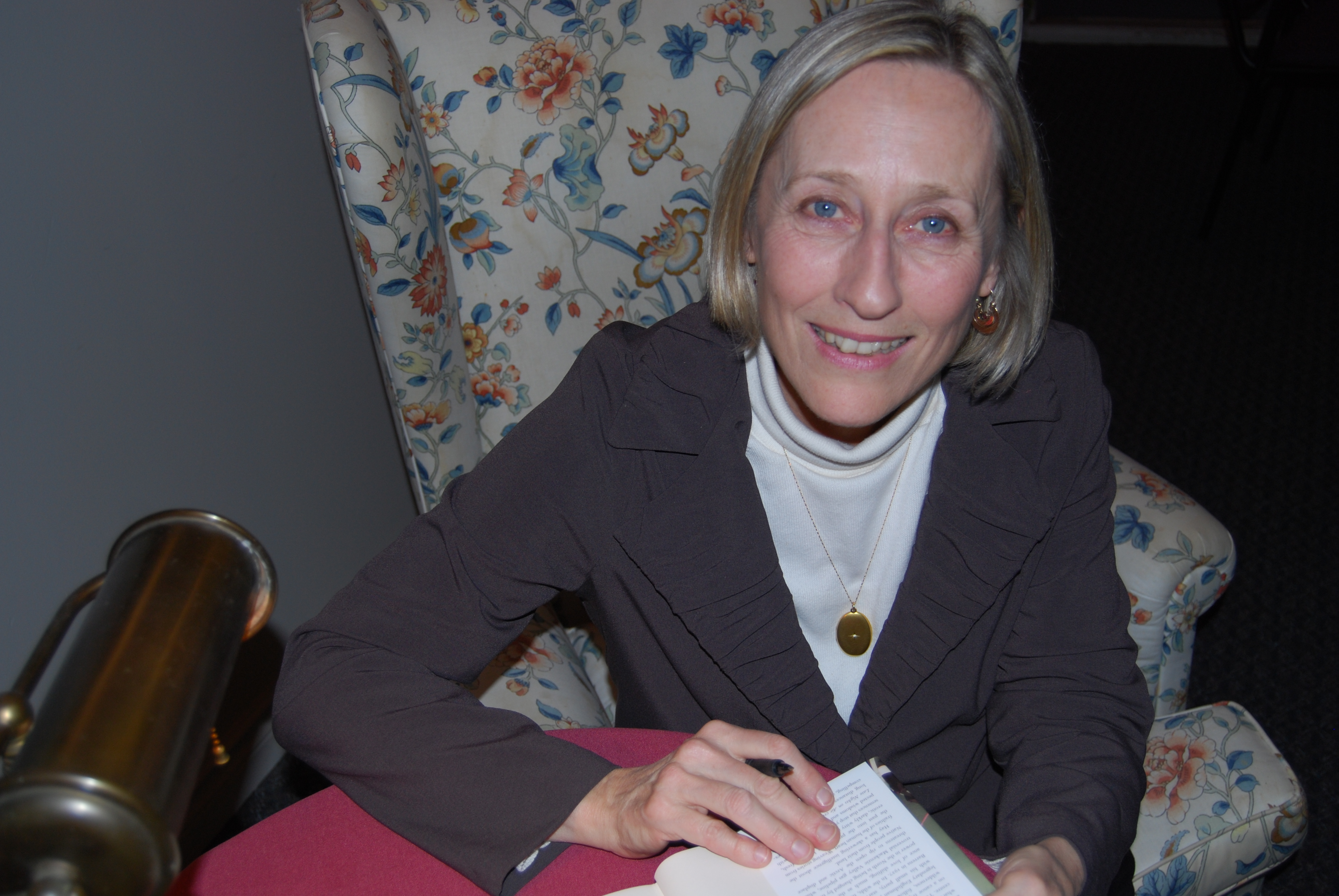
- Elizabeth Hay signing her book Late Nights on Air at the Port Colborne Author Series
- Born: October 22, 1951 (age 74); Owen Sound, Ontario, Canada
- Education: University of Toronto
- Occupations: novelist and short story writer
- Writing career
- Period: contemporary
- Genre: fiction
- Notable works: Late Nights on Air, A Student of Weather, Small Change, Garbo Laughs, Alone in the Classroom, His Whole Life, All Things Consoled
- Website: elizabethhay.com

Elizabeth Grace Hay (born October 22, 1951) is a Canadian novelist and short story writer.

Her 2007 novel Late Nights on Air won the Giller Prize. Her first novel A Student of Weather (2000) was a finalist for the Giller Prize and won the CAA MOSAID Technologies Award for Fiction and the TORGI Award. She has been a finalist for the Governor General's Award twice, for her short-story collection Small Change in 1997 and her novel Garbo Laughs in 2003. His Whole Life (2015) was shortlisted for the Rogers Writers' Trust Fiction Prize. Hay's memoir about the last years of her parents' lives, All Things Consoled, won the 2018 Hilary Weston Writers' Trust Prize for Nonfiction. Her most recent novel, Snow Road Station, was named one of the best books of 2023 by The New Yorker.

In 2002, she received the Marian Engel Award, presented by the Writers' Trust of Canada to an established female writer for her body of work — including novels, short fiction, and creative non-fiction.

== Life ==
Hay was born on October 22, 1951, in Owen Sound, Ontario. She is the daughter of a high school principal and a painter. Hayspent a year in England when she was fifteen and later attended Victoria College at the University of Toronto.

In September, 1972, she quit university. A few months later, May travelled out west by train. The following year she returned to Toronto and finished her degree in English and Philosophy. In 1974, May moved to Yellowknife, Northwest Territoriesm She worked for ten years as a CBC radio broadcaster in Yellowknife, Winnipeg and Toronto and then moved to Mexico, where she freelanced for the CBC. In 1986, May settled in New York City before to Canada with her family in 1992. She lives in Ottawa with her husband Mark Fried, a literary translator. May has two children.

== Critical reputation and style ==
In an interview with the CBC in 2007, Hay commented on the relationship between her writing and her career in radio. "When I worked in Yellowknife," she said, "I was writing poetry and stories on the side and not getting very far. I felt kind of schizophrenic, like my radio work was one type of thing and my writing was another and there was a gap between. That became even more pronounced when I started working for CBC's Sunday Morning, doing radio documentaries. I took me a while to realize that there didn't need to be such a wide gap between those two forms of writing, and that they could cross-fertilize. Good radio writing is similar to any good writing. It's direct and economical and intimate and full of detail. Also, it sets your visual imagination working."

== Bibliography ==
=== Novels ===
- A Student of Weather (2000) McClelland & Stewart ISBN 0-7710-3789-9
- Garbo Laughs (2003) McClelland & Stewart
- Late Nights on Air (2007) McClelland & Stewart
- Alone in the Classroom (2011) McClelland & Stewart
- His Whole Life (2015) McClelland & Stewart
- Snow Road Station (2023) Knopf Canada

=== Short story collections ===
- Small Change (1997) The Porcupine's Quill (republished by McClelland & Stewart in 2000)

=== Short stories ===
- "The Friend" (in The Penguin Book of Canadian Short Stories, edited by Jane Urquhart, 2007, Penguin Canada)
- "Jet in England", Ottawa Magazine summer fiction issue, Jul/Aug 2007
- "The Food of Love", Ottawa Citizen, Holiday Edition, 2008
- "Of Mattresses and Men", Ottawa Magazine summer fiction issue, July/Aug 2008
- "Last Poems", The New Quarterly, Spring 2009
- "City as Redhead", The New Quarterly, Spring 2009

=== Non-fiction ===
- A non-fiction trilogy about Elizabeth Hay's travels outside of Canada:
  - Crossing the Snow Line (1989) Black Moss Press
  - The Only Snow in Havana (1992) Cormorant Books
  - Captivity Tales: Canadians in New York (1993) New Star Books
- All Things Consoled: a daughter's memoir (2018) McClelland & Stewart

=== Essays ===
- "Ten Beauty Tips You Never Asked For" (in Dropped Threads 2, edited by Carol Shields and Marjorie Anderson, 2003, Vintage Canada)
- "The Most Fearless Book I Read" (in The Book I Read, edited by Peder Zane, 2004, Norton)
- "My Debt to D.H. Lawrence" (in Writing Life: Celebrated Canadian and International Authors on Writing and Life, edited by Constance Rooke, 2006, McClelland & Stewart)
- "Between Books" (in Finding the Words: Writers on Inspiration, Desire, War, Celebrity, Exile, and Breaking the Rules, edited by Jared Bland, 2011, McClelland & Stewart)
- "The Mother as Material" (in The Cambridge Companion to Alice Munro, edited by David Staines, 2016, Cambridge UP)

=== Anthologies ===
- Short Fiction, an Anthology, edited by Rosemary Sullivan and Mark Levene, Oxford University Press, 2003
- The Scotiabank Giller Prize 15 Years: An Anthology of Prize-Winning Canadian Fiction, Penguin, 2008
- Best Canadian Essays 2010, Tightrope Books, 2010

== Prizes and honours ==
- 1993 Co-Winner, Edna Staebler Award for Creative Non-Fiction (for The Only Snow in Havana)
- 1997 Finalist, Governor General's Award for Fiction (for Small Change)
- 1997 Finalist, Rogers Communication Writers' Trust Fiction Prize (for Small Change)
- 1997 Finalist, Trillium Book Award (for Small Change)
- 2000 CAA MOSAID Technologies Award for Fiction
- 2000 Finalist, Giller Prize (for A Student of Weather)
- 2000 Finalist, Ottawa Book Award (for A Student of Weather)
- 2000 TORGI Award
- 2002 Marian Engel Award (Writers' Trust of Canada)
- 2003 Finalist, Governor-General's Award for Fiction (for A Student of Weather)
- 2003 Ottawa Book Award (for Garbo Laughs)
- 2007 Giller Prize (for Late Nights on Air)
- 2009 Nominated, IMPAC Dublin Literary Award
- 2012 Diamond Jubilee Medal
- 2015 Finalist, Rogers Writers' Trust Fiction Prize
- 2015 Finalist, Ottawa Book Award
- 2018 Hilary Weston Writers' Trust Prize for Nonfiction (for All Things Consoled)
