= Brock Clarke =

American writer

- Born: November 16, 1968 (age 57); Massachusetts, U.S.
- Education: Dickinson College; University of Rochester (PhD)
- Occupations: Author, Professor
- Children: 2
- Writing career
- Notable work: An Arsonist's Guide to Writers' Homes in New England (2007)

Brock Clarke (born 1968) is an American novelist, short story writer, and essayist. His work is known for its satirical, sometimes surreal exploration of the lives of average Americans and the role of fiction in society.

In addition to his career as an author, Clarke has had a career in academia, holding faculty positions at Clemson University, the University of Cincinnati, and Bowdoin College. He is currently the A. Leroy Greason Professor of English at Bowdoin College, where he has been a member of the faculty since 2010.

Clarke lives in Portland, Maine.

== Biography ==
=== Early life ===
Brock Clarke was born in 1968 in Massachusetts. His father and grandfather were both college English professors. When he was young, he moved to Little Falls, New York, where he grew up, graduating from Little Falls High School. He earned a bachelor's degree from Dickinson College in 1990 and a PhD in English from the University of Rochester in 1998.

=== Career ===
Clarke began publishing his work while he was in graduate school, beginning with short stories in literary journals such as Mississippi Review. After earning his PhD, he lectured briefly at Cornell University before joining the faculty of Clemson University. At the same time, he published academic essays in scholarly journals like Twentieth Century Literature.

Clarke's first book, the novel The Ordinary White Boy, was published in 2001. It tells the story of a directionless young white man in Little Falls, New York, who takes it upon himself to locate a Puerto Rican friend who has disappeared. The critical response was muted. Kirkus Reviews praised the novel's "vivid sense of small-town life", but claimed it "fails to make a true claim on the reader's attention". Publishers Weekly called it "a rather dull tale" that suffered from a lack of lively characters. In the same year, Clarke joined the faculty of the University of Cincinnati.

In 2002, Clarke published a story collection, What We Won't Do, which features stories mostly set in and around the Adirondacks region of New York. This was followed by a second story collection, Carrying the Torch (2005). Then, in 2007, Clarke published his breakout work, An Arsonist's Guide to Writers' Homes in New England. The novel tells the story of Sam Pulsifer, who burned down the home of Emily Dickinson and tries to lift the suspicion that falls on him when other writers' homes begin to be attacked as well. Kirkus Reviews proclaimed the novel "subversively compelling" and "a page-turning pleasure for anyone who loves literature". In The New York Times, Janet Maslin wrote that the book "feels like the bright debut of an ingeniously arch humorist". Reviews in The New Yorker and The Guardian noted the author's wit, and the novel became a bestseller.

Clarke's next book was the novel Exley (2010), the story of a precocious boy who searches for Frederick Exley, whom he believes can revive his father from a coma. In The New York Times, Maslin criticized the novel's "confounding" plot and "sentimental and trite" story. Writing in the San Francisco Chronicle, Heller McAlpin called the novel a "postmodern metafiction" whose "sometimes dizzying" complexity was "not altogether effective". However, the critic Michael Schaub, reviewing the book for NPR, called it "extraordinary" and "the best work of [Clarke's] career", while Kirkus Reviews called it "a seriously playful novel" from "a unique voice in contemporary fiction". In the same year, Clarke joined the faculty of Bowdoin College.

Clarke's fourth novel, The Happiest People in the World, was published in 2014. Described as a "transcontinental screwball comedy", its plot revolves around a Danish cartoonist, on the run from terrorists, who relocates to upstate New York. Reviews were generally positive. Writing in The New York Times, J. Robert Lennon admired the novel's mix of "bewildering" energy and emotional investigation of its characters. Kathleen Rooney, writing in the Chicago Tribune, echoed Lennon's sentiment by praising the book's "zany" story. The Dallas Morning News proclaimed the book "among the funniest and most relevant social satires", while Publishers Weekly, in a starred review, said it was "impossible to put down".

Clarke published his third story collection, The Price of the Haircut, in 2018, the same year that he was appointed the A. Leroy Greason Professor of English at Bowdoin College. He followed it with his fifth novel, Who Are You, Calvin Bledsoe? (2019). Kirkus Reviews described the latter as "the funniest novel ever written about Calvinism", while the critic Kim Ode, writing in the Minneapolis Star Tribune, called it "absurd and absurdly entertaining". In 2022, Clarke published I, Grape, or The Case for Fiction, a collection of essays about the art of writing.

=== Personal life ===
Clarke is married and has two children.

== Work ==
=== Style ===
Clarke's writing has been described as absurdist dark comedy that is "outside the mainstream of American fiction". His stories are known for their elaborate, improbable plots and witty observations, leading critics to classify his work as social satire that uses surrealism to illuminate characters and their worlds.

=== Themes ===
Among the most prominent themes in Clarke's work is "American haplessness", or the condition of the ordinary American. His characters frequently strive to achieve things beyond their capabilities; they are limited by their own shortcomings and those of the world around them. In Exley, for example, the protagonist yearns to reunite his broken family, but is stymied both by his own delusions and an unstable therapist. In The Ordinary White Boy, the protagonist pursues self-improvement within a violent, racist society.

Another prominent theme in Clarke's work is the role of fiction in people's lives. Books and authors regularly feature in his work: An Arsonist's Guide to Writers' Homes in New England explores literary culture, including the practice of preserving authors' homes, while Exley hinges on the protagonist's belief that an author can have a transformative effect. In The Happiest People in the World, many of the characters hide their true identity behind a fictional biography. According to the journalist Catherine Keenan, Clarke's "interest is in fiction itself, particularly the stories we tell to insulate ourselves from life's overwhelming truths".

=== Influences ===
In interviews, Clarke has identified John Cheever and Muriel Spark, among others, as influences on his work. Critics have also pointed to the influence of Donald Barthelme on his work.

== Selected bibliography ==
=== Novels ===
- The Ordinary White Boy. Harcourt Inc., 2001. ISBN 978-0151008100
- An Arsonist's Guide to Writers' Homes in New England. Algonquin Books, 2007. ISBN 978-1565125513
- Exley. Algonquin Books, 2010. ISBN 978-1565126084
- The Happiest People in the World. Algonquin Books, 2014. ISBN 978-1616201111
- Who Are You, Calvin Bledsoe? Algonquin Books, 2019. ISBN 978-1616208219

=== Story collections ===
- What We Won't Do. Sarabande Books, 2002. ISBN 978-1889330679
- Carrying the Torch. University of Nebraska Press, 2005. ISBN 978-0803215511
- The Price of the Haircut. Algonquin Books, 2018. ISBN 978-1616208172
- Special Election. Acre Books, 2025. ISBN 978-1-946724-92-2

=== Essay collection ===
- I, Grape, or The Case for Fiction. Acre Books, 2021. ISBN 978-1946724366

== Honors ==
Clarke has received the following honors for his work:

- Mary McCarthy Prize for Short Fiction for What We Won't Do (2000)
- Pushcart Prize for "The Apology", originally published in New England Review (2004)
- Prairie Schooner Book Prize for Carrying the Torch (2004)
- National Endowment for the Arts Fellowship (2008)
- Pushcart Prize for "Our Pointy Boots", originally published in Ecotone (2009)
- Kirkus "Best Fiction of 2010" for Exley (2010)
- Independent Publisher Book Awards Gold Medal for I, Grape (2022)

In addition, Clarke's work has been anthologized in New Stories from the South: The Year's Best (2003, 2004) and You Must Be This Tall to Ride: Contemporary Writers Take You Inside the Story.
