= Ivan's Appeal =

- Ivan's Appeal Cover
- Author: Catherine Drury
- Cover artist: Junior Tomlin
- Language: English
- Subject: Environment
- Genre: Children's Novel
- Publisher: Stamford House Publishing
- Publication date: November 2007
- Publication place: United Kingdom
- Media type: Paperback
- ISBN: 978-1-904985-57-0
- OCLC: 191890001

Ivan's Appeal is a children's environmental tale about a melting iceberg, Ivan, and his campaign with schoolchildren to save the planet. It is a fantasy adventure story with an important message and purpose. It was published in November 2007 by Stamford House Publishing.

The book has received reviews from the United Nations Environment Programme and Primary Choice. The book has also been cited as an example of forming a narrative about climate change.

== Plot summary ==
Whilst on a family cruise in the Antarctic, Jo and Colin meet an iceberg called Ivan. He is slowly melting and pleads with the children to help him before it's too late.

Their father makes a videotape recording of Ivan and the problems faced by himself and the glaciers which is then aired on Blue Peter. This initiates a nationwide contest amongst schools to devise better environmental ways, and the prize is to visit the Antarctic to find Ivan. Thanks to a host of clever ideas from the children and an enlighted head teacher, Jo and Colin's school wins a place on the amazing sea voyage. They manage to locate Ivan, who is pretty ill, in time to tell him that his appeal has not been in vain.

== Characters ==
- Ivan - Ivan is a very sick iceberg. He is hearty, intelligent and possess an edgy sense of humour. He does not hold back in what he has to say and is a very skilled orator. Despite the adversity he faces he continues to fight, and wins over the hearts of all the people he comes into contact with.
- Colin - Colin is nine years old and Jo's brother. He is kind hearted but naive, knowing little about global warming. He has a tendency to say what he thinks and is initially annoyed with Ivan for saying that himself and mankind are responsible for the demise of the planet. However, he soon comes around to Ivan's message and, after swallowing his pride, becomes Ivan's biggest fan.
- Jo - Jo is Colin's twelve-year-old sister. She is clever, more informed, sensitive and compassionate. She takes the lead in taking Ivan's message to the rest of the world. She is a born campaigner who fights for what is right.
- Captain Nirvelli - Captain Nirvelli is in charge of the icebreaker cruise ship. He is well used to keeping passengers reassured with his dulcet tones and quiet wit. He enjoys the platform and engaging all on board over the microphone.
- Mr Byrne - Mr Byrne is the head teacher at Jo and Colin's school. He is warm and generous and thrives on watching his pupils grow and develop with confidence.
- Blue Peter Team - The Blue Peter team consists of Shane, Zulema and Tom. They are all chatty children's television presenters. They catch on to Ivan's message, seeing a good storyline and potential for some great camera opportunities, such as the grand entrance to Guanabar Bay.

== Themes and messages ==
The book has a strong environmental message that is put clearly and comprehensibly. It educates the reader about practical methods that can be used to reduce the factors causing global warming. It contains scientific information and statistics that children will be able to understand and use.

== About the author ==
Catherine Drury was born and grew up in Dublin. She qualified as a Social Science graduate at University College Dublin and obtained a master's degree in Public Policy at the University of Kent.
