= Free Food for Millionaires =

2007 novel by Min Jin Lee

- Author: Min Jin Lee
- Language: English
- Publisher: Warner Books
- Publication date: 2007
- Publication place: United States
- Media type: Print (hardcover)
- Pages: 562 pp (US Hardcover)
- ISBN: 0-446-58108-9
- OCLC: 76183613
- Dewey Decimal: 813/.6 22
- LC Class: PS3612.E346 F74 2007

Free Food for Millionaires is a 2007 novel by Korean American writer, Min Jin Lee. It was named one of the Top 10 Novels of the Year by The Times, a notable novel by the San Francisco Chronicle, a New York Times Editor's Choice, and was a selection for the Wall Street Journal Juggler Book Club.

The book is about a young Korean-American woman who graduates from college, and is determined to find a place in New York high society, despite having no money or job. The novel captures the tension between Korean cultural expectations and modern America.

In 2021 the novel was optioned by Netflix to be developed into a television series by Lee and Alan Yang.

== Synopsis ==
=== Book I: Works ===
Casey Han has just graduated from Princeton University and returned to live with her Korean immigrant parents, Joseph and Leah, and her younger sister Tina, in their small apartment in Elmhurst, Queens. While Casey is intelligent, she struggles with her impulsive spending habits and lack of direction, and she has yet to find a job. Casey’s independence, love of luxuries, and liberal attitudes towards sex clash with her frugal and religious parents. However, her lack of family wealth prevents her from fitting in with her moneyed classmates at Princeton, such as her best friend Virginia Craft. Frustrated with her father, Joseph’s constant criticism of her, Casey argues with him, causing him to strike her and throw her out of the apartment.

Casey leaves for her boyfriend Jay Currie’s apartment but discovers him mid-tryst with two other women. By chance, she encounters Ella Shim, a kindhearted and wealthy childhood acquaintance. Ella lets Casey stay at her apartment, since Casey has nowhere else to live. By request, Ella’s fiance, Ted Kim, reluctantly helps Casey interview for a sales assistant position at Kearn Davis, the prestigious Wall Street firm where he works. Casey lands the position and befriends her colleagues Hugh Underhill, a playboy broker in her department, and Delia Shannon, an attractive assistant that many men at Kearn Davis lust after.

Ella attempts to introduce her cousin Unu Shim to Casey, but Jay tracks down Casey and attempts to apologize. Angered at Jay, Casey punches him in the face. They reconcile and move in together, agreeing to eventually marry. In her free time, Casey begins taking millinery classes and making hats as a hobby.

Leah, her mother, finds Casey at Jay’s apartment and speaks with her, pleading with her to apologize to her father, Joseph, and return home. While Jay has always wanted to meet Casey’s parents, Casey knows they will not approve of her dating a non-Korean and has never told them about him, a persistent source of tension in their relationship. Against Casey’s wishes, Jay introduces himself to Leah, who is shocked that Casey is dating and living with a white man. During Ella and Ted’s wedding reception, Jay attempts to introduce himself to Joseph, though it is clear Joseph does not want to speak with him. Joseph disapproves of Jay and finds Jay’s behavior disrespectful, causing an altercation. Upset with Jay and unable to see a future with him, Casey breaks up with him and moves into a studio apartment.

=== Book II: Plans ===
To make rent, Casey resumes her former part time job as a hat and accessories saleswoman at Sabine’s, a luxury department store run by her mentor Sabine Jun Gottesman. Casey earns additional money by selling the hats she makes at the store. Sabine frequently offers to help Casey with her career and provides her with expensive gifts, but Casey often refuses Sabine’s assistance because she is worried about becoming indebted to her.

Ella sees a doctor about her difficult pregnancy and discovers she has contracted herpes. When Ella confronts Ted, he confesses that he had an affair with Delia, a colleague at Kearn Davis and Casey’s friend. The normally polite and reserved Ella excoriates Ted for his infidelity. Despite Ella’s fears, their daughter Irene is born healthy.

While golfing at a business conference, Casey coincidentally encounters Ella’s cousin Unu, who works at another bank. Unu is divorced and plans to never marry again, but he and Casey are drawn to each other and begin a relationship. Since Casey is worried about saving money and paying off her credit card debts, Unu asks her to move in with him.

Casey’s sister Tina marries her college boyfriend, Chul Baek. At Tina’s wedding, Ella tells Casey that Delia and Ted have both been fired from Kearn Davis after they were caught hooking up at the office, and that Ella plans to leave Ted. Ella acts strangely at the reception and faints, having overdosed on codeine due to the stress of her impending divorce.

Casey accepts a place at NYU Stern business school, refusing to use Sabine’s connections to get into Columbia. At Casey’s going away party, Delia apologizes for her role in Ella and Ted’s divorce, and Hugh attempts to seduce Casey, though she rejects him. Unu is laid off from his job. Casey notices his increasing gambling and debts, becoming stressed about their finances despite Unu’s reassurances. In search of a high-paying summer internship to pay off her debts, she resorts to calling in a favor with Hugh to land an interview at Kearn Davis’ internship program.

=== Book III: Grace ===
In divorce proceedings, Ted fights for half custody of their daughter Irene, deeply upsetting Ella. David Greene, Ella’s longtime friend and coworker, confesses his feelings to Ella and breaks off his engagement to another woman. Ella reciprocates David’s feelings, and they begin seeing each other.

At church, Leah Han and the choir are greeted by a new music director, Dr. Charles Hong. Charles is a Juilliard-trained composer who is talented but unsuccessful at keeping a stable job. Despite her lack of formal training, Leah is an incredibly talented singer, and she and Charles connect over their shared love of music. Charles notices Leah’s growing attraction to him and becomes infatuated with her. He attempts to seduce her, but while Leah is tempted, she does not want to betray her marriage to Joseph. Charles eventually forces himself on her, thinking that he is merely acting on their shared feelings. Leah is traumatized and blames herself for the assault, becoming ill and unable to work.

Casey is accepted at Kearn Davis as an investment banking intern and takes on a heavy workload, intent on receiving a return offer. At their college reunion, Casey is reunited with her college friend Virginia and encounters Jay, who is now engaged to a Japanese heiress. Unu is still unemployed several months after losing his job but turns down an offered position, seeing the role as a step down. He pawns his car and watch to cover some of his debts, continuing to struggle with his gambling addiction. Hugh invites Casey on a golfing trip, and she impulsively sleeps with him. When she admits her infidelity, Unu kicks her out of the apartment, and she is forced to stay with Sabine.

Leah’s illness continues, causing her to faint and later suffer a miscarriage– her illness is later recognized as the symptoms of pregnancy. When Casey visits her mother in the hospital, Leah confesses what happened between her and Charles, which Casey identifies as sexual assault. Casey confronts Charles and demands he leave his position at the church, destroying the manuscript of one of his compositions in revenge.

Unu’s gambling and debts worsen, and he finds himself evicted from his apartment, losing all of his and Casey’s possessions. He moves in with Ella and Irene and applies to work as a schoolteacher. Although Casey receives a job offer at Kearn Davis, she recognizes that investment banking is not for her and resolves to not accept the position. Casey visits Ella, who shares that Ted has decided to not pursue half custody, though he still intends to be involved in his daughter’s life. At Ella’s home, Casey and Unu meet each other again and apologize for their shortcomings, sharing a tender moment together.

== Characters ==
=== Major Characters ===
Casey Han: Casey is 22 at the beginning of the novel and is described as unusually tall for a Korean woman, though not particularly beautiful. She is hardworking and intelligent, with a keen understanding of other people, though she can also be hotheaded and prideful. She grew up in a devoutly Christian, working class Korean family in Elmhurst, though her time at Princeton introduced her to a high society world that she emulates through her hobbies and clothing. She enjoys hatmaking, fashion, and reading classic literature. Although she rebels against her religious upbringing, she reads a passage of the Bible every day and increasingly identifies as a person of faith. She is first dating Jay, her college boyfriend, and later becomes romantically linked to Ella’s cousin Unu. Although she aspires to wealth, her loans and credit card debts are a mounting source of anxiety throughout the novel.

Ella Shim: Ella is 21 at the beginning of the novel and is beautiful and refined in appearance, coming from a wealthy background. Her father, Dr. Douglas Shim, raised her as a single parent after his wife died giving birth to Ella. She attended Brearley and later Wellesley College. Ella is religious, kind, and mild-mannered, though she becomes more assertive and independent after discovering her husband Ted’s affair. She works at St. Christopher’s, a private school. After divorcing Ted, she begins seeing her St. Christopher’s colleague David Greene. Her young daughter is named Irene Kim.

Ted Kim: Ted Kim is 30 at the beginning of the novel, described as tall, tanned, and handsome. He was born in Alaska to Korean immigrants who worked in a cannery, though his intelligence and hard work allowed him to attend Harvard University for both his undergraduate and business school degrees. Ted is cynical, ambitious, and concerned about his social status and appearance, traits that serve him well in the finance world but do not endear him to Ella’s family or friends. Ted initially weds Ella because he is drawn to her status and elegance, though his later relationship with the blunt, down-to-earth Delia proves to be a better match.

Un-young “Unu” Shim: Unu is in his late twenties when he first meets Casey. He is described as thin and kind-looking. He and his cousin Ella Shim both come from an aristocratic, well-educated Korean family. While originally from Dallas, Unu attended Dartmouth College and moved to New York to become an asset manager. He was initially married to a Korean woman, who left him because she was still in love with a former boyfriend. His divorce makes him unwilling to marry again and also prompts his struggle with gambling. His gambling addiction and financial struggles grow throughout the novel, until he is forced to move in with Ella and her daughter Irene.

Delia Shannon: Delia is in her mid-thirties and is described as redheaded, curvy, and exceptionally attractive, often dressing in ways that highlight her figure. She grew up in a working-class white family on Staten Island and works as an assistant, and later an event coordinator, at Kearn Davis. Despite her penchant for sleeping with married men, she is honest and also deeply perceptive of other people. Although she initially spurns serious relationships, she later falls in love with and becomes engaged to Ted Kim.

Leah Han: Leah is in her late thirties at the start of the novel and has premature white hair, though she is otherwise a classic Korean beauty. From a poor rural family, she married the much older Joseph as a teenager in Korea and gave birth to Casey and Tina shortly before they immigrated to the United States. She is quiet, hardworking, and a devout Christian. Despite lacking formal training, she holds a deep passion for music and possesses an excellent singing voice. She and Joseph both hold traditional ideas about sex and marriage. The two of them manage a dry cleaning plant and live in Elmhurst, Queens.

Joseph Han: Joseph is in his late fifties and is short, stocky, and balding. Although originally from a merchant family in Pyongyang, Joseph lost contact with his family and became a penniless refugee due to the Korean War. His first wife passed away from tuberculosis, and he married and started a family with the much younger Leah in Korea before they immigrated to New York. Like Casey, Joseph can be hardheaded and prideful, though he is also hardworking and loyal to his family. He is a devout Christian and manages a dry cleaning plant with Leah.

Tina Han: Tina is 20 at the beginning of the novel and is described as classically beautiful, resembling her mother Leah. Unlike Casey, she is even-tempered and agreeable, and more religious, though she has always looked up to her older sister and is more open-minded than their parents. She attends MIT, where she meets her boyfriend Chul Baek, a fellow Korean Christian. Tina and Chul get married and attend medical school, but Tina is forced to take a few years away from school due to becoming pregnant with her and Chul's first child.

=== Supporting Characters ===
Jay Currie: Jay is 24 at the beginning of the novel. He is white and was raised by his single mother, a librarian. Like Casey, his lack of familial wealth makes him an outsider at Princeton, and he aspires to climb the social ladder. While humorous and gentle-natured, he also doesn’t understand Casey’s Korean background, causing conflict with her and her family. He works at Kearn Davis and later becomes engaged to Keiko Uchida, a Japanese heiress. Casey suspects he has a fetish for Asian women.

Sabine Jun Gottesman: Sabine is in her forties and was born in Korea to a merchant family, becoming a successful department store owner in the United States. Although she has step-children from her husband Isaac’s prior marriages, she has no children of her own and views Casey as a surrogate daughter.

Dr. Douglas Shim: Dr. Shim is Ella’s father, a wealthy ophthalmologist from Korea. After his wife passed away in childbirth, he raised their daughter Ella as a single father. He is a supportive and attentive parent, though he is not fond of her fiance Ted Kim. Although he chose to never remarry, he has an unrequited attraction to Leah Han.

Dr. Charles Moon-su Hong: Charles is forty-eight and was born to a wealthy family of Korean academics, though he is much less successful career-wise than the rest of his family. He is a talented classical composer who trained at Juilliard and in Europe. He has been married and divorced twice and has had affairs with many married women. He takes an interest in Leah Han after he becomes the choir director at her Korean church.

David Greene: As Director of Development at St. Christopher’s School, he is first Ella's supervisor and later her colleague when she is rehired as administrative assistant. David is in his mid thirties and from a wealthy white family. He has long had feelings for Ella, causing him to break off his engagement to another woman to be with her.

Virginia Craft: Virginia is Casey’s best friend from Princeton. She is free spirited and cosmopolitan, writing Casey letters throughout the novel about her adventures in Europe as an art history student. Although adopted by a wealthy WASP family, Virginia is of half-Mexican, half-Anglo descent and is racially ambiguous in appearance.

George Ortiz: George is Puerto Rican and works as the doorman at Unu’s apartment building. He is funny, easygoing, and a friend of Unu’s.

Joseph McReed: Joseph is the elderly owner of an antique book store who befriends Casey, gifting her the vintage hats of his deceased wife.

Hugh Underhill: a broker who befriends Casey during her time as an assistant at Kearn Davis. Hugh is described as a tall and handsome white man with playboy tendencies.

Kyung-ah Shin: Leah Han’s friend from the church choir, a successful Korean immigrant businesswoman who owns several shoe stores. Kyung-ah is stylish and bold, and she has had several affairs, including with Charles.
