= Evolution, Me & Other Freaks of Nature =

2007 novel by Robin Brande

- Author: Robin Brande
- Language: English
- Genre: Young adult fiction
- Publisher: Random House
- Publication date: August 2007
- Publication place: United States
- Media type: Print (hardcover)
- Pages: 268pp
- ISBN: 978-0-375-84349-5
- OCLC: 77047733
- LC Class: PZ7.B73598 Evo 2007

Evolution, Me & Other Freaks of Nature (2007) is a young adult novel by Robin Brande.

== Plot ==
The story follows Mena Reece, a high school freshman. She has recently been kicked out of her evangelical Christian church for writing a letter that has exposed the church, and her parents’ insurance agency, to a lawsuit for what members of the church's youth group did to a fellow high school student. She soon finds herself being abused by members of her former church, is permanently grounded by her parents, and in the middle of her school's evolution verses intelligent design debate. All the while Mena manages to keep her faith in God though starts to doubt everything else in the world.

== Characters ==
Mena Reece — narrator of the story and protagonist. Mena is an average freshman, overprotected and overly unexposed to pop culture because of her parents. She develops a crush on Casey and then they go out in the end.

Casey Connor — Mena's only friend in school and her science lab partner. Casey is a very intelligent boy who loves Lord of the Rings and is considered somewhat nerdy.

Kayla Connor — Casey's older sister and senior in high school. She is also very smart and is into journalism. She has her own website which she reports on daily.

Ms. Shepherd — The freshman science teacher at New Advantage High School. She can be funny in a not entirely obvious way. As a lover of science, she will not back down and will defend herself when the topic of not teaching evolution arises. Surprisingly, it is revealed at the end of the novel that Ms. Shepherd attends church.

Teresa — Mena's former group member and is now considered an enemy out to get her.

Denny — A fellow student. He's been tormented by the "Back Turners" to the point of attempted suicide for being gay. He's one of the things that Mena wrote in her letter exposing her church.

== Awards ==
The American Library Association chose Evolution, Me & Other Freaks of Nature as one of the Best Books for Young Adults 2008. Kirkus Reviews chose the novel as one of its recommendations for Young Adult Reading Groups.

== See also ==
- ALA Best Fiction for Young Adults
