= Oblivion (Fabbri novel) =

2007 novel by Edda Fabbri

Oblivion is a 2007 debut non-fiction novel by Uruguayan author Edda Fabbri. Published in Havana, Cuba by Casa de las Américas, the autobiographical work won the Casa de las Américas Prize.

== Background ==
The book consists of a series of fragmentary accounts of life in the Cárcel de Punta de Rieles (Punta de Rieles women's prison). The narrative begins on the day the female political prisoners were released (March 14, 1985) before looking back at various scenes of daily prison life that give the chapters their titles, such as "The Corridor," "Work," "The Movies," "Recess," and "The Bars."

== Genre ==
Scholars have analyzed the book as a work that straddles the line between testimonial literature and autofiction. Fabbri chooses not to focus on factual events and treats memories with skepticism, constructing a narrative made of fragments based on the understanding that "memory is not what happened; it is the traces left behind." Consequently, Oblivion has garnered attention within the canon of prison literature for the unusual way it weaves together personal lived experience, individual memory, and collective experience.

== Awards ==
The book won the Casa de las Américas Prize; the jury deemed it "a story of great testimonial and literary value that demonstrates not only an effective use of narrative techniques but also a profound sensitivity that enriches the account and lends it authenticity."
