= Where the Blind Horse Sings =

2007 book by Kathy Stevens

- Where the Blind Horse Sings first edition cover
- Author: Kathy Stevens; Elizabeth Marshall Thomas (foreword)
- Illustrator: Michael DiPleco, Dion Ogust, and Julie Barone (photos)
- Cover artist: Dick Crenson
- Language: English
- Subject: Animal care, Pets
- Genre: Non-fiction
- Publisher: Skyhorse Publishing
- Publication date: May 2007
- Publication place: United States
- Media type: Print (Hardback & Paperback)
- Pages: 240 pp (first edition)
- ISBN: 978-1-60239-055-3
- OCLC: 85851558

Where the Blind Horse Sings is a 2007 non-fiction book written by Kathy Stevens, the founder of Catskill Animal Sanctuary. The book is about Stevens's experiences working in the sanctuary.

== Author ==
Kathy Stevens is the founder and director of Catskill Animal Sanctuary in Saugerties, NY. She left her 11-year teaching career behind in 2000 to transform a rundown farm into a haven for abused horses and farm animals. In addition to the rescue and rehabilitation of animals, Stevens has dedicated her efforts educating the public on matters of human health concerns and environmental damage associated with factory farming practices.
