= Ram Oren =

Israeli author

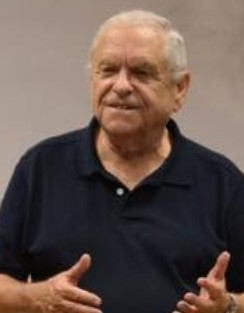
Ram Oren

Ram Oren (Hebrew: רם אורן; born 8 March 1936) is an Israeli author who has sold an unprecedented 1 million books in Hebrew.

Oren was born in Tel Aviv during the Mandate era. At age 15, he began his journalistic career as a messenger boy for Yediot Aharonot, and was a correspondent for that newspaper from 1952 to 1955. From 1955 to 1958, he served in the Israel Defense Forces as a reporter for the IDF's weekly magazine Bamahane. From 1958 to 1963, he studied law at the Hebrew University of Jerusalem. From 1964 to 1994, he worked again for Yediot Aharonot. He advanced to editorship of important sections in the newspaper, and was at one point its chief correspondent in New York City. He only began his career as a literary writer at a relatively advanced age.

In 1994, he published his first book, Seduction (Keter Publishing). The book did not sell well at first, and was considered a commercial failure. Then Oren appeared on Dan Shilon's television show, the most popular Israeli talk show at the time. The appearance was a springboard for the book, which turned into one of Israel's most popular bestsellers ever. A 2002 movie adaptation was also successful.

Oren's success at the tills, nearly unprecedented in Israeli publishing, led him to found a publishing house, "Keshet". Founded in 1996, the company advertises Oren's books as well as bestsellers by authors such as Shifra Horn, Irit Linoor, Shelly Yachimovich, and Koby Oz.

His books have been translated into several languages, including English and French.

Most of his books are in the detective fiction genre. In 2002 his first book presenting a historical episode was published, Latrun, employing his compelling, readable style. In 2004 he published another book in this category, Target: Tel Aviv, concerning the Egyptian Army's invasion of Israel in the War of Independence.

Oren lives in Tel Aviv. He has been married to his wife Nitza since 1961. They have three children and grandchildren.

== Books ==
List of published books

- Seduction (suspense; 1994)
- Framed (suspense; 1995)
- Mark of Cain (suspense; 1996). English translation: Tel Aviv: Keshet, 1998, ISBN 965-90130-5-1.
- Heart (suspense; 1997)
- Shadow of Doubt (suspense; 1997)
- Ashram (novel; 1998)
- Live Ammunition (suspense; 1999)
- Eve and Adam (novel; 2000)
- Nude (suspense; 2000)
- Love Behind Closed Doors (suspense; 2001)
- Addiction and Other Stories (2002)
- Latrun (historical novel; 2002)
- African Princess (suspense; 2003)
- The Heiress (suspense; 2004)
- The Target: Tel Aviv (historical novel; 2004)
- Little Sister (suspense; 2005)
- My Lover, My Enemy (suspense; 2006)
- Red Days (historical novel; 2006)
- Gertruda's Oath (2007). English translation released by Doubleday in 2009
- Chief of Staff (novel; 2007)
- Ghosts (suspense; 2008)
- Green Card (suspense; 2008)
- From the Bible with Love (biblical stories; 2009)
- Sylvia Rafael: The Life and Death of a Mossad Spy. With Moti Kfir. (biographical novel; 2010)
- One Child Too Many (suspense; 2010)
- Secrets (novel; 2011)
- Double Identity (suspense; 2011)
- Yearning Soul (historical novel; 2012)
- Black Sheep (suspense; 2012)
- The Red Scarf (historical novel; 2013)
- Mother (novel; 2014)
- Painful Love: Shiri (trilogy, part 1; 2014)
- Painful Love: Danny (trilogy, part 2; 2015)
- Painful Love: Amira (trilogy, part 3; 2015)
- Live TV (novel; 2016)
