= Current Nobody =

Current Nobody is a full-length play by Melissa James Gibson that premiered at the Woolly Mammoth Theatre in Washington, DC, on October 29, 2007. It is an adaptation of the Odyssey.

The work offers a play on gender roles against the backdrop of the Trojan War, as stay-at-home father Od struggles to raise his children while his wife Pen covers the military conflict as a journalist.

The Washington Post described the play as "wise" and "heartsome."
