= Late Nights on Air =

2007 novel by Elizabeth Hay

- First edition cover of Canadian release
- Author: Elizabeth Hay
- Subject: Broadcasting
- Genre: Fiction, novel
- Publisher: McClelland & Stewart
- Publication date: September 16, 2007
- Publication place: Canada
- Media type: Print (Hardcover & Paperback)
- Pages: 364 pp.
- ISBN: 9780771038112

Late Nights on Air is a novel by Canadian writer Elizabeth Hay, published by McClelland & Stewart in 2007. In the book, the author chronicles her experiences as a CBC Radio journalist. The novel is set at a radio station in Yellowknife, Northwest Territories. Hay calls it a book "about the romance of the disembodied voice."

== Plot summary ==
After being fired from his latest television job, a disgraced Harry Boyd returns to his radio roots in the northern Canadian town of Yellowknife as the manager of a station no one listens to. He finds himself at the center of the station's unlikely social scene. New anchor Dido Paris, both renowned and mocked for her Dutch accent, fled an affair with her husband's father, only to be torn between Harry and another man. Wild child Gwen came to learn radio production, but under Harry's tutelage finds herself the guardian of the late-night shift. And lonely Eleanor wonders if it's time to move south just as she meets an unlikely suitor. While the station members wait for Yellowknife to get its first television station and the crew embarks on a life-changing canoe expedition, the city is divided over a proposal to build a pipeline that would cut across Native lands, bringing modernization and a flood of workers, equipment and money into sacred territory. Hay's crystalline prose, keen details and sharp dialogue sculpt the isolated, hardy residents of Yellowknife, who provide a convincing backdrop as the main cast tromps through the existential woods.

== Awards ==
Late Nights on Air was the winner of the 2007 Scotiabank Giller Prize.
