= Gertruda's Oath =

2009 book by Ram Oren

Gertruda's Oath: A Child, a Promise, and a Heroic Escape During World War II
- Author: Ram Oren
- Original title: ha-Shevu'ah
- Translator: Barbara Harshav
- Language: English
- Subject: Biography, Jewish history, Holocaust survivors
- Published: 2009 (Doubleday)
- Publication place: USA
- Media type: Print (hardback)
- Pages: 310
- ISBN: 9780385527194
- OCLC: 1039113073

Gertruda's Oath: A Child, a Promise, and a Heroic Escape During World War II is a 2009 book (originally published in Israel as ha-Shevu'ah in 2007) by Ram Oren and translated by Barbara Harshav. It follows the story of a Jewish boy, Michael Stolowitzky, and his Catholic nanny, Gertruda Bablinska, and their escape from Poland to Palestine during WWII.

== Publication history ==
- 2007, ha-Shevu'ah, Israel, Keshet ISBN 9789657130322
- 2009, USA, Doubleday ISBN 9780385527194

== Reception ==
A review in Booklist of Gertruda's Oath wrote "this is memoir uses the techniques of historical fiction, but the author points out that although he has invented dialogue and detail, the characters and events are true." and "The story is never sentimentalized, and the reality of the genocide is always there.".

Gertruda's Oath has also been reviewed by The Polish Review, the Catholic Standard, Yad Vashem, and the Jewish Book Council.
