= Red Seas Under Red Skies =

American fantasy novel by Scott Lynch

- Author: Scott Lynch
- Language: English
- Genre: Fantasy
- Publisher: Gollancz (UK); Bantam Spectra (USA)
- Publication date: June 20, 2007
- Publication place: United States
- Media type: Print (hardcover, paperback), audio, eBook
- Pages: 558 (US hardback edition)
- ISBN: 0553804685 (US Edition); ISBN 0-575-07925-8 (UK edition)
- OCLC: 85690373
- Preceded by: The Lies of Locke Lamora
- Followed by: The Republic of Thieves

Red Seas Under Red Skies is a fantasy novel by American writer Scott Lynch, the second book (of a projected seven) in the Gentleman Bastard Sequence series. It continues the adventures of protagonist Locke Lamora and his friend Jean Tannen as they arrive on the exotic shores of Tal Verrar, where they must face the dangers of their past, as well as new rivals that wish to stop them at all costs while they try to pull their most ambitious con yet.

== Plot summary ==
Two years after Locke Lamora and Jean Tannen fled Camorr, they have created new secret identities for themselves in the island city of Tal Verrar as professional gamblers at an opulent casino called the Sinspire. The establishment, run by a man named Requin and his disfigured lover Selendri, has a policy that anyone caught cheating at the games is to be killed no matter how high-born they may be. Locke and Jean have been constantly cheating at the games despite this, primarily by manipulating the subtle weaknesses of their gambling opponents, and have gone through many procedures across Tal Verrar and nearby regions to find a way to break into Requin's heavily fortified vault. But they begin to fear for the success of their scheme when the Bondsmagi of Karthain, speaking through the possessed bodies of night market vendors, threaten revenge against the duo for torturing and mutilating the Falconer. Having such power means that the Bondsmagi could kill the two, by simply possessing them and making them kill each other. However, throughout the book the Bondsmagi refrain from such direct action, contenting themselves with acting subtly and indirectly against the two.

Locke decides to enact the next phase of their plan by revealing to Selendri that they have been cheating. When brought to Requin and ordered to explain both their actions and his seemingly suicidal confession, Locke claims that they are working for some unknown party who is paying them through proxies to rob his vault. He claims to have confessed to the cheating because he is tired of this secondhand connection to their employer, wishing to instead work at the Sinspire. Requin and Selendri grudgingly decide to spare the duo's lives for the time being.

Soon after Requin's interrogation, Locke and Jean are captured by the Eyes of the Archon, elite soldiers who work directly for the leader of Tal Verrar - who are under the command of a highly capable woman named Merrain Merrai - and brought to the Mon Magisteria, the capital building of the city. There, they meet the archon Maxilan Stragos, who tricks them into drinking a poison which kills a person in two months if periodic antidotes are not taken. Stragos had received dispatches from contacts among the Bondsmagi about their true identities, their activities in Camorr, and the Bondsmagi's satisfaction with letting Stragos use them as he pleased. The archon decides to exploit Locke and Jean's impersonation skills by having them learn to pretend to be competent sailors. He then wants them to command a ship, sail across the Sea of Brass to the Ghostwind Islands in the far south, gain the support of pirates in that region, and then return to Tal Verrar's waters to pillage ships. Stragos hopes that the supposed pirate threat will make the Verrari people desperate for a strengthened navy, which the archon, the commander-in-chief of Tal Verrar's military, would provide. This would also give the archonate far more power relative to the Priori, the governmental council which co-rules the city with the archon but desires to avoid war to preserve their economic interests. Stragos gave Locke and Jean the poison, the antidote to which only his personal alchemist can concoct, because the two-month window gives them just enough time to get to the Ghostwinds and back with pirate allies; Stragos promises to give the duo a permanent antidote once their assignment is thoroughly completed. Upon talking to Requin again, Locke is able to fit Stragos into his story as the supposed true identity of the mysterious employer he discussed earlier. A short interlude given from the archon's point of view lets the reader know that - unlike what she had led Locke and Jean believe - Merrain does not work for the archon, but has been sent by her unnamed "masters" to temporarily work with him. In the conversation Merrain also casually mentions that, should the archon's plans succeed, they would result in "more bloodshed than was seen in two hundred years" - an outcome which Merrain evidently considers acceptable or even desirable.

As Locke and Jean go through heavy cramming on naval matters with sailing master Caldris bal Comar, they suddenly become the target of several assassination attempts by some unknown party unconnected to either Requin or Stragos. Nonetheless, after a month of training they are given charge of a ship called the Red Messenger and ordered to free imprisoned sailors in the Windward Rock dungeon to comprise their crew. The archon also orders them to keep the sailors from killing the incapacitated guards; Locke and Jean comply. However, after the crew's escape Merrain covertly kills the guards - acting on behalf of her true bosses, and clearly without the archon's knowledge. This act would discredit Locke and Jean in the archon's eyes and later on would come close to getting them killed by him.

During the voyage south, Locke and Jean play the parts of captain and first mate while Caldris gives them discreet guidance on commanding the ship. The strain of covering for the duo while also tending to all the ship's affairs leads to the elderly Caldris having a fatal heart attack right before a major storm; without Caldris’ help, Locke's incompetence results in several dead crewmen and damage to the ship's mast. The surviving Messengers, now aware that Locke and Jean are not real sailors, mutiny and put the two out to sea in a small boat.

Hours after the mutiny, the Red Messenger and the duo's boat are captured by a pirate ship called the Poison Orchid captained by Zamira Drakasha. Locke, Jean, and the captured Messengers are put on the Poison Orchid’s “scrub watch,” a group of captured men who do lowly labor. Locke is interrogated by Zamira about the reason he commandeered a ship despite his clear inexperience, while Jean and the ship's first mate, Ezri Delmastro, fall in love. Under Zamira's rules, the scrub watch have the opportunity to become full Orchids by participating in a raid on another ship. Locke and Jean volunteer to be the first to board the next ship in order to regain the trust they lost with the Messengers. The duo's bravery becomes an object of admiration among the crew when the ship they raid turns out be defended by vicious Jeremite Redeemers.

Jean contends with Locke that the pirates, as fellow thieves, deserve their full frankness instead of Locke's plan to lead them to their doom against Tal Verrar. Following the Messengers’ induction into the Poison Orchid’s crew, Locke takes Jean's advice, telling Zamira the truth about how Stragos has been using him and begging her to help him find a way to subvert the archon's scheme. In Port Prodigal, the sole remaining town in the Ghostwinds, Zamira relays Locke's request to a council of pirate captains. Although the council votes to let her go against Stragos, they secretly fear that the archon will attack them in retaliation and decide to later send Jaffrim Rodanov to keep Zamira from dragging the rest of them into any potential conflict.

Locke and Jean return to Tal Verrar with the Poison Orchid and reestablish contact with Stragos, to whom they promise to begin attacking ships, and Requin, who they fool into thinking they will immediately return to the Ghostwinds. They and the Orchids deliberately aggravate the archon by only partly adhering to his orders, staging a half-hearted raid on a small merchant vessel but mounting a massive assault on a town to the northwest where peasants endure cruel and humiliating games by nobles for money. Locke and Jean hope to get close enough to the archon's alchemist during one of their subsequent meetings to somehow take the antidote, but Stragos eventually refuses to see them again unless they have mounted a proper raid on a ship.

Rodanov's ship intercepts Zamira and attacks the Poison Orchid. As the battle turns into a stalemate, one of the Orchids who had actually been working for Rodanov brings up an alchemical sphere capable of quickly burning through the ship's hull and threatens to ignite it unless Zamira surrenders. He accidentally lights it prematurely when one of the Orchids shoots him with an arrow, but Ezri sacrifices her life to throw the burning sphere onto the enemy ship instead, killing the rest of Rodanov's crew. Locke and a grieving Jean decide to take down Stragos that same night while also completing the Sinspire job.

Deciding to involve the Priori against the archon, Locke and Jean sneak into the house of Marius Cordo and his son Lyonis, both members of the Priori who frequent the Sinspire. Marius turns out to be the one who hired the mysterious assassins to kill the two thieves based on false information from the Bondsmagi that Locke and Jean were threats to the Priori. Deciding to let the assassination matter drop, Locke enlists their aid against Stragos. Locke and Jean then convince the Eyes to arrest them publicly outside the Sinspire to help them complete their heist scheme. At the Sinspire, Locke and Jean tell Requin in his office that the archon knows about their plan to defect. When an angry Requin goes down to handle the situation, Locke and Jean overpower Selendri and the guards while revealing that the steps they took to break into the vault were a ruse to distract from their real plan: to steal the valuable Therin Throne era paintings in Requin's office. Locke and Jean sneak back down to the ground floor with the paintings and let themselves be arrested by the Eyes; on the way back to the Mon Magisteria, Lyonis and his men kill the Eyes and take their uniforms as disguises.

At the Mon Magisteria, Stragos, with Merrain and the alchemist present, tells Locke and Jean of his intent to have them executed for the murdered guards at Windward Rock. The disguised Lyonis and his men knock down the archon and take control of the castle. The captured alchemist reveals that he currently only has one vial of the antidote prepared, but when Locke and Jean plan to take him with them to make more, Merrain kills him with a poisoned dagger and tries unsuccessfully to kill Locke, Jean, and Stragos before running off. Locke and Jean give Stragos to Zamira and her crew to imprison and torment as they desire before leaving for Vel Virazzo.

Requin and Selendri subsequently strike a deal with the Priori to help shape the new order in Tal Verrar. Requin then reveals to Selendri that the stolen paintings were actually recent replicas of the real Therin Throne works hidden in his vault. Locke and Jean find this out themselves from the Vel Virazzo art dealer buying the paintings, who gives them a small fraction of the original price he would have paid for the genuine articles. As the duo sullenly eat a meal on a rented ship, Jean insists that Locke drink the antidote, only for Locke to admit that he had already snuck the antidote into Jean's drink. Locke then tells Jean that he wants them to sail the Sea of Brass to “somewhere new” during the last few weeks Locke has to live.

The book thus ends with a huge cliffhanger, Locke apparently doomed to die soon - which is left to be resolved in the series' next volume. Also left open is the question of who Merrain was truly working for.
