= A Good and Happy Child =

2007 novel by Justin Evans

- Author: Justin Evans
- Cover artist: José Guadalupe Posada
- Language: English
- Genre: Thriller, horror, suspense
- Published: 2007 (Crown Publishing Group)
- Publication place: United States
- Media type: Print (hardback)
- Pages: 336 pp
- ISBN: 978-0-307-35122-7
- OCLC: 70864488
- Dewey Decimal: 813/.6 22
- LC Class: PS3605.V366 G66 2007

A Good and Happy Child is a 2007 horror thriller novel by Justin Evans; it is his debut novel. The book was published on May 22, 2007 by Crown and concerns a new father's growing horror over his own childhood memories and possible brush with the supernatural. Film rights for A Good and Happy Child were sold to Paramount Pictures in 2012.

== Summary ==
Thirty-year-old George Davies can’t bring himself to hold his newborn son. After months of accepting his behavior, his wife, Maggie, demands that he see a therapist, and George, desperate to save his marriage and redeem himself as a father and husband, reluctantly agrees. This brings him into the office of Dr. H. Surman in Manhattan, where George is tasked with keeping notebooks, which he uses to talk about supernatural incidents that happened when he was 11 years old in Preston, Virginia.

As he delves into his childhood memories, he begins to recall things from the distant past, such as the odd, rambling letters his father, Paul, sent home from Honduras before he became sick with jaundice and died, and his mother, Joan, who started dating too soon after his father’s death. A boy that George refers to as simply "Friend", who appeared one night when George was lonely and told him secrets he didn't want to know. No one believed this new friend was real and was responsible for the bad things that were happening. There's also the conflict between Paul's faith in religion and belief in demonic possession and Joan's rational agenda that has no space for those beliefs. The only people who seem to believe George are his parents' colleagues, Tom Harris, his godfather Freddie, and Clarissa Bing. George's mother refuses to believe him even when she witnesses a poltergeist causing the shower door to slam open and close, eventually shattering completely.

Terrified by all that he has forgotten, George struggles to remember what really happened in the months following his father’s death, wondering whether his ominous visions and erratic behavior were the product of a grief-stricken child’s overactive imagination, and whether his father’s colleagues, who blamed a darker, more malevolent force, were right to look to the supernatural as a means to end George’s suffering? Twenty years later, when a mysterious murder is revealed, remembering the past becomes the only way George can protect himself and his family.

== Reception ==
Critical reception for A Good and Happy Child has been positive. Reviewers have called the book "ambitious", frequently praising the usage of psychology in the book as an outlook for the book and as a possible way of explaining the events in the novel. The book's ambiguity over whether the possession was real or imagined was also a point of discussion for some reviewers, with the Washington Post citing it as a highlight.

A reviewer for the Charlotte Observer commented on the book's similarity to Hamlet, while Dread Central and the New York Times compared it to The Exorcist.

== Characters ==
- George Davies - George is a 30-year-old man at the beginning of the novel, reflecting back on incidents from when he was 11-year-old. He's conflicted as an adult because he has a psychological block that's preventing him from holding his newborn son.
- Joan Davies - Joan is George's mother. She's a professor who prides herself on her written discourse.
- Paul Davies - Paul is George's father, who died while on a trip to Honduras. Paul's colleagues believe he was a "mystic" and had visions related to God and the devil.
- Tom Harris - Tom Harris, who is almost always referred to by his first and last name, is a friend of the family. He believes that George is possessed.
- Freddie - Freddie is a colleague of Paul and Joan from their time in college. He's also George's godfather.
- Clarissa Bing - Clarissa is another colleague of Paul and Joan's from college.
- Richard (psychiatrist) - Richard is George's childhood psychiatrist. He is on George's side and is trying to help him get over the death of his father.
- Dr. Gilloon (psychiatrist) - Dr. Gilloon is another psychiatrist. He believes George is a threat to society and wants him to be committed to Forest Glen, an overcrowded psychiatric hospital.
- Kurt Moore- Kurt is Joan's new boyfriend. Even though they started dating shortly after Paul's death, George takes a liking to Kurt due to his kindness and strength.
