= Mark of Cain (novel) =

Cover of original Hebrew publication.

The Mark of Cain (Hebrew: אות קין, Ot Ḳayin) is a novel by Israeli author Ram Oren. It was Israel's top paperback for five weeks; was in April 1996 'the fastest selling book in Israeli history'; and by 2008 had sold 100,000 copies. It is based on Neo-Nazi activities in Argentina and the identity of a Mossad chief, Michael Bornstein.

Using earnings from earlier books, and marketing wisdom he had garnered suggesting that readers are more likely to buy books they see piled in tall stacks on bookstore counters, Oren decided to publish Mark of Cain himself in a print run thought to have been the largest ever for a novel in Israel, 30,000 copies.

== Plot summary ==
The story opens with the liberation of a German concentration camp and the escape of Jewish refugees. One of them, a man named Jacob Bornstein, stumbles across a burning German convoy and finds a crying baby in the car of the commander, Berman. He rescues it and claims it as his own son, looking at it as a compensation from Heaven for his own lost son. However, without food he and the baby fall deathly ill and are taken to a hospital, where they are nursed back to health. But the hospital director suspects that the baby, whom the Jew has named Michael, is not his real son, and Jacob escapes with the infant. He is housed by a kindly German woman whose husband was in the SS and she takes care of him and the baby lovingly until she discovers he is Jewish. Jacob runs away, and is soon placed in a refugee camp. Shortly after he is smuggled into Israel, but the ship is intercepted and when they are discovered by the British, the passengers revolt and the ship is burned. Jacob and the infant barely escape.

Years later, when Michael is seventeen, Jacob dies leaving his adopted son devastated, and carrying his secret to the grave. Michael eventually becomes head of the Israeli intelligence, the Mossad, and sends a spy called Dan Elad to intercept Neo-Nazi activities in Argentina. He is housed at the ranch of the former camp commander Herman Mueller and his daughter Ilsa. Soon after their friend Kurt Kirshchner suspects him as a spy, but Ilsa refuses to listen. On a trip to Germany, Herman Mueller tells his daughter that she was the daughter of the commander of a concentration camp, Berman. She visits their graves but finds that a grave for her brother, who should have been a baby when he died, is missing. she hires a detective to locate him and shortly after Mueller, close to arrest, commits suicide.

Dan Elad finally manages to organize a plan with the Mossad chief to kidnap Ilsa on her return from Germany, and when she is brought to Jerusalem he at first pretends that he has been kidnapped along with her. Finally Michael discovers that the detective hired by Ilsa is close to discovering his identity, and, shocked, has DNA tests prove if there is any truth in it. They reveal that he is Ilsa's brother.

With his friend Amnon, who is running for Prime Minister of Israel, Michael decides that it is better to acknowledge his identity before the detective. He confesses it publicly on the News, and many protest to his remaining the Mossad chief. He visits Ilsa in prison and tells her who he is, and despite his determination to remain a Jew, she admits she cannot hate him.

Finally the trial is held in Jerusalem and after Dan Elad's testimony of her activities, Ilsa is sentenced to twenty years in prison. After Michael brings his family to see their aunt, protests to his being chief of Mossad become even higher. His son is kidnapped as a final warning, and returns with scars and minor injuries. In jail Ilsa hangs herself, thinking that it is she who causes the "Mark of Cain" on Michael, hence the title. But it doesn't help.

The present Prime Minister, ill and weakening in his position, decides that it is best to fire Michael. It is hard for Michael to cope with the truth, and when his friend Amnon is named Prime Minister, he reinstates Michael as head of the Mossad, giving a touching speech and calling forth a standing ovation.

== Bibliographic information ==
- אות קין [Ot Ḳayin] (Tel Aviv: Ḳeshet, 1996; תל אביב: ק), ISBN 978-9652226860
- Mark of Cain, trans. by S. Melmoth (Tel Aviv: Keshet, 1998), ISBN 978-9659013050 [English translation]
- Káin bélyege, trans. by Szantó András (Budapest: Könyvek, 2007), ISBN 978-9636353186 [Hungarian translation]

== Reviews ==
- לוי, גדעון. הסופרמן הישראלי מכה שוב. הארץ, מוסף ספרים, גל' 157 (ח' באדר תשנ"ו, 28 בפברואר 1996), עמ' 7. [Gideon Levi, 'The Israeli Superman Strikes Again', Ha'aretz, Book Supplement, 157 (8 February 1996), p. 7.]
- Brauner, David (2 October 1998). "A Tight What If Story (book review)". Jerusalem Post. ProQuest 319230979.
