= Edda Fabbri =

- Born: 1949 (age 76–77); Montevideo, Uruguay
- Education: University of the Republic School of Medicine
- Occupation: writer
- Children: 2
- Writing career
- Genre: testimonial novel
- Notable work: Oblivion
- Notable awards: Casa de las Américas Prize

Edda Fabbri (born 1949) is an Uruguayan writer. She won the Casa de las Américas Prize for her testimonial novel Oblivion, which recounts her experiences as a political prisoner during Uruguay's civic-military dictatorship.

== Biography ==
Edda Fabbri was born in Montevideo, in 1949. Her interest in leftist movements began at home at an early age, when she would analyze Fidel Castro's speeches. During the 1960s and 1970s, she studied at the University of the Republic School of Medicine, where she became involved in the dissident student movement. In 1971, she joined the National Liberation Movement-Tupamaros. A few months later, she was imprisoned at the Cabildo Jail, where both political prisoners and those detained for common crimes were held. One month later, she managed to escape alongside 37 other female inmates through the facility's pipes and tunnels during Operación Estrella (Operation Star), an escape coordinated with movement members who provided support from the outside.

After nine months of freedom, she was imprisoned again in 1972 at Cárcel de Punta de Rieles, where she remained incarcerated for the next 13 years. She was released from prison in February 1985, along with another group of political prisoners. Around this time, she had a daughter named Rosario with her partner. Later, her second child, Pedro, was born.

Her debut novel, Oblivion, won the Casa de las Américas Literary Prize for testimonial literature in 2007. Some of her short stories have been included in Memorias para armar II (2000) and Exilios y tangueces (2009). She works for various periodicals and has been a contributor to the weekly newspaper Brecha since 2000.

== Selected works ==
=== Books ===
- Oblivion (Havana, Casa de las Américas, 2007)

=== Articles ===
- "Cometa en Montevideo" (Montevideo, 2007)
- "Fabular un país, testimoniar una literatura" (Panel presentation, Casa de las Américas, Havana, January 29, 2013)

== Awards and honours ==
- Casa de las Américas Prize (2007)
