= An Arsonist's Guide to Writers' Homes in New England =

2007 novel by Brock Clarke

An Arsonist's Guide to Writers' Homes in New England is a 2007 novel by Brock Clarke.

== Plot ==
The novel centers on a man who accidentally burns down the home of Emily Dickinson, and in the process, kills a couple who were making love in her bed:

I, Sam Pulsifer, am the man who accidentally burned down the Emily Dickinson House in Amherst, Massachusetts, and in the process killed two people, for which I spent ten years in prison ... It's probably enough to say that in the Massachusetts Mt. Rushmore of big, gruesome tragedy, there are the Kennedys, and Lizzie Borden and her ax, and the burning witches of Salem, and then there's me.

During his years in prison, he and his family receive large amounts of fan mail asking that he also burn down other famous literary homes, such as those of Mark Twain and Nathaniel Hawthorne. After his release, someone unknown begins to do just that, with the hero being forced to find out who is trying to frame him by destroying the homes of celebrated writers.

== Reception ==
The book received favorable reviews in the mainstream press on both sides of the Atlantic.

== Publication details ==
- Clarke, Brock (September 4, 2007). An Arsonist's Guide to Writers' Homes in New England. Algonquin Books. ISBN 978-1565125513.
