= Scott Lynch =

American fantasy writer (born 1978)

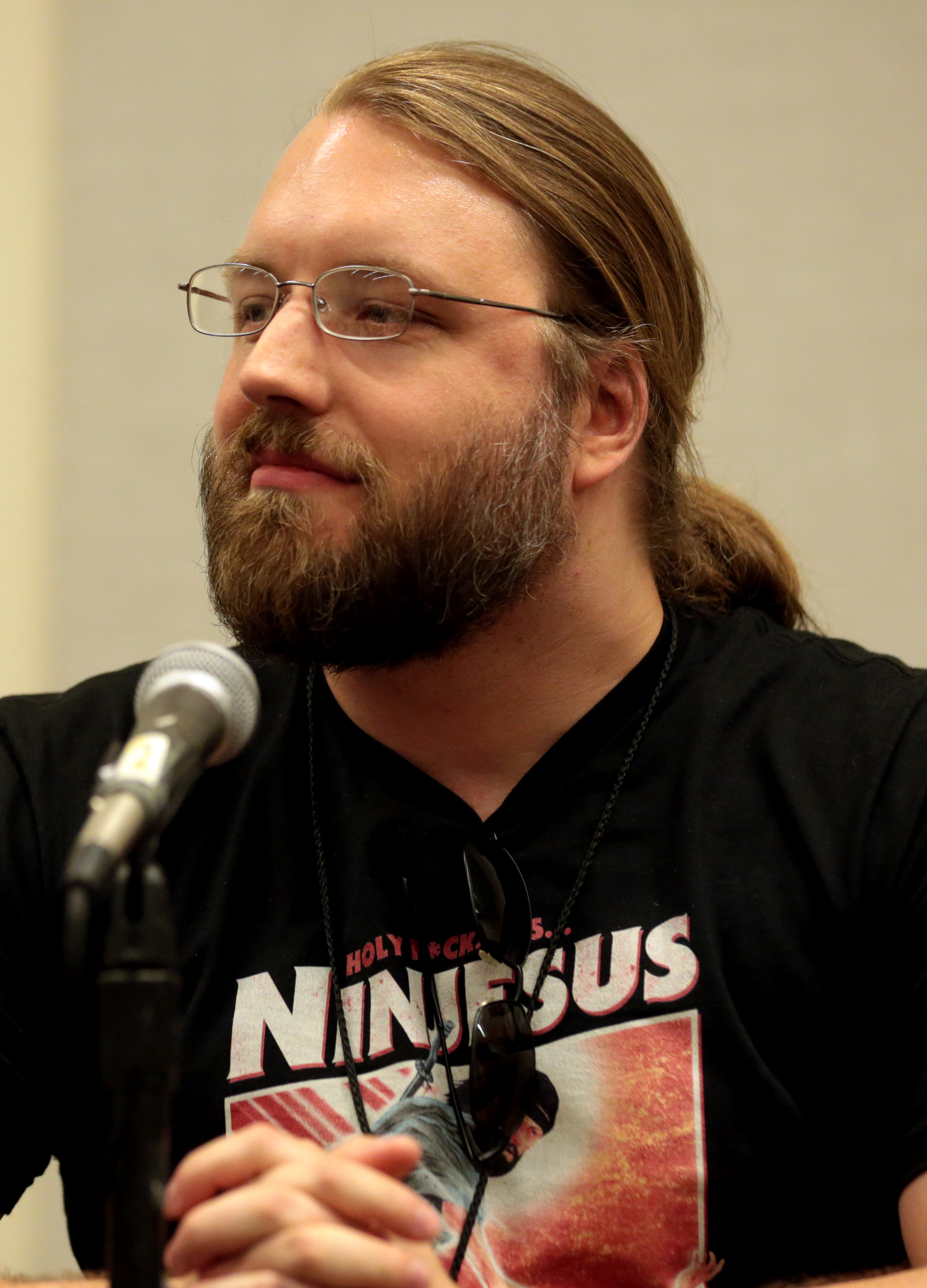
- Lynch at the 2017 Phoenix Comicon
- Born: April 2, 1978 (age 48); Saint Paul, Minnesota, U.S.
- Occupation: Novelist
- Spouse(s): Jenny Lynch (m. 2006; div. 2010) Elizabeth Bear (m. 2016)
- Writing career
- Genre: Fantasy
- Notable works: The Lies of Locke Lamora (2006); Red Seas Under Red Skies (2007); The Republic of Thieves (2013)
- Website: Official website

Scott Lynch (born April 2, 1978) is an American fantasy author, best known for the Gentleman Bastard Sequence series of novels. His first novel, The Lies of Locke Lamora, was purchased by Orion Books in August 2004 and published in June 2006 under the Gollancz imprint in the United Kingdom and under the Bantam imprint in the United States. The next two novels in the series, Red Seas Under Red Skies and The Republic of Thieves, were published in 2007 and 2013, respectively. The planned fourth of seven books in the series will be The Thorn of Emberlain.

== Career ==
Lynch's debut novel, The Lies of Locke Lamora, was a World Fantasy Award finalist in 2007. In 2007 and 2008 Lynch was nominated for the John W. Campbell Award for Best New Writer.

Lynch received the Sydney J. Bounds Best Newcomer Award from the British Fantasy Society in 2008.

== Biography ==
Lynch was born in Saint Paul, Minnesota, on April 2, 1978, and is the eldest of three brothers. He spent his early life in the Minneapolis–Saint Paul area. In 2004, he moved to New Richmond, Wisconsin, and in 2016 he moved to Massachusetts.

The Lies of Locke Lamora, Lynch's first novel, was bought by Simon Spanton at Orion Books in August, 2004 and published in June, 2006. Prior to that he worked at different jobs: dishwasher, busboy, waiter, web designer, office manager, prep cook, and freelance writer.

Lynch's second novel, Red Seas Under Red Skies, was published in 2007, and his third, The Republic of Thieves, was published in 2013. They, together with the forthcoming The Thorn of Emberlain and its sequels, comprise the Gentleman Bastard Sequence.

Lynch has a background in firefighting and emergency services. He was initially trained and certified as a firefighter at Anoka Technical College in Minnesota in 2005, and from 2005 to 2016 he was a paid-on-call firefighter for the city of New Richmond, Wisconsin.

Lynch married his first wife, Jenny, in August 2006; they divorced in April 2010. In October 2016 he married Elizabeth Bear, another fantasy writer.

== Books ==
=== Gentleman Bastard Sequence ===
1. The Lies of Locke Lamora (June 27, 2006)
2. Red Seas Under Red Skies (June 20, 2007)
3. The Republic of Thieves (October 8, 2013)

In October 2024, the first half of the short story "Locke Lamora and the Bottled Serpent" was published in Grimdark Magazine #40, with the remainder published in #41 in January 2025.

==== Planned works in the series ====
The Thorn of Emberlain, The Ministry of Necessity, The Mage and the Master Spy and Inherit the Night are projected to conclude the series. Three novellas are also projected: "More Than Fools Fill Graves", "The Mad Baron's Mechanical Attic", and "The Choir of Knives".

===== Overview =====
The series takes place in the world of the shattered Therin Throne Empire and its successor states. It follows the life of the young professional thief and con artist Locke Lamora. The world described has a society and technology analogous to that of 16th or 17th century, but with some differences. It has considerable gender equality, crossbows in place of even rudimentary firearms, functional alchemy and magic.

Lynch has described each novel of the series as "[covering] what you might call a different general situation" with "the same characters getting into trouble but the backdrop changes."

=== Queen of the Iron Sands ===
In August 2009 Lynch began to publish the online novel Queen of the Iron Sands, a planetary romance, in the style of Edgar Rice Burroughs' Barsoom novels. The story concerns a female aviator and ex-WASP who is transported to a fantastic Mars. Chapters were scheduled to be released weekly. The serialization ran until September 2009 and picked up in June 2010 and halted again in September 2012.

== Selected awards and honors ==
| Year | Organization | Award title, Category | Work | Result | Refs |
|---|---|---|---|---|---|
| 2007 | World Fantasy Convention | World Fantasy Awards, Novel | The Lies of Locke Lamora | Nominated | |
| 2007 | British Fantasy Society | British Fantasy Awards, August Derleth Fantasy Award (Novel) | The Lies of Locke Lamora | Nominated | |
| 2007 | Locus | Locus Award; First Novel | The Lies of Locke Lamora | Nominated | |
| 2007 | Locus | Locus Award; Fantasy Novel | The Lies of Locke Lamora | Nominated | |
| 2008 | British Fantasy Society | British Fantasy Awards, Sydney J. Bounds Award for Best Newcomer | N/A | Won | |
| 2014 | Locus | Locus Award; Fantasy Novel | The Republic of Thieves | Nominated | |
