= Such A Pretty Girl =

2007 novel by Laura Wiess

- Author: Laura Wiess
- Language: English
- Subject: child molestation, sexual abuse
- Genre: Fiction, young adult
- Publisher: MTV Books
- Publication date: January 2, 2007
- Publication place: United States
- Media type: Print (paperback), e-book, audiobook
- Pages: 212 pages
- ISBN: 1416521836

Such A Pretty Girl is a 2007 young adult novel by American author Laura Wiess. The book was first published on January 2, 2007 through MTV Books and deals with the subject matter of a teenage girl that must deal with the reality that the father that molested and sexually abused her and several others is getting an early release from jail.

After Such A Pretty Girl's release in 2007, Weiss has received several letters from people of various ages relating their experiences with sexual abuse. Weiss stated that she was inspired to write the novel after viewing a news program about sexual abuse that used the term "offenders", which she felt "minimized the abuse perpetrated".

== Synopsis ==
The story takes place over a time span of 3 days, and set in Estertown, a fictional town in New Jersey. The story begins with Charles, Meredith's father in jail for molesting children. Though he was sentenced to nine years, he is released after only three. Though her mother, Sharon, is thrilled, Meredith is horrified because she knows he will molest her again. Sharon pretends that Charles simply made a mistake and arranges for them to live near him. The whole town avoids Meredith's family because they know Charles may try to hurt their children, with some businesses even refusing them service. In order to escape Charles, Meredith attempts to run away several times. The first time, she ran away to her boyfriend Andy's house. Andy is 19 and is paralyzed since the night he graduated high school. He and his religious mother are planning to go to Iowa to meet the victim's soul to cleanse him in the next couple of days. The second time, she went to her mother's mom's house, who is Mayor. Later in the book, Meredith and Nigel, one of her friends who is a police officer, plan to catch her father . They set cameras all around the house, especially in her room. This is a very big help because Meredith's father tried to hurt her while her mother left them alone together. To save herself, Meredith takes a Virgin Mary statue and hits her father with it, rendering him paralyzed.

In the aftermath of the attack, her mom is confirmed to be pregnant and spent the following days by Charles' side in the hospital. Meredith is safe again and now lives at her grandmother's.

== Reception ==
Critical reception for Such A Pretty Girl has been positive. The novel was named as one of the ALA's 2008 "Best Books for Young Adults" and YALSA's 2008 "Quick Picks for Reluctant Young Adult Readers". Trade reviews from School Library Journal, Kirkus Reviews, and Booklist praised the book's content and handling of the theme of sexual abuse. Such A Pretty Girl also received several reviews from Kliatt, which also praised the book's themes.
