= Eye of the Moon =

Children's historical novel

- Author: Dianne Hofmeyr
- Illustrator: Larry Rostant
- Cover artist: Karin Paprocki
- Language: English
- Genre: Historical fiction
- Set in: Ancient Egypt
- Publisher: Simon & Schuster
- Publication date: 2007
- Publication place: Great Britain
- Media type: Print
- Pages: 336
- ISBN: 978-1-4424-1188-3 (paperback), 978-1-4424-1189-0 (ebook)
- OCLC: 76363925
- Followed by: Eye of the Sun

Eye of the Moon is a children's historical novel set in ancient Egypt, written by Dianne Hofmeyr and published in 2007. In the story, Isikara, daughter of the embalmer at the temple of Sobek, runs away with Tuthmosis, the son of King Amenhotep III. The main characters run from Wosret, the highest of high priests, who wants them dead.

== Plot ==
Isikara and her brother Katep lived in the temple of Sobek in Thebes with their father, Henuka. One day, Katep was bitten by a crocodile, reducing his arm to a mutilated stump. Frustrated that he was useless in the temple, he left Egypt.

Later, the royal barge of Queen Tiy visited the temple. However, high priest Wosret was sitting on the throne instead of the queen. Apparently, she and her eldest son Tuthmosis died, and Wosret came to request their mummification at the temple.

Isikara eavesdropped on the conversation between her father and Wosret. She discovered that Wosret poisoned Tuthmosis so that his younger brother could rule, and that the assassination attempt was unsuccessful. Henuka refused to stab Tuthmosis's heart with a needle to ensure his death. Isikara accidentally knocked over one of Queen Tiy's canopic jars, causing Wosret to discover her eavesdropping.

With discreet assistance from her father, Isikara escaped with Tuthmosis through a secret passageway. The two used a senet board to navigate the tunnel, which led them through Tuthmosis's father's burial chamber and to the tomb's exit. Tuthmosis sought the help of a Nubian girl named Ta Miu, who provided them with supplies. Isakara and Tuthmosis disguised themselves as peasants, repeatedly avoiding detection by Wosret while escaping to the desert.

While in the desert, they were captured by Medjay nomads, who brought them to their camp at an oasis. There, Isikara and Tuthmosis met a rebellious girl named Anoukhet, who had a plan for them to escape together with an old camel tender. The escape did not go as planned, resulting in Isikara attacking and accidentally killing the nomads' leader, Naqada, before escaping. The group arrived at Syene, where the camel tender departed from the others. Anoukhet secured the remaining trio a delivery job, and they journeyed south.

As the three approached Nubia, Tuthmosis planned to ally with the Kushites by promising peace from Egypt if they helped him regain his throne. They encountered the Kushite army and saw Katep, who had been promoted to phalanx leader for saving the former commander from drowning. The army accepted the girls due to Anoukhet's archery skills, and Isikara became a fletcher.

One day, the Egyptian army approached. When the Kushite soldiers went to battle, Isikara followed but failed to catch up. She was captured by Egyptian soldiers and used as a human shield by one of their charioteers. Anoukhet saved her from being struck by her own arrows by shooting her captor. However, the two were captured again while trying to escape the fray. The Egyptian army cut off Anoukhet's bow fingers. Isikara protested, resulting in her fingers being cut off as well.

While the Egyptian army celebrated, believing the Kushites had surrendered, Tuthmosis appeared and told the Egyptians his story. The Egyptian commander was unsympathetic and called the prince a traitor for hiding among the Kushites. In response, Katep shot at the commander's feet. Tuthmosis revealed that each of the Egyptian soldiers has an arrow aimed at him. The commander was shot in the heart, and the Kushites were victorious soon after.

Anoukhet was furious Tuthmosis did not attempt to regain his territory. Tuthmosis replied that he did not want his country to be ruled by fear or bloodshed. He planned to return to Thebes soon.

== Reception ==
Critical reception has been mostly positive. Eye of the Moon received reviews from the School Library Journal, Library Media Connection, and Children's Literature. School Library Journal commented that "the landscape...is described in rich sensory terms". Library Media Connection described the book as "packed with information" and "sure to appeal". Children's Literature commented that "the complex names and customs may be too overwhelming for less proficient readers".
