= Genesis Redux =

2007 book edited by Jessica Riskin

Genesis Redux: Essays in the History and Philosophy of Artificial Life
- First edition
- Editor: Jessica Riskin
- Language: English
- Subject: Non-fiction, Automatons, Artificial Intelligence
- Published: 2007 (University of Chicago Press)
- Publication place: United States
- Media type: Print (hardback, paperback)
- Pages: 389
- ISBN: 9780226720807
- OCLC: 80917572

Genesis Redux: Essays in the History and Philosophy of Artificial Life is a 2007 book edited by Jessica Riskin. It is a collection of essays about the history of the making of mechanicals in an attempt to emulate or recreate life.

== Reception ==
Genesis Redux has been reviewed by the Annals of Science, Nature, The British Journal for the History of Science, and The American Historical Review.
