= Page 99 test =

Literature evaluation method

The Page 99 test is a method of evaluating a work of fiction suggested by literary critic Ford Madox Ford. Ford suggested that prospective readers open a book and read page 99 to gain a sense of how well written the work is while avoiding any back-cover synopsis or the first few pages, as these are typically given extra attention during editing and may not reflect the quality of the book as a whole.
