= Edna Staebler Award =

Canadian literary award

- Awarded for: the best creative non-fiction book with Canadian significance by a new Canadian writer
- Sponsored by: An Edna Staebler financial endowment
- Country: Canada
- Presented by: Faculty of Arts, Wilfrid Laurier University
- Reward: C$10,000
- First award: 1991
- Website: Edna Staebler Awards for Creative Non-Fiction

The Edna Staebler Award for Creative Non-Fiction is an annual literary award recognizing the previous year's best creative nonfiction book with a "Canadian locale and/or significance" that is a Canadian writer's "first or second published book of any type or genre". It was established by an endowment from Edna Staebler, a literary journalist best known for cookbooks, and was inaugurated in 1991 for publication year 1990. The award is administered by Wilfrid Laurier University's Faculty of Arts. Only submitted books are considered.

For purposes of the award, "Creative non-fiction is literary not journalistic. The writer does not merely give information but intimately shares an experience with the reader by telling a factual story using the devices of fiction ... Rather than emphasizing objectivity, the book should have feeling, and should be a compelling, engaging read."

== Recipients ==
The panel may "grant or withhold the award in any year." In fact the award has been granted every year and there were two winners in 1993 (published 1992).

In the 2020s, the awards were postponed for several years due to the COVID-19 pandemic in Canada. The nominees for 2020 were announced in July 2022, with the winner to be announced in August, and the nominees for 2021 are expected later in the year. Following postponement during the pandemic, a shortlist of nominees was announced on May 18, 2023.

=== 1990s ===
Edna Staebler Award recipients (1991-1999)
Year	Author	Title	Result	Ref.
1991	Susan Mayse	Ginger: The Life and Death of Albert Goodwin	Winner	
1992	Marie Wadden	Nitassinan: The Innu Struggle to Reclaim Their Homeland	Winner	
1992	Phil Jenkins	Fields of Vision: A Journey to Canada's Family Farms	Shortlist	
1992	Anne Kershaw and Mary Lasovich	Rock-a-bye Baby: A Death Behind Bars	Shortlist	
1992	Sherrill MacLaren	Invisible Power: The Women Who Run Canada	Shortlist	
1992	Marlene Webber	Street Kids: The Tragedy of Canada's Runaways	Shortlist	
1993	Liza Potvin	White Lies (for my mother)	Winner	
1993	Elizabeth Hay	The Only Snow in Havana	Winner	
1994	Linda Johns	Sharing a Robin's Life	Winner	
1995	Denise Chong	The Concubine's Children	Winner	
1995	Rosalind MacPhee	Picasso's Woman: A Breast Cancer Story	Shortlist	
1995	Jack Kuper	After the Smoke Cleared	Shortlist	
1995	Rita Moir	Survival Gear	Shortlist	
1996	George G. Blackburn	The Guns of Normandy	Winner	
1996	Patricia Pitcher	Artists, Craftsmen and Technocrats: The Dreams, Realities and Illusions of Leadership	Shortlist	
1996	Tom Connors	Stompin' Tom: Before the Fame	Shortlist	
1996	Frances Backhouse	Women of the Klondike	Shortlist	
1997	Anne Mullens	Timely Death	Winner	
1997	William Aide	Starting from Porcupine	Shortlist	
1997	Phil Jenkins	An Acre of Time: The Enduring Value of Place	Shortlist	
1997	Douglas Chambers	Stony Ground: The Making of a Canadian Garden	Shortlist	
1998	Charlotte Gray	Mrs. King	Winner	
1998	Elisabeth Raab	And Peace Never Came	Shortlist	
1998	Lois Sweet	God in the Classroom: The Controversial Issue of Religion in Canada's Schools	Shortlist	
1998	A. C. Lewis	Nahanni Remembered	Shortlist	
1999	Michael Poole	Romancing Mary Jane	Winner	
1999	Will Ferguson	I Was a Teenage Katima-Victim: A Canadian Odyssey	Shortlist	
1999	James Mahar and Rowena Mahar	Too Many to Mourn: One Family's Tragedy in the Halifax Explosion	Shortlist	
1999	Jori Smith	Charlevoix County: 1930	Shortlist	

=== 2000s ===
Edna Staebler Award recipients (2000-2009)
Year	Author	Title	Result	Ref.
2000	Wayson Choy	Paper Shadows	Winner	
2000	Beth Powning	Shadow Child: An Apprenticeship in Love and Loss	Shortlist	
2000	Ellen Stafford	Always and After	Shortlist	
2000	Kevin Patterson	The Water in Between: A Journey at Sea	Shortlist	
2000	Andrew Steinmetz	Wardlife: The Apprenticeship of a Young Writer as a Hospital Clerk	Shortlist	
2001	Taras Grescoe	Sacré Blues	Winner	
2001	Howard Hewer	In for a Penny, In for a Pound: The Adventures and Misadventures of a Wireless Operator in Bomber Command	Shortlist	
2001	Mary Pratt	Mary Pratt: A Personal Calligraphy	Shortlist	
2001	Trevor Herriot	River in a Dry Land: A Prairie Passage	Shortlist	
2002	Tom Allen	Rolling Home: A Cross Canada Railroad Memoir	Winner	
2002	Nicholas Pashley	Notes on a Beermat: Drinking and Why It's Necessary	Shortlist	
2002	Gabriel Bauer	Waltzing the Tango: Confessions of an Out-of-Step Boomer	Shortlist	
2002	Ron Corbett	Last Guide: A Story of Fish and Love The	Shortlist	
2002	Cornelia Johanna Baines	Under Syndenham Skies: A Celebration of Country Life	Shortlist	
2003	Alison Watt	The Last Island	Winner	
2003	Peter McSherry	Mean Streets: Confessions of a Night-Time Taxi Driver	Shortlist	
2003	Adam Killick	Racing the White Silence: On The Trail of the Yukon Quest	Shortlist	
2003	Dawn Rae Downton	Seldom: A Memoir	Shortlist	
2004	Andrea Curtis	Into the Blue	Winner	
2004	Ellen Bielawski	Rogue Diamonds: The Rush for Northern Riches on Dene Land	Shortlist	
2004	Kevin Bazzana	Wondrous Strange: The Life and Art of Glenn Gould	Shortlist	
2004	Ralph Osborne	From Somewhere Else	Shortlist	
2004	Alex M. Hall	Discovering Eden: A Lifetime of Paddling Arctic Rivers	Shortlist	
2005	Anne Coleman	I'll Tell You a Secret	Winner	
2005	Tilda Shalof	A Nurse's Story: Life, Death and In-Between in an Intensive Care Unit	Shortlist	
2005	Geoff Heinricks	A Fool and Forty Acres: Conjuring a Vineyard Three Thousand Miles from Burgundy	Shortlist	
2005	Elizabeth Hudson	Snow Bodies: One Woman’s Life on the Streets	Shortlist	
2005	Michael Mitchell	The Molly Fire	Shortlist	
2006	Francis Chalifour	After	Winner	
2006	Lisa Rochon	Up North	Shortlist	
2006	Rosalind B. Penfold	Dragonslippers: This is What an Abusive Relationship Can Look Like	Shortlist	
2006	John Vaillant	The Golden Spruce: A True Story of Myth, Madness and Greed	Shortlist	
2006	Kim Bolan	Loss of Faith: How the Air-India Bombers Got Away with Murder	Shortlist	
2007	Linden MacIntyre	Causeway: A Passage from Innocence	Winner	
2007	Marcello Di Cintio	Poets & Pahlevans: A Journey into the Heart of Iran	Shortlist	
2007	Rachel Lebowitz	Hannus	Shortlist	
2007	Patrick Friesen	Interim Essays & Mediations	Shortlist	
2008	Bruce Serafin	Stardust	Winner	
2008	Nathan M. Greenfield	Baptism of Fire: The Second Battle of Ypres and the Forging of Canada, April 1915	Shortlist	
2008	Chantal Hébert	French Kiss: Stephen Harper’s Blind Date with Quebec	Shortlist	
2008	Jane Hall	The Red Wall: A Woman in the RCMP	Shortlist	
2009	Russell Wangersky	Burning Down the House: Fighting Fires and Losing Myself	Winner	
2009	Martin Mitchinson	The Darien Gap: Travels in the Rainforest of Panama	Shortlist	
2009	Cathy Ostlere	Lost: A Memoir	Shortlist	
2009	Andrew Westoll	The Riverbones: Stumbling After Eden in the Jungles of Suriname	Shortlist	

=== 2010s ===
Edna Staebler Award recipients (2010-2019)
Year	Author	Title	Result	Ref.
2010	John Leigh Walters	A Very Capable Life	Winner	
2010	Allan Casey	Lakeland: Journeys into the Soul of Canada	Shortlist	
2010	Else Poulsen	Smiling Bears: A Zookeeper Explores the Behaviour and Emotional Life of Bears	Shortlist	
2011	Helen Waldstein Wilkes	Letters from the Lost	Winner	
2011	Benjamin Errett	Jew and Improved: How Choosing to be Chosen Made Me a Better Man	Shortlist	
2011	Grant Lawrence	Adventures in Solitude: What Not to Wear to a Nude Potluck and Other Stories from Desolation Sound	Shortlist	
2012	Joshua Knelman	Hot Art	Winner	
2012	Robyn Michele Levy	Most of Me: Surviving My Medical Meltdown	Shortlist	
2012	Andrew Westoll	The Chimps of Fauna Sanctuary: A Canadian Story of Resilience and Recovery	Shortlist	
2013	Carol Shaben	Into the Abyss	Winner	
2013	Kamal Al-Solaylee	Intolerable: A Memoir of Extremes	Shortlist	
2013	Nahlah Ayed	A Thousand Farewells: A Reporter’s Journey from Refugee Camp to the Arab Spring		
2014	Arno Kopecky	The Oil Man and the Sea: Navigating the Northern Gateway	Winner	
2014	Allen Smutylo	The Memory of Water	Shortlist	
2014	Alison Wearing	Confessions of a Fairy’s Daughter: Growing Up with a Gay Dad	Shortlist	
2015	Lynn Thomson	Birding with Yeats	Winner	
2015	Judy McFarlane	Writing with Grace: A Journey Beyond Down Syndrome	Shortlist	
2015	Mark Sakamoto	Forgiveness: A Gift From My Grandparents	Shortlist	
2016	Ann Walmsley	The Prison Book Club	Winner	
2016	Lorimer Shenher	That Lonely Section of Hell: The Botched Investigation of a Serial Killer Who Almost Got Away	Shortlist	
2016	Sheila Watt-Cloutier	The Right to Be Cold: One Woman’s Story of Protecting Her Culture, the Arctic and the Whole Planet	Shortlist	
2017	Sonja Larsen	Red Star Tattoo	Winner	
2017	Duncan McCue	The Shoe Boy	Shortlist	
2017	Rajiv Surendra	The Elephants in My Backyard	Shortlist	
2018	Pauline Dakin	Run, Hide, Repeat: A Memoir of a Fugitive Childhood	Winner	
2018	James Maskalyk	Life on the Ground Floor	Shortlist	
2018	Adam Shoalts	A History of Canada in Ten Maps	Shortlist	
2019	Kate Harris	Lands of Lost Borders: Out of Bounds on the Silk Road	Winner	
2019	Daemon Fairless	Mad Blood Stirring	Shortlist	
2019	Terese Marie Mailhot	Heart Berries: A Memoir	Shortlist	

=== 2020s ===
Edna Staebler Award recipients (2020-2029)
Year	Author	Title	Result	Ref.
2020	Ann Hui	Chop Suey Nation	Winner	
2020	Samra Habib	We Have Always Been Here	Shortlist	
2020	John Zada	In the Valleys of the Noble Beyond	Shortlist	
2021	Vicki Laveau-Harvie	The Erratics: A Memoir	Winner	
2021	Jessica J. Lee	Two Trees Make a Forest: In Search of My Family's Past Among Taiwan's Mountains and Coasts	Shortlist	
2021	Rachel Matlow	Dead Mom Walking: A Memoir of Miracle Cures and Other Disasters	Shortlist	
2022	Jillian Horton	We Are All Perfectly Fine: A Memoir of Love, Medicine and Healing	Winner	
2023	Hilary Peach	Thick Skin: Field Notes from a Sister in the Brotherhood	Winner	
2023	Cody Caetano	Half-Bads in White Regalia	Shortlist	
2024	Brett Popplewell	Outsider: An Old Man, a Mountain, and the Search for a Hidden Past	Winner	
2024	Karen Pinchin	Kings of Their Own Ocean: Tuna, Obsession, and the Future of Our Seas	Shortlist	
2024	Josie Teed	British Columbiana: A Millennial in a Gold Rush Town	Shortlist	
2025	Aaron Williams	The Last Logging Show: A Forestry Family at the End of an Era	Winner	
2025	Martin Bauman	Hell of a Ride: Chasing Home and Survival on a Bicycle Voyage Across Canada	Shortlist	
