= Most of Me =

Most of Me: Surviving My Medical Meltdown
- First edition cover of Canadian release
- Author: Robyn Michele Levy
- Subject: Medical diagnosis
- Genre: Non-fiction, memoir
- Publisher: Greystone Books
- Publication date: September 9, 2011
- Publication place: Canada
- Media type: Print (hardcover & paperback)
- Pages: 256
- ISBN: 9781553656326

Most of Me: Surviving My Medical Meltdown is a non-fiction memoir, written by Canadian writer Robyn Michele Levy, first published in September 2011 by Greystone Books. In the book, the author chronicles her plight from symptoms, to medical diagnosis, and coping with simultaneous illnesses.

== Awards and honours ==
Most of Me was a nominee for the Stephen Leacock Memorial Medal for Humour in June 2012, for "the best in Canadian humour writing". The book also received shortlist recognition for the 2012 Edna Staebler Award for Creative Non-Fiction.

== See also ==
- List of Edna Staebler Award recipients
