= Jew and Improved =

2010 book by 'Benjamin Errett'

Jew and Improved: How Choosing To Be Chosen Made Me A Better Man
- First edition cover of Canadian release
- Author: 'Benjamin Errett'
- Subject: Religious sojourn
- Genre: non-fiction, memoir
- Publisher: HarperCollins
- Publication date: June 1, 2010
- Publication place: Canada
- Media type: Print (hardback and paperback)
- Pages: 272 pp.
- ISBN: 9781554684274

Jew and Improved: How Choosing To Be Chosen Made Me A Better Man is a 2010 non-fiction book by Canadian writer Benjamin Errett. It was first published in June 2010 by HarperCollins and chronicles Errett's conversion to Judaism after becoming engaged to a Jewish woman.

== Synopsis ==
The book follows Errett as he decides to convert to Judaism after asking his girlfriend to marry him. During the process Errett deals with the changes to his lifestyle and the surprises that conversion brings.

== Reception ==
The Quill & Quire gave an overall negative review, writing that the book "comes off as merely shmaltzy" and "though tasty, has little sustaining value". In contrast, the Winnipeg Free Press praised the book as "light and likable".

On the CBC Radio show The Next Chapter with Shelagh Rogers, Toronto writer Catherine Gildiner calls the book the "Story of goy meets girl" and finds it carefree, witty and lighthearted with many funny one-liners, praising Errett's "turn of phrase" and comparing him to Jonathan Goldstein. On the other hand, Gildiner criticises him for downplaying the issues associated with his experiences and for not clarifying for his readers the reasons behind his conversion.

In an interview, his wife stated that his perspective on Judaism has not affected her work overtly, but since they exchange ideas and work together, even when on individual projects, her husband's ideas may have influenced her sensibilities. In the same interview, his wife revealed that she had read his book 35 times, a fact she considers may have further influenced her ideas. In the same interview, she also stated about her husband that "also, for a new Jew he has old soul Borscht Belt wit, which lends itself very well to comics".

=== Awards and honours ===
Jew and Improved received shortlist recognition for the 2011 "Edna Staebler Award for Creative Non-Fiction".
