= Nitassinan: The Innu Struggle to Reclaim Their Homeland =

1991 non-fiction book by Marie Wadden

- First edition cover of Canadian release
- Author: Marie Wadden
- Subject: The plight of Indigenous peoples
- Genre: non-fiction, book
- Publisher: Douglas & McIntyre
- Publication date: December 1991
- Publication place: Canada
- Media type: Print (hardback and paperback)
- Pages: 218 pp.
- ISBN: 9781550540017

Nitassinan: The Innu Struggle to Reclaim Their Homeland is a non-fiction book, written by Canadian writer Marie Wadden, first published in December 1991 by Douglas & McIntyre. In the book, the author chronicles the plight of the Innu people, indigenous inhabitants of an area they affectionately call "Nitassinan" which means "our land" in the Innu language.

== Awards and honours ==
Nitassinan received the 1992 "Edna Staebler Award for Creative Non-Fiction". The author has written a second book entitled "Where the Pavement Ends, the Aboriginal Recovery Movement and the Urgent Need for Reconciliation", published in 2008 by Douglas & McIntyre and nominated for three awards, including the Shaughnessy Cohen Prize for Political Writing.

== See also ==
- List of Edna Staebler Award recipients
