= Hot Art =

2011 non-fiction book by Joshua Knelman

Hot Art: Chasing Thieves and Detectives through the Secret World of Stolen Art
- First edition cover of Canadian release
- Author: Joshua Knelman
- Subject: True crime
- Genre: non-fiction, book
- Publisher: Douglas & McIntyre
- Publication date: September 2, 2011
- Publication place: Canada
- Media type: Print (hardback and paperback)
- Pages: 316 pp.
- ISBN: 9781553658917

Hot Art: Chasing Thieves and Detectives through the Secret World of Stolen Art is a non-fiction book, written by Canadian writer Joshua Knelman, first published in September 2011 by Douglas & McIntyre. In the book, the author chronicles his four-year investigation into the world of international art theft. Knelman traveled from Cairo to New York City, London, Montreal, and Los Angeles compiling his book; which has been called "A major work of investigative journalism", and "a globetrotting mystery filled with cunning and eccentric characters."

== Awards and honours ==
Hot Art received the 2012 Arthur Ellis Award for Best Crime Nonfiction. The book also received the 2012 Edna Staebler Award for Creative Non-Fiction.

== See also ==
- List of Edna Staebler Award recipients
