= Potvin =

Potvin is a surname. Notable people with the surname include:

- Bryan Potvin, Canadian singer-songwriter and guitarist and band member of The Northern Pikes
- Denis Potvin (born 1953), former defenceman and team captain for the New York Islanders in the National Hockey League
- Félix Potvin (born 1971), retired National Hockey League goaltender
- Jean Potvin (born 1949), retired Canadian professional ice hockey defenceman
- Kevin Potvin (born 1962), newspaper publisher and columnist, small business owner, and politician based in Vancouver, British Columbia
- Liza Potvin, Canadian novelist
- Marc Potvin (1967–2006), Canadian professional ice hockey player in the National Hockey League
- Roxanne Potvin (born 1982), bilingual Gatineau, Quebec-based singer, blues guitarist, songwriter and vocalist
