= Steve Burgess (author) =

Canadian author and journalist

- Born: August, 1958; Norwalk, Ohio, USA.
- Occupations: Author, freelance writer, broadcaster

Steve Burgess is a Vancouver-based writer and broadcaster. He is the author of Who Killed Mom? A Delinquent Son's Meditation on Family, Mortality, and Very Tacky Candles (Greystone), Reservations: The Pleasures and Perils of Travel (Douglas & McIntyre), and Cheapskate in Lotusland: The Philosophy and Practice of Living Well on a Small Budget (Douglas & McIntyre).

Burgess has been a regular contributor to The Tyee.ca since its inception in 2004, where he currently writes the column Please Advise!. He was co-director of the Network Entertainment documentaries "I Am JFK Jr.", "Facing Putin", and "The Cowboy".

== Published works ==
- Who Killed Mom? A Delinquent Son's Meditation on Family, Mortality and Very Tacky Candles (2011)
- Reservations: The Pleasures and Perils of Travel (2024)
- Cheapskate in Lotusland: The Philosophy and Practice of Living Well on a Small Budget (2026)

== Awards ==
- National Magazine Award Silver Medal, Humour 1997: “A Band in All Hope,” Chatelaine
- National Magazine Award Silver Medal, Travel 1999: “That 70s Town,” Vancouver Magazine
- Jack Webster Community Mic Award 2022, Commentator of the Year
- Leo Award, Best Director of a Series Documentary 2016, “Facing Putin”
