= Lakeland: Journeys into the Soul of Canada =

Book by Allan Casey

- First edition cover of Canadian release
- Author: Allan Casey
- Subject: Lakes of Canada
- Genre: Nonfiction
- Publisher: Greystone Books
- Publication date: November 10, 2009
- Publication place: Canada
- Media type: Print (Hardcover & Paperback)
- Pages: 360 pp.
- ISBN: 9781553653080

Lakeland: Journeys into the Soul of Canada is a nonfiction book, written by Canadian writer Allan Casey, first published in November 2009 by Greystone Books. The book celebrates Canada's uniquely lake-rich landscape and explores the relationship that both the author and all Canadians have with this "Lakeland". In the book, the author chronicles his summer vacations to ten Canadian lakes. His tale begins at the cabin his father built on Saskatchewan's Emma Lake in 1960 and continues on a journey through ten of Canada's scenic lakes, extenuating their increasingly fragile existence as pristine lakes of Saskatchewan. It has been called an "extraordinary piece of writing", earning accolades of literary recognition.

== Awards and honours ==
Lakeland received the 2010 "Governor General's Award for nonfiction". The book also received shortlist recognition for the 2010 "Edna Staebler Award for Creative Non-Fiction".

== See also ==
- List of Edna Staebler Award recipients
