= Smiling Bears =

2009 book by Else Poulsen

Smiling Bears: A Zookeeper Explores the Behavior and Emotional Life of Bears
- First edition cover of Canadian release
- Author: Else Poulsen
- Subject: Animal cognition
- Publisher: Greystone Books
- Publication date: 5 May 2009
- Publication place: Canada
- Media type: Print (hardback and paperback)
- Pages: 272 pp.
- ISBN: 9781553653875

Smiling Bears: A Zookeeper Explores the Behavior and Emotional Life of Bears is a 2009 book by Canadian writer Else Poulsen, first published by Greystone Books. In the book, the author chronicles her insights gleaned as a zookeeper responsible for rehabilitating "bears in crisis". Jeffrey Moussaieff Masson called Smiling Bears "An inspiring trip into the minds and reality of bears."

== Awards and honours ==
Smiling Bears received shortlist recognition for the 2010 "Edna Staebler Award for Creative Non-Fiction".

== See also ==
- List of Edna Staebler Award recipients
