= The Will of the People: The Revolutionary Birth of America =

- First edition
- Author: T. H. Breen
- Publisher: Belknap Press
- Publication date: 2019
- Media type: Print (paperback)
- Pages: 272
- ISBN: 9780674251397

The Will of the People: The Revolutionary Birth of America is a non-fiction book by T. H. Breen published in 2019 by Belknap Press.

Based largely on research of historical records and memoirs, Breen’s assessment of the American War for Independence attributes the ultimate success of the revolution to the popular mobilization of ordinary British colonialists in the struggle more so than the Founding Fathers.

Breen places particular emphasis on the establishment of a “dual sovereignty" linking the Continental Congress and the committees of public safety through the legal instrument of “The Association.”.

Under the protocols of The Association, revolutionaries in local villages and towns served to sustain support for militant commercial restrictions and dispensed disciplinary action against Loyalist/Tory violators.

== Contents ==
Introduction: Revolutionary Voices

- Rejection
- Assurance
- Fear
- Justice
- Betrayal
- Revenge
- Reflections

== Reception ==
Gordon S. Wood on The Will of the People: “Important and lucidly written…The American Revolution involved not simply the wisdom of a few great men but the passions, fears, and religiosity of ordinary people.”

Michael J. Griffin at the Irish Journal of American Studies extols the “excellent research, the engaging stories of communal and popular resilience, and the brilliance and innovation of Breen’s bottom-up approach to American history.”

Describing the book as “elegantly written,” Times Literary Supplement reviewer Greenfield, Nathan M. detects an unstated theme in The Will of the People:

If Americans, across vast distances with limited communication, could come together to organize armies, deal with the fears of traitors, administer justice, ensure just prices and even reincorporate Tories at the end of the war, then surely…ways can be found to bridge today’s divisions.

Noting Breen’s exhaustive research of primary sources, Megan King at the Journal of the American Revolution emphasizes the originality of his interpretation.

Breen brings to the forefront the memories of those underappreciated Americans who made difficult decisions, crafted plans, and committed to sacrifices for the common good during the Revolutionary era…In making a significant contribution to the more recent historiographical trend of straying from an inflation of the Founding Fathers’ roles in the Revolution, this original and enlightening work will prove to be key for early Americanists of all levels.

== The influence of the Bible on revolutionary precepts ==
“[W]hat made the American Revolution truly revolutionary was the growing determination of newly empowered Americans to endorse a social contract based on community solidarity rather than unbridled individualism.”—T. H. Breen in The Will of the People (2019)

The Will of the People examines the role of revolutionary Protestant ministers who provided a Scriptural basis for colonial independence among their parishioners.

[M]inisters cited the Old Testament to show “that God expected ordinary Americans to rebel against tyranny.” Indeed, to “compromise with tyranny was not a political failing; it was sin.” For people much more conversant with the Bible than they were with Enlightenment thinkers…

Breen maintains that “Americans did not cast their argument for independence” in terms of the Enlightenment figures embraced by George Washington, John Adams and Thomas Jefferson and other revolutionary elites.

[I]f the Founding Fathers had been the sole force driving the revolution, it would have amounted to little more than a book club at Harvard. You’ve got to have the people. It’s hard to believe that the young farm boys marching to Bunker Hill were discussing the finer points of Montesquieu as they went into battle.

=== John Locke: a religious and revolutionary nexus ===
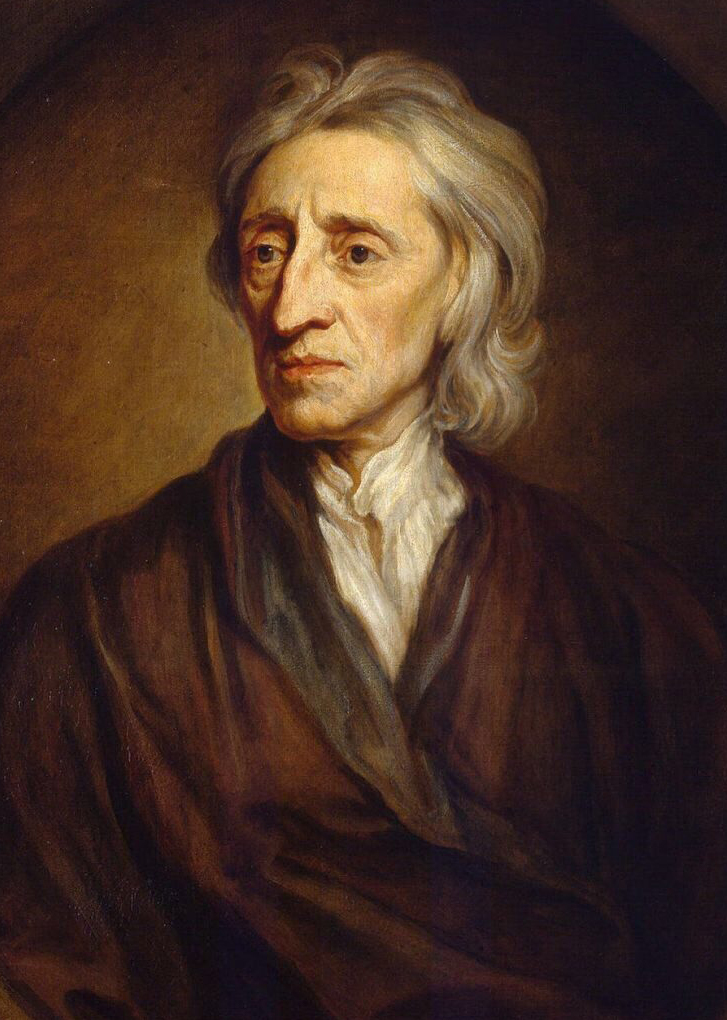
Portrait of John Locke (1632–1704) by Godfrey Kneller, 1697.

Breen seeks to reestablish the significance of English philosopher John Locke in inspiring popular revolutionary principles among American colonialists. Locke, who couched his revolutionary principles in religious terms, was familiar to colonialists through sermons and speeches widely attended by the colonial population.

Locke complemented beliefs already present in American society: that government is a compact, a contract between the people and their leaders for the common good, and when leaders fail, when they become tyrants and oppressive, then and only then are the people allowed to rise to violence…By putting it in religious terms—and Locke was very religious—it fed right into American society.

Breen adds that the first battle flag displayed by patriots clashing with British regulars near Boston in 1775 bore the words “An Appeal to Heaven,” a phrase from Locke’s Second Treatise (1689).

== Sources ==
- Breen, T. H.. 2019. The Will of the People: The Revolutionary Birth of America. Belknap Press, Cambridge, Massachusetts. ISBN 9780674251397
- Breen, T. H. 2010. “Whose Revolution is this.” The Washington Post, March 31, 2010.https://www.washingtonpost.com/wp-dyn/content/article/2010/03/30/AR2010033003252.html Accessed 10 August, 2026.
- Greenfield, Nathan M.. 2019. “Americans.” Review: The Will of the People by T. H. Breen. Times Literary Supplement, November 22, 2019.https://www.the-tls.com/regular-features/in-brief/americans Accessed 10 August, 2026.
- Griffin, Michael J. 2020. Review: T. H. Breen, The Will of the People: The Revolutionary Birth of America. Irish Journal of American Studies, December 18, 2020.https://ijas.iaas.ie/issue-10-michael-j-griffin/ Accessed August 10, 2026.
- King, Megan. 2019. Review: The Will of the People: The Revolutionary Birth of America. All Things Liberty in the Journal of the American Revolution (JAR), September 2019. https://allthingsliberty.com/2019/09/the-will-of-the-people-the-revolutionary-birth-of-america/
- Mackaman, Tom. 2026. “An interview with historian Timothy H. Breen on popular mobilization in the American Revolution.” World Socialist Web Site, August 4, 2026. https://www.wsws.org/en/articles/2026/08/04/ydzq-a04.html Accessed 10 August, 2026.
