= Romancing Mary Jane =

1998 book by Michael Poole

Romancing Mary Jane: A Year in the Life of a Failed Marijuana Grower
- First edition cover of Canadian release
- Author: Michael Poole
- Subject: Midlife crisis
- Genre: Non-fiction, book
- Publisher: Greystone Books
- Publication date: 1998
- Publication place: Canada
- Media type: Print (Hardcover & Paperback)
- Pages: 272 pp.
- ISBN: 9781550547498

Romancing Mary Jane: A Year in the Life of a Failed Marijuana Grower is a non-fiction book, written by Canadian writer Michael Poole, first published in 1998 by Greystone Books. In the book, the author chronicles the regrettable consequences of his decision to cultivate marijuana on a commercial level. Goodreads called the book, an "engaging blend of metaphysics, marijuana, and midlife crisis." A panel of Wilfrid Laurier University judges called Poole's writing, "sheer competence".

== Awards and honours ==
Romancing Mary Jane received the 1998 "Edna Staebler Award for Creative Non-Fiction".

== See also ==
- List of Edna Staebler Award recipients
- List of books about cannabis
