= Anne Vallée =

Canadian biologist

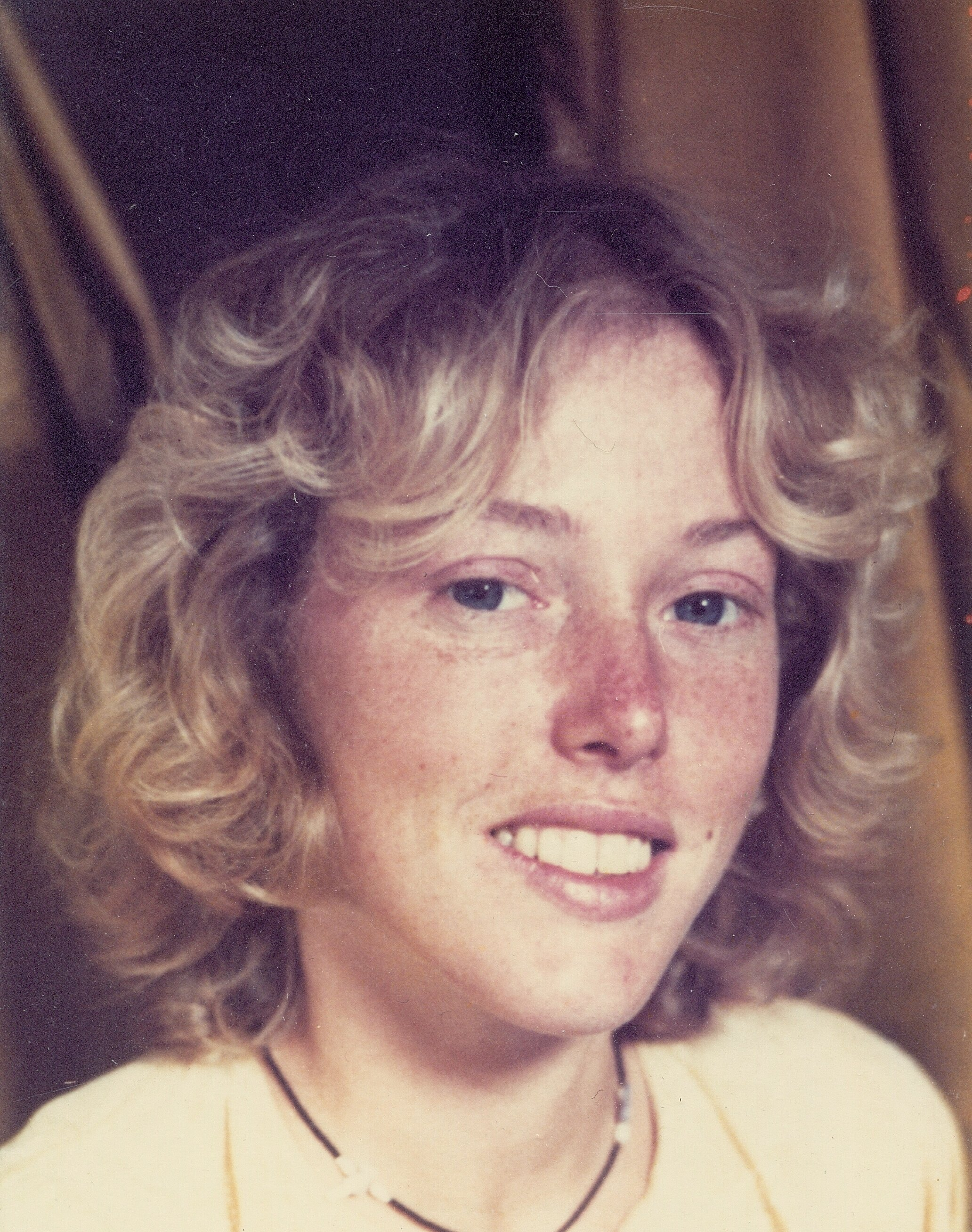
Anne Vallée

Anne Vallée (26 July 1958, Quebec City, Quebec, Canada - 31 July 1982, Triangle Island, British Columbia, Canada) was one of the first biologists to observe the impact of climate change on animal populations.

== Biography ==
Born in Quebec City, Anne Vallée completed in 1979 a bachelor's degree in biology at Laval University and took graduate studies at the University of British Columbia supported by a scholarship from the Natural Sciences and Engineering Research Council. She chose tufted puffins as a research subject and, starting in 1980, spent her summers on Triangle Island, an ecological reserve located in the Pacific Ocean west of the north tip of Vancouver Island. She died accidentally on Triangle Island during the summer of 1982. Her work was included in the paper of Gjerdrum et al. (2003).

Following her death, her family and friends created the Anne Vallée Ecological Fund, with the objective to "Support field research highlighting the problems of animal ecology in relation to human settlements and activities such as agriculture, forestry, fishing and tourism." From 1983 to 2011, 45 scholarships have been awarded to student researchers from Quebec and British Columbia universities.

In 1983, the British Columbia government renamed the Triangle Island Ecological reserve the Anne Vallée Triangle Island Ecological Reserve.

In 2002, Alison Watt published the book The Last Island, A Naturalist's Sojourn on Triangle Island, where she recalled her experience in the summer of 1980 when she assisted Anne Vallée in her research on tufted puffins. In 2003, this book won the Edna Staebler Award for creative non-fiction.

In 2006, in the process of street name harmonization following the fusion of suburbs with Quebec City, the Quebec City administration accepted the proposal of a group of citizens to rename rue Quatre-Saisons in the Sainte-Foy–Sillery borough to rue Anne-Vallée.
