= Ginger: The Life and Death of Albert Goodwin =

Susan Mayse non-fiction book

- First edition cover of Canadian release
- Author: Susan Mayse
- Subject: Organized labor
- Genre: non-fiction, book
- Publisher: Harbour Publishing
- Publication date: 1 January 1990
- Publication place: Canada
- Media type: Print (hardback and paperback)
- Pages: 212 pp., with index and bibliography
- ISBN: 9781550170184
- OCLC: 21672611
- Dewey Decimal: 331.88/122334/092
- LC Class: HD6525.G66

Ginger: The Life and Death of Albert Goodwin is a non-fiction book written by Canadian writer Susan Mayse; first published in January 1990, by Harbour Publishing. In the book, the author gives a narrative account of the life and "untimely" death of Albert "Ginger" Goodwin; a migrant coal miner from Treeton, England. In 1910, Goodwin arrived on Vancouver Island to work in the Cumberland mines. He became an active labour leader, organizing local unions for collective bargaining.

The book chronicles Goodwin's rise to prominent heights of leadership and labour advocacy, to become vice president of the British Columbia Federation of Labour and president of both the Trail Trades and Labour Council and the International Union of Mine, Mill, and Smelter Workers. When Goodwin reached the pinnacle of his career, his biography took an unanticipated turn; rapidly declining to the point of Goodwin's death – from a single bullet fired by a Constable of the Dominion Police. The controversy around Goodwin's death remains as of 2014, and Mayse provides a thorough account of the events in Ginger.

== Background ==
Susan Mayse, a Vancouver Island resident, had written in many formats prior to Goodwin's biography, including newspaper articles, radio plays, and novels. The book had its beginnings in a script for a radio play for CBC Ideas, written by Mayse in 1989, titled "The Shooting of Ginger Goodwin". In researching the book, she consulted newspapers, pamphlets, personal correspondence, journals, books, dissertations, papers, photographs and transcripts from the period. Personal interviews with residents of British Columbia also informed the book's content. Mayse has traced her roots to the mining towns of Yorkshire, very close to Goodwin's home town.

== Synopsis ==
Ginger focuses on Albert Goodwin's life from his arrival on Vancouver Island in late 1910, to his death on 27 July 1918, which is surrounded in controversy. When Goodwin began working the Cumberland mines, he found the working conditions appalling and convinced his local union to "down tools" in protest. These actions spread encouragement for others to join in civil disobedience and led to the coal mining strike of 1912. The strike failed to achieve the workers' goals but is measured as one of Canada's most expensive economic burdens. Goodwin was "blackballed" for his role and never found employment in mining operations again.

Goodwin went on to work in the local smelters union where he again organized labour, steadily gaining prominence. By 1917, he became vice-president of the British Columbia Federation of Labour, president of the International Union of Mine, Mill, and Smelter Workers (IUMMSW), and president of the Trail Trades and Labour Council. Using his influence, Goodwin rallied for the adoption of a standard eight-hour work day but would be shot dead by Constable Daniel Campbell of the Dominion Police before achieving this goal. Goodwin was killed in a wilderness area near Cumberland while on the run for draft evasion. As Mayse states in the book, "there is still controversy about the circumstances of the shooting." Goodwin's death ignited Canada's first general strike and he is still called a "martyr" as of 2014. The biography runs 212 pages, and includes a topical index, maps of locations involved, and black-and-white archival photographs.

== Reception ==
Canadian Materials noted Mayse's good organisation of content and extensive bibliography, but critiqued the lack of solid biographical details that would "justify a full-blown biography." The reviewer felt that the character sketch "is inadequate." The book was recommended as a good background for readers interested in World War I-era labour politics in Canada. Mark Leier of the Canadian Historical Review debated Mayse's interpretation of class struggles and early-twentieth-century Canadian politics, concluding that the writer "is at her best when reflecting on life in company towns." Leier challenged some of Mayse's conclusions regarding the forensic evidence in Goodwin's death. A Books in Canada reviewer wished more details of Goodwin's life were included, acknowledging that Mayse organises her available material effectively and "presents it in an engaging manner". BC Studies felt the book was "a well-written account, enhanced by the skilful use of both photographic and oral evidence," but criticized some of Mayse's tone and characterization, and pointed out that the author had excluded some scholarly literature on Goodwin.

== Awards and honours ==
Susan Mayse received the first Edna Staebler Award for Creative Non-Fiction ever awarded; in 1991, for Ginger. The book also earned Mayse the Arthur Ellis Award from the Crime Writers of Canada for "Best True Crime" for the same year.

== See also ==
- List of Edna Staebler Award recipients
