= Kevin Patterson (writer) =

Canadian medical doctor and writer (born 1964)

- Born: December 27, 1964 (age 61); Kapuskasing, Ontario, Canada
- Education: University of Manitoba
- Occupations: soldier, doctor, writer

Kevin Patterson (born December 27, 1964) is a Canadian medical doctor and writer. His short story collection, Country of Cold, won the Rogers Writers' Trust Fiction Prize in 2003. His latest book, Outside the Wire: The War in Afghanistan in the Words of its Participants, published in 2008, is a collection of first-hand accounts written by soldiers, doctors and aid workers on the front lines of Canada's war in Afghanistan.

== Early life ==
Kevin Patterson was born on December 27, 1964, in Kapuskasing, Ontario and raised in Selkirk, Manitoba. He put himself through medical school at the University of Manitoba in Winnipeg by enlisting in the Canadian army. When his service was up, he worked as a doctor in the Arctic and on the coast of British Columbia while pursuing his MFA in creative writing at the University of British Columbia.

== Writing career ==
In 1999, Patterson published The Water in Between, a travel memoir of his sailing expedition in the Pacific Ocean. The book was nominated for the 2000 Edna Staebler Award for Creative Non-Fiction. His first novel, Consumption, was published in September 2006 in Canada. He co-edited Outside the Wire: The War in Afghanistan in the Words of its Participants, which was released in January 2008.

=== Talk to Me Like My Father ===
Talk to Me Like My Father, Patterson's account of spending six weeks as a doctor with NATO forces in Afghanistan in the winter of 2007, was published in the July–August issue of Mother Jones magazine in the U.S. The article created news headlines in Canada because of Patterson's graphic description of the dying moments of Nova Scotia-born soldier Kevin Megeney.

Although Megeney's name had previously been published in Canadian media, the Canadian Department of National Defence initiated a military police investigation into Patterson's conduct to determine whether or not he breached doctor-patient confidentiality. He was later cleared when the DND received confirmation from Megeney's mother that she had consented to the publication of the article. However, in January 2009 he was officially censured by the B.C. College of Physicians and Surgeons and ordered to pay $5,000 in costs.

== Awards and honours ==
- 2003 Rogers Writers' Trust Fiction Prize (for Country of Cold)
- 2003 City of Victoria Butler Book Prize (for Country of Cold)

== Bibliography ==
=== Novels ===
- Consumption (2006) Vintage Canada
- News from the Red Desert (2016)

=== Short stories ===
- Country of Cold (2003) Anchor

=== Non-fiction ===
- The Water in Between: A Journey at Sea (1999) Vintage Canada
- co-editor, Outside the Wire: The War in Afghanistan in the Words of its Participants (2008) Vintage Canada
