= Lost: A Memoir =

- First edition cover of Canadian release
- Author: Cathy Ostlere
- Genre: non-fiction, memoir
- Publisher: Key Porter Books
- Publication date: May 30, 2008
- Publication place: Canada
- Media type: Print (hardback and paperback)
- Pages: 240 pp.
- ISBN: 9781554700431

Lost: A Memoir is a non-fiction memoir, written by Canadian writer Cathy Ostlere, first published in May 2008 by Key Porter Books. In the book, the author chronicles her feelings of guilt associated with her brother and his fiancée being declared "lost at sea". Ostlere had promised her brother not to divulge his plans for a sea voyage, and when his birthday in 1995 passed without the family receiving a call, she felt it was not particularly unusual of his character, and choose not to mention their secret. After weeks of no word, Ostlere admitted to her parents that she had knowledge of the seafaring plans. Soon after admitting this, it was determined that the couple were officially "lost at sea".

== Awards and honours ==
Lost received shortlist recognition for the 2009 Edna Staebler Award for creative non-fiction.

== See also ==
- List of Edna Staebler Award recipients
