= The Riverbones =

2008 non-fiction book by Andrew Westoll

The Riverbones: Stumbling After Eden in the Jungles of Suriname
- First edition cover of Canadian release
- Author: Andrew Westoll
- Subject: Civil strife
- Genre: Non-fiction, book
- Publisher: McClelland & Stewart
- Publication date: October 28, 2008
- Publication place: Canada
- Media type: Print (Hardcover & Paperback)
- Pages: 365 pp.
- ISBN: 9780771088759

The Riverbones: Stumbling After Eden in the Jungles of Suriname is a non-fiction book, written by Canadian writer Andrew Westoll, first published in October 2008 by McClelland & Stewart. In the book, the author chronicles civil strife in Suriname. Westoll describes the modern struggles for human rights, ecological preservation, and the economic needs of the Suriname people. The Riverbones is called "a spellbinding tale of survival, heartbreak, mystery and murder".

== Awards and honours ==
The Riverbones received shortlist recognition for the 2009 "Edna Staebler Award for Creative Non-Fiction".

== See also ==
- List of Edna Staebler Award recipients
