= Sharing a Robin's Life =

1993 non-fiction book by Linda Johns

- First edition cover of Canadian release
- Author: Linda Johns
- Genre: non-fiction, book
- Publisher: Nimbus Publishing
- Publication date: July 1, 1993
- Publication place: Canada
- Media type: Print (hardback and paperback)
- Pages: 164 pp.
- ISBN: 9781551090559

Sharing a Robin's Life is a non-fiction book, written by Canadian writer Linda Johns, first published in July 1993 by Nimbus Publishing. In the book, the author writes in first person prose; describing when she and a robin, she had nurtured from peril, cohabited; and shared their life and home. The judges who awarded Linda Johns the "Edna Staebler Award" called the book; "a remarkable" read, saying it "challenges our preconceptions" about the "natural world around us."

== Awards and honours ==
Sharing a Robin's Life received the 1994 "Edna Staebler Award for Creative Non-Fiction".

== See also ==
- List of Edna Staebler Award recipients
