= The Red Wall =

Non-fiction book by Canadian writer Jane Hall

The Red Wall: A Woman in the RCMP
- First edition cover of Canadian release
- Author: Jane Hall
- Subject: Women's rights
- Genre: Non-fiction, book
- Publisher: General Store Publishing
- Publication date: July 20, 2007
- Publication place: Canada
- Media type: Print (Paperback), eBook (EPUB, Kindle, PDF)
- Pages: 351 pp.
- ISBN: 9781897113684

The Red Wall: A Woman in the RCMP is a non-fiction book, written by Canadian writer Jane Hall, first published in July 2007 by General Store Publishing. In the book, the author chronicles her personal experiences as the first woman accepted in the Royal Canadian Mounted Police (RCMP).

Hall recalls that ever since becoming a Mountie in 1977, people have asked her "What it was like"? Hall says she always avoided answering the question because she knew the story couldn't be told with a few sentences. The book's 351 pages are apparently sufficient as the book has been well received for its historical significance. Hall says of her book, "It was time to break the silence; time to acknowledge our successes and our failures. Time to move forward." Hall spent eight years writing her manuscript, and another two years copy-editing her work before presenting it for publication.

== Awards and honours ==
The Red Wall received shortlist recognition for the 2008 "Edna Staebler Award for Creative Non-Fiction".

== See also ==
- List of Edna Staebler Award recipients
