= Edna Staebler =

Canadian cookbook writer

Edna Staebler CM
- Born: Cora Margaret Cress; January 15, 1906; Berlin, Ontario (now Kitchener, Ontario)
- Died: September 12, 2006 (aged 100); Waterloo, Ontario, Canada
- Occupations: writer, philanthropist
- Writing career
- Genres: Non-fiction, historical non-fiction, creative non-fiction essay, literary criticism, Mennonite cooking
- Notable works: Food That Really Schmecks cookbook series, Namesake for the Edna Staebler Award

Edna Staebler CM (January 15, 1906 – September 12, 2006) was a Canadian writer and literary journalist, best known for her series of cookbooks, particularly Food That Really Schmecks. While the book contains Mennonite recipes, the content also includes stories and anecdotes about life and home cooking in the rural areas of the Waterloo Region.

== Life ==
Edna Staebler was born in Berlin, Ontario (renamed Kitchener during World War I) in 1906 and grew up there.

Edna's birth certificate shows her name was originally registered as Cora Margaret Cress and later changed, (by annotation on birth certificate referencing a 1910 letter), to Edna Louisa Cress. She was the daughter of machinist, John Gerp Cress (7 April 1875 – 23 October 1932) and Louise Cress (née Sattler) (24 January 1881 – 8 March 1972) who were married 15 July 1903.

Staebler received a BA from the University of Toronto and a teacher's certificate from the Ontario College of Education. Staebler married in 1933, but divorced in 1962. Beginning in 1948, she wrote articles for Maclean's, Chatelaine, Saturday Night, Reader's Digest, Star Weekly and other newspapers and magazines; she has also written non-fiction with Canadian themes. In 1991, she established an award for creative non-fiction, awarded annually by Wilfrid Laurier University. Staebler was awarded membership to the Order of Canada in 1996.

She died of a stroke in Waterloo, Ontario, in 2006 at the age of 100.

A biography, To Experience Wonder, Edna Staebler: A Life (2003), was written by Veronica Ross; a collection of her diaries, Must Write, edited by Christl Verduyn, was published in 2005.

== Other books by Edna Staebler ==
In addition to Food that Really Schmecks, Stabler is also the author (or editor) of the following:

- Sauerkraut and Enterprise. University Women's Club of Kitchener-Waterloo, 1967; Toronto: McClelland and Stewart, 1969.
- Cape Breton Harbour. Toronto: McClelland and Stewart, 1972; Toronto: McGraw-Hill Ryerson, 1990.
- More Food That Really Schmecks. Toronto: McClelland and Stewart, 1979.
- Haven't Any News: Ruby's Letters from the '50s. Edited by Edna Staebler. Waterloo: Wilfrid Laurier University Press, 1995.
- Whatever Happened to Maggie and Other People I've Known. Toronto: McClelland and Stewart, 1983.
- Schmecks Appeal. More Mennonite Cooking. Toronto: McClelland and Stewart, 1987.

== Awards received by Edna Staebler ==
In addition to the Order of Canada, Staebler also received the following awards:

- Canadian Women's Press Club Award for Outstanding Literary Journalism (1950)
- Kitchener-Waterloo Woman of the Year (1980)
- Honorary Doctor of Letters degree from Wilfrid Laurier University (1984)
- Waterloo-Wellington Hospitality Award (1988)
- Province of Ontario Senior Achievement Award (1989)
- Kitchener-Waterloo Arts Award (1989)
- Silver Ladle Award for Outstanding Contribution to the Culinary Arts (1991)
- Governor General's Commemorative Medal (1993)
- Regional Municipality of Waterloo Volunteer Award (1994)
- Inducted into Waterloo Region Hall of Fame (1998)

== See also ==
- Edna Staebler Award
