= Into the Blue (book) =

2003 book by Andrea Curtis

Into the Blue: Family Secrets and the Search for a Great Lakes Shipwreck
- First edition cover of Canadian release
- Author: Andrea Curtis
- Subject: Shipwreck of SS J.H. Jones
- Genre: non-fiction, book
- Publisher: Random House Canada
- Publication date: April 22, 2003
- Publication place: Canada
- Media type: Print (hardback and paperback)
- Pages: 288
- ISBN: 9780679311355

Into the Blue: Family Secrets and the Search for a Great Lakes Shipwreck is a non-fiction book, written by Canadian writer Andrea Curtis, first published in April 2003 by Random House Canada. In the book, the author narrates her family history and their connection to the 1906 shipwreck of the SS J.H. Jones, lost to the late-November swells of Ontario's Georgian Bay, claiming the lives of all on board. The ship's captain, Jim Crawford, left his one-year-old daughter, Eleanor, an orphan who faced a future of poverty. Curtis did not know the stigma her grandmother endured until researching the shipwreck, and discovering its links to her families past. Staebler Award administrator Kathryn Wardropper called the book "a thoroughly credible and enjoyable book".

== Awards and honours ==
Into the Blue received the 2004 Edna Staebler Award for Creative Non-Fiction.

== See also ==
- List of Edna Staebler Award recipients
