= The Guns of Normandy =

1995 non-fiction book by George G. Blackburn

The Guns of Normandy: A Soldier's Eye View, France 1944
- First edition cover of Canadian release
- Author: George G. Blackburn
- Subject: World War II
- Genre: Non-fiction book
- Publisher: McClelland & Stewart
- Publication date: October 28, 1995
- Publication place: Canada
- Media type: Print (Hardcover & Paperback)
- Pages: 536 pp.
- ISBN: 9780771015038

The Guns of Normandy: A Soldier's Eye View, France 1944 is a non-fiction book, written by Canadian writer George G. Blackburn, first published in October 1995 by McClelland & Stewart. In the book, the author renders a firsthand account of the Normandy invasion from within the Canadian Forces. The narrative account was called "gripping", given in "the most graphic and authentic detail". The panel of judges who awarded the "Edna Staebler Award for Creative Non-Fiction" called The Guns of Normandy "an outstanding example" of the genre.

== Awards and honours ==
The Guns of Normandy won the 1996 Ottawa Citizen "Book of the Year Award" and received shortlist honours for the '96 "Trillium Award". The book won Blackburn the 1996 "Edna Staebler Award for Creative Non-Fiction" as well, giving him acclaim at the national level.

== See also ==
- List of Edna Staebler Award recipients
