= Letters from the Lost =

Non-fiction memoir by Helen Waldstein Wilkes

Letters from the Lost: A Memoir of Discovery
- First edition cover of Canadian release
- Author: 'Helen Waldstein Wilkes'
- Subject: The new message of old letters
- Genre: non-fiction, memoir
- Publisher: Athabasca University Press
- Publication date: December 15, 2009
- Publication place: Canada
- Media type: Print (hardback and paperback)
- Pages: 280 pp.
- ISBN: 9781897425534

Letters from the Lost: A Memoir of Discovery is a non-fiction memoir, written by Canadian writer Helen Waldstein Wilkes, first published in December 2009 by Athabasca University Press. In the book, the author chronicles her discoveries after reading a box of letters she had never before seen. Her Jewish parents had fled Czechoslovakia in April 1939 to seek haven in Canada. Once in place, they corresponded with family and friends, encouraging them to escape the mounting peril that Hitler had envisioned as the Final Solution. Wilkes would learn that shortly after her parents migration, the ability to flee had been curtailed; and that each letter, compounded the historical anguish the writers were forced to endure.

== Awards and honours ==
Letters from the Lost received the "Alberta Readers' Choice Award" in 2011, for "the best fiction or narrative non-fiction book written by an Alberta author." The book also received the 2011 "Edna Staebler Award for Creative Non-Fiction".

== See also ==
- List of Edna Staebler Award recipients

== Translations ==
- "Das Schlimmste aber war der Judenstern." Das Schicksal meiner Familie. Transl. Christina Goldt, Ingrid Hildebrand, Margarete Kollmar, Angelika Meirhofer, Ilse Windhoff. Osburg, Hamburg 2014 (German)
- Spanish: “Cartas de los Ausentes“. Transl. José Miguel Parra, Prologue Jacobo Pruschy. Editorial Confluencias. Spain 2018.
