= After (Chalifour book) =

2005 non-fiction book by Francis Chalifour

- First edition cover of Canadian release
- Author: Francis Chalifour
- Subject: Suicide
- Genre: Non-fiction
- Publisher: Tundra Books
- Publication date: October 11, 2005
- Publication place: Canada
- Media type: Print (Hardcover & Paperback)
- Pages: 256 pp.
- ISBN: 9780887767050

After is a non-fiction book written by Canadian writer Francis Chalifour, first published in October 2005 by Tundra Books. In the book, the author narrates his pain and confusion as he grieved his father's death by suicide. Judith Miller, an award judge for the Edna Staebler Award called After, "deeply moving" saying, "We enjoyed the lyricism of his language and his strong sense of character."

== Awards and honours ==
After received the 2006 "Edna Staebler Award for Creative Non-Fiction". The book was also nominated for a Governor General's Literary Award in 2005.

== See also ==
- List of Edna Staebler Award recipients
