= Francis Chalifour =

Canadian writer

Francis Chalofour
- Born: April 13, 1977 (age 48)
- Occupation: Author
- Genre: Children's Literature

Francis Chalifour (born April 13, 1977) is a contemporary Canadian writer.

== Writing ==
His first published work was the French novel Zoom Papaye, and his second, After, won the 2005 Edna Staebler Award for Creative Non-Fiction and was nominated for the Governor General's Award 2005. He wrote the book called Le fils du pendu.

He has also contributed articles to Maclean's, the Toronto Star, The Walrus, Le Devoir and La Presse. He has hosted the radio program Ondes De Choc, and worked for the TV show Volt.

== See also ==
- List of Edna Staebler Award recipients
