= Stardust (Serafin book) =

- First edition cover of Canadian release
- Author: 'Bruce Serafin'
- Genre: Non-fiction, memoir
- Publisher: New Star Books
- Publication date: October 30, 2007
- Publication place: Canada
- Media type: Print (hardback and paperback)
- Pages: 240 pp.
- ISBN: 9781554200337

Stardust is a non-fiction collection of memoirs and essays, written by Canadian writer Bruce Serafin, first published in October 2007 by New Star Books. The book, contains 20 writings from Serafin's youth; compiled after the authors death in 2007. Primarily the prose dishes harsh criticism at the establishment; in the authors style of candid and frank discourse. Serafin was honored posthumously for his work.

== Awards and honours ==
Stardust received the 2008 "Edna Staebler Award for Creative Non-Fiction".

== See also ==
- List of Edna Staebler Award recipients
