= The Last Island =

2002 memoir by Alison Watt

The Last Island: A Naturalist's Sojourn on Triangle Island
- First edition cover of Canadian release
- Author: Alison Watt
- Subject: Bird watching
- Genre: Non-fiction, memoir
- Publisher: Harbour Publishing
- Publication date: September 1, 2002
- Publication place: Canada
- Media type: Print (Hardcover & Paperback)
- Pages: 256 pp.
- ISBN: 9781553656326

The Last Island: A Naturalist's Sojourn on Triangle Island is a non-fiction memoir, written by Canadian writer Alison Watt, first published in September 2002 by Harbour Publishing. In the book, the author chronicles her return to Triangle Island, a bird sanctuary off the northern tip of Vancouver Island. Watt spent four months studying tufted puffins with her mentor Anne Vallee, returning 16 years later after Vallee's death. The Last Island is written in "beautiful language combined with watercolour paintings" with the power to "transport the reader to the island".

== Awards and honours ==
The Last Island received the "Stephen Leacock Memorial Medal for Humour" in June 2012, for "the best in Canadian humour writing". The book also received the 2003 "Edna Staebler Award for Creative Non-Fiction".

== See also ==
- List of Edna Staebler Award recipients
