= Into the Abyss (book) =

2012 book by 'Carol Shaben'

Into the Abyss: How a Deadly Plane Crash Changed the Lives of a Pilot, a Politician, a Criminal and a Cop
- First edition cover of Canadian release
- Author: 'Carol Shaben'
- Subject: Near-death experience
- Genre: non-fiction, book
- Publisher: Random House
- Publication date: September 1, 2012
- Publication place: Canada
- Media type: Print (hardback and paperback)
- Pages: 336 pp.
- ISBN: 9780307360229

Into the Abyss: How a Deadly Plane Crash Changed the Lives of a Pilot, a Politician, a Criminal and a Cop is a non-fiction book, written by the Canadian writer Carol Shaben, first published in September 2012 by Random House. The book's narrative chronicles the doomed flight of a Piper Navajo commuter plane, Wapiti Aviation Flight 402, and the plight of four survivors as they endured the remote wilderness of northern Alberta where the plane had crashed.

== Awards and honours ==
Into the Abyss received the 2013 "Edna Staebler Award for Creative Non-Fiction".

== See also ==
- List of Edna Staebler Award recipients
- Larry Shaben
- Grant Notley
