= Alison Watt =

Alison Watt may refer to:

- Alison Watt (British painter) (born 1965)
- Alison Watt (writer) (born 1957), Canadian, writer, and painter
