= Mrs. King =

1997 non-fiction book by Charlotte Gray

Mrs. King: The Life and Times of Isabel Mackenzie King
- First edition cover of Canadian release
- Author: Charlotte Gray
- Subject: Biography
- Genre: Non-fiction, book
- Publisher: Penguin Books
- Publication date: 1997
- Publication place: Canada
- Media type: Print (Hardcover & Paperback)
- Pages: 378 pp.
- ISBN: 9780670866748

Mrs. King: The Life and Times of Isabel Mackenzie King is a non-fiction book, written by Canadian writer Charlotte Gray, first published in 1997 by Penguin Books. In the book, the author chronicles the life of William Lyon Mackenzie's daughter; the mother of Canada's longest-serving prime minister, William Lyon Mackenzie King. Her son portrayed her as the "ideal woman, the epitome of motherhood and an angel of goodness and light." His biographers have portrayed her as "an ambitious, grasping manipulator who pushed her eldest son into politics and then contrived to keep him a bachelor so that he could support the rest of his family." Wilfrid Laurier University's Faculty of Arts panel called Mrs. King an "outstanding example of creative non-fiction", further stating, "Charlotte Gray has written a biography with the narrative power of a fine novel."

== Awards and honours ==
Mrs. King won the "Edna Staebler Award for Creative Non-Fiction", and the Canadian Authors Association's "Birks Foundation Award for Non-fiction". The book was also nominated for the "Viacom Award" and a "Governor-General's Award".

== See also ==
- List of Edna Staebler Award recipients
