= George G. Blackburn =

Canadian veteran, playwright, and author (1917–2006)

George Blackburn, CM, MC
- Born: George Gideon Blackburn; February 3, 1917; Wales, Ontario
- Died: November 15, 2006 (aged 89); Ottawa
- Occupations: World War II war veteran, playwright, writer
- Spouse: Grace Fortington (m. 1942–2002)
- Writing career
- Genres: Non-fiction, historical non-fiction, creative non-fiction essay, literary criticism
- Notable works: The Guns of Normandy; The Guns of Victory; Where the Hell are the Guns?

George Gideon Blackburn, CM MC (February 3, 1917 – November 15, 2006) was a decorated Canadian veteran of World War II (Military Cross; French Legion of Honour), a playwright and author. Born in Wales, Ontario, Blackburn worked as a newspaper reporter for the Ottawa Journal in Pembroke, Ontario.

== Military service ==
George Blackburn joined the Canadian Army in 1940, becoming a forward observation officer. He fought in the Battle of Normandy. Blackburn was awarded his Military Cross in 1945 for his role in defending the Twente Canal bridgehead in the Netherlands.

Blackburn returned to Ottawa after the war and found work as a journalist and with the Canadian Department of Labour as Director of Information as well as Director of Fair Employment Practices. He wrote a musical jingle, well known in Canada during the 1960s, Why Wait for Spring? Do It Now, that encouraged home owners to have home improvements done during winter. He was producer for a radio show, Canada at Work and also wrote a musical play, A Day to Remember, about the opening of the Saint Lawrence Seaway, an event that permanently submerged his home town.

== Writing career ==
Blackburn wrote a trilogy of books based on his war-time experiences: The Guns of Normandy: A Soldier's Eye View, France 1944 The Guns of Victory: A Soldier's Eye View, Belgium, Holland, and Germany, 1944-45, and Where the Hell Are the Guns?: A Soldier's View of the Anxious Years, 1939–44. The Guns of Normandy received the "Edna Staebler Award for Creative Non-Fiction" in 1996. He was appointed to the Order of Canada in 2001. He also received the French Legion of Honour in 2004 Légion d'honneur.

Blackburn died at the Ottawa General Hospital in 2006 where he was being treated for cancer.
