= I'll Tell You a Secret =

2004 memoir by Anne Coleman

I'll Tell You a Secret: a Memory of Seven Summers
- First edition cover of Canadian release
- Author: Anne Coleman
- Subject: Hugh MacLennan
- Genre: non-fiction, memoir
- Publisher: McClelland & Stewart
- Publication date: September 7, 2004
- Publication place: Canada
- Media type: Print (hardback and paperback)
- Pages: 248 pp.
- ISBN: 9780771022784

I'll Tell You a Secret: a Memory of Seven Summers is a non-fiction memoir, written by Canadian writer Anne Coleman, first published in September 2004 by McClelland & Stewart. In the book, the author offers her perspective of Hugh MacLennan, her mentor and well known Canadian literary figure. The voice is described as "uncompromising, perceptive and rich with reflection." Kathryn Wardropper, administrator of the Edna Staebler Award said, "The judges were thrilled with her writing and Edna, herself, was a strong champion of this title."

== Awards and honours ==
I'll Tell You a Secret received the 2005 "Edna Staebler Award for Creative Non-Fiction".

== See also ==
- List of Edna Staebler Award recipients
