= Charlotte Gray (author) =

Canadian historian and author (born 1948)

- Born: January 3, 1948 (age 78); Sheffield, England
- Education: Oxford University; London School of Economics
- Occupations: Historian, author

Charlotte Gray, CM (born January 3, 1948) is a British-born Canadian historian and author. The Winnipeg Free Press has called her "one of Canada's best loved writers of popular history and literary biography."

== Early life and education ==
Born in Sheffield, England, and educated at Oxford University and the London School of Economics, Gray came to Canada in 1979.

== Career ==
She worked for a number of years as a journalist, writing a regular column on national politics for Saturday Night and appearing regularly on radio and television discussion panels. She has also written for Chatelaine, The Globe and Mail, the National Post and the Ottawa Citizen.

Gray is an adjunct research professor in the department of History at Carleton University, and holds honorary degrees from Mount Saint Vincent University in Halifax, the University of Ottawa and Queen's University. She was awarded the UBC Medal for Canadian Biography in 2002 and the Pierre Berton Prize for distinguished achievement in popularizing and promoting Canadian history in 2003. She has won or been nominated for most of the major non-fiction awards in Canada. In 2004 she served on the jury for the prestigious Scotiabank Giller Prize. In 2007, she was made a Member of the Order of Canada.

In 2004, Gray appeared on the CBC Television series The Greatest Canadian advocating for Sir John A. Macdonald, Canada's first Prime Minister.

== Personal life ==
Gray lives in New Edinburgh, a neighbourhood in Ottawa. She is married to George Anderson, the president of an organization called the Forum of Federations, and former Deputy Minister of Natural Resources Canada and before that of Intergovernmental Affairs. They have three sons.

== Awards and honours ==
In 2016, the Literary Review of Canada listed Sisters in the Wilderness among the top 25 most influential Canadian books in the past 25 years.

The Globe and Mail included Murdered Midas on their "The Globe 100: Books that shaped 2019" list.

Awards for Gray's writing
Year	Title	Award	Result	Ref.
1997	Mrs. King	Hilary Weston Writers' Trust Prize for Nonfiction	Winner	
1998	Mrs. King	Edna Staebler Award for Creative Non-Fiction	Winner	
2006	Reluctant Genius	Hilary Weston Writers' Trust Prize for Nonfiction	Shortlist	
2014	The Massey Murder	RBC Taylor Prize for Literary Nonfiction	Shortlist	
2014	The Massey Murder	Toronto Book Awards	Winner	

== Publications ==
- Mrs. King: The Life and Times of Isabel Mackenzie King. 1997
- Sisters in the Wilderness: The Lives of Susanna Moodie and Catharine Parr Traill. 1999
- Flint & Feather: The Life and Times of E. Pauline Johnson, Tekahionwake. 2002
- Canada, A Portrait in Letters. 2003
- The Museum Called Canada. 2004
- Reluctant Genius: The Passionate Life and Inventive Mind of Alexander Graham Bell 2006
- Extraordinary Canadians: Nellie McClung 2008
- Gold Diggers: Striking it Rich in the Klondike 2010
- The Massey Murder: A Maid, Her Master and the Trial that Shocked a Country 2013
- The Promise of Canada 2016
- Murdered Midas: A Millionaire, His Gold Mine, and a Strange Death on an Island Paradise, HarperCollins, 2019 (Covers the life and death of Sir Harry Oakes)
- Passionate Mothers, Powerful Sons: The Lives of Jennie Jerome Churchill and Sara Delano Roosevelt Simon and Schuster, 2023
