= Hayashi Studio =

Hayashi Studio (1911–1942) was a film photography studio run by Japanese-Canadian photographers in Cumberland, British Columbia. The studio was closed shortly before the internment of Japanese-Canadians, as part of a broader climate of racism and xenophobia at the time.

== Beginnings (1911–1919) ==
Hayashi studio was founded by Senjiro Hayashi (1800-1935), who immigrated to Canada in 1903. At the time, British Columbia was a hub of mining activity, with a large population of Asian-Canadian mine workers having been established in the 1890s. Hayashi apprenticed with accomplished photographer Shuzo Fujiwara in Vancouver.

Senjiro Hayashi founded Hayashi Studio in Cumberland, opening to the public for business in 1912. The studio provided photographic services both on and off-site, primarily serving Japanese-Canadians living in the Cumberland region. Many of the photographs archived from Hayashi Studio show aspects of integration of into daily Canadian life. There are notable examples of the studio photographing white visitors to the Japanese community as well. Later study of the Hayashi Studio archive has revealed that Senjiro and his successors likely used a Century Studio camera with a Royal 3.8 lens.

This period was also marked by more experimentation with social documentary. Senjiro Hayashi captured the funeral of Ginger Goodwin, a prominent labour activist, in 1918. Modern curators have noted that the photographs challenge traditional preconceptions of Asian immigrants to Canada in this period. Writing in 2000, OCAD University Professor Rosemary Donegan noted that Hayashi was an intimate observer in his subjects' lives, noting his balance between staged studio practice and mobile documentary work.

== Changing leadership (1919–1942) ==
Following Mr. Hayashi's retirement in 1919, a new photographer recorded only as 'Mr. Kitamura' began running the studio.

Four years later, in 1923, Senjiro Hayashi's former apprentice Tokitaro Matsubushi took over operations. For unclear reasons, the studio closed temporarily in the 1930s. The business was largely revived by an early World War II order for identification cards of Japanese-Canadians from the government.

Hayashi studio permanently ceased operations in 1942, amid rising discrimination and eventual internment of Japanese Canadians. For many patrons and likely employees of Hayashi studio, forced relocation involved a confiscation of property, preventing a re-opening of the studio.

The archives of Hayashi Studio are currently owned by the Cumberland Museum and Archives. Hayashi Studio was the subject of a 2018 documentary.
