= Timely Death =

1996 book by Anne Mullens

Timely Death: Considering Our Last Rights
- First edition cover of Canadian release
- Author: Anne Mullens
- Subject: Euthanasia
- Genre: non-fiction, book
- Publisher: Knopf Canada
- Publication date: May 7, 1996
- Publication place: Canada
- Media type: Print (hardback and paperback)
- Pages: 372 pp.
- ISBN: 9780394280844

Timely Death: Considering Our Last Rights is a non-fiction book, written by Canadian writer Anne Mullens, first published in May 1996 by Knopf Canada. In the book, the author chronicles medical advances and increased longevity in the context of the right to a dignified death. The book has been called a "well-researched and comprehensive book, written with compassion and clarity." Anne Mullens, covered the Sue Rodriguez story as a journalist for The Vancouver Sun and later for the Toronto Star. This was Mullens's inspiration for writing the book and she said "her attitude towards death changed during the course of writing it".

== Awards and honours ==
Timely Death received the 1997 "Edna Staebler Award for Creative Non-Fiction".

== See also ==
- List of Edna Staebler Award recipients
