= Baptism of Fire: The Second Battle of Ypres and the Forging of Canada, April 1915 =

- First edition cover of Canadian release
- Author: 'Nathan M. Greenfield'
- Genre: non-fiction, book
- Publisher: HarperCollins
- Publication date: April 10, 2007
- Publication place: Canada
- Media type: Print (hardback and paperback)
- Pages: 400 pp.
- ISBN: 9780002007276

Baptism of Fire: The Second Battle of Ypres and the Forging of Canada, April 1915 is a non-fiction book, written by Canadian writer Nathan M. Greenfield, first published in April 2007 by HarperCollins. In the book, the author recounts "The Second Battle of Ypres", called an "heroic battle" of World War I. The battle poised skilled German soldiers armed with chlorine gas against the entrenched 1st Canadian Division who managed to prevail, against odds. In defeating the Germans, and overcoming the effects of the first chemical attack of the modern era, Greenfield tells a "gripping" tale for anyone seeking to understand Canadian history or her military past.

== Awards and honours ==
Baptism of Fire received shortlist recognition for the 2008 "Edna Staebler Award for Creative Non-Fiction".

== See also ==
- List of Edna Staebler Award recipients
