= Robyn Michele Levy =

Canadian artist and comic writer

- Born: March 29, 1964 (age 62); Toronto, Ontario, Canada
- Occupation: writer
- Known for: comic autobiography
- Spouse: Bergen
- Children: a daughter
- Website: robynlevygallery

Robyn Michele Levy (born March 29, 1964) is a Canadian artist and comic writer. In 2012, her book Most of Me was a shortlisted finalist for the Stephen Leacock Memorial Medal for Humour and the Edna Staebler Award.

== Life ==
Levy was born in Toronto, Ontario in 1964.

In 2008, after losing her job as a result of depression sparked by undiagnosed medical symptoms, she received a diagnosis of Parkinson's disease which was soon confirmed by a second opinion and the growing list of symptoms. She had difficulty preparing food, walking and typing as one hand went dead and her body became rigid. She offset the depression reading obituaries and drafting one for herself. Her father had just had the diagnosis and she was reminded that other diseases had happened in her family. Within eight months of being told she had Parkinson's her doctors also confirmed that the lumps in her breast indicated that she had breast cancer. The rapid removal of her breast and her ovaries followed as her body was scanned for secondary sites of the cancer.

She was living in Vancouver, British Columbia. Levy turned to humour as a consolation for her problems. She created an alter-ego called "Cry Lady" and designed humorous business cards.

In 2011, she published an autobiography titled Most of Me. In 2012, the book was shortlisted for the Stephen Leacock Memorial Medal for Humour and the $10,000 Edna Staebler Award.
