= Albert Goodwin =

Canadian labor rights activist (1887–1918)

Albert "Ginger" Goodwin
- Born: Albert Goodwin; May 10, 1886; Treeton, Yorkshire, England
- Died: July 27, 1918 (aged 31) "Mount Ginger Goodwin" west of Cumberland, British Columbia, Canada
- Cause of death: Single gunshot/head trauma
- Resting place: Cumberland cemetery 49.637485°N 125.006775°W
- Monuments: Memorial headstone
- Other name: Ginger Goodwin
- Citizenship: British-Canadian dual national
- Occupations: Coal miner, labour activist
- Years active: 16
- Known for: Advocacy of workers' rights, his controversial death, martyrdom
- Political party: Socialist Party of Canada (SPC)
- Movement: Labour
- Criminal charge: Evading conscription into the Canadian Army
- Criminal penalty: State-ordered apprehension
- Criminal status: Killed during apprehension

Albert "Ginger" Goodwin (May 10, 1887 – July 27, 1918), nicknamed Ginger for his bright red hair, was a migrant coal miner who advocated for workers' rights and promoted the cause of unions in British Columbia, Canada. Angered by the working conditions in coal mines, Goodwin sought to increase wages and improve working conditions, and fought companies that disregarded workers' rights. He participated in and led multiple strikes, and served as a delegate for the British Columbia Federation of Labour and as an organizer for the Socialist Party of Canada. In the years following his increased activism and involvement with labour unions, Goodwin fell under scrutiny for his opposition to military conscription during World War I. He was killed by a police officer in 1918. There is debate on whether Goodwin was a victim of murder or if his death was the result of the officer's self-defence. His death sparked a one-day general strike in Vancouver on August 2, 1918, which was the first general strike ever held in Canada. The strike was a precursor of the Winnipeg general strike of 1919 and other labour conflicts.

== Early life and radicalization ==
Goodwin was born in Treeton, Yorkshire, England on May 10, 1887. In 1906 at age 19, he emigrated to Canada to work as a coal miner in Glace Bay, Nova Scotia. In 1911, he relocated to Vancouver Island, where he worked for the Canadian Collieries mining company in Cumberland, British Columbia.

While in Cumberland, Goodwin's participation in labour activism began, joining the Socialist Party of Canada and becoming an active member of the Cumberland Local 2299 union. During the 1912–1914 Coal Miners' Strike against Canadian Collieries, Goodwin became a key activist, speaking out against working conditions and advocating for mine safety and union recognition. While the workers did not win, the strike nevertheless had a major political and economic impact on the country, leading to recognition of the strikers' demands. Following the strike, Goodwin emerged as a dedicated socialist and union activist. However, as a result of his involvement in the strike, he found himself blacklisted from his workplace and was forced to leave Cumberland.

== Labour activism ==
In 1916, Goodwin moved to Trail, British Columbia, where he worked in the smelter for the Consolidated Mining and Smelting Company of Canada Limited. That same year, he joined the Mining and Smelter Workers' Union where he was elected as Secretary for the Trail chapter. Following his union involvement, Goodwin entered politics, running as a candidate for the Socialist Party of Canada in the 1916 provincial election representing Trail. Although he did not win, Goodwin carried on with his union activity. The following year, he was elected to the executive of the British Columbia Federation of Labour as Vice-President, and as the President of District 6 (Kootenays) of the International Union of Mine, Mill and Smelter Workers.

Goodwin frequently spoke out against Canada's involvement in World War I as a conscientious objector. He rejected conscription on the grounds that workers of one country should not be employed to kill workers of another country as a result of capitalist conflict. Goodwin is reputed to have said, "War is simply part of the process of Capitalism. Big financial interests are playing the game. They'll reap the victory, no matter how the war ends."

Goodwin eventually did sign up, but was initially exempted from conscription after a medical examination found him unfit for service. Following the exemption, Goodwin called a strike on November 10, 1917, at the Trail smelter in an attempt to get the company to agree to an eight-hour work day. As the strike continued, Goodwin was recalled for another medical examination, whereupon he was ordered to report for duty for overseas, overturning the decision previously made.

== Death ==
After being reinstated for conscription, Goodwin attempted to appeal the assignment, but was denied multiple times. He returned to Cumberland once more to prepare a final appeal. After returning to Vancouver Island, Goodwin and other draft evaders fled to the Cumberland hills sometime in April or May 1918, hiding out in the mountains around Comox Lake. By breaking into a cabin, they were able to survive with supplies provided by friends and community members.

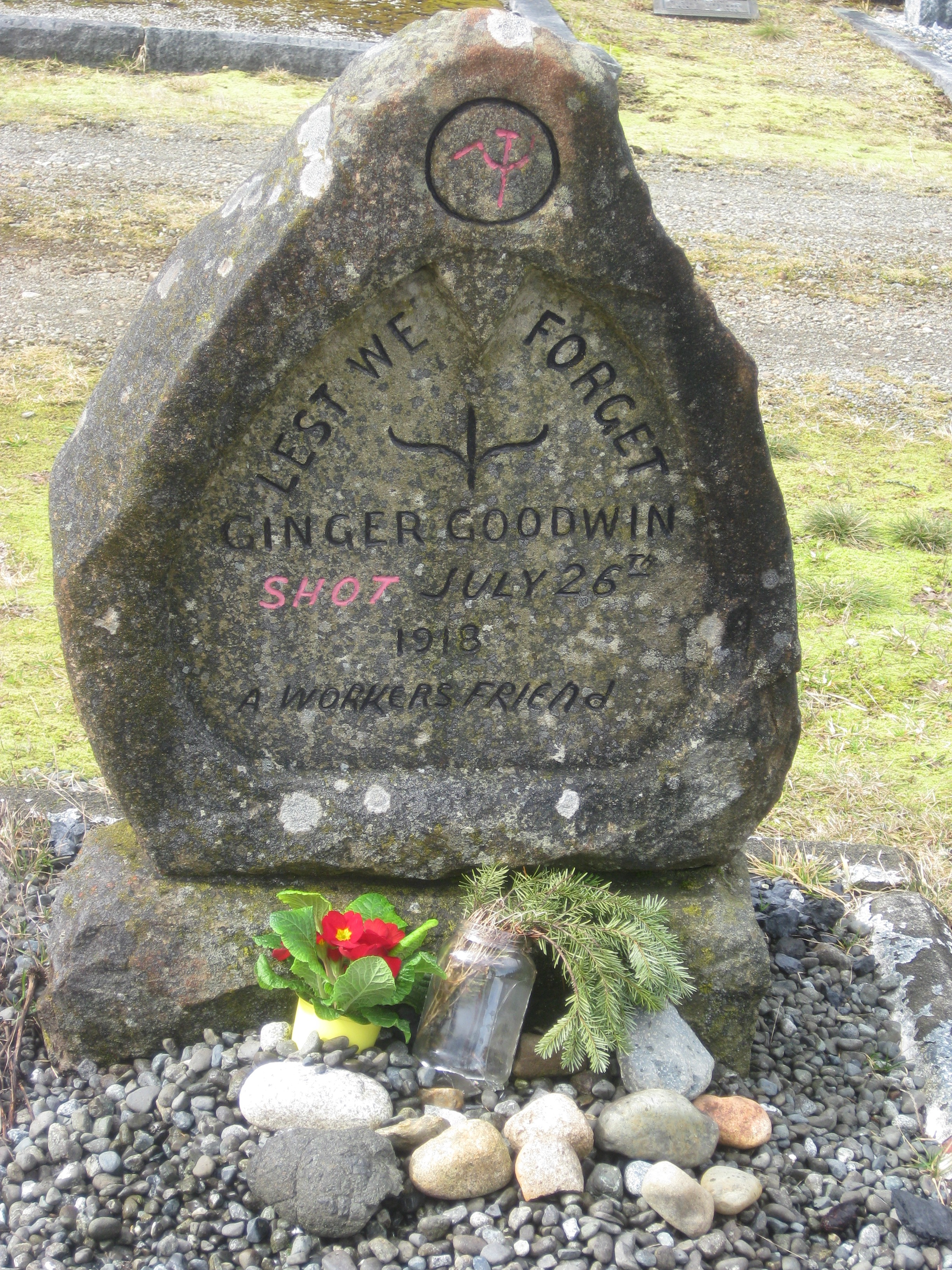
Headstone of Ginger Goodwin at the Cumberland Municipal Cemetery in Cumberland, British Columbia. Flowers have been left on the grave. Note that the date inscribed on the headstone is inaccurate.

On July 27, 1918, Dominion Police ventured into the hills to locate and arrest the men. On that day, Dominion Police Officer Dan Campbell encountered Goodwin in the woods at Comox Lake and shot him with a .30-30-calibre lever-action hunting rifle. Campbell claimed that the shot was fired in self-defence after Goodwin raised his own rifle when he was asked to surrender.

It remains unknown how the two men actually encountered each other since there were no other witnesses. There is debate on whether Campbell fired in self-defence or if he shot Goodwin deliberately, acting under special military orders. Goodwin died instantly after being shot in the neck, with the bullet severing his spinal cord on impact.

Local undertakers refused a police request to bury Goodwin on the spot where he was shot, and also refused to retrieve his body for authorities. His body was retrieved by friends and brought to Cumberland, where it was taken through the streets in a mile-long procession. Goodwin was interred at the Cumberland Municipal Cemetery, with thousands attending his funeral on August 2, 1918.

Campbell was charged with manslaughter following Goodwin's death. A grand jury in Victoria, British Columbia dismissed the charges against the policeman, who continued to claim that he had fired in self-defence. Despite the jury's decision, police officers and two justices of the peace believed there was enough evidence to warrant a further proceeding.

There are conflicting opinions on the actual date of Goodwin's death. While many sources date the death on July 27, others including his headstone state he died on July 26, 1918.

== Legacy ==
Goodwin's death outraged the BC labour movement. In protest, the Vancouver General Strike was held on August 2, 1918, the first of its kind in Canada. The Metal and Trades Council was the first to call for the 24-hour work stoppage, with the Vancouver Trades and Labour Council and other manual labourers following its lead.

At Comox Lake, Goodwin was commemorated by the naming of Ginger Goodwin Creek in 1982, and Mount Ginger Goodwin in 1989. A section of the Vancouver Island Highway 19 that passes through Cumberland was named Ginger Goodwin Way in 1996. Although the signs were removed by the province's Liberal government in 2001, the NDP government reinstalled them in 2018.

On July 27, 2018, the BC government proclaimed Ginger Goodwin Day to acknowledge his work as a champion of labour rights. The centennial day of his death was also marked by widespread recognition of his achievement.

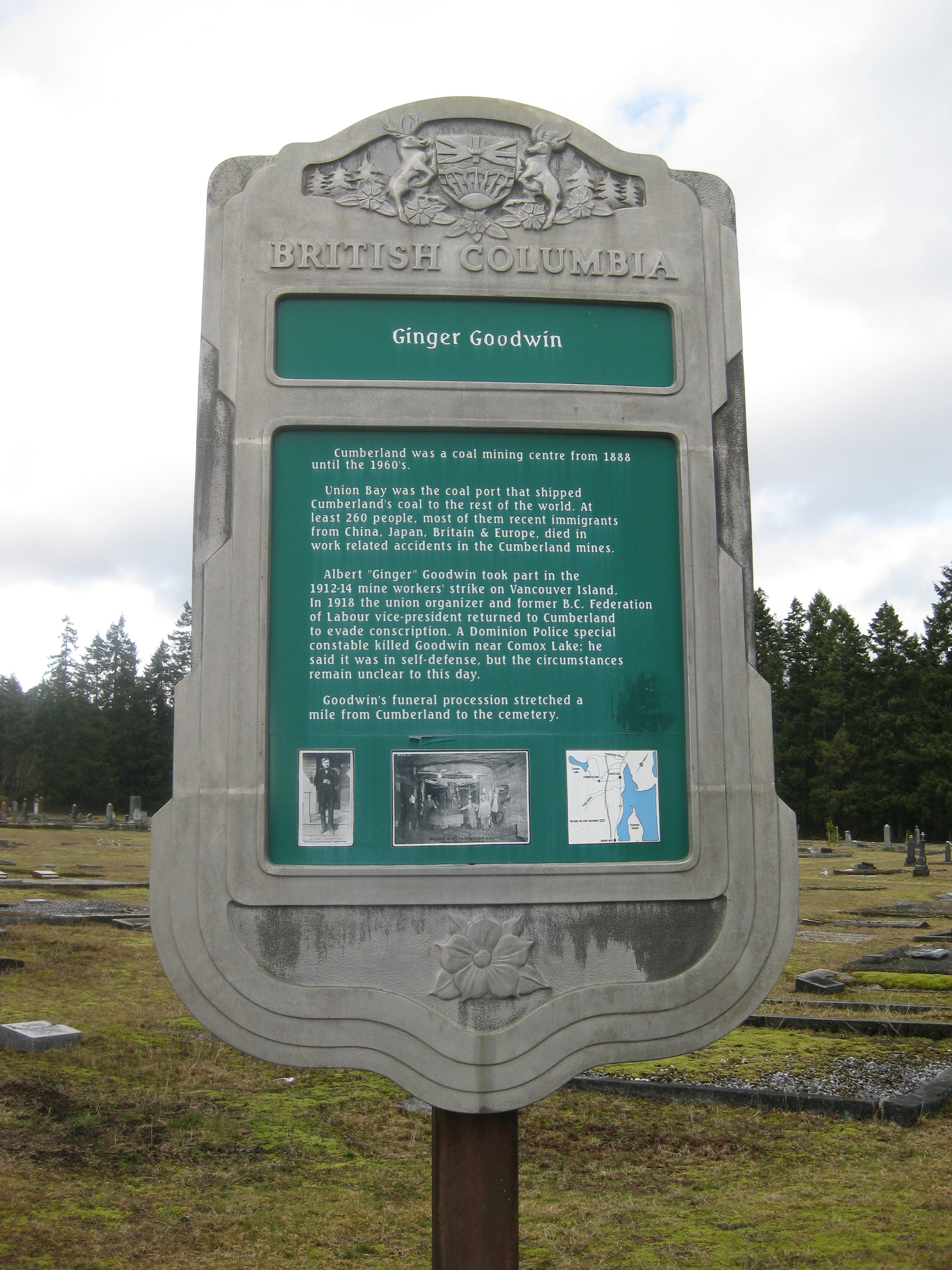
Sign outside the Cumberland Municipal Cemetery erected by the Province of British Columbia offering a brief description of Goodwin's life and work.

Goodwin's legacy was revived in Cumberland with Miners' Memorial Day in 1986. Organized by the Cumberland Museum and Archives, the annual event celebrates Cumberland's miners, including the 295 miners who died in accidents over the decades. A vigil is held every year during Miners' Memorial weekend, with people placing flowers on Goodwin's grave.

In 2016, the film, Goodwin's Way, directed by Comox Valley native and Capilano University Documentary Film Program Alumnus Neil Vokey, debuted. The film was initially developed at Capilano University under Canadian filmmakers and mentors Jack Silberman and Michelle Mason, and documents the town of Cumberland resisting the opening of a new mine and resurrecting the legacy of Ginger Goodwin. Residents share their viewpoints on the life story of the labour hero.

== Quotes ==
"...we know that all this misery is the outcome of someone's carelessness and that someone is the capitalists, those who own the machinery of production... This class of parasites have been living on the blood of the working class, they are responsible for the conditions existing at the present time... To throw this system over we have got to organize as a class and fight them as class against class... and our weapons are education, organization and agitation... and the principles of Socialism, for it is necessary that you know when to strike and how to strike, and if we have not these weapons when the time comes, we shall not be able to predict the outcome of the fight... we have the power and the lever to overthrow the existing society."

== See also ==
- Ginger: The Life and Death of Albert Goodwin
