= Aaron Williams (writer) =

Canadian writer

Aaron Williams is a Canadian writer, most noted as the winner of the Edna Staebler Award in 2025 for his book The Last Logging Show: A Forestry Family at the End of an Era.

Born and raised in British Columbia, Williams worked as a logger and forest firefighter until changes in the logging industry led him to return to school to study creative writing at the University of King's College. He published his first book, Chasing Smoke: A Wildfire Memoir, in 2017, and received a shortlisted nomination for the Margaret and John Savage First Book Award, Non-Fiction at the 2018 Atlantic Book Awards & Festival.

The Last Logging Show, his second book, was published in 2024.

He is currently based in Nova Scotia.
