= Patsy Aldana =

Canadian children's book publisher

Patricia Aldana is a children's book publisher based in Canada. She is the founder and former publisher of Groundwood Books, past president of the International Board on Books for Young People (IBBY), former president of the IBBY Trust, and current publisher of Aldana Libros, an imprint of Greystone Kids. She was named to the Order of Canada in 2010 "for her contributions to children's publishing in Canada and around the world."

== Background ==
Aldana was born and brought up in Guatemala. She came to Canada in 1971, after attending Stanford University, where she received her Bachelor's Degree in Art History in 1968, and did post graduate work at Bryn Mawr College from 1968 to 1969, and the University of Toronto in 1972. She is a dual citizen of Guatemala and Canada.

She was married to writer Matt Cohen prior to his death in 1999.

== Career ==
Aldana founded Groundwood Books in 1978. During her tenure from 1978 to 2012, the publisher won 20 Governor General's Awards.

Under Aldana’s leadership, Groundwood was committed to finding, developing, and publishing authors and illustrators from communities who had been mostly absent from publishing programs in the past, including Chinese, Black, Sikh, Japanese and Hispanic Canadian communities. Most of these creators' books are still in print, have been published internationally and won awards.

Groundwood established a publishing presence in the United States in 1996, and became a leading publisher of books for the Latino market, publishing bilingual and Spanish books. Groundwood was also noted for its publication of books for children from around the world in translation.

Aldana was also the adult fiction publisher for Douglas & McIntyre for most of the 1980s and 1990s.

Aldana retired from Groundwood Books in 2012. From 2013 to 2018, she took on the task of acquiring and publishing a list of 8 to 10 picture books from around the world for the world-wide Chinese language market, published as The World Library by the China Children’s Press and Publication Group (CCPPG), China’s largest publishing company. She also helped to train the editors and staff at the CCPPG in the elements of what makes a quality children’s book, and worked closely with particular authors.

== Policy work ==
Aldana has been active throughout her career in Canadian organizations that involve publishing, promoting Canadian books, and policy. She was president of the Association of Canadian Publishers from 1978 to 1980, and on the founding board of the Canadian Children’s Book Centre. She was the founding president of the Canadian Coalition for School Libraries and the Organization of Book Publishers of Ontario.

Aldana was president of the Association of Canadian Publishers when the Book Publishing Development Program, now known as the Canada Book Fund, was established in 1979.

Aldana and her colleague Rick Wilks of Annick Press founded and were co-Chairs of the National Reading Campaign from 2009 to 2014. Their hope was for an organization that would bring policy focus in certain key areas, specifically reading for pleasure in schools, reading Canadian authors, and ensuring that Indigenous children had the same opportunity to become life-long readers as other Canadian children.

== International connections ==
Since the 1990s, Aldana has been involved in developing policy in publishing internationally and in building connections between publishers around the world.

Aldana was on the Executive Committee of the International Board on Books for Young People (IBBY) from 1996 to 2000 and 2004 to 2006, President from 2006 to 2010, and President of the IBBY Foundation and Trust from 2012 to the present.

In addition to her presidency, Aldana was Canada’s representative to the Inter American Publisher’s Group from 1996 to 2013. She was Chair of the Hans Christian Andersen Award from 2014 to 2018.

== Honors ==
Aldana was named to the Order of Canada in 2010. She has won two prizes in Canada for her work advocating children's and adult's freedom to read: the Writer's Union of Canada's Freedom to Read Award in 2013 and the Ontario Library Association's Les Fowlie Intellectual Freedom Award in 2011, as well as the IBBY Canada's Claude Aubry Award in 2012. Aldana received the Special Contribution Award at the 2014 Chen Bochui International Children's Literature Awards, and the Special Book Award from the Chinese government in 2016. In 2020, Aldana was named the 2021 Carle Honors Honoree in Mentorship.
