= White Lies (for My Mother) =

1992 non-fiction book by Liza Potvin

- First edition cover of Canadian release
- Author: 'Liza Potvin'
- Subject: Incest
- Publisher: NeWest Press
- Publication date: 1 March 1992
- Publication place: Canada
- Media type: Print (hardback and paperback)
- Pages: 224
- ISBN: 9780920897133

White Lies (for My Mother) is a non-fiction book, written by Canadian writer Liza Potvin, first published in March 1992 by NeWest Press. In the book, the author chronicles her "lost" childhood, as an incest victim, and the subsequent years of emotional turmoil, leading to recovery.

== Awards and honours ==
White Lies (for my mother) received the 1993 "Edna Staebler Award for Creative Non-Fiction". The book was also nominated for the 1992 "VanCity Book Award", and The Vancouver Sun's 1992 listing as one of the "Six Best Books of the Year".

== See also ==
- List of Edna Staebler Award recipients
