= Michael Poole (producer) =

Canadian film maker and author

Michael "Mike" Poole was a Canadian film maker and author. He began his career as a copy runner for the Vancouver Sun before becoming a reporter. He earned a journalism degree in the U.S. state of Virginia, started in the film business in the 1960s and went on to be a television producer for the Canadian Broadcasting Corporation for ten years. He then worked as a freelance filmmaker, spending two decades producing documentaries with the well-known Canadian environmentalist, David Suzuki. His books are Romancing Mary Jane: A Year in the Life of a Failed Marijuana Grower, Ragged Islands: A Journey by Canoe Through the Inside Passage and Rain Before Morning, a novel about Canadian draft dodgers during World War I. In his retirement Poole lived full-time on the Sunshine Coast, British Columbia, Canada with his wife Carole and his two beloved Labradors. He won the Edna Staebler Award, a Canadian literary award for creative nonfiction, in 1999 for Romancing Mary Jane: A Year in the Life of a Failed Marijuana Grower. He died of prostate cancer at the age of 74 in 2010.
