= Allan Casey =

Canadian writer

Allan Casey is a Canadian writer, whose book Lakeland: Journeys into the Soul of Canada, won the Governor General's Award for English non-fiction in 2010. The book was also a shortlisted nominee for the Edna Staebler Award.

Born in Regina, Saskatchewan, and raised in Prince Albert, Casey has written for a variety of publications, including Adbusters, Canadian Business, Canadian Geographic, Canadian Living, Reader's Digest and Books in Canada.
