= The Chimps of Fauna Sanctuary =

2011 book by Andrew Westoll

The Chimps of Fauna Sanctuary: A Canadian Story of Resilience and Recovery
- First edition cover of Canadian release
- Author: Andrew Westoll
- Subject: Animal sanctuary
- Genre: Non-fiction, book
- Publisher: HarperCollins
- Publication date: May 2011
- Publication place: Canada
- Media type: Print (hardback & paperback)
- Pages: 268 pp.
- ISBN: 9781554686490

The Chimps of Fauna Sanctuary: A Canadian Story of Resilience and Recovery is a non-fiction book, written by Canadian writer Andrew Westoll, first published in May 2011 by HarperCollins. In the book, the author chronicles the time he spent volunteering at the Fauna Sanctuary, an animal refuge in Quebec for chimpanzees that had been used for biomedical research.

== Synopsis ==
The Chimps of Fauna Sanctuary describes what chimpanzees endure as research subjects. Westoll explains that most were separated from their mothers at birth, injected with diseases and deadly viruses, repeatedly operated on, and frequently driven mad through isolation and social deprivation. The chimpanzees, whose life expectancy is similar to humans, had spent over a decade living in "horrific lab conditions". Speaking at the award ceremony for the 2012 "Charles Taylor Prize", Westoll said "he became attached to each of the animals", and that "the strong feelings remain". He continued by saying "this is why I write, so I can remember and experience my time with them again", concluding his speech saying: "I remember them all the time."

== Awards and honours ==
The Chimps of Fauna Sanctuary won the Charles Taylor Prize for Literary Non-Fiction (2012), and was shortlisted for the British Columbia's National Award for Canadian Non-Fiction and the Edna Staebler Award for Creative Non-Fiction (2012). It was named a "Book of the Year" by Quill & Quire, The Globe and Mail, Amazon.ca, and CTV's Canada AM.
