= Karen Pinchin =

Canadian writer and journalist

Karen Pinchin is a Canadian writer and journalist based in Nova Scotia. Born in Toronto, Pinchin has been the recipient of an Atlantic Journalism Award and a National Magazine Award for her work in journalism. Her 2023 book Kings of Their Own Ocean covers the history of the bluefin tuna, and was the recipient of the Dartmouth Book Award for Non-Fiction at the Atlantic Book Awards in 2024.

== Biography ==
Pinchin was born in Toronto, Ontario, and is based in Dartmouth, Nova Scotia. She attended Carleton University for journalism and history, Université Laval for French as a second language, Bard College for international affairs, and Northwest Culinary Academy for professional cooking. She earned her Master of Arts and Science from the Columbia Journalism School.

In 2017, Pinchin was the recipient of the Gold Award for Business Reporting at the Atlantic Journalism Awards, awarded for her article Catch and Release published in The Deep. In 2022, she won a National Magazine Award for her article Freeing Oysters from a Parasite's Hold published in Hakai Magazine.

Pinchin released her first book, Kings of Their Own Ocean, in 2023. The book covers the history of the bluefin tuna and how the species was nearly destroyed by overfishing. In her research for the book, she travelled to locations with large amounts of tuna for four years, including Nova Scotia, Maine, Portugal, and Japan. Pinchin's interest in bluefin tuna began in 2019, when she learned of the Rhode Island fisherman Al Anderson who had marked over 60,000 fish as a citizen science effort in the 1960s. Her book covers the story of Anderson and the migration of a specific tuna he caught named Amelia. The book was received positively by critics from The Wall Street Journal and The New Yorker, and was the winner of the Dartmouth Book Award for Non-Fiction at the 2024 Atlantic Book Awards. It was one of three finalists for the 2024 Edna Staebler Award for Creative Non-Fiction.

== Publications ==
=== Books ===
- Pinchin, Karen (2023). Kings of Their Own Ocean: Tuna, Obsession, and the Future of Our Seas. Toronto, ON: Knopf Canada. ISBN 978-1-0390-0064-3. OCLC 1346157645.

=== Selected articles ===
- Pinchin, Karen (15 June 2021). "Freeing Oysters from a Parasite's Hold". Hakai Magazine. British Columbia: Hakai Institute.
- — (2017). "Catch and Release". The Deep Magazine. Nova Scotia. Archived from the original on 8 November 2017.
