= Andrew Westoll =

Canadian writer

- Born: Andrew Westoll
- Spouse: Samantha Westoll
- Writing career
- Genres: Novelist, creative non-fiction
- Notable works: The Riverbones, The Chimps of Fauna Sanctuary

Andrew Westoll is a Canadian writer, who won the 2012 Charles Taylor Prize for his non-fiction book The Chimps of Fauna Foundation: A Canadian Story of Resilience and Recovery.

A primatologist, Westoll previously published the travel memoir The Riverbones, about a year he spent studying capuchin monkeys in Suriname, in 2008. He is also a contributor to The Walrus, Explore, Outpost and The Globe and Mail. He won a Canadian National Magazine Award in 2007 for his Explore article "Somewhere Up a Jungle River", an article that grew into a book, The Riverbones.

In 2016, he published The Jungle South of the Mountain, his first novel.

== Works ==
- The Riverbones (2008)
- The Chimps of Fauna Sanctuary (2011)
- The Jungle South of the Mountain (2016)

== Awards and honors ==
- 2012 Charles Taylor Prize for The Chimps of Fauna Sanctuary
- 2007 Gold National Magazine Award for "Somewhere Up a Jungle River"
