= T. H. Breen =

American historian

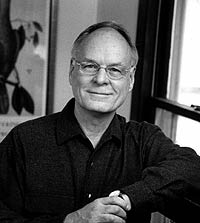
- Breen in September 2012

Personal details
- Born: September 5, 1942 (age 84) Ohio, U.S.
- Education: Yale University
- Profession: Historian; Author; Professor
- Awards: Guggenheim Fellowship; Humboldt Prize; National Endowment for the Humanities

Timothy H. Breen (born September 5, 1942 in Ohio) is an American professor, writer, and academic specialist on the colonial history of the United States.

He is currently the William Smith Mason Professor of American History Emeritus at Northwestern University and a James Marsh Professor at Large at the University of Vermont. He is the founding director of the Kaplan Humanities Center and the Nicholas D. Chabraja Center for Historical Studies at Northwestern.

== Early life and education ==
Breen was born in Ohio, on September 5, 1942, He received his B.A., M.A., and Ph.D in history from Yale University and has been awarded an honorary M.A. from Oxford University.

== Career ==
He has taught at the University of Cambridge as the Pitt Professor of American History and Institutions, at the University of Oxford as the Harold Vyvyan Harmsworth Professor of American History (2000-2001), both in England, and at the University of Chicago, Yale University, and California Institute of Technology. He is an honorary fellow of the Rothermere American Institute at the University of Oxford.

He has participated in a Guggenheim Fellowship and has also received research support from the National Endowment for the Humanities, Center for Advanced Study, the Humboldt Foundation, the National Humanities Center, the Mellon Foundation, the Munich Center for Advanced Study, the Historisches Kolleg in Munich, and the MacArthur Foundation.

Breen is a member of the British Royal Historical Society and also the Society of American Historians. An essay he published on the end of slavery in Massachusetts became the basis for the full-length opera "Slip-Knot" that was produced in Chicago. Breen is an alumnus of the Rachel Carson Center for Environmental History in Munich. He has written for the New York Review of Books, the Times Literary Supplement, The American Scholar, The New York Times, and the London Review of Books.

He is currently a professor of American history emeritus at Northwestern University.

Breen lives in Greensboro, Vermont. He is married to Susan, and has two children, Sarah and Bant, and three grandchildren.

== Published works ==
Breen is a specialist on the American Revolution and has studied the history of early America with a special interest in political thought, material culture, and cultural anthropology. Breen has published multiple books and over 60 articles. In 2010, he released American Insurgents, American Patriots: The Revolution of the People. Breen won the Colonial War Society Prize for the best book on the American Revolution for Marketplace of Revolution: How Consumer Politics Shaped American Independence (2004), the T. Saloutus Prize for agricultural history for his book Tobacco Culture: The Mentality of the Great Tidewater Planters of the Eve of Revolution, and the Historical Preservation Book Prize for his work Imagining the Past: East Hampton Histories, and several prizes for "George Washington's Journey: The President Forges a New Nation." Breen also holds awards for distinguished teaching from Northwestern.

=== Books ===
- 2026, The American Revolution on Trial: A New Nation Confronts the Burden of Independence
- 2019, The Will of the People: The Revolutionary Birth of America
- 2015, George Washington's Journey: The President Forges a New Nation
- 2010, American Insurgents – American Patriots: The Revolution of the People
- 2005, The Marketplace of Revolution: How Consumer Politics Shaped American Independence
- 2003, Colonial America in an Atlantic World: A Story of Creative Interaction, with Timothy D. Hall
- 1989, Imagining The Past: East Hampton Histories ISBN 0-8203-1810-8
- 1985, Tobacco Culture: The Mentality of the Great Tidewater Planters on the Eve of Revolution 2001 pbk edition. ISBN 0-691-08914-0.
- 1982, "Myne Owne Ground": Race and Freedom on Virginia's Eastern Shore, 1640-1676, with Stephen Innes
- 1980, Puritans and Adventurers: Change and Persistence in Early America
- 1970, The Character of the Good Ruler: A Study of Political Ideas in New England, 1630-1730

=== Textbooks ===
- 2010, America Past and Present, currently in 9th edition (1st ed. published 1984), with George M. Fredrickson, R. Hal Williams, Bill Brands, Ariela Gross, and Robert A. Divine.

=== Articles ===
- 2010, Whose Revolution is this?, Washington Post
- 2010, The Secret Founding Fathers, The Daily Beast
