= The Republic (newspaper) =

Defunct Canadian liberal local newspaper

- Editor: Kevin Potvin
- Founded: January 2000
- Ceased publication: June 2009
- Language: English
- Headquarters: East Vancouver
- Circulation: 12,000
- Website: www.republic-news.org

The Republic was a liberal local newspaper, published fortnightly from 2000 to 2009, in East Vancouver, an area of Vancouver, British Columbia, Canada.

Self-described as "independent and opinionated", The Republic addressed a variety of topics from city-level politics to issues across the world stage. Articles were for the most part in essay form, often containing both factual information and editorial comment.

The Republic was very open about its editorial policy, noting on the front page - "your biased media since 2000". This reference was in keeping with the paper's stance that there is no such thing as an unbiased media. The mission statement printed on the masthead further expands on editorial position:

The Republic of East Vancouver supports no party, advocates for no cause, represents no group, serves no master, and considers problems with no preconceived notions. We hope to afflict the comfortable and to comfort the afflicted, preferably at the same time.

The publisher and editor, Kevin Potvin, ran for political office as an independent candidate for Vancouver City Council in the 2005 election, but was not elected.

The Republic first came to citywide attention in 2000 by declaring the neighborhood of East Vancouver to be a sovereign state. Although humorous, it drew attention to several political issues, including the fact that life expectancy (at 71.1 years) and living conditions in the Downtown East Side (DTES) are significantly lower than in most of Canada.

The Republic claimed a circulation of approximately 12,000. This is both subscription readers and free distribution to a wide variety of local businesses across the Vancouver area.

In 2009, Potvin announced The Republic would be going on indefinite hiatus and saying he does not know "exactly when it will return." Regarding the reasons for the hiatus, Potvin posted:

There are a number of reasons. The chief one is, I can’t find anything to say with conviction anymore. I’ve lost the thrill, I guess. I certainly wouldn’t claim to have said everything that needs saying, but for the time being, I would claim to have at least said everything I am able to say.

Potvin further notes that, according to his estimates, after "nine-and-a-half years" of publication, he has "written and published 2 million words...the equivalent of 25 average-sized books" and "printed and distributed 1 million copies of the paper. Another round number emerges: stacked up, the pile would reach pretty much exactly 1 mile high."
