= Thomas Mackaman =

Professor of history and socialist politician (born 1975)

Thomas Mackaman (born 1975) is a historian and member of the Socialist Equality Party. He is a professor of history at Kings College in Wilkes-Barre, Pennsylvania. Mackaman has written and conducted interviews with historians challenging the New York Times' 1619 Project, first published on the World Socialist Web Site.

== Education and career ==
Mackaman attended University of Minnesota for his BA in history. He received a master of arts and a PhD in history from the University of Illinois Urbana-Champaign. While at the University of Illinois, Mackaman won awards for undergraduate teaching from the university. In 2023 he was named John H.A. Whitman Distinguished Service Professor.

Mackaman's New Immigrants and the Radicalization of American Labor was published in 2017. Mackaman has written on labor history, immigration history, and American history. He is active in public labor history, serving on the Anthracite Heritage Foundation and helped secure a historical marker for the 1919 Baltimore Mine Tunnel disaster.

== 1619 Project Controversy ==
After the 2019 publication of the New York Times' 1619 Project, Mackaman conducted interviews with a number of noted historians, including James McPherson, Gordon S. Wood, James Oakes, Clayborne Carson, and Richard Carwardine. The interviews asserted that the 1619 Project had committed conceptual and factual errors. Rod Dreher wrote an appreciative opinion piece about them in The American Conservative. The interviews, along with essays by Mackaman, David North, and other writers, were assembled in a book, The New York Times and Racialist Falsification of History.

== Socialist Equality Party ==
Mackaman ran for state legislature in Illinois in 2004 as a Socialist Equality Party candidate in the 103rd District covering the Champaign-Urbana area. The SEP’s World Socialist Website asserted that the state Democratic Party attempted to keep his name off the ballot by challenging the veracity of petitions, but the state election board ruled against the Democrats’ claims. Mackaman won 3.52% of the vote, while Democrat Naomi Jakobsson was returned to the Illinois House of Representatives.

Mackaman has written extensively for the World Socialist Web Site, especially on topics related to American history.

== Works ==
- David North, Tom Mackaman: The New York Times’ 1619 Project and the Racialist Falsification of History (2021) ISBN 1893638936
- Thomas Mackaman: New Immigrants and the Radicalization of American Labor, 1914-1924 (2017) ISBN 978-1476662497
- Shannon Jones, Tom Mackaman: Lincoln and the Emancipation Proclamation
- Tom Mackaman: 40 Years since the PATCO Strike
- Tom Mackaman: Thirty Years Since the PATCO Strike
