= Terese Marie Mailhot =

First Nations Canadian writer, journalist, and teacher

- Born: 14 June 1983 (age 43)
- Education: New Mexico State University; Institute of American Indian Arts; Purdue University
- Occupations: Writer; Journalist; Memoirist; Teacher
- Spouse: Casey Gray (divorced)
- Children: 3
- Writing career
- Years active: 2015-present
- Genre: Memoir
- Website: TereseMailhot.com

Terese Marie Mailhot (born 15 June 1983) is a First Nations Canadian writer, journalist, memoirist, and teacher.

== Early life and education ==
Mailhot grew up in Seabird Island, British Columbia, on the Seabird Island First Nation reservation. Her mother, Wahzinak, was a healer, social worker, poet, and radical activist, and her father, Ken Mailhot, was an artist. Her father had been incarcerated and was an alcoholic who molested Mailhot when she was young, and was often violent. Mailhot's mother had a letter-writing relationship with Salvador Agron, and shared the correspondence with musician Paul Simon, who used them for his Broadway musical, The Capeman. The role of Wahzinak was portrayed by Sara Ramirez in the musical. She is one of four children. As a child Mailhot had tuberculosis. She was in foster care periodically and eventually aged out of the system.

Mailhot's background is Nlaka'pamux, part of the indigenous First Nations people of the Interior Salish language group in southern British Columbia. Her maternal grandmother, who she was close to, was raised in the brutal Canadian Indian residential school system.

Mailhot got her GED and attended community college. Mailhot graduated with a bachelor's degree in English from New Mexico State University. In 2016, Mailhot received an MFA in fiction from the Institute of American Indian Arts.

== Career ==
Mailhot was a columnist at Indian Country Today and was Saturday Editor at The Rumpus. She taught English and composition at Dona Ana Community College in Las Cruces, New Mexico.

In 2017, Mailhot became a post-doctoral fellow at the English Department at Purdue University, where she works with the Native American Educational and Cultural Center. Mailhot is also a professor at the Institute of American Indian Arts.

In 2018, Mailhot released her debut book, Heart Berries: A Memoir. Heart Berries deals with sexual abuse, trauma, violence, substance abuse, going hungry, being poor, and neglect. Mailhot has said she sees her journey as being one that reflects intergenerational trauma and genocide. She uses the term "Indian sick" to describe the idea of cleansing the heart and mind in a spiritual process, which is how her community often processes these experiences. The title Heart Berries comes from a story about the healer O'dimin, the Heart Berry Boy, that an Ojibwe friend who is a language teacher told her. The book received overwhelmingly positive reviews in both popular and specialist sources. In March 2018, actress Emma Watson chose Mailhot's book as one of the monthly selections for her book club on Goodreads. Heart Berries is a New York Times bestseller.

Mailhot began writing her memoir while she was institutionalized in a mental institution. Mailhot had committed herself after having a mental breakdown related to dealing with childhood sexual abuse by her father. The book consists of many essays that Mailhot wrote during her years as an MFA student. Some of the book is written from Mailhot to her then-partner, Casey Gray, using an epistolary approach to reflecting on memories of the past.

== Personal life ==
Mailhot has discussed that she suffers from both post-traumatic stress disorder and bipolar II disorder.

Mailhot was married as a teenager and later married the writer Casey Gray. She has four sons.

== Fellowships ==
- 2015: Southwestern Association for Indian Arts (SWAIA), Discovery Fellowship
- 2016: Vermont Studio Center, VSC/Institute of American Indian Arts (IAIA) Creative Writing Fellowship
- Writing by Writers, Fellowship
- Elk Writer's Workshop, Fellowship
- 2017: Purdue University, Tecumseh Postdoctoral Fellow

== Selected works and publications ==
=== Selected publications ===
- Mailhot, Terese-Marie (15 January 2015). "Heart Berries". Carve Magazine.
- Mailhot, Terese Marie (May 2015). "Bad Indians". Juxtapose Literary Magazine. 2.
- Mailhot, Terese (7 May 2015). "Happy Mother's Day to the Rez Chicks". Indian Country Today.
- Mailhot, Terese (10 May 2015). "'But My Best Friend Is White': Racism as Satire". Indian Country Today.
- Mailhot, Terese Marie (18 August 2015). "I Know I'll Go". Burrow Press.
- Mailhot, Teresa Marie (7 September 2015). "Dead Letter Office: Indian Sick". The Offing.
- Mailhot, Terese Marie (November 2015). "Diving Duck". Storyscape Literary Journal (15).
- Mailhot, Terese Marie (2 February 2016). "Nlaka'pamux, Immediately". The James Franco Review.
- Mailhot, Terese Marie (2016). "Paul Simon Money". Transmotion. 2 (1&2). University of Kent: 131–135.
- Mailhot, Terese (17 July 2016). "Journey to Starbucks: A White Way of Knowledge". Indian Country Today.
- Mailhot, Terese (1 April 2017). "Self-Help Isn't Enough for Native Women". Indian Country Today.
- Mailhot, Terese (8 June 2017). "Quality and Control: How Native Artists Have Failed to Criticize Each Other". Indian Country Today.
- Mailhot, Terese (14 July 2017). "The Decolonization of My Story". Indian Country Today.
- Mailhot, Terese Marie (29 August 2017). "John Smelcer's 'Stealing Indians' no longer a contender for PEN Center USA prize". Los Angeles Times.
- Mailhot, Terese; Bearhart, Bryan, eds. (Fall 2017). "Yellow Medicine Review". Yellow Medicine Review: A Journal of Indigenous Literature, Art & Thought.
- Mailhot, Terese (8 February 2018). "Original Essays: Writing From Pain Saved Me". Powell's Books.
- Mailhot, Terese (12 February 2018). "I Used to Give Men Mercy". Guernica.
- Mailhot, Terese Marie (Winter 2018). "Tender Thing". West Branch Wired. Bucknell University.

=== Books ===
- Mailhot, Terese Marie; Alexie, Sherman (introduction by); Kane, Joan Naviyuk (afterword by) (2018). Heart Berries: A Memoir. Berkeley, CA: Counterpoint. ISBN 978-1-619-02334-5. OCLC 994578253.
  - Mailhot, Terese Marie (21 February 2018). "Getting Through School Let Me Talk About Pain". Literary Hub. – Excerpt

== See also ==
- List of writers from peoples indigenous to the Americas
