= Alison Watt (writer) =

Canadian writer, and painter (born 1957)

Alison Watt (born 1957) is a Canadian writer, and painter born in Winnipeg, Manitoba, Watt grew up in Victoria, British Columbia. She studied biology (BSC) at Simon Fraser University and Creative Writing (MFA) at the University of British Columbia. She has worked as Education Coordinator at the VanDusen Botanical Garden in Vancouver, a tour leader in Central and South America, and a naturalist aboard the west coast schooner Maple Leaf, sailing among British Columbia's Gulf Islands, Haida Gwaii, the Great Bear Rainforest, and Alaska. She has taught art to adults since 1995, in her studio on Protection Island, Nanaimo, British Columbia, in other venues. Since 2020 she has offered courses online, through her business ARTWORK ARTPLAY.

== Career ==
Watt's book The Last Island: A Naturalist's Sojourn on Triangle Island is a memoir about life and death on a remote seabird colony. The book won the Edna Staebler Award in 2003. She is also an award-winning poet. Her first book of poetry, Circadia, was published in 2006 by Toronto's Pedlar Press. In this collection, scenes of ordinary life unfold in a backdrop of light cycles, tides, and weather, and attempt to capture the lyricism of the processes of nature. Some are set in an Amazon Research station and explore taxonomy and diversity. In others, she moves past nature as a backdrop to delve more deeply into its inner, often invisible workings, such as photosynthesis and pollination, to release them from the language of science. Her novel, Dazzle Patterns set in Halifax during and after the explosion of 1917, and in the battlefields of France, is a story about loss, the resilience of the human spirit, and the transformative power of art. It was a finalist for the Amazon Canada First Novel Award.

Dazzle Patterns The book was a shortlisted finalist for the 2018 amazon.ca First Novel Award. Watt has illustrated her published books.

A fine artist, she has had many solo and group shows. Her work ranges from formal watercolour botanicals reflecting the blend of science and art of her background, to large semi-abstracts in acrylic. She has given numerous courses in botanical painting at Malaspina University-College in Nanaimo. In addition she has taught watercolour and acrylic painting in her studio on Protection Island.

== Awards ==
- 2002 – "Edna Staebler Award for Creative Non-Fiction" for a Canadian writer's first or second book
- Backwater Review poetry prize
- subTerrain magazine poetry prize
- Bliss Carman competition – 2nd place

== Bibliography ==
- The Last Island: A Naturalist's Sojourn on Triangle Island. Harbour Publishing.
- Circadia. Pedlar Press.
- Poems from the Basement. Leaf Press.
- The Invention of Birds. Leaf Press.
- "Dazzle Patterns". Freehand Books
