= Catherine Gildiner =

American psychologist

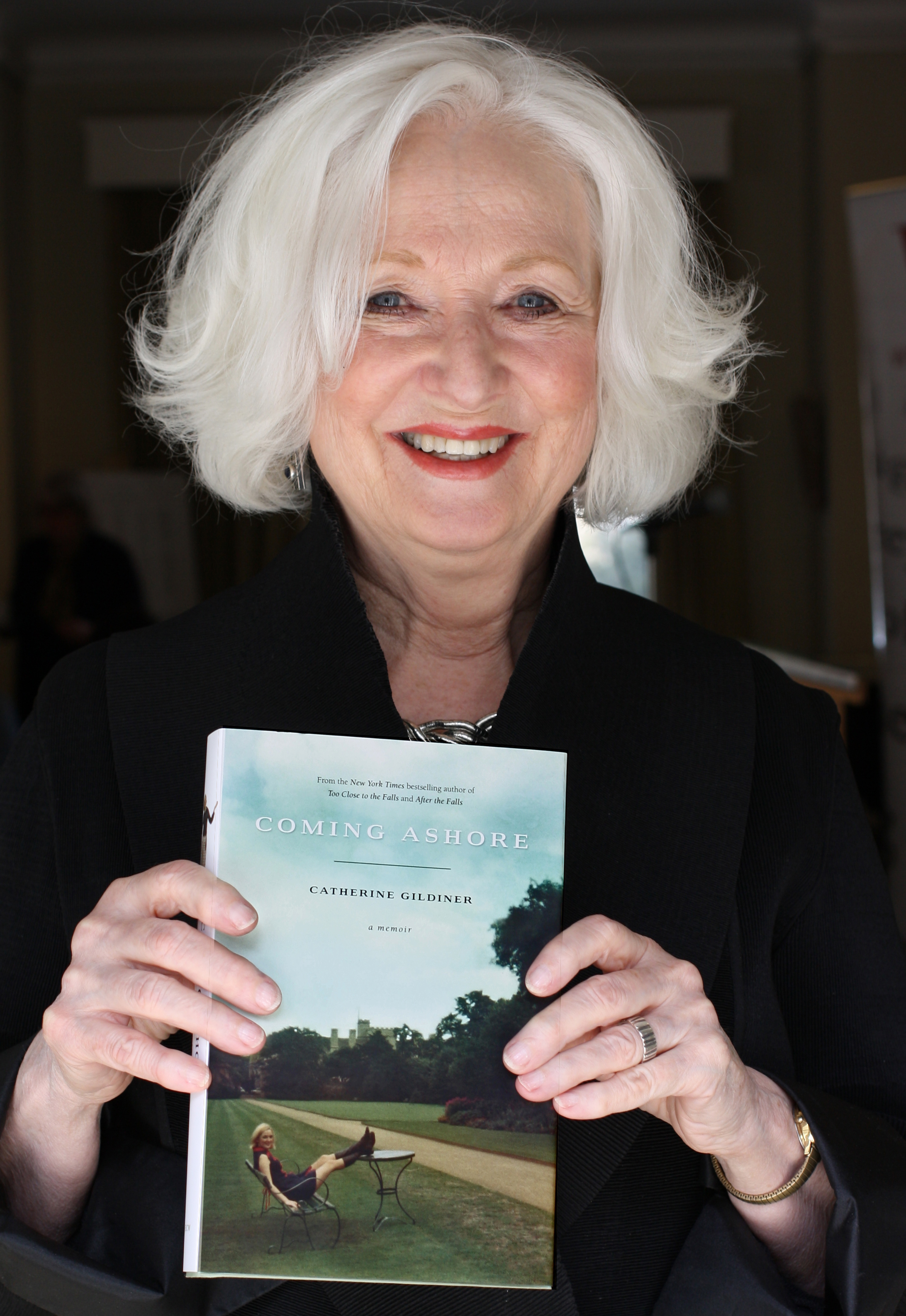
- Gildiner holding a copy of the third installment in her memoir trilogy, Coming Ashore
- Born: Catherine McClure; 1948 (age 77–78); Lewiston, New York, U.S.
- Education: B.A. in English Literature (1970), M.A. in Psychology(1975), PhD in psychology(1983) – Influence of Darwin on Freud
- Occupations: Clinical psychologist, author

Catherine Gildiner (born 1948) is an American–Canadian author and clinical psychologist.

== Personal life ==
Gildiner was born in Lewiston, New York, was later raised in Niagara Falls, New York, and spent her teen years in Amherst near Buffalo.

Gildiner's latest biographical segment describes her time at the University of Oxford's Trinity College starting in 1968 where she was one of only two female students (both American) studying literature, and where the clashes of American and British culture provided many interesting and entertaining episodes. She managed her entry into Oxford partly on the strength of a poem on Milton's Paradise Lost which she wrote after ingesting a friend's psycho-pharmaceutical that was supposed to keep her awake long enough to finish her essay. According to her autobiography, this was the only poem she'd "ever written before or since", and it allowed her to leave the US where she had been questioned by the FBI over her involvement with a boyfriend who was a part of the Black Panther Party movement. Her time in England included encounters with both Bill Clinton and Jimi Hendrix.

After Oxford, Gildiner finished her bachelor's degree at Ohio University, followed by teaching at Thomas Paine High School, scene of recent race riots, where she successfully engaged black students that had been given up as a lost cause by some of her colleagues.

A scholarship allowed her to attend Victoria College at the University of Toronto for her master's degree with leading Coleridge scholar Kathleen Coburn. First she shared student quarters with men that turned out to be allied with the FLQ, resulting in her being questioned again, this time by Canadian police, followed by free rent at a high-rise that was revealed as a centre for illegal drug trade. Despite her turbulent residences, she managed to finish both her master's degree, and her PhD

Gildiner lives in Toronto with her husband of 40 years, Michael, and their three sons.

== Writing career ==
Gildiner wrote the biographical trilogy "Too Close to the Falls", "After the Falls", and "Coming Ashore", covering, respectively, her life from age 4 to 12, age 12 to 21, and age 21 to 27. One review of "After the Falls" described Gildiner's memoir as "refreshingly honest, touching and witty" and "vital and earnest, with a wicked sense of humour, she is trouble with a heart."

In 2015, Buffalo News author Anne Neville published concerns about the veracity of Gildiner's memoirs.

== Publications ==
Biographies:

- "Too Close to the Falls" (1999)
- "After the Falls" (2010)
- "Coming Ashore" (2014)

Novels:

- "Seduction" (2005)

Non-Fiction:

- "Good Morning, Monster" (2019)

== Awards and honours ==
- Gildiner received the Canadian Different Drummer award
