= Heart Berries =

Book by Terese Marie Mailhot

- First edition
- Author: Terese Marie Mailhot
- Publisher: Counterpoint
- Publication date: February 6, 2018
- Publication place: United States
- Pages: 160
- ISBN: 978-1619023345
- OCLC: 1050312544

Heart Berries: A Memoir is the debut book from First Nation Canadian writer Terese Marie Mailhot. It follows Mailhot through her troubled childhood, early and tumultuous motherhood, and into her adult struggles with mental health and personal identity. Maillot's memoir covers many topics relevant to the lives of Indigenous women, including Missing and Murdered Indigenous Women. It reached 14 on The New York Times Best Seller list for hardback non-fiction, and was a finalist for the Hilary Weston Writers' Trust Prize for Nonfiction. A number of critics have noted, both positively and negatively, the unique style of the piece, yet despite or because of this, it has received a warm reception and overall praise.

== Overview ==
The first edition opens with a foreword by Spokane-Coeur d'Alene-American novelist Sherman Alexie, offering what one reviewer characterized as "glowing introduction", and praising Mailhot as the "biological child of a broken healer and a lonely artist." (Note: It was later announced that future editions of the book will no longer include the introduction by Alexie, following allegations of sexual misconduct.)

The main body proceeds as a series of essays which explore Mailhot's experiences growing up on the Seabird Island Indian Reservation in British Columbia, including her first marriage as a teenager, and the loss of custody of her first child on the same day she gave birth to her second. It offers insight into Mailhot's struggle with her mental health, including PTSD and bipolar disorder. It explores her experience after committing herself to a mental institution following a breakdown. It was there that she began writing Heart Berries, according to an interview with the Canadian Broadcasting Corporation, "In those spaces of mental health, there weren't any First Nations counsellors and there weren't any people who understand genocide and what it looks like to come from a culture that has thrived in spite of so much." She then turned to her writing as "a way to avoid my workbook and group therapy … but ultimately writing the truth of what I experienced was something kind of shocking".

The book explores Mailhot's familial connections with her mother, father, and grandmother, her mother's habit of bringing predatory men into the lives of her family, and her father's reckless lawlessness, culminating eventually in his own violent death. It also follows her growing relationship with writer Casey Gray, the white man who would become her second husband, and thematically, at once "a figure of the beloved and a symbol of persecution". After reading Heart Berries himself, Grey comments that, "It did kind of open up and help me understand her more and the depth of what she's gone through and frankly the hurt I caused her," he says. "It was really beautiful and really hard to read, frankly. And I knew it was powerful and I knew it was amazing."

The afterword for the book is a question and answer session between Mailhot and Inupiaq American poet Joan Naviyuk Kane.

== Family ==
Terese Marie Mailhot's mother, Karen Joyce Bobb Wahzinak, was featured as a character in Paul Simon's play. Terese Marie Mailhot's father Ken Paquette starred in a documentary Hope which was directed by filmmakers Stuart Reaugh and Thomas Buchan.

== Reception ==
The Los Angeles Times described Heart Berries as "poetic, urgent, short, brutal and at times darkly humorous". The New York Times described it as "a sledgehammer", and although perhaps lacking in some focus, ultimately determined "give me narrative power and ambition over tidiness any day." Writing in The Guardian, Diana Evans dubbed the book "startling", and full of,

...raw and ragged pain, the poisonous effects of sexual abuse, of racial cruelty, of violence and self-harm and drug addiction. But it is not without a wry, deadpan humour and clever derision. Its quiet rage is directed outwards towards the intangible yet definitive (white supremacy, male supremacy), the unjust shape of the world, while a deep tenderness and empathy are shown to those who share in the author's vulnerability...

The Atlantic's Joe Fassler criticized the book's lack of exposition, writing that it "does everything it technically shouldn't, brushing off the familiar regimen prescribed by MFA programs, and slipping the strictures of commercial publishing." However, he continues, that "the thrilling part is, it works," and in the end is "a reminder that, in the right hands, literature can do anything it wants." The Star Tribune similarly noted the unique style of the work, describing it as having an effect that is both "spooky and powerful," but adding that, "although many critics have described this book with stuttering superlatives, readers will differ on whether it is poetic or incoherent, brilliant self-examination or wordy narcissism."

As of April 2018, Heart Berries had reached number 14 on The New York Times Best Seller list in the hardback non-fiction category. It was a finalist for the 2018 Hilary Weston Writers' Trust Prize for Nonfiction, with the winner to be announced on November 7, 2018. It was also named one of the best non-fiction books of 2018 by TIME, and reached number 10 on the Toronto Star's best seller list for Canadian non-fiction.

== See also ==
- There There (novel), 2018 debut novel by Cheyenne and Arapaho author Tommy Orange
