= Kevin Potvin =

Newspaper publisher and columnist

Kevin Potvin (born 1962 in Port Arthur, Ontario) is a newspaper publisher and columnist, small business owner, and politician based in Vancouver, British Columbia. He founded and runs the Magpie Magazine Gallery, a retail store on Commercial Drive, and The Republic of East Vancouver, an alternative bi-weekly newspaper. Since 1995 he has written a regular opinion column in the Vancouver Courier. His forays into electoral politics have proven controversial, particularly because of his views on Canadian and American foreign policy.

== Politics ==
In 2005 Potvin ran for councillor in the Vancouver municipal election. He received 10,806 votes, placing 22nd in the polls (with the first ten being elected to council), gaining the most votes for an independent.

In the fall of 2006, he was elected president of the Grandview-Woodland Area Council.

On 15 April 2007, Elizabeth May, leader of the Green Party of Canada, issued a release stating that Potvin would not be allowed to run as a candidate in the riding of Vancouver-Kingsway. The decision was made after a controversy developed over an article Potvin wrote following the September 11 attacks (see below). May cited Potvin's remarks as "antithetical" to Green Party values.

== Controversies ==
=== Globe and Mail report ===
On May 6, 2006, The Globe and Mail printed an article on the debate over Kevin Potvin's entry on himself. Potvin told The Globe and Mail that he created the entry as part of his political campaign to get elected to Vancouver City Council.

Regarding Potvin's claim that his work had appeared in Harper's Magazine and The Atlantic Monthly, the paper said: "According to Harper's magazine, Mr. Potvin had a letter to the editor printed once, in November of 1992. The Atlantic could find no record of Mr. Potvin -- he says he wrote 'a substantial letter to the editor' in 1987, but the magazine does not archive letters."

According to the newspaper, when asked about his Wikipedia entry, Potvin "disagreed that it was misleading, or that he inflated his résumé." Potvin said that he did not know the identity of the editor who added the "investigative reporting" accolades to the Wikipedia article. "'I have my readers,' he added, 'and I think there are people who would say that. It's not a thing which you can be factually wrong or right about. I think I am an investigative journalist. I investigate. I write. But I think facts are just what people say they are.'"

Potvin wrote a rejoinder in The Republic claiming that the Globe and Mail article was motivated by its author's personal dislike of him and his criticism of the journalism taught in journalism schools. In making his case, Potvin pointed out that while the article was ostensibly about the accuracy of Wikipedia, the encyclopedia was mentioned 12 times in the article compared with 26 references to himself, "who is, on the national stage, a nobody." The editor of the Globe and Mail, however, rejected Potvin's arguments and refused to print a retraction.

Potvin has also been a contributor to the Globe and Mail.

=== Remarks about 9/11 attacks ===
On April 12, 2007, Public Eye Online reported that Potvin had written an article in 2002 about the September 11, 2001 attacks in which he reported his reaction to the planes hitting the twin towers.

He wrote, "When I saw the first tower cascade down into that enormous plume of dust and paper, there was a little voice inside me that said, 'Yeah!' When the second tower came down the same way, that little voice said, 'Beautiful!' When the visage of the Pentagon appeared on the TV with a gaping and smoking hole in its side, that little voice had nearly taken me over, and I felt an urge to pump my fist in the air"

Potvin subsequently told the press, "If you read the story that I wrote, you'll notice that I'm talking about it on a symbolic level . . . I go to great pains to make clear that I'm not talking about the deaths of anybody. After all, as you can imagine, I'm a human being. I'm a father, I'm a hockey dad, I'm a businessman, I'm a community leader. I'm obviously not going to be revelling in the deaths of anybody."

In regards to 9/11 conspiracy theories, he has stated that he does not believe the official version of the events on September 11, 2001 is any more credible than alternative explanations.
