= British Columbia Federation of Labour =

Canadian trade union centre

- Abbreviation: BCFED; BCFL
- Formation: 1910
- Type: Trade union centre
- Headquarters: Burnaby, British Columbia, Canada
- Location: British Columbia, Canada
- Members: 500,000 (2024)
- President: Sussanne Skidmore
- Secretary-treasurer: Hermender Singh Kailley
- Parent organization: Canadian Labour Congress
- Website: bcfed.ca

The British Columbia Federation of Labour (BCFED), often shortened to the BC Federation of Labour, is a central organization for organized labour in British Columbia, Canada. It was founded in 1910 and has 500,000 members.

== History ==
The BCFED was formed in 1910. In 1917, the BCFED adopted a resolution opposing Canada's recently passed Military Service Act, which mandated conscription for military age men.

The BCFED published a newspaper, The B.C. Federationist. The newspaper had a circulation of 40,000 workers throughout Western Canada and has been characterized as a revolutionary trade unionist publication. The paper was used to distribute socialist messaging, including "Left-Wing" Communism: An Infantile Disorder by Vladimir Lenin.
