= Douglas & McIntyre =

Canadian Publishing House

Douglas and McIntyre (2013) Ltd.
- Founded: 1971
- Founder: Jim Douglas and Scott McIntyre
- Country of origin: Canada
- Headquarters location: Vancouver
- Distribution: University of Toronto Press (Canada); Publishers Group West (US)
- Publication types: Books
- Imprints: Douglas & McIntyre
- Official website: www.douglas-mcintyre.com

Douglas and McIntyre (2013) Ltd. is a Canadian book publishing firm.

Douglas & McIntyre was founded by James Douglas and Scott McIntyre in 1971 as an independent publishing company based in Vancouver. Reorganized with new owners in 2008 as D&M Publishers Inc., it bought New Society Publishers. In October 2012 the company filed a Notice of Intention (NOI) under the Canadian bankruptcy act. D&M Publishers sold off its imprints while under NOI protection; New Society returned to its previous owners, the imprint Greystone Books was sold to a group headed by Heritage House Publishing and set up as a stand-alone company called Greystone Books Ltd. while the original Douglas & McIntyre list was sold to the owners of Harbour Publishing who placed it under a new independent company, Douglas and McIntyre (2013) Ltd.

It is the publisher of Douglas Coupland, poet Robert Bringhurst, anthropologist Wade Davis, chef Rob Feenie, artists Bill Reid and Michael Nicoll Yahgulanaas; and the journalist Susan Delacourt. Its full titles list stands at over 1000, with over 500 active titles.
