= Greystone Books =

Canadian book publisher

- Industry: Book publishing
- Predecessor: Douglas & McIntyre
- Founded: 2013
- Founder: Rob Sanders
- Headquarters: Vancouver, Canada
- Area served: Canada
- Key people: Jen Gauthier, publisher; Patsy Aldana, publisher (Aldana Libros)
- Brands: Greystone Kids, Aldana Libros
- Website: greystonebooks.com

Greystone Books is a Canadian book publisher. Initially an imprint of Douglas & McIntyre, the Vancouver-based company became its own entity in 2013.

== History ==
Greystone Books was an imprint of Douglas & McIntyre, and won the CBA Libris Award for Marketing Achievement of the Year in 2007. After Douglas & McIntyre went bankrupt in 2013, publisher Rob Sanders bought Greystone Books and launched it as an independent company.

In 2017, the company won the Jim Douglas Publisher of the Year Award. In 2019, the company launched the Greystone Kids and its Aldana Libros imprint to focus on English translations of global children's book titles. Patsy Aldana is the publisher of Aldana Libros.

Jen Gauthier took over as publisher of Greystone Books on January 1, 2022.

== Activities ==
The company is based in Vancouver, and is known for its publication of English language books about people, the planet, and nature.
