= Creative nonfiction =

Genre of writing

Creative nonfiction is a genre of writing that heavily makes use of figurative techniques to create narratives that are otherwise factually accurate. Creative nonfiction has also been known by other names, including but not limited to "belles lettres", "literature of fact", "literature of reality" and "verfabula". While both the flagship publication in the genre and the first MFA program in the genre used the name creative nonfiction, the origin of the name is unknown. Creative nonfiction contrasts with other nonfiction, such as academic, technical or journalistic writing, which are also rooted in accurate fact but not written to entertain based on prose style. Many writers view creative nonfiction as overlapping with the essay.

== Characteristics and definition ==
For a text to be considered creative nonfiction, it must be factually accurate and written with attention to literary style and technique. Lee Gutkind, founder of the magazine Creative Nonfiction, wrote, "Ultimately, the primary goal of the creative nonfiction writer is to communicate information, just like a reporter, but to shape it in a way that reads like fiction." A shorter, simpler definition of creative nonfiction was used by Creative Nonfiction: "True stories, well told." Forms within this genre include memoir, diary, travel writing, food writing, narrative journalism, chronicle, personal essays, and other hybridized essays, as well as some biography and autobiography. Critic Chris Anderson claims that the genre can be understood best by splitting it into two subcategories—the personal essay and the journalistic essay—but the genre is currently defined by its lack of established conventions.

Literary critic Barbara Lounsberry in her book, The Art of Fact, suggests four constitutive characteristics of the genre: the first is "Documentable subject matter chosen from the real world as opposed to 'invented' from the writer's mind". By this, she means that the topics and events discussed in the text verifiably exist in the natural world. The second characteristic is "Exhaustive research", which she claims allows writers "novel perspectives on their subjects" and "also permits them to establish the credibility of their narratives through verifiable references in their texts". The third characteristic that Lounsberry claims is crucial in defining the genre is "The scene". She stresses the importance of describing and revivifying the context of events in contrast to the typical journalistic style of objective reportage. The fourth and final feature she suggests is "Fine writing: a literary prose style". "Verifiable subject matter and exhaustive research guarantee the nonfiction side of literary nonfiction; the narrative form and structure disclose the writer's artistry; and finally, its polished language reveals that the goal all along has been literature." Essayist and critic Phillip Lopate describes 'reflection' as a necessary element of the genre, offering the advice that the best literary nonfiction "captures the mind at work".

Creative nonfiction may be structured like traditional fiction narratives, as is true of Fenton Johnson's story of love and loss, Geography of the Heart, and Virginia Holman's Rescuing Patty Hearst. When book-length works of creative nonfiction follow a story-like arc, they are sometimes called narrative nonfiction. Other books, such as Daniel Levitin's This Is Your Brain on Music and The World in Six Songs, use elements of narrative momentum, rhythm, and poetry to convey a literary quality. Creative nonfiction often escapes traditional boundaries of narrative altogether, as happens in the bittersweet banter of Natalia Ginzburg's essay, "He and I", in John McPhee's hypnotic tour of Atlantic City, In Search of Marvin Gardens, and in Ander Monson's playful, experimental essays in Neck-Deep and Other Predicaments.

Creative nonfiction writers have embraced new ways of forming their texts—including online technologies—because the genre leads itself to grand experimentation. Dozens of new journals have sprung up—both in print and online—that feature creative nonfiction prominently in their offerings. Though the rise of AI, creative writers face massive problems according to an article from Duke Trinity College of Arts and Sciences, "When we offload the generation of ideas, images, and language to an LLM, we are, to quote Duke professor Thoman Pfau, ‘actively ceding agency’ to a machine–and thus depriving ourselves of the inherent goods that come from exercising our own creativity.”.

== Ethics and accuracy ==
Writers of creative or narrative non-fiction often discuss the level, and limits, of creative invention in their works and the limitations of memory to justify the approaches they have taken to relating true events. Melanie McGrath, whose book Silvertown, an account of her grandmother's life, is "written in a novelist's idiom", writes in the follow-up, Hopping, that the known facts of her stories are "the canvas on to which I have embroidered. Some of the facts have slipped through the holes—we no longer know them nor have any means of verifying them—and in these cases I have reimagined scenes or reconstructed events in a way I believe reflects the essence of the scene or the event in the minds and hearts of the people who lived through it. ... To my mind this literary tinkering does not alter the more profound truth of the story."

This concept of fact vs. fiction is elaborated upon in Brenda Miller and Suzanne Paola's book Tell It Slant. Nuala Calvi, authors of The Sugar Girls, a novelistic story based on interviews with former sugar-factory workers, make a similar point: "Although we have tried to remain faithful to what our interviewees have told us, at a distance of over half a century many memories are understandably incomplete, and where necessary we have used our own research, and our imaginations, to fill in the gaps. ... However, the essence of the stories related here is true, as they were told to us by those who experienced them at first hand."

In the late 20th and early 21st centuries, there have been several well-publicized incidents of memoir writers who exaggerated or fabricated certain facts in their work. For example:

- In 1998, Swiss writer and journalist Daniel Ganzfried revealed that Binjamin Wilkomirski's memoir Fragments: Memories of a Wartime Childhood, detailing his experiences as a child survivor of the Holocaust, contained factual inaccuracies.
- The James Frey controversy hit in 2006, when The Smoking Gun website revealed that Frey's memoir, A Million Little Pieces, contained experiences that turned out to be fabrications.
- In 2008, The New York Times featured an article about the memoirist Margaret Seltzer, whose pen name is Margaret B. Jones. Her publisher, Riverhead Books, canceled the publication of Seltzer's book, Love and Consequences, when it was revealed that Seltzer's story of her alleged experiences growing up as a half-white, half-Native American foster child and Bloods gang member in South Central Los Angeles were fictitious.

Although there have been instances of traditional and literary journalists falsifying their stories, the ethics applied to creative nonfiction are the same as those that apply to journalism. The truth is meant to be upheld, just told in a literary fashion. Essayist John D'Agata explores the issue in his 2012 book The Lifespan of a Fact. It examines the relationship between truth and accuracy, and whether it is appropriate for a writer to substitute one for the other. He and fact-checker Jim Fingal have an intense debate about the boundaries of creative nonfiction, or "literary nonfiction".

== Literary criticism ==
There is very little published literary criticism of creative nonfiction works, despite the fact that the genre is often published in respected publications such as The New Yorker, Vanity Fair, Harper's, and Esquire. A handful of the most widely recognized writers in the genre such as Robert Caro, Gay Talese, Joseph Mitchell, Tom Wolfe, John McPhee, Joan Didion, John Perkins, Ryszard Kapuściński, Helen Garner and Norman Mailer have seen some criticism on their more prominent works. "Critics to date, however, have tended to focus on only one or two of each writer's works, to illustrate particular critical point." As the popularity of the genre continues to expand, many nonfiction authors and a handful of literary critics are calling for more extensive literary analysis of the genre. The genre of the personal essay is periodically subject to predictions of its demise.

If, these four features delimit an important art form of our time, a discourse grounded in fact but artful in execution that might be called literary nonfiction, what is needed is serious critical attention of all kinds to this work: formal criticism (both Russian formalism and New Criticism), historical, biographical, cultural, structuralist and deconstructionist, reader-response criticism and feminist (criticism).

— Barbara Lounsberry, The Art of Fact

Nonfiction is no longer the bastard child, the second class citizen; literature is no longer reified, mystified, unavailable. This is the contribution that poststructuralist theory has to make to an understanding of literary nonfiction, since poststructuralist theorists are primarily concerned with how we make meaning and secure authority for claims in meaning of language.

— Chris Anderson, Literary Nonfiction: Theory, Criticism, Pedagogy

== See also ==
- Docufiction
- Documentary film
- Ethnofiction
- Gonzo journalism
- New Journalism
- Nonfiction novel
- Roman à clef
- True crime
- Long-form journalism
