= 1992 in literature =

This article contains information about the literary events and publications of 1992.

== Events ==
- July – The Goosebumps series of children's horror fiction, penned by R. L. Stine, is first published in the United States.
- August – An attempt is made to set fire to the National Library of Abkhazia in Sukhumi during the War in Abkhazia by Georgian forces.
- August 25 – The National and University Library of Bosnia and Herzegovina is annihilated during the Siege of Sarajevo by the Army of Republika Srpska.
- September – Michael Ondaatje's historiographic metafiction The English Patient is published in Canada. It will win The Golden Man Booker in 2018.

== New books ==
=== Fiction ===
- Ben Aaronovitch – Transit
- Tariq Ali – Shadows of the Pomegranate Tree
- Paul Auster – Leviathan
- Iain Banks – The Crow Road
- Clive Barker – The Thief of Always
- Julian Barnes – The Porcupine
- Greg Bear – Anvil of Stars
- Thomas Berger – Meeting Evil
- Louis de Bernières – The Troublesome Offspring of Cardinal Guzman
- James P. Blaylock – Lord Kelvin's Machine
- Pascal Bruckner – The Divine Child
- A. S. Byatt – Morpho Eugenia
- Roger Caron – Dreamcaper
- Andrew Cartmel – Cat's Cradle: Warhead
- Patrick Chamoiseau – Texaco
- Paulo Coelho – The Valkyries
- Michael Connelly – The Black Echo
- Hugh Cook
  - The Witchlord and the Weaponmaster
  - The Worshippers and the Way
- Paul Cornell – Love and War
- Bernard Cornwell
  - Sharpe's Devil
  - Scoundrel
- Douglas Coupland – Shampoo Planet
- Mia Couto – Sleepwalking Land (Terra Sonâmbula)
- Robert Crais – Lullaby Town
- L. Sprague de Camp and Christopher Stasheff – The Enchanter Reborn
- Clarissa Pinkola Estés – Women Who Run with the Wolves
- Elena Ferrante – Troubling Love (L'amore molesto
- Tibor Fischer – Under the Frog
- Leon Forrest – Divine Days
- John Gardner – Death Is Forever
- Neil Gaiman – The Sandman: Season of Mists (graphic novel; volume 4 of The Sandman series)
- Neil Gaiman and Dave McKean – Signal to Noise (graphic novel)
- Cristina García – Dreaming in Cuban
- Mark Gatiss – Nightshade
- Ann Granger – Cold in the Earth
- Alasdair Gray – Poor Things
- John Grisham – The Pelican Brief
- Hella Haasse – Heren van de thee (The Tea Lords)
- Victor Headley – Yardie
- Andrew Hunt – Cat's Cradle: Witch Mark
- Simon Ings – Hot Head
- P. D. James – The Children of Men
- Denis Johnson – Jesus' Son (short story collection)
- John Kessel – Meeting in Infinity
- Stephen King
  - Dolores Claiborne
  - Gerald's Game
- Patrick McCabe – The Butcher Boy
- Cormac McCarthy – All the Pretty Horses (book 1 of The Border Trilogy)
- Val McDermid – Dead Beat
- Ian McEwan – Black Dogs
- Terry McMillan – Waiting to Exhale
- Javier Marías – A Heart So White (Corazón tan blanco)
- Andrés L. Mateo – La Balada de Alfonsina Bairán
- Rohinton Mistry – Tales from Firozsha Baag
- Caitlin Moran – The Chronicles of Narmo
- Toni Morrison – Jazz
- Michael Ondaatje – The English Patient
- Ellis Peters – The Holy Thief
- Marc Platt – Cat's Cradle: Time's Crucible
- Terry Pratchett
  - Lords and Ladies
  - Small Gods
- Anne Rice – The Tale of the Body Thief
- Mordecai Richler – Oh Canada! Oh Quebec!
- Jennifer Roberson – Lady of the Forest
- Robert Schneider – Schlafes Bruder
- Patricia Schonstein – A Time of Angels
- W. G. Sebald – The Emigrants (Die Ausgewanderten: Vier lange Erzählungen)
- Gail Sheehy – Silent Passage
- Sidney Sheldon – The Stars Shine Down
- Michael Slade – Cutthroat
- Danielle Steel
  - Jewels
  - Mixed Blessings
- Neal Stephenson – Snow Crash
- Adam Thorpe – Ulverton
- Sue Townsend – The Queen and I
- Rose Tremain – Sacred Country
- Barry Unsworth – Sacred Hunger
- John Updike – Memories of the Ford Administration
- Gore Vidal – Live from Golgotha: The Gospel According to Gore Vidal
- Vernor Vinge – A Fire Upon the Deep
- Robert James Waller – The Bridges of Madison County
- Connie Willis – Doomsday Book
- Timothy Zahn – Dark Force Rising
- Roger Zelazny and Thomas Thurston Thomas – Flare
- Juan Eduardo Zúñiga
  - El último día del mundo (The last day of the world)
  - Misterios de las noches y los días (Mysteries of the nights and days; short stories)

=== Children and young people ===
- Pamela Allen – Belinda
- Chris Van Allsburg – The Widow's Broom
- Gillian Cross – The Great Elephant Chase
- Garry Disher – The Bamboo Flute
- Anne Fine – Flour Babies
- Jamila Gavin – The Wheel of Surya (first in the Surya trilogy)
- Rumer Godden
  - Great Grandfather's House
  - Listen to the Nightingale
- Virginia Hamilton (with Jerry Pinkney) – Drylongso
- Gordon Korman – The Twinkie Squad
- William Mayne – Low Tide
- Gerald McDermott – Zomo The Rabbit: A Trickster Tale From West Africa
- Hilary McKay – The Exiles
- Michael Morpurgo – Waiting for Anya
- Barry Moser – Polly Vaughn: A Traditional British Ballad
- Jim Murphy – The Long Road to Gettysburg
- Barbara Park – Junie B. Jones and the Stupid Smelly Bus (first in the Junie B. Jones series)
- Marcus Pfister – The Rainbow Fish (Der Regenbogenfisch)
- Gloria Jean Pinkney (with Jerry Pinkney) – Back Home
- Marjorie W. Sharmat (with Marc Simont) – Nate the Great and the Stolen Base
- Ulf Stark – Can You Whistle, Johanna? (Kan du vissla Johanna?)
- Christopher Tolkien (with J. R. R. Tolkien and Alan Lee) – Sauron Defeated
- Judith Vigna – Black Like Kyra, White Like Me
- Martin Waddell – Owl Babies
- Nancy Willard (with Barry Moser) – Beauty and the Beast
- Douglas Wood – Old Turtle
- Susan Meddaugh – Martha Speaks

=== Drama ===
- Herb Gardner – Conversations with My Father
- Peter Handke – Die Stunde, da wir nichts voneinander wußten (The Hour We Knew Nothing of Each Other)
- David Mamet – Oleanna
- Louis Nowra – Così
- Zlatko Topčić – Musa And The Goat (radio version)
- Michael Wall – Women Laughing
- Peter Whelan – The School of Night

=== Poetry ===
- Ben Okri – An African Elegy

=== Non-fiction ===
- Nelson Algren (died 1981) – America Eats (travel book, written 1930s)
- Karen Armstrong – Muhammad: A Biography of the Prophet
- Bill Bryson – Neither Here nor There: Travels in Europe
- Linda Colley – Britons: Forging the Nation 1707–1837
- Esther Delisle – The Traitor and the Jew (Le Traître et le Juif: Lionel Groulx, le Devoir et le délire du nationalisme d'extrême droite dans la province de Québec, 1929–1939)
- Daniel Dennett – Consciousness Explained
- Joan Didion – After Henry
- Eamon Duffy – The Stripping of the Altars: Traditional Religion in England, c. 1400 to c. 1580
- Gerina Dunwich – Secrets of Love Magick
- Christiane Éluère – The Celts: First Masters of Europe
- John Gray – Men Are from Mars, Women Are from Venus
- Elizabeth Hay – The Only Snow in Havana
- Nick Hornby – Fever Pitch
- Charles Jennings – Up North
- Neil Lyndon – No More Sex War: The Failures of Feminism
- Andrew Morton – Diana: Her True Story
- Mark E. Neely Jr. – The Fate of Liberty: Abraham Lincoln and Civil Liberties
- Liza Potvin – White Lies (for My Mother)
- Léon Werth (died 1955) – 33 Jours (written 1940)
- Michael Jackson – Dancing the Dream

=== Anthologies ===
- Margaret Busby (ed.) – Daughters of Africa: An International Anthology of Words and Writings by Women of African Descent from the Ancient Egyptian to the Present

== Births ==
- April 14 – Naoise Dolan, Irish novelist
- August 12 – Naoki Higashida, Japanese autistic author
- September 18 – Jidanun Lueangpiansamut, Thai writer
- October 5 – Rupi Kaur, Indian-born Canadian poet, illustrator, photographer, and author
- October 30 – Édouard Louis, French writer
- November 11 – Aya Mansour, Iraqi poet, writer, and journalist

== Deaths ==
- January 4 – Alejandro Carrión, Ecuadorian poet and journalist (born 1915)
- January 9 – Bill Naughton, Irish-born English playwright and novelist (born 1910)
- January 4 – John Sparrow, English literary scholar (born 1906)
- January 14 – Irakli Abashidze, Georgian poet, literary scholar and politician (born 1909)
- January 28 – Dora Birtles, Australian novelist, poet and children's writer (born 1903)
- February 10 – Alex Haley, African-American writer (born 1921)
- February 16
  - Angela Carter, English novelist (lung cancer, born 1940)
  - George MacBeth, Scottish poet and novelist (motor neurone disease, born 1932)
- April 4 – Vintilă Horia, Romanian writer (born 1915)
- April 6 – Isaac Asimov, American science fiction author (born 1920)
- April 21 – Väinö Linna, Finnish novelist (born 1920)
- April 28 – Iceberg Slim (Robert Beck), American novelist (born 1918)
- May 22 – Elizabeth David, English cookery writer (born 1913)
- July 6 – Mary Q. Steele, American novelist (born 1922)
- July 22 – Reginald Bretnor, American science fiction writer (born 1911)
- July 23
  - Robert Liddell, English biographer, novelist and poet (born 1908)
  - Rosemary Sutcliff, English children's historical novelist (born 1902)
- August 4 – Seichō Matsumoto, Japanese mystery writer and journalist (born 1909)
- August 29 – Mary Norton, English children's writer (born 1903)
- September 5 – Fritz Leiber, American writer of fantasy and science fiction (born 1910)
- November 7 – Richard Yates, American novelist and short-story writer (emphysema, born 1926)
- November 17 – Audre Lorde, American poet, writer and feminist (born 1934)
- December 22 – Ted Willis, English TV dramatist (born 1914)
- December 25 – Monica Dickens, English novelist (born 1915)
- December 27 – Kay Boyle, American writer, educator and activist (born 1902)

== Awards ==
- Nobel Prize in Literature: Derek Walcott
- Camões Prize: Vergílio Ferreira

=== Australia ===
- The Australian/Vogel Literary Award: Fotini Epanomitis, The Mule's Foal
- C. J. Dennis Prize for Poetry: Robert Harris, Jane, Interlinear and Other Poems
- Kenneth Slessor Prize for Poetry: Elizabeth Riddell, Selected Poems
- Mary Gilmore Prize: Alison Croggon, This is the Stone
- Miles Franklin Award: Tim Winton, Cloudstreet

=== Canada ===
- See 1992 Governor General's Awards for a complete list of winners and finalists for those awards.
- Edna Staebler Award for Creative Non-Fiction: Marie Wadden, Nitassinan: The Innu Struggle to Reclaim Their Homeland

=== France ===
- Prix Goncourt: Patrick Chamoiseau, Texaco
- Prix Décembre: Henri Thomas, La Chasse au trésor and Roger Grenier, Regardez la neige qui tombe
- Prix Médicis French: Michel Rio, Tlacuilo
- Prix Médicis International: Louis Begley, Une éducation polonaise

=== United Kingdom ===
- Booker Prize: Michael Ondaatje, The English Patient and Barry Unsworth, Sacred Hunger
- Carnegie Medal for children's literature: Anne Fine, Flour Babies
- James Tait Black Memorial Prize for fiction: Rose Tremain, Sacred Country
- James Tait Black Memorial Prize for biography: Charles Nicholl, The Reckoning: The Murder of Christopher Marlowe
- Cholmondeley Award: Allen Curnow, Donald Davie, Carol Ann Duffy, Roger Woddis
- Eric Gregory Award: Jill Dawson, Hugh Dunkerley, Christopher Greenhalgh, Marita Maddah, Stuart Paterson, Stuart Pickford
- Queen's Gold Medal for Poetry: Kathleen Raine
- Whitbread Best Book Award: Jeff Torrington, Swing Hammer Swing!
- The Sunday Express Book of the Year: Hilary Mantel, A Place of Greater Safety
- Forward Prizes for Poetry (first awards): Thom Gunn, The Man with Night Sweats (collection); Simon Armitage, Kid (first collection); Jackie Kay, "Black Bottom" (single poem)

=== United States ===
- Agnes Lynch Starrett Poetry Prize: Hunt Hawkins, The Domestic Life
- Aiken Taylor Award for Modern American Poetry: Gwendolyn Brooks
- American Academy of Arts and Letters Gold Medal for Drama: Sam Shepard
- Bobbitt National Prize for Poetry: Louise Glück for Ararat, and Mark Strand for The Continuous Life
- Compton Crook Award: Carol Severance, Reefsong
- Frost Medal: Adrienne Rich / David Ignatow
- National Book Award for Fiction: to All the Pretty Horses by Cormac McCarthy
- National Book Critics Circle Award: to Young Men and Fire by Norman Maclean
- Nebula Award: Connie Willis, Doomsday Book
- Newbery Medal for children's literature: Phyllis Reynolds Naylor, Shiloh
- PEN/Faulkner Award for Fiction: to Mao II by Don DeLillo
- Pulitzer Prize for Fiction: Jane Smiley, A Thousand Acres
- Pulitzer Prize for Poetry: James Tate, Selected Poems
- Pulitzer Prize for Drama: Robert Schenkkan, The Kentucky Cycle
- Whiting Awards:

Fiction: R.S. Jones, J. S. Marcus, Damien Wilkins
Nonfiction: Eva Hoffman, Katha Pollitt (poetry/nonfiction)
Plays: Suzan-Lori Parks, Keith Reddin, José Rivera
Poetry: Roger Fanning, Jane Mead

=== Elsewhere ===
- Friedenspreis des Deutschen Buchhandels: Amos Oz
- Premio Nadal: Alejandro Gándara, Ciegas esperanzas
