= Martha Speaks =

Martha Speaks may refer to:

- Martha Speaks (book), a 1992 children's book and subsequent 1990s children's book series
- Martha Speaks (TV series), a 2008 children's animated educational TV show based on the book series
