= List of Martha Speaks episodes =

List of episodes

This is the list of episodes for the animated television series Martha Speaks. The series aired on PBS Kids from September 1, 2008 to November 18, 2014. Each episode focuses on mainly synonyms and vocabulary, featuring an underlying theme illustrated with a wide range of keywords, but can occasionally focus on introducing children to different science and other learning concepts, such as the Spanish language through passing mentions, history, and astronomy.

== Series overview ==
Season	Segments	Episodes	Originally released	
Season	Segments	Episodes	First released	Last released
1	78	40	September 1, 2008	July 17, 2009
2	27	15 (Note: The second half of the season was split into a third season, bringing the number of episodes to 15.)	September 14, 2009	May 14, 2010
3	29	15	October 11, 2010	October 3, 2011
4	18	10	February 20, 2012	April 5, 2013
5	16	8	June 24, 2013	November 14, 2013
6	16	8	March 31, 2014	November 18, 2014

== Episodes ==
=== Season 1 (2008–09) ===
No. overall	No. in season	Title	Vocabulary words	Original release date
1a	1a	"Martha Speaks"	express, discuss, mumble, exclaim, shout, speak, jabber, talk, whisper, communicate	September 1, 2008
When Helen feeds Martha alphabet soup, the letters somehow go to Martha's brain as she develops her ability to talk.
1b	1b	"Martha Gives Advice"	persuade, defend, encourage, groan, advice, disagree, agree, suggest, offer, plead, sigh, opinion	September 1, 2008
Helen tries to take Carolina's advice. Meanwhile, Martha becomes the new host of a radio advice show.
2a	2a	"Martha and Skits"	exceptional, stupendous, unique, specialize, extraordinary, one of a kind, excellent, perfect, super	September 2, 2008
The family gets a new puppy named Skits.
2b	2b	"Martha Plays a Part"	talent, expert, knack, gift, outstanding, superb, terrific, fantastic, practice, perform, cue, play	September 2, 2008
Helen is miserable after Martha volunteers her for a part in the school play.
3a	3a	"Martha Takes the Cake"	innocent, guilty, biased, witness, evidence, judge, jury, trial, prove, true, truth	September 3, 2008
Ronald thinks Martha is responsible for ruining Alice's birthday cake, so Martha proclaims her innocence.
3b	3b	"Codename: Martha"	suspicious, accomplice, plotting, proof, expression, fishy, partner, planning, positive	September 3, 2008
Martha, Helen, and T.D. uncover a plot to rob the local jewelry store.
4a	4a	"Martha to the Rescue"	rescue, courageous, danger, protect, hero, save, strong, harm, escape, trouble	September 4, 2008
Martha is inspired by her favorite show, "Courageous Collie Carlo."
4b	4b	"Martha Camps Out"	honorary, brave, earn, merit badge, frightened, helpful, guard, scared, afraid	September 4, 2008
When Helen and Alice plan to go camping, Ronald tries to warn them about Big Minnie.
5a	5a	"Down on the Farm"	chores, herd, pasture, responsibility, task, toil, job, tired, rise	September 5, 2008
Martha volunteers to help with chores while she visits T.D.'s grandpa CK's farm.
5b	5b	"Martha Runs Away"	success, appreciate, opportunity, promote, employ, manage, hire, work, boss trouble	September 5, 2008
When Helen blames Martha for a mess Skits made, Martha feels unappreciated and decides to run away.
6a	6a	"Martha Blah Blah"	limit, add, subtract, reduce, diminish, few, greater, higher, more, less	September 8, 2008
Granny Flo decides to cut costs at the soup factory.
6b	6b	"Skits Behaves"	improve, progress, expand, behave, develop, better, misbehave, grow, manners, learn	September 8, 2008
Skits' rambunctious behavior has gotten out of hand.
7a	7a	"Martha and the Canine Caper"	distressed, blame, confess, conceal, shame, rob, crime, punish, suspect, honest, hurt	September 9, 2008
Martha inadvertently helps some stray dogs rob Karl the butcher.
7b	7b	"Perfectly Martha"	train, imperfect, obedient, disobedient, misbehave, wild, good, bad, sneaky, secret	September 9, 2008
Martha thinks there is something bad about the Perfect Pup Institute.
8a	8a	"Firedog Martha"	reality, fantasy, fiction, imagine, tale, dispatcher, story, real, fact, pretend, actually	September 10, 2008
Martha wants to be a Firedog Freddie, just like her favorite book.
8b	8b	"Martha's Pickle"	bizarre, odd, normal, farfetched, rumor, unusual, weird, wacky, ordinary, strange, report	September 10, 2008
Everyone must figure out how to defeat the aliens, before turning into pickles.
9a	9a	"The Dog Who Came to Dinner"	jealous, visitor, privileges, envy, demanding, houseguest, welcome, rude, polite, manners	September 11, 2008
Helen agrees to take care of Mrs. Clusky's dog while Martha cannot wait to welcome their houseguest.
9b	9b	"Martha Calling"	allow, forbid, permit, restrict, problem, guest, rules, invite, vacation	September 11, 2008
Martha wins a trip to the Come–On–Inn from a radio call–in show.
10a	10a	"Oh, Nooo!"	deceive, honest, dishonest, mislead, popular, trust, believe, fooling, right, wrong, advertise	September 12, 2008
Granny Flo's Alphabet Soup is taking a licking from the competition, Oodles of Os.
10b	10b	"Bye Martha"	deny, admit, claim, false, translate, switch, mistake, trick, fraud	September 12, 2008
Nefarious con artist Weaselgraft plans to kidnap Martha.
11a	11a	"Martha Walks the Dog"	annoy, beware, insult, pleasant, unpleasant, bully, mean, loud, tough, naughty	September 15, 2008
When a new mean dog comes to town, Helen and Martha have to keep the dog calm.
11b	11b	"Martha's Got Talent"	coax, compliment, flatter, tempt, praise, tongue twister, care, friendly, practice, treat	September 15, 2008
Weaselgraft invites Martha to a talent show.
12a	12a	"Martha the Hero Maker"	thrilling, hero, villain, astonish, humongous, boring, exciting, adventure, incredible, amazing, dull	September 16, 2008
Truman, T.D., and Helen help Martha write a story.
12b	12b	"Starstruck Martha"	ecstatic, embarrass, enthusiastic, eager, reputation, fear, excited, glad, upset, fan	September 16, 2008
Martha is convinced when she hears Courageous Collie Carlo.
13a	13a	"Martha in Charge"	remedy, recover, recuperate, cure, medicine, hoarse, rest, well, sick	September 17, 2008
When Helen ends up with laryngitis, Martha tries to take care of the patient.
13b	13b	"Truman and the Deep Blue Sea"	dread, nauseous, overcome, persevere, seasick, ill, quit, queasy, sick, shaky	September 17, 2008
Alice invites the gang to go whale watching, but Truman realizes that he will end up getting seasick.
14a	14a	"Escape from Flea Island"	cooperate, consensus, government, law, supervise, agree, lead, in charge, rule, team	September 18, 2008
When Carolina outdoes Tiffany on the science project, she organizes an expedition with TD, Truman, and Martha to gather "exotic" plants. Note: Helen is absent in this episode.
14b	14b	"No Dogs Allowed"	campaign, debate, elect, influence, issue, choose, decide, lose, vote, win, club	September 18, 2008
When Tiffany wants to make Helen's treehouse into a girls' clubhouse, the girls hold an election.
15	15	"Ain't Nothin' But a Pound Dog"	abandon, deserted, neglected, overlooked, fortunate, alone, forgot, harsh, lonely, tough, rough, adopt, affection, devoted, embrace, loyal, adore, belong, care, dream, hope	September 19, 2008
Part 1: Martha loses her collar and ends up in the animal shelter. Part 2: When Martha's family comes to rescue her, she cannot leave her shelter friends behind. Martha, Helen, and TD help each other to find families for the pound pooches.
16a	16a	"Raiders of the Lost Art"	apologize, dilemma, forgive, miserable, regret, mistake, solve, sorry, swap, unhappy	October 13, 2008
When TD accidentally passes in the wrong drawing in art class, he and Helen must switch the drawings.
16b	16b	"Martha Says it with Flowers"	considerate, delightful, thoughtful, sincere, inconsiderate, kind, lovely, nice, sweet	October 13, 2008
Martha plans to give a special gift for Grandma's birthday.
17a	17a	"Martha Doesn't Speak Monkey!"	directions, retrieves, instructions, follow, lead, inside, behind, under, on top, in front, find	October 14, 2008
Martha must help Professor Monkey find the bookstore before Beppo turns in her banana suit.
17b	17b	"Martha and Truman Get Lost"	track, trail, misplace, locate, search, lost, found, missing, near, far, around	October 14, 2008
Truman needs Martha to help him find what he lost at Dog Head Lake.
18a	18a	"Martha Gets Spooked"	eerie, explain, gullible, logical, impossible, creepy, ghost, haunted, unlikely, spook	October 31, 2008
Martha has to go to the haunted house to protect Helen.
18b	18b	"Martha Changes Her Luck"	jinx, superstitious, curse, coincidence, reason, luck, chance, accident, fluke, doomed	October 31, 2008
When Martha has bad luck, Helen tries to explain that all the accidents are just coincidence.
19	19	"Martha Runs the Store"	escape, entrance, flee, stuck, trapped, hurry, closed, inside, open, outside, avoid, capture, distract, exit, intruder, catch, door, get away, guard, hide	November 26, 2008
Part 1: Skits and Martha are feeling desperate while they are waiting for Helen. Part 2: Martha and Skits end up getting locked inside at the department store.
20a	20a	"Best in Show"	competition, contest, champion, rival, victory, beat, enter, lose, prize, win	November 28, 2008
When Carolina decides to enter her dog François in the dog show, Helen has to enter Martha too.
20b	20b	"Truman on the Ball"	achievement, attempt, concentrate, effort, patient, throw, catch, toss, lesson	November 28, 2008
Truman has trouble catching the ball before a softball game.
21a	21a	"Martha Sings"	instrument, musician, vocalist, recording, tempo, melody, sing, song, music, hear, sound	March 2, 2009
When Martha wakes up singing, Helen takes her to the vet.
21b	21b	"T.D. Makes the Band"	lyrics, audience, rhythm, inspiration, encore, band, beat, hit, concert, catchy	March 2, 2009
When TD wants to write a better song, he recruits the gang to join his band to write a hit song.
22a	22a	"Itchy Martha"	device, contraption, devise, invent, variation, helmet, gadget, machine, idea, cone	February 13, 2009
Martha has to wear a cone on her head to keep her away from scratching.
22b	22b	"Martha and the Thief of Hearts"	craft, personalized, design, exquisite, original, draw, create, supplies, materials, decorate	February 13, 2009
The gang decides to make homemade valentines for each other until their affectionate mood disappears.
23a	23a	"Alice Twinkle Toes"	awkward, balance, clumsy, graceful, coordinated, athlete, dancer, klutz, stumble, beautiful	February 16, 2009
Alice sees a performance of the ballet so that way she could take ballet lessons.
23b	23b	"Martha Fails the Course"	agility, flexible, nimble, challenge, course, speed, smooth, quick, move, fall	February 16, 2009
When Martha sees a dog agility course on TV, her dream becomes a nightmare.
24a	24a	"There Goes the Neighborhood"	discriminate, prejudice, territory, tolerate, socialize, sociable, buddy, pal, greet, ignore	February 17, 2009
The gang knows kittens are not to be tolerated.
24b	24b	"Ice Scream"	aversion, disgust, peer pressure, prefer, narrow–minded, against, choice, dislike, flavor, like	February 17, 2009
Alice is shocked to discover that Truman has never eaten ice cream.
25a	25a	"Nurse Martha"	examine, observe, research, symptom, vaccine, test, treat, checkup, veterinarian, healthy	February 18, 2009
Martha gets a job as the vet's assistant but she must need her linguistic skills.
25b	25b	"T.D. Gets the Scoop"	inspect, information, investigate, scoop, uncover, news, story, headline, cover, print	February 18, 2009
Carolina is writing a newspaper and she needs to enlist the gang to track down the news.
26a	26a	"Skits Under the Weather"	storm, thunder, lightning, shower, precipitation, hail, wet, downpour, rainfall, drizzle	March 16, 2009
Skits tries to outrun the storm, but he soon discovers that all roads somehow lead back home.
26b	26b	"Martha the Weather Dog"	forecast, temperature, meteorologist, predict, weather, sunny, shower, snow, rain, cloudy, lightning	March 16, 2009
Martha wants to be a weather dog and is thrilled that she will be able to change the weather.
27a	27a	"Martha in the Doghouse"	architect, blueprint, construction, shelter, model, build, building, tools, sketch, porch	March 17, 2009
Helen and the gang team up to design a doghouse for Martha.
27b	27b	"Martha Models"	apparel, measurement, outfit, pattern, style, sew, fit, hem, model, fashion	March 17, 2009
Carolina and Helen design outfits for Martha and Skits for a parade.
28a	28a	"T.D. and Martha Gopher Broke"	agriculture, burrow, crop, pest, produce, farm, gnaw, plants, trap, underground	March 18, 2009
Martha spends the weekend at CK's farm with TD and TD's dad, to keep a gopher away from the crops.
28b	28b	"T.D. and the Steak Tree"	bloom, blossom, harvest, sprout, trend, branch, bud, grow, plant, pick	March 18, 2009
TD gets shocked when Weaselgraft and Pablum buy a steak tree.
29a	29a	"Virtually Martha"	deleted, attach, email, folder, file, computer, send, desktop, laptop, icon	March 19, 2009
Martha accidentally gets zapped inside Alice's laptop.
29b	29b	"Martha vs. Robot"	command, function, manual, mechanical, program, robot, charge, fetch, alive, button	March 19, 2009
Alice's family gets a robotic pet called Dynamo.
30a	30a	"Helen's All Thumbs"	addict, obsessed, preoccupied, monitor, restraint, hooked, quit, level, rid, break	March 20, 2009
When Helen becomes addicted to a video game, she becomes completely preoccupied.
30b	30b	"Martha's Dirty Habit"	habit, weakness, urge, crave, drive, want, stop, desire, need, irresistible	March 20, 2009
Martha's habit gets her in trouble and the family decides they need to put her desire to dig to good use.
31a	31a	"Martha Bakes"	recipe, ingredients, from scratch, blend, beat, mix, pour, bake, oven, stir	April 6, 2009
When Helen loses the art competition, her mom decides to bake her a cake to cheer her up but Martha and Skits decide to take over.
31b	31b	"Martha Makes Scents"	combine, concoct, dissolve, separate, extract, spritz, drop, spray, fragrance, perfume, strong	April 6, 2009
Martha thinks TD's dad should invent a perfume.
32a	32a	"Martha the Witness"	accuse, testify, defendant, plaintiff, mistrial, objection, describe, answer, question, explain, accident	April 7, 2009
Martha witnesses an accident that destroyed Mrs. Demson's lawn furniture, so Mrs. Demson must get Martha to appear as her witness in court.
32b	32b	"Martha Takes a Stand"	right, compromise, principle, resolve, option, fair, unfair, give in, freedom, civilized, demand	April 7, 2009
Martha smells bad and she makes a stand.
33a	33a	"Martha Goes to School"	attendance, substitute, attention, behavior, report, teacher, lesson, student, school, homework	April 8, 2009
Martha gets a job as a substitute teacher for Helen's class.
33b	33b	"T.D. and the Light Bulb of Doom"	assignment, inventor, discover, biography, subject, chapter, study, project, class, grade	April 8, 2009
TD has to do a report as he watches the "Harry Blotter, Boy Wizard".
34a	34a	"Martha Treads the Boards"	tradition, custom, culture, generation, annual, family, different, community, theater, marry	April 9, 2009
During a theater production, Helen's parents get trapped in their dressing room.
34b	34b	"Martha's Pack"	family tree, ancestors, descendant, pack, relatives, wolf, sister, brother, cousin, daughter	April 9, 2009
When Helen leaves Martha off her family tree, Martha decides to make her own pack.
35a	35a	"Martha Smells"	aroma, fragrance, scent, stench, reek, smell, stink, whiff, odor	April 10, 2009
Martha is secretly trapped inside Pablum and Weaselgraft's hideout, so Helen and TD follow her scent map and uncover it.
35b	35b	"Martha Hears"	blaring, clanging, creak, rumble, audio, noise, listen, siren, bell, ears	April 10, 2009
Martha is still trapped in Weaselgraft and Pablum's lair as she leads Helen and TD to their hideout by describing what she hears.
36a	36a	"Martha's Worst Best Day"	exactly, correct, offend, reverse, contrary, opposite, meant, top, backwards, bottom	July 13, 2009
Martha is offended while Truman figures out that she is saying the exact reverse.
36b	36b	"Truman's Brother"	sibling, common, similar, contrast, identical, together, alike, twins, both, only	July 13, 2009
Helen and Alice bet Truman and TD that they cannot keep the brother thing up because they do not exactly have a lot in common.
37a	37a	"Here's Martha!"	interview, conversation, understand, interpret, comprehend, chat, thoughts, think, mind, know	July 14, 2009
Martha hosts a TV show to understand what animals are saying.
37b	37b	"Dog Fight"	quarrel, bicker, negotiate, barter, truce, selfish, fight, share, take a turn, trade	July 14, 2009
Martha and Skits do not want to share their new dog toy.
38a	38a	"Therapy Dog"	therapy, patient, cheer, relief, treatment, hospital, rash, pain, doctor, nurse	July 15, 2009
Martha becomes a hospital therapy dog, spreading cheer among the patients.
38b	38b	"Martha's Duck Trouble"	mend, heal, fake, mood, spirits, feel, worse, glum, down, low	July 15, 2009
Ralph has settled in at Martha's house but it feels like he is taking over.
39a	39a	"Truman's Secret"	appearance, self–conscious, mortified, flaw, vain, picture, horrible, barber, photo, haircut	July 16, 2009
Truman is hiding in the garage but he is afraid to reveal his secret.
39b	39b	"Skits Monkeys Around"	phase, temporary, outgrow, imitate, mature, copy, same, babyish, younger	July 16, 2009
Skits loves to watch Malcolm (the blue monkey on TV) and he wants to be him.
40a	40a	"What's Bothering Bob?"	anxious, serene, provoke, disturb, bother, calm, settle down, relax, awful, quiet	July 17, 2009
Bob gets off his chain and chases Truman all over town.
40b	40b	"Martha Spins a Tale"	irritating, soothing, comfortable, cozy, sweltering, scratchy, cool, lumpy, bumpy, hot	July 17, 2009
Martha tells Jake a story about Goldi–Martha, Skits Hatter, and Little Red Riding Helen.

=== Season 2 (2009–10) ===
A total of 30 episodes (60 segments) were produced for season 2, with 15 episodes making up season 2 in terms of broadcast order.

No. overall	No. in season	Title	Vocabulary words	Original release date
41a	1a	"Martha's Chair"	antique, donate, upholstery, profit, valuable, furniture, worth, worthless, rich, cost, clean	September 14, 2009
Martha's family gives Martha a new dog bed for her birthday.
41b	1b	"T.D. the Pack Rat"	worthless, rubbish, clutter, salvage, priceless, perspective, garbage, junk, collect, keep, sell	September 14, 2009
When T.D. has too much junk, T.D.'s mom suggests he can keep everything he has.
42a	2a	"Painting for Peanuts"	realistic, easel, participate, abstract, portrait, painting, artwork, brushes, course, sculpture, pose	September 15, 2009
Helen and T.D. volunteer for an animal painting class to try and save it.
42b	2b	"Martha's No Dummy"	pantomime, routine, rehearse, ventriloquist, entertain, host, show, old-fashioned, star, act	September 15, 2009
Granny Flo is hosting a variety show.
43	3	"Martha Puts Out the Lights"	petition, illegal, cause, picket, goal, ban, protest, sign, ask, on strike, purpose, signature, unite, majority, prohibit, fireworks, summer, write, support	September 16, 2009
Part 1: Mrs. Demson tries to get people to sign a petition to ban fireworks. Part 2: Helen and her friends are devastated about the fireworks ban as Martha realizes that she helped Mrs. Demson ruin their fun.
44a	4a	"The Penguin Always Rings Twice"	mystery, clue, culprit, hunch, motive, first, second, next, last, after	September 17, 2009
Martha and Skits are determined to prove Jeffy's innocence.
44b	4b	"The Martha Code"	code, decipher, message, gibberish, arbitrary, break, unbreakable, crack, secret, key, figure out	September 17, 2009
After Martha accidentally eats a secret code, she is lost and leaves Helen coded phone messages.
45a	5a	"Martha in the Hold"	cargo, passenger, turbulence, taxi, arrive, depart, travel, suitcase, flight, trip, take off	September 18, 2009
Martha does not want to be left behind when the family goes on vacation to Montana.
45b	5b	"Get Along, Little Dogies!"	vacation, stampede, lodging, sightseeing, cattle drive, scenery, wagon, cowboy, camp, outdoors, tour	September 18, 2009
Martha is excited to go on a cattle drive.
46	6	"Martha in the White House"	neighborhood, national, volunteer, recommend, community, nominate, president, white house, leader, country, mission, function, appoint, advise, representative, cabinet, aide, serve, official, secretary	February 15, 2010
Part 1: Martha becomes the new president of the White House. Part 2: One of the president's aides heard about Martha's speaking ability and he needs her to report to the White House.
47a	7a	"The Jakey Express"	schedule, delivery, funicular, delay, transportation. flag down, lift, early, late, traffic, on time	February 16, 2010
While being stuck in traffic, Helen's father tells the story of the day Jake was born.
47b	7b	"Martha, Sled Dog"	serum, sled, vehicle, transform, accelerate, glide, hitch, steer, haul, brake	February 16, 2010
Truman tells Martha the story of Balto, the heroic Alaskan sled dog.
48a	8a	"Paws and Effect"	discard, litter, thoughtless, debris, recycle, careless, trash, important, broke, injured	February 17, 2010
When Martha gets a piece of glass in her paw, everyone realizes that littering hurts more than the environment.
48b	8b	"The Trouble with Teddy"	hazardous, ingest, environment, poisonous, pesticide, rotten, spoil, safe, dangerous, gross	February 17, 2010
A dog named Teddy is sick and Martha is called in to consult, even she cannot diagnose the patient.
49a	9a	"¿Qué Pasa, Martha?"	pronounce, bilingual, recite, memorize	February 18, 2010
Alice is nervous about doing an oral report in Spanish.
49b	9b	"T.D. Is Talking Dog"	enunciate, language, linguist, vocabulary	February 18, 2010
Inspired by an old Tarzan-style movie, T.D. decides to learn animal languages and become an animal linguist.
50a	10a	"Dogs in Space"	Solar System, orbit, planet, star	February 19, 2010
Mrs. Clusky asks the class to present projects on the Solar System, but T.D. finds himself distracted by comic books.
50b	10b	"Dogs from Space"	universe, humane, invasion, extraterrestrial, astronomy, astronaut, asteroid, alien, world, creature	February 19, 2010
Inspired by T.D.'s comic about the "Planet of the Dogs", Martha has a dream as an alien space dog.
51a	11a	"Skits on Ice"	risky, thaw, solid, freeze, frozen, defrost, ice, cold, melt, puck, hockey, thin	April 12, 2010
Helen tells the story of how puppy Skits chased a puck onto thin ice, and how quick thinking by Martha saved the day.
51b	11b	"Martha's Steamed!"	emergency, scorching, parched, sizzling, broiling, panting, sweat, heat, thirsty, page	April 12, 2010
Helen and Martha discover a dog locked in a car during a hot day.
52	12	"Martha's Life in Crime"	autobiography, possible, yearn, promise, narrate, flashback, tell, back then, now, recall, before, reminiscing, background, aspire, sequence, time, past, wish, happened, when	May 10, 2010
Part 1: Martha tells the story of her puppy days in the animal shelter and her excitement of finding a family. Part 2: Martha's new owner turns out to have unsavory plans for her.
53a	13a	"Martha Plays Favorites"	include, exclude, notice, snub, replace, favorite, special, touchy, cute, cuddly	May 11, 2010
Truman is worried that his mom has been busy taking care of the babies at her daycare.
53b	13b	"Martha and the Doggie Lover"	sensitive, aggressive, delicate, aggravate, out of control, shy, gentle, choke, careful, tame	May 11, 2010
Martha teaches C.D. how to take care of dogs.
54a	14a	"Martha and the One Thousand Fleas"	charity, contribute, fundraiser, salesman, benefit, funds, grand finale, money, owe, raise	May 13, 2010
Helen is shocked to find that the cookies she was supposed to sell for the school fundraiser was eaten.
54b	14b	"Nice and Crabby"	complain, disposition, cruel, personality, amiable, grumpy, crabby, lovable, cranky, cheerful	May 13, 2010
When Mrs. Demson is suddenly nice, Martha sets out to get to the bottom of the mystery.
55	15	"Martha: Secret Agent Dog"	secret agent, service, formula, surveillance, defeat, safe, steal, spy, chief, warn, trespass, self-destruct, invisible, scheme, mastermind, disguise, combination, crook, hideout	May 14, 2010
Part 1: Martha is on a super secret mission to find out who is trying to steal the formula for Granny's soup. Part 2: Martha uses disguises and gadgets to hound the evil soup thieves.

=== Season 3 (2010–11) ===
This season is actually the second half of season 2 in terms of production order.

No. overall	No. in season	Title	Vocabulary words	Original release date
56	1	"The Martha Show"	genre, drama, educational, merchandise, style, comedy, co-star, medical, program, watch, script, pilot, imaginative, suspense, depict, duo, viewers, children, pirate, whale	October 11, 2010
Martha becomes a host on "The Martha Show".
57a	2a	"Martha's Millions"	inherit, wealthy, greedy, generous, fortune, will, buy, spend, stingy, give	October 12, 2010
Carolina reads about a dog inheriting millions.
57b	2b	"Carolina's Gifted"	gift certificate, expire, purchase, splurge, redeem, squirrel away, save, cash, pay/paid, pick	October 12, 2010
Carolina has not used her gift certificate from last year's birthday, so she and Helen try to get the perfect gift before her birthday.
58a	3a	"Truman's Mad"	explore, theory, analyze, outcome, effect, note, lab, kit, finding, magnet	October 13, 2010
When Truman sends away for a science kit, he dreams about all the new inventions he will create.
58b	3b	"Dog for a Day"	hypothesis, experiment, conclusion, compare, result, human, canine, science, easy, hard	October 13, 2010
When TD and Martha decide to switch roles for a day, they discover that life can be surprisingly tough.
59a	4a	"Martha: Deadline Doggie"	article, deadline, eavesdrop, gossip, private, type, read, tip, paper, surprise	October 14, 2010
Martha begins to sniff out leads for Carolina's paper but the news is not fit to print.
59b	4b	"It's the Giant Pumpkin, Martha"	fabricate, source, exaggerate, reliable, anonymous, retract, reporter, lie, record, ton, pounds	October 14, 2010
With The Ronald Report as her new competition, Carolina needs stories, big stories, to keep her paper afloat.
60a	5a	"The Dog Did It"	primitive, civilization, prehistoric, ancient, philosopher, origin, stone, fire, caveman, history	October 15, 2010
Martha shares the Great Oral History of Dogs with Helen, TD, and Truman.
60b	5b	"Martha Out West"	pioneer, frontier, founded, outlaw, property, western, mayor, sheriff, town, settle	October 15, 2010
The gang has borrowed a video camera from the library so they can film their very own Wild West production.
61a	6a	"T.D.'s Magic"	feat, rational, vanish, illusion, dubious, disappear, magic, appear, explanation, powers	October 25, 2010
TD has found the best birthday gift of all time for his cousin CD: He is going to put on a magic show at his party.
61b	6b	"Scaredy Cat"	silhouette, unexpected, nightmare, phantom, ominous, scare, dark, windy, rainy, night	October 25, 2010
Everyone heads to Boxwood's house during a storm.
62a	7a	"The Opera Contest"	opera, soprano, bass, quartet, accomplish, scene, rhyme, costume, stage, prop(s)	February 21, 2011
The kids have come up with their own ideas of what an opera should be.
62b	7b	"Maestro Martha"	orchestra, symphony, conduct(or)(ing), percussion, composition, trumpet, string, maestro, gong, usher	February 21, 2011
Pablum and Weaselgraft have a plan to freeze people at a charity concert.
63a	8a	"Skits and Mr. Scruffles"	occupied, companion, lonesome, disappoint, imaginary, bored, lonely, twice, play(ed)(ing), fun	February 22, 2011
Skits meets Milo, a lonesome newcomer who just moved to Wagstaff City.
63b	8b	"Brave Truman"	panic, reaction, terrify(ed)(ing), phobia, reassur(e)(ing), height(s), worr(y)(ied), dizzy, steep, tall	February 22, 2011
Truman is afraid to try out his new sled but his friends are convinced that Truman is braver than he seems.
64a	9a	"Martha Acts Up"	character(s), motivat(e)(ation), portray(s), psychology, instinct(ual), part, actors, play, line(s), show	February 23, 2011
Martha is excited when she becomes a star of "Alice in Wonderland"
64b	9b	"Ronald Is In"	attitude, diagnose(is)(ed)(ing), emulate(ing), mimic(ing), mental, borrow, worried, used book(s), yogurt	February 23, 2011
When Ronald finds a book on psychology, he becomes the expert on everyone's "problems."
65a	10a	"Patrol Dog Martha"	patrol, citation, smuggle, secur(e)(ity), officer, police, freeze, beat, cop	February 24, 2011
Martha wishes she can be a police dog like Rascal.
65b	10b	"The Crooning Crook Caper"	paper, detective, camouflage, pursu(e)(it), stakeout, footprint, monocle, criminal, notebook, handwriting	February 24, 2011
Helen wishes she could be a kid detective just like her favorite book character, Curious Crystal.
66a	11a	"Myth Me?"	myth, legend, moral, reflection, fate, point, ending, setting, over, Greek	February 25, 2011
The gang acts out Greek myths during a rainy day.
66b	11b	"TD's Myth Take"	version, alter, revis(e)(ing), adaptation, dramatize, change, fix, perfect, plot, nymph	February 25, 2011
TD is not satisfied with any Greek myth, so he decides to write his own version.
67a	12a	"Wagstaff Races"	energy, solar, alternative, convert, generate, cart, (re)use, green, power, parts	April 22, 2011
Wagstaff City's environmental club is having a "Go Green Go-Cart Race," fueled by renewable energy.
67b	12b	"The Missing Metal Mystery"	waste, pollut(e)(ing)(tion), landfill, biodegradable, aluminum, copper, metal(s), trophy, sleepwalking	April 22, 2011
When Detective TD announces the identity of his main suspect, everyone is shocked.
68a	13a	"Martha's Slumber Party of the Weird"	science fiction, data, unpredictable, foresee(able), unforeseen, feline(s), gather(ing), mysterious, peculiar, vine	June 27, 2011
As the gang is camping out, TD suggests they tell science fiction stories.
68b	13b	"Return to Martha's Slumber Party of the Weird"	miniature(ize), enormous, magnify(ing), improbable, scientist, ray, puny, huge, giant, mini	June 27, 2011
A shadow on the outside of the tent inspires still more stories.
69a	14a	"The Long, Rotten Summer"	moment(s), endless, infinite, eternal, interrupt, minute, hour, day, tomorrow, never, forever	July 1, 2011
TD wants to spend his summer at school.
69b	14b	"The Case of the Shattered Vase"	instant, perception, transpire(d), occur(ed), review(ing), crash, touch(ing), second, events, vase	July 1, 2011
Helen has a nightmare from a horror movie she watched.
70a	15a	"Alice Covers Up"	(self)confiden(t)(ce), complexion, timid, outgoing, bashful, color, sort, brand, fair/fair-skinned, dye	October 3, 2011
During a pool party, Alice is shocked while dying her skin orange.
70b	15b	"Carolina Picks a Lily"	shallow, temperament, vicious, impulsive, foster, hypoallergenic, sweet, type, breed, kind, nasty	October 3, 2011
Carolina adopts a new puppy named Lily.

=== Season 4 (2012–13) ===
The fourth season began with "Cora! Cora! Cora!" and "Cora Encore!", both of which guest star Jon Hamm and Jennifer Westfeldt, and concluded with "Martha's Market" and "Bye Bye, Burger Boy". This was the first season to feature guest stars, with others including Jennifer Garner ("Too Many Marthas"), poet laureate Billy Collins ("Billy Collins Speaks"), and astrophysicist Neil deGrasse Tyson ("Eyes on the Skies"). This season is actually season 3 in terms of production order.

This season marks a change in the cast, as Christina Crivici has left her role as Alice Boxwood, with Michelle Creber stepping in to take her place. Additionally, Alex Ferris, Madeleine Peters, and Cedric Payne, who lend their voices to T.D. Kennelly, Milo Lee, Helen Lorraine, and Truman Oatley, have all shown significant vocal growth, yet they remain committed to their characters.

No. overall	No. in season	Title	Vocabulary words	Original release date
71a	1a	"Cora! Cora! Cora!"	admire, reunite, ambition, famous, audition	February 20, 2012
When Helen's family friend Kit Luntayne is upset, she had to leave her lovable dog, Cora, at home while she travels with her acting troupe.
71b	1b	"Cora Encore!"	stash, bold, chaos, actor/actress, understudy	February 20, 2012
Confusion ensues as Martha and Ham cross paths with a troupe of circus dogs who all look exactly like Cora.
72a	2a	"Billy Collins Speaks"	poem, poet, prose, imposter, metaphor(ically)	April 2, 2012
Billy Collins writes great poems about dogs.
72b	2b	"Milo's Reading Buddy"	fluent, struggle, apprehensive, interject, nervous	April 2, 2012
While Milo reads, T.D. helps him find a Reading Buddy.
73a	3a	"Verb Dog, When Action Calls!"	verb, ambulate, elevate, descend, (un)petrify	April 3, 2012
Martha becomes Verb Dog. Using her unique superpower to control people with verbs, Martha defends the town from evil.
73b	3b	"Martha's Adverb Adventure"	sloppily, instantly, immediately, completely, adverb	April 3, 2012
Weaselgraft and Pablum have a new invention, The Adverbalizer activates adverbs.
74	4	"Return of the Bookbots: The Case of the Missing Words"	noun, remove, term, insert, announce(r), oath, adjective, define, modify, weightless	April 4, 2012
Part 1: The Bookbots are faced with a new nemesis: The Announcer. Armed with the power to bring nouns from books to life, the Announcer is wreaking havoc on Wagstaff City. Part 2: The Bookbots have discovered a secret weapon: adjectives. Equipped with this new linguistic leverage, our heroes may just be able to save their beloved city from their phonological foe.
75a	5a	"Eyes on the Skies"	telescope, seminar, identify, curious, astrophysicist, presentation	June 15, 2012
Astrophysicist Neil deGrasse Tyson, is holding a seminar at the library.
75b	5b	"Camp Truman"	activity, hike, forage, nature, grueling.	June 15, 2012
Milo is excited to go to Camp Winnetka this summer but Truman discovers that Camp Winnetka is closing.
76a	6a	"Monkeyshines Martha"	relieve, genius, unwind, cherish, pressure	July 23, 2012
When Helen's hefty schoolwork load leaves her, Martha finds a friend in Professor Monkey.
76b	6b	"Dog Daze"	empathy, sympathy, mannerisms, characteristics, point of view	July 23, 2012
When Carolina gets sick, she ends up waking up as a dog.
77	7	"Martha's Thanksgiving"	reunion, torcher, prepare, organize, trace, quest, assemble, connect, memory, recognize, arrange	November 19, 2012
When Martha learns that Helen's extended family will be coming for Thanksgiving, she decides to search for her own long-lost canine siblings.
78a	8a	"Bulldozer Versus Dinosaur!"	match, force, equal, contend(er), clash	February 1, 2013
TD uses a time machine to bring a dinosaur back from the late Cretaceous period.
78b	8b	"Carolina Tackles Football"	pass, tackle, fumble, huddle, intercept(ion)	February 1, 2013
The gang is shocked to discover a fanatical coach.
79a	9a	"Too Many Marthas"	number, diva, solo, aria, a capella	February 4, 2013
When Martha is asked to sing at an animal rescue fundraiser, she gets mixed up with another dog.
79b	9b	"Too Much Martha"	weight, portion, restrict, nutrition, balanced diet	February 4, 2013
Martha's vet says that Martha needs to lose some weight, so the family resolves to help Martha to maintain a balanced diet.
80a	10a	"Martha's Market"	market, stock, inventory, display, order	April 5, 2013
Martha tries to run Tio Jorge's market.
80b	10b	"Bye Bye Burger Boy"	business, customer, commercial, advertisement, market(ing)	April 5, 2013
Burger Boy, the gang's favorite childhood restaurant, is going out of business.

=== Season 5 (2013) ===
This season is actually season 4 in terms of production order.

In this season, Alex Ferris was replaced by Valin Shinyei and Trevor Lim for the roles of T.D. Kennelly and Milo Lee, respectively, as his voice has matured significantly since the previous season. Michelle Creber has also been replaced by Ashlyn Drummond as the voice of Alice Boxwood. Kenan Thompson guest stars in the episode "Stanley Saves the Day".

No. overall	No. in season	Title	Vocabulary words	Original release date
81a	1a	"Puppy Skits"	paleontologist, era, age, past	June 24, 2013
Martha begins to remember how Skits, when he was a puppy, was adopted by T.D.
81b	1b	"Dinosaurs in Trouble!"	fund, fossil, archeologist	June 24, 2013
Milo and Truman visit the museum to save the fossil exhibit.
82a	2a	"The Puppy Tooth Fairy"	anticipation, dejected, determined, exhausted, concerned	June 25, 2013
Martha and Skits both decide to be the tooth fairies for puppies.
82b	2b	"Martha's Blue Period"	morose, pitiful, blue, mope(ing), sentimental	June 25, 2013
Martha becomes depressed after Helen leaves for art camp.
83a	3a	"The Puppy Show"	gist, brainstorm, concept, situation, introduce	June 26, 2013
TV producer Laslo Huckey wants Martha and the gang to come up with a new TV series for puppies.
83b	3b	"Never Forget to Remember"	certain, specific, sure, detail, previous(ly)	June 26, 2013
Everyone wants to play kick-up but the ball is missing, so the gang tries to remember who had the ball last.
84a	4a	"Martha's Puppy"	demonstrate, skill, pupil, regress, example	June 27, 2013
Martha thinks that adding another puppy to the family would be a good idea, but the family disagrees so she teaches Jake how to be her puppy.
84b	4b	"The Cheating Chum Caper"	quiz, cheat(ing), chum, cram, tutor	June 27, 2013
After T.D. aces a quiz, Helen becomes convinced that he cheated, so she becomes Heroic Helen again to find out the truth.
85a	5a	"Stanley Saves the Day"	athletic, scrawny, lanky, muscular, burly	November 11, 2013
The gang and Truman's cousin Stanley try to prevent Louie Kablooey and Jimmy Gimmie from robbing the jewelry store again.
85b	5b	"Milo Goes for Gold"	stamina, coordination, dexterity, endurance, swift	November 11, 2013
Milo thinks of new games so he can win at something.
86a	6a	"Mouse Patrol"	predicament, solution, obstacle, exterminat(e)(tor), invade	November 12, 2013
Martha makes friends of mice that she is supposed to get rid of.
86b	6b	"The Big Knockover"	incident, alibi, responsible, leash law, assum(e)(ption), nocturnal	November 12, 2013
When garbage cans across the city are being knocked over, Mrs. Dempson tries to propose a leash law.
87a	7a	"My Mother the Dog"	responsible, authentic, accurat(e)(cy), impersonat(e)(ion)	November 13, 2013
Martha becomes adept at impersonating Helen's mom.
87b	7b	"Martha's Must-Have"	bogus, phony, artificial, cheap, expensive	November 13, 2013
Martha obsesses over a special collar that she believes makes people give canines food.
88a	8a	"The Return of Ralph"	stay, remain, migrat(e)(ion), pause	November 14, 2013
Ralph the duck returns to the household after the Lorraines buy an HDTV.
88b	8b	"Little Bo's Sheep"	halt, persistent, route, dawdle	November 14, 2013
Martha and Helen help a border collie herd an easily distracted sheep to attend the herding festival.

=== Season 6 (2014) ===
This season is actually season 5 in terms of production order.

No. overall	No. in season	Title	Vocabulary words	Original release date
89a	1a	"T.D. Gives a Report"	apathetic, averse, avid, eliminate, indifferent, passionate	March 31, 2014
T.D. has his report that was assigned by Mrs. Clusky.
89b	1b	"Martha's Canine Cleaners"	destroy, mess, ruin, spotless, tear	March 31, 2014
Martha and Skits both try to help Milo's puppy Lily fix the torn pillow.
90a	2a	"April Fools"	convince, dupe, ploy, prank, ruse	April 1, 2014
T.D. has been pranking his friends a lot.
90b	2b	"Bully for You!"	harass, intimidate, pick(ing) on, reluctant, tease	April 1, 2014
Martha and Skits meet with a bully dog named Jaws.
91a	3a	"Bookbots 3: Fit Fights Fat"	fitness, in shape, lazy, sluggish, strength	May 14, 2014
Bookbots are back and they try to exercise before stopping a suspicious villain.
91b	3b	"Grandpa Bernie Cleans"	achey, elderly, mobility, vigor, youthful	May 14, 2014
Helen, T.D, Martha, and Skits help Grandpa Bernie to clean his garage.
92a	4a	"Thou Callest Me a Dog"	dialogue, director, monologue, producer, soliloquy	June 16, 2014
There is a consummation devoutly to be wished and achieved when Martha swallows Hamlet.
92b	4b	"Martha's Paper Chase"	confirm, feature, integrity, topic, verify	June 16, 2014
Carolina needs a headline while Senior Canine Reporter Martha confirms and writes a front page: the whereabouts of Big Minnie.
93a	5a	"Alice Tells a Story"	comprehend, digress, edit, order, tangent	June 17, 2014
Alice tells the story of how she got Nelson.
93b	5b	"Pirates and Princess"	narrative, recap, scenario, summary, theme	June 17, 2014
Princesses Carolina, Alice and Helen needeth a castle while Skipper Truman and First Mate T.D. are scouring the land for a ship.
94a	6a	"Tomato, You Say"	image, indicate, insignia, remind, symbol	June 18, 2014
Helen wants to know why T.D. has a tomato on his shirt.
94b	6b	"Martha Questions"	convey, inquire, period, punctuation, question mark	June 18, 2014
Martha is speaking in questions.
95a	7a	"Martha's Sweater"	dignify, fib, hideous, loathe, undignify	November 17, 2014
Martha sets out to prove that no sweater can withstand the rugged lifestyle of a dog.
95b	7b	"The Mystery of the Missing Dinosaur"	absorbing, appealing, fascinating, intriguing, rendezvous	November 17, 2014
T.D. is pulled into a mystery that even he could not dream up.
96a	8a	"Martha's Holiday Surprise"	attack, comfort, nourish, secure, snuggle	November 18, 2014
Martha and Skits trample into the snow-capped city to rescue the endangered cat and her young cat.
96b	8b	"We're Powerless!"	blackout, chill, discomfort, shiver, starve	November 18, 2014
A blackout renders Helen, T.D., and Truman incapable of playing their favorite video game.

== See also ==
- Martha Speaks (book)
- Martha Speaks (television series)
