= Anansi the Spider =

Anansi the Spider may refer to:

- Anansi, a trickster in the folk tales of the Ashanti people of Ghana
- Anansi (Static Shock), a hero in the cartoon series Static Shock
- Anansi the Spider (book), a children's picture book by Gerald McDermott, published in 1972
