= Martha Speaks (TV series) =

Animated children's TV series

- Genre: Children's television series Educational
- Created by: Susan Meddaugh
- Based on: Martha Speaks by Susan Meddaugh
- Developed by: Ken Scarborough
- Written by: Ken Scarborough
- Directed by: Dallas Parker; Colleen Holub
- Voices of: Tabitha St. Germain; Madeleine Peters; Brian Drummond; Alex Ferris; Valin Shinyei; Cedric Payne; Christina Crivici; Michelle Creber; Vanesa Tomasino; Nicole Oliver; Kathleen Barr; French Tickner; Maxine Miller; Matt Hill; Samuel Vincent; Terry Klassen
- Theme music composer: Daniel Ingram; Hal Beckett
- Opening theme: "Martha Speaks" (lyrics by Ken Scarborough) by Robert Wilson (a few spoken-word lines provided by Tabitha St. Germain)
- Ending theme: "Martha Speaks" (instrumental)
- Composers: Daniel Ingram; Steffan Andrews
- Countries of origin: United States; Canada
- Original language: English
- No. of seasons: 6
- No. of episodes: 96 (183 segments) (list of episodes)

Production
- Executive producers: Carol Greenwald; Chris Bartleman (seasons 1–4); Blair Peters (seasons 1–4)
- Producer: Sarah Wall
- Running time: 28 minutes (approximately 13 minutes per episode)
- Production companies: WGBH Boston; Studio B Productions (seasons 1–3); DHX Media Vancouver (season 4); Oasis Animation (seasons 5–6)

Original release
- Network: PBS Kids
- Release: September 1, 2008 – November 18, 2014

Martha Speaks is an animated educational children's television series based on the 1992 children's book of the same name by Susan Meddaugh and debuted on September 1, 2008, on PBS, on the PBS Kids and PBS Kids Go! programming blocks as part of their rebrand. The series was produced by WGBH Boston, with animation by DHX Media/Vancouver for the first four seasons and Oasis Animation for the final two seasons of the series.

The series focuses mainly on synonyms, phonics, and vocabulary, with each episode featuring an underlying theme illustrated with a wide variety of keywords. The show also occasionally focuses on introducing children aged four to seven to different concepts of science, history, astronomy and other learning concepts (from the Spanish language to passing mentions of it). (Note: Carolina and Mariella Lorraine are fluent Spanish speakers. Additionally, Truman Oatley references the works of William Shakespeare in a few episodes, such as "Oh, nooo!" where he mentions Hamlet, while season 2 episodes "Dogs in Space" and "Dogs from Space" focus on vocabulary such as "Solar System", "orbit", "planet", "star", the "moons of Jupiter" and "constellation".)

On July 6, 2009, the series was renewed for a second season, which premiered on September 14, 2009. On August 2, 2010, the series was renewed for another two seasons. The third season premiered on October 11, 2010, and the fourth season premiered on February 20, 2012. On April 29, 2013, the series was renewed for an additional two seasons. The fifth season premiered on June 24, 2013, and the sixth season premiered on March 31, 2014.

On October 10, 2014, it was announced that the sixth season would be its last. The series finale aired on November 18, 2014.

== Premise ==
The series revolves around a talking dog named Martha (voiced by Tabitha St. Germain), who is owned by 11-year-old Helen Lorraine (known in the books as Helen Finney). When Helen fed Martha alphabet soup, the pasta letters somehow traveled to her brain rather than her stomach, giving her the ability to speak human words. The show takes place in the fictional city of Wagstaff City.

== Episodes ==
Season	Segments	Episodes	Originally released	
Season	Segments	Episodes	First released	Last released
1	78	40	September 1, 2008	July 17, 2009
2	27	15 (Note: The second half of the season was split into a third season, bringing the number of episodes to 15.)	September 14, 2009	May 14, 2010
3	29	15	October 11, 2010	October 3, 2011
4	18	10	February 20, 2012	April 5, 2013
5	16	8	June 24, 2013	November 14, 2013
6	16	8	March 31, 2014	November 18, 2014

== Characters ==
=== Main ===
==== Animals ====
- Martha Lorraine (voiced by Tabitha St. Germain) is the titular protagonist. Martha is a talking Labrador Retriever mix that was born an energetic stray and was put in the dog pound as a puppy. She gained the ability to talk after Helen gave her a bowl of alphabet soup; the letters in the soup went to her brain instead of her stomach. In order to retain this ability, Martha has to continue to eat the soup. She is also capable of speaking many different languages if the soup she eats is from another country, but can only speak one language at a time (e.g., if she were to eat a can of soup from Poland, she'd only be able to speak Polish until she was fed another can). Though, the phenomenon couldn't be repeated with another dog. She was based on a dog owned by Susan Meddaugh, which in turn may have been named after the dog in subject of The Beatles song "Martha My Dear". She can understand most animal languages, except for a few exotic animals such as monkeys and giraffes. These languages are difficult, as slight elongation or slightly higher pitch will mean something entirely altered. In the episode "Itchy Martha", Martha teaches T.D.'s father to speak a word in dog, coaching him to say it exactly right. Almost all animals are able to understand some sort of human language, but are not able to speak it. In a newer episode, it is stated that Martha understands a wide range of animal languages, possibly because they have the same grammar system. She has had three superhero alter-egos.
- Skits Lorraine (voiced by Brian Drummond) is Helen's other dog, who at first tries eating the same alphabet soup but doesn't share the same talking ability. Though he is unable to speak, he is nonetheless a very smart dog. He was found by T.D., since he was unable to keep Skits because his father is allergic to dogs.

==== Children ====
- Helen Lorraine (voiced by Madeleine Peters) is Martha's and Skits' tomboyish owner who is usually the voice of reason of the group. Helen is closest to Martha and thinks of Martha as her best friend. Out of the six main kids, Helen is very sensible. Despite this, she can be a bit overbearing and even show her rough side. She always hangs around her friends, but T.D. is said to be her best friend. She is 11 years old and biracial, coming from a Caucasian father and a Latin-American mother. In "Verb Dog", it's revealed that she has her own superhero alter ego, "When Action Calls!", is very huge and can brainwash dogs simply by calling their names.
- T.D. Kennelly (voiced by Alex Ferris in seasons 1–4 and by Valin Shinyei in seasons 5–6) is the best friend of Helen. His father, O.G., is an inventor, and his mother serves as the vice-principal at his school. T.D. has a grandfather named C.K., who is employed as a farmhand, and a younger cousin referred to as C.D. He has also mentioned an older sister, who remains unnamed and has not appeared in the series due to her academic commitments. T.D. embraces a Bohemian lifestyle characterized by surreal elements. In the episode "Verb Dog, When Action Calls!", he features a robotic alter-ego equipped with tentacles that extend from his back.
- Truman Oatley (voiced by Cedric Payne) is another one of Helen's best friends who enjoys reading lots of historical works of literature and is prone to seasickness. He is African-American. He is often a pessimist who focuses on the negative without any confidence and is unwilling to try other things because he is frequently convinced that the activity is pointless; additionally he is afraid of insects. Truman is younger than Helen, T.D., and Alice. Oddly, the design on his vest closely resembles the logo of the Santiago Metro.
- Alice Boxwood (voiced by Christina Crivici in seasons 1–3, Michelle Creber in season 4 and Ashlyn Drummond in seasons 5–6) is another one of Helen's best friends. She has an older brother named Ronald who mocks her a lot, but still cares for, and a pet cat named Nelson, with whom Martha is mortal enemies. Her superhero alter-ego possesses ice powers; her only weakness is anyone making her laugh, which causes her to lose control of her powers and freeze herself.
- James "Jake" Lorraine (voiced by Tabitha St. Germain) is Helen's toddler sibling whom Martha enjoys teaching on how to talk, with unsuccessful attempts. His birth is emphasized in the episode "The Jakey Express". In the Spanish dub, he is named "Pedrito".

==== Adults ====
- Danny Lorraine (also voiced by Brian Drummond) is Helen's father who works as a bus driver and an actor in the community theater. He is friendly but very stern, though part-time, he has a somewhat immature personality, such as singing music at home and even acting like a performer when he's not at the community theater.
- Mariella Lorraine (voiced by Tabitha St. Germain) is Helen's Latina florist mother, who works as an actor in the community theater. She often uses Spanish words and phrases, giving the translation shortly afterwards. Her parents and maiden surname are unknown, but her brother Jorge (Carolina's father) is seen in the series.
- Mrs. Clusky (voiced by Nicole Oliver) is Helen's teacher from Montreal. She was initially very shocked when she found out that Martha can speak, though has since gotten used to it. She has three nieces, and a white poodle, François, who is very spoiled and demanding.

=== Recurring ===
==== Children ====
- Carolina (voiced by Vanesa Tomasino) is Helen's maternal cousin. She is very fashion-conscious of others; in music, she sings off-key. She is described as a know-it-all with some signs of being shallow. Like her aunt Mariella (Helen's mother), Carolina often uses Spanish words and phrases, giving the translation shortly afterwards. Her father is named Jorge (Mariella's brother).
- Ronald Boxwood (voiced by Kathleen Barr) is Alice's older brother who can tend to act very arrogant, and he loves to scare, show-off, tease and annoy Alice and her friends a lot, including Martha. He also loves Nelson (him and Alice's pet cat). He may get Alice annoyed but he still shows love for his family, Alice her friends and also Martha.

==== Adults ====
- Lucille and Bernard Lorraine are Helen's grandparents. They live simple and odd lifestyles and are allergic to certain things, such as flowers and bacon.
- Mr. Pangborn is a neighbor who recently moved to Martha's neighborhood. He has an elderly cat named Lightning and previously had a serious mice issue. Once Martha figured out how to deal with them, Mr. Pangborn allowed the mice to live at his house.

== Production ==
The series was executive-produced by WGBH employee Carol Greenwald (who first contacted Meddaugh during production of the PBS series Arthur) and developed for television by Emmy Award-winning writer Kenneth "Ken" Scarborough (the head writer for shows such as Arthur and Doug). Among other writers and screenwriters were Joe Fallon, Peter Hirsch, Kathy Waugh, Raye Lankford, Pippin Parker, Ron Holsey, Jessica Carleton, Matt Steinglass and Dietrich Smith. Canadian composers Daniel Ingram and Harold Foxton Beckett composed the music for both the series and the theme song, while Ken Scarborough wrote the lyrics for and Robert Wilson performed the latter.

The series was produced in Vancouver by DHX Media Vancouver (formerly Studio B Productions) using Flash. Meddaugh, the author of the book, was involved in the series and oversaw the production: despite some concerns over what would the way word definitions be incorporated into a television series, she was satisfied they didn't interrupt the plot's flowing concept.

Actor Jon Hamm along with then-girlfriend Jennifer Westfeldt and their German Shepherd mix Cora were animated into cartoon versions of themselves for an episode as guest stars.

=== Format ===
In each episode, short animated segments related to the main parts are presented in three occasions: one between the opening theme and the first part; another one between two parts; and the other between the second part and the closing credits. However, those short segments are excluded from versions outside the United States and Canada.

== Broadcast ==
Martha Speaks debuted on PBS Kids on September 1, 2008, and ended on November 18, 2014, with reruns continuing until October 2, 2022. Select local stations continued to broadcast reruns until November 17, 2025.

The series also aired on TVOKids in Canada, on Discovery Kids in Latin America, on Disney Junior in the Netherlands, on CBBC in the United Kingdom and on Nick Jr. in Australia and New Zealand.

== Home media ==
On January 3, 2009, some episodes of the television series were available for limited theatrical release. Also, a DVD set of the series featuring 8 episodes from the first season was released on March 9, 2010; since then, several DVDs were also released.

== Streaming ==
Until July 2015, seasons 1-3 were available to stream on Netflix. Since then, the series is now available to stream on Amazon Prime Video (albeit all episodes are now available).

== Merchandise ==
Before the series premiered, PBS Kids reported that episodes of the series were available for purchase via downloading, to date. In January 2010, Martha Speaks launched its first list of official tie-in books with: 24-page readers and several chapter books; and also a picture book.
