= After Henry =

After Henry may refer to:

- After Henry (radio series), a BBC Radio 4 situation comedy by Simon Brett
- After Henry (TV series), a Thames Television situation comedy, based on the radio series
- After Henry (book), a book of essays by Joan Didion
