= Arrow to the Sun =

1974 picture book by Gerald McDermott

- Author: Gerald McDermott
- Illustrator: Gerald McDermott
- Genre: Children's picture book
- Publisher: Viking Press
- Publication date: 1974
- Publication place: United States
- ISBN: 0-670-13369-8
- OCLC: 707401
- Dewey Decimal: 299.7 398.2 E
- LC Class: E99.P9 M25 1974

Arrow to the Sun is a 1973 short film and a 1974 book, both by Gerald McDermott. The book was printed in gouache and ink, Both media are a retelling of a Pueblo tale, specifically an Acoma Pueblo tale, in which a mysterious boy seeks his father. Scholars Debbie Reese and Eliot Singer have both published critiques on inaccuracies in McDermott's retelling, and Jon Stott has claimed that McDermott invented the "Dance of Life depicted on the final page of the story," though Stott himself was not critical of this addition to the retelling.

== Plot ==
Long ago, the Lord of the Sun shoots down the spark of life into the Pueblo, where it reaches a young woman and causes her to give birth to an unnamed son, referred to as "the Boy". When the Boy reaches adolescence, he is ridiculed by the other boys because he has no father. Disheartened, the Boy decides to leave the Pueblo and find his father.

During his journey, the Boy asks the assistance of both a farmer and a sculptress, but both refuse. However, when the Boy asks an elderly arrowsmith, the arrowsmith senses his relation to the Sun and agrees to lend aid. The arrowsmith transforms the Boy into an arrow and launches him to the Sun.

Arriving in the Sun, the boy encounters his father, the Lord, who is skeptical of the Boy's identity as his son. To confirm the Boy's identity, he challenges his son to complete four trials: the Kiva of Lions, the Kiva of Serpents, the Kiva of Bees, and the Kiva of Lightning; the boy emerges from the Kiva of Lightning with newfound powers stemming from the Sun.

After the Boy endures these trials, the Lord finally acknowledges him as his son, and he sends the Boy back to Earth to bring the Sun's spirit into the world of men. The denizens of the Pueblo welcome the Boy home with the Dance of Life to commemorate his return.

== Reception ==
The film was named to the list of ALA Notable Children's Videos in 1973.

The book won the 1975 Caldecott Medal for illustration.

Awards
Preceded by Duffy and the Devil	Caldecott Medal recipient 1975	Succeeded by Why Mosquitoes Buzz in People's Ears
