= Cold in the Earth =

1992 novel by Ann Granger

- First edition
- Author: Ann Granger
- Series: Mitchell and Markby
- Genre: Mystery novel
- Publisher: Headline
- Publication date: 1992
- Publication place: England
- Media type: Print (hardback and paperback)
- Pages: 256 pp
- ISBN: 978-0380722136
- Dewey Decimal: 823/.914 20
- Preceded by: A Season For Murder
- Followed by: Murder among us

Cold in the Earth (1992) is Ann Granger's third Mitchell and Markby Mystery. Set in rural England, it is about three seemingly unconnected deaths which occur in quick succession in the fictitious town of Bamford in the Cotswolds. Chief Inspector Alan Markby and his team are unofficially joined in their investigations by consular official Meredith Mitchell—who had been introduced in Say It with Poison— who takes leave from her London job to spend Holy Week in the country.

== Plot summary ==
The first death is from a drug overdose; the victim is a promising young girl from a respectable local family. However, Markby's investigations, which aim at getting hold of the suppliers, do not lead anywhere. Shortly afterwards, the body of a stranger, possibly a foreigner, is found buried in a shallow grave in a trench at a building site on the outskirts of Bamford. Finally, a local construction foreman employed at that very building site is slain to death on a lonely country road.

Mitchell and Markby probe into the dubious roles played by land developers, diehard farmers and juvenile delinquents alike.

== Development history ==
=== Publication history ===
The novel was published in the United States by St. Martin's Press on April 20, 1993.

== Reception ==
The book received positive reception from critics, with Kirkus Reviews complimenting the mystery and Publishers Weekly describing the characterization as "first-rate."
