= J. S. Marcus =

American novelist (born 1962)

- Born: 1962 (age 63–64); Milwaukee, Wisconsin, U.S.
- Education: University of Wisconsin–Madison; University of Wisconsin Law School
- Occupation: Novelist
- Writing career
- Notable awards: Whiting Award (1992)

J. S. Marcus (born 1962) is an American novelist.

== Early life and education ==
J.S. Marcus was born in Milwaukee, in 1962. He attended the University of Wisconsin–Madison and the University of Wisconsin Law School.

== Career ==
Marcus' work has appeared in Harper's (1986 and 1990), The New York Review of Books, and The Wall Street Journal, where he regularly writes about real estate and art.

== Recognition and awards ==
- ?: Senior fellow at the Remarque Institute of European studies at New York University
- 1992: Whiting Award for Fiction
- 2001: Santa Maddalena Foundation fellow'
- 2004-5: James Merrill House fellow in Stonington, CT

== Works ==
- The Captain's Fire: a novel. Knopf. 1996. ISBN 978-0-679-40184-1.
- The Art of Cartography: stories. Knopf. 1991. ISBN 978-0-394-55946-9.

=== Anthologies ===
- Raphael Kadushin, ed. (2004). "Everywhere". Wonderlands: good gay travel writing. Terrace Books. ISBN 978-0-299-19754-4.
