= R.S. Jones =

American novelist (1954–2001)

- Born: Robert S. Jones; March 3, 1954; Santa Monica, California, U.S.
- Died: August 13, 2001 (aged 47)
- Education: Hobart and William Smith Colleges; University of Chicago Divinity School
- Occupations: Novelist; editor
- Writing career
- Notable awards: Whiting Award (1992)

Robert S. Jones (March 3, 1954 – August 13, 2001) was an American novelist and editor. He was born in Santa Monica, California.

== Life ==
Jones grew up in southern California and northern New Jersey. His undergraduate studies were at Hobart and William Smith Colleges in central New York State. He received a master's degree from the Divinity School of the University of Chicago, where he studied with the theologian David Tracy.

After graduate school Jones taught courses in Women's Studies, Art History, and Literature part-time at Hobart and William Smith Colleges, and in a college program for inmates at Attica Correctional Facility in upstate New York.

At the height of the AIDS crisis in the U.S., Jones was media coordinator of the New York chapter of the ACT UP AIDS Awareness Organization.

Jones began work as an editor at HarperCollins (then Harper & Row) in 1985, and at the time of his death in 2001 was Editor in Chief.

== Awards ==
- In 1992, Jones received the Whiting Award for emerging writers. The award was presented by Ralph Ellison, the author of Invisible Man.

== Work ==
As an editor Jones was often acknowledged by the authors with whom he worked as an advocate and supporter. Richard Bausch expressed his gratitude to Jones "for fighting" in Good Evening Mr. and Mrs. America, and All the Ships at Sea, published in 1996. Russell Banks recognized Jones for his support in the creation of Cloudsplitter (novel) (1998) and The Angel on the Roof (2000), as did Armistead Maupin for The Night Listener (2000). John Colapinto cited Jones' painstaking explanation for editorial changes in the acknowledgments for As Nature Made Him (2000).

Bel Canto, another of his editing projects, was dedicated to him by the author, Ann Patchett.

In addition to his work as an editor, Jones published two novels and a number of short stories. His first novel Force of Gravity was described by Iris Murdoch as "a beautiful, terrifying tale of a quiet descent into insanity." His second novel, Walking on Air "examines all the psychological nuances of the dying and their caretakers."

Jones' shorter work appeared in Q and in Best American Gay Fiction 1996.

- Force of Gravity. Viking. 1991. ISBN 978-0-670-83591-1.
- Walking on Air. Houghton Mifflin. 1995. ISBN 0-395-74545-4.
- "I Am Making a Mistake". Best American Gay Fiction 1996. Back Bay Books. 1996. ISBN 0316103179. ISBN 978-0316103176
