= Patricia Schonstein =

South African-Italian novelist, poet, memoirist, author and curator

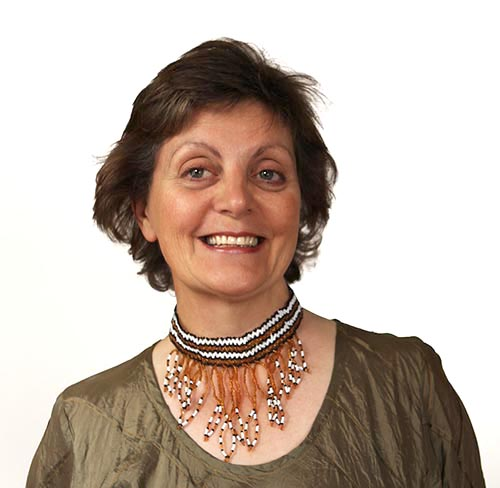
- Born: Patricia Schonstein; 12 March 1952 (age 74); Bulawayo, Southern Rhodesia (now Zimbabwe)
- Occupation: Author
- Spouse: Don Pinnock
- Awards: Prix du Marais 2005, Percy FitzPatrick Award 2002
- Website: www.patriciaschonstein.com

Patricia Schonstein (born 1952), who also writes under the name Patricia Schonstein-Pinnock, is a South African-Italian novelist, poet, memoirist, author of children’s books and curator of anthologies. Schonstein, whose novels variously employ the genres of magical-realism, meta-fiction and narrative fiction, is famous for novels such as Skyline and A Time of Angels.

Schonstein's novels draw heavily on her personal experiences of growing up in Central Africa and to historical events related to the Inquisition, the Holocaust, the Rhodesian War, and apartheid. She pays homage to the child-victims of war in Africa and to refugees, weaving together harsh realities with elements of myth and magic.

Her work has been translated into Afrikaans, Dutch, French, German, Italian, Norwegian, Spanish and Swedish.

== Life ==
Born and raised in Southern Rhodesia (now Zimbabwe), Schonstein lives in South Africa where she works as a full-time author. She has Jewish heritage.

== Literary career ==
Schonstein holds a master's degree in creative writing from the University of Cape Town, supervised by 2003 Nobel Literature Laureate J. M. Coetzee, who has endorsed much of her work. Her poetry has been endorsed by 1984 Nobel Peace Laureate Archbishop Desmond Tutu.

Schonstein served on the Poetry in McGregor committee and presented their annual ‘Patricia Schonstein – Poetry in McGregor Award’ (2013-2025).

She has been an honorary member of Southern African Friendship and Aid Network Sweden (SAFRAN) since 2008, and served as deputy editor of the poetry quarterly, Stanzas (2015-2020).

== Awards ==
- Her debut novel, Skyline, won the French Prix du Marais in 2005; won the Percy FitzPatrick Award in 2002; took second place in the South African Sunday Times Fiction Award in 2001; was long-listed for the 2002 International Dublin Literary Award; was listed in the South African Twenty-Five Must-Reads in 2007; and was listed in the Swedish En Bok for alle.
- A Time of Angels took second place in the South African Sunday Times Fiction Award in 2004; and was short-listed for the 2004 Booksellers’ Choice Award.
- The Apothecary’s Daughter was listed in the Sunday Times Read Your Way Through Democracy in 2014.
- Banquet at Brabazan was short-listed for the Commonwealth Writer’s Prize Africa Best Book in 2011.
- Schonstein was the winner of the 1997 Young Africa Award (Short Stories Category).

== Works ==
=== Novels ===
- Skyline, 2000
- A Time of Angels, 2003
- The Apothecary's Daughter, 2004
- A Quilt of Dreams, 2006
- The Master's Ruse, 2008
- Banquet at Brabazan, 2010
- The Inn at Helsvlakte, 2020
- The Glass Island, 2026

=== For children ===
- Sing, Africa! Poems and Song for Young Children, 1990
- Thobileʼs dream, 1991
- Thobile and the Tortoises, 1992
- The King Who Loved Birds, 1992
- Maggie, Mango & Scottie – An Adventure in Africa, 2016
- Ouma's Autumn, 1993
- Saturday in Africa: Living History Through Poetry, 1996
- The Phoebe Book of Poems for Children, 2022
- The Most Amazing Story of Phoebe and the Trojan Elephant, 2026

=== Poetry ===
- The Unknown Child: Poems of War, Loss and Longing, 2009
- A Gathering of Madonnas, and Other Poems, 2001

=== Fable ===
- The Naming of He-Who-Has-No-Name, 2023

=== Non-fiction ===
- Xhosa: a Cultural Grammar for Beginners, 1994
- Thrown Among the Bones—My Life in Fiction, 2022
- Ways of Living: Some Gathered Insights, 2024

=== Curated anthologies ===
- Africa! My Africa! An Anthology of Poems, 2012
- Africa Ablaze! Poems & Prose Pieces of War & Civil Conflict, 2013
- Heart of Africa! Poems of Love, Loss and Longing, 2014
- Absolute Africa! An anthology of poems, 2018
- Naturally Africa! An anthology of earth poems, 2019 (Selected with Dan Wylie)
- McGregor Poetry Festival 2013 Anthology: Imagination and Passion
- McGregor Poetry Festival 2014 Anthology: Depth and Wonder
- McGregor Poetry Festival 2015 Anthology: Beauty and Truth
- McGregor Poetry Festival 2016 Anthology: Voices on Fire
- McGregor Poetry Festival 2017 Anthology: Joy and Abundance
- McGregor Poetry Festival 2018 Anthology: The Sound of Water
- McGregor Poetry Festival 2019 Anthology: The Heart of the Moon
- McGregor Poetry Festival 2020 Anthology: Love in the Time of Covid
- McGregor Poetry Festival 2021 Anthology: The Garden of the Beloved
- McGregor Poetry Festival 2022 Anthology: Touching the Wild
- McGregor Poetry Festival 2023: The Hugh Hodge Open Mic Anthology

=== Appearances in anthologies ===
- Lovely Beyond Any Singing: Landscape in South African Literature, compiled by Helen Moffett, Double Storey Books, 2006
- Nice Times! A Book of South African Pleasures and Delights, compiled by Henrietta Rose-Innes, Double Storey Books, 2006
- Land i förändring: en bok om det nya Sydafrika, edited by Annika Forsberg et al, Bokförlaget Tranan, 2004
- Keys, compiled by Brenda Cooper, Maskew Miller Longman (Pty) Ltd, 1998
