= Zomo the Rabbit =

Book by Gerald McDermott

Zomo the Rabbit: A Trickster Tale from West Africa
- Author: Gerald McDermott
- Illustrator: Gerald McDermott
- Language: English
- Genre: Children's literature, picture book, Trickster tale, African folklore
- Published: 1992 (Harcourt Brace Jovanovich)
- Publication place: USA
- Media type: Print (hardback)
- ISBN: 9780152999674
- OCLC: 23693546

Zomo the Rabbit is a 1992 book by Gerald McDermott based on a Nigerian folktale from Hausa folklore that explains why the rabbit runs so fast from other animals.

== Reception ==
Booklist, in a starred review of Zomo the Rabbit, wrote "Wildly exuberant, full of slapstick and mischief, this version of an enduring Nigerian trickster tale is a storyteller's delight." and School Library Journal wrote "With its small but triumphant hero clad in a colorful dashiki and a cap, its dazzling design, and its great good humor, this story will be a pleasure to use with children."

Publishers Weekly called it a "straightforward retelling" and wrote "McDermott's gouache illustrations in brilliant hues of fuchsia, green and orange recall the color and geometric lines of West African textiles."

== Awards ==
- 1993 National Council of Teachers of English (NCTE) Adventuring with Books book
- 1993-94 Alabama (Camellia) Children's Choice Picture Book Award - winner
- 1994 Anne Izard Storytellers' Choice Award - winner
- 1994 Florida Reading Association Children's Book Award - winner
- 1994 NCTE Kaleidoscope book
- 1996 Montana Treasure State Picture Book Award - winner
- 1996 Young Hoosier Picture Book Award - winner
