= Up North (book) =

1992 travel book by Charles Jennings

- Author: Charles Jennings
- Language: English
- Genre: Travel book
- Publication date: 1992

Up North is a travel book by Charles Jennings, detailing his excursion from the south to Northern England. Throughout the duration of the book, written in 1992, he conveys a sense of grimness and hopelessness "up north" with a certain acerbic wit; he suggests, for instance, that the name Grimsby may be dissected as combining 'grim' and 'by the sea'.

The Mayor of Grimsby at the time commented that Jennings "should have stayed under his duvet down south."
