= Old Turtle =

1992 book by Douglas Wood

- Author: Douglas Wood
- Illustrator: Cheng-Khee Chee
- Language: English
- Genre: Children's literature, picture book, Mythology
- Published: 1992 (Scholastic Press)
- Publication place: USA
- Media type: Print (hardback)
- Pages: 56
- ISBN: 9780439309080
- OCLC: 463400510

Old Turtle is a 1992 book by Douglas Wood about Creation and the nature of God.

== Reception ==
School Library Journal, in a review of Old Turtle, wrote "Environmentally conscious, gender-balanced (references to God include She), and spiritual in mood, this is a New Age fable; its message of saving the Earth is told in lyrical prose and in pictures that delight the eye." and Kirkus Reviews called it "A handsome, thought-provoking book, especially appropriate for collections that support religious instruction."

Publishers Weekly called it "an enchanting book.", but found "Difficult ideas, painterly art and sophisticated language make this a book primarily for adults."

== Awards ==
- 1992 ILA Children's and Young Adults' Book Awards - Younger Reader Category
- 1993 American Booksellers’ Children's Book of the Year - winner
- 1993 International Reading Association Children's Book Award - Picture Book
