= Ann Granger =

British crime writer (1939–2025)

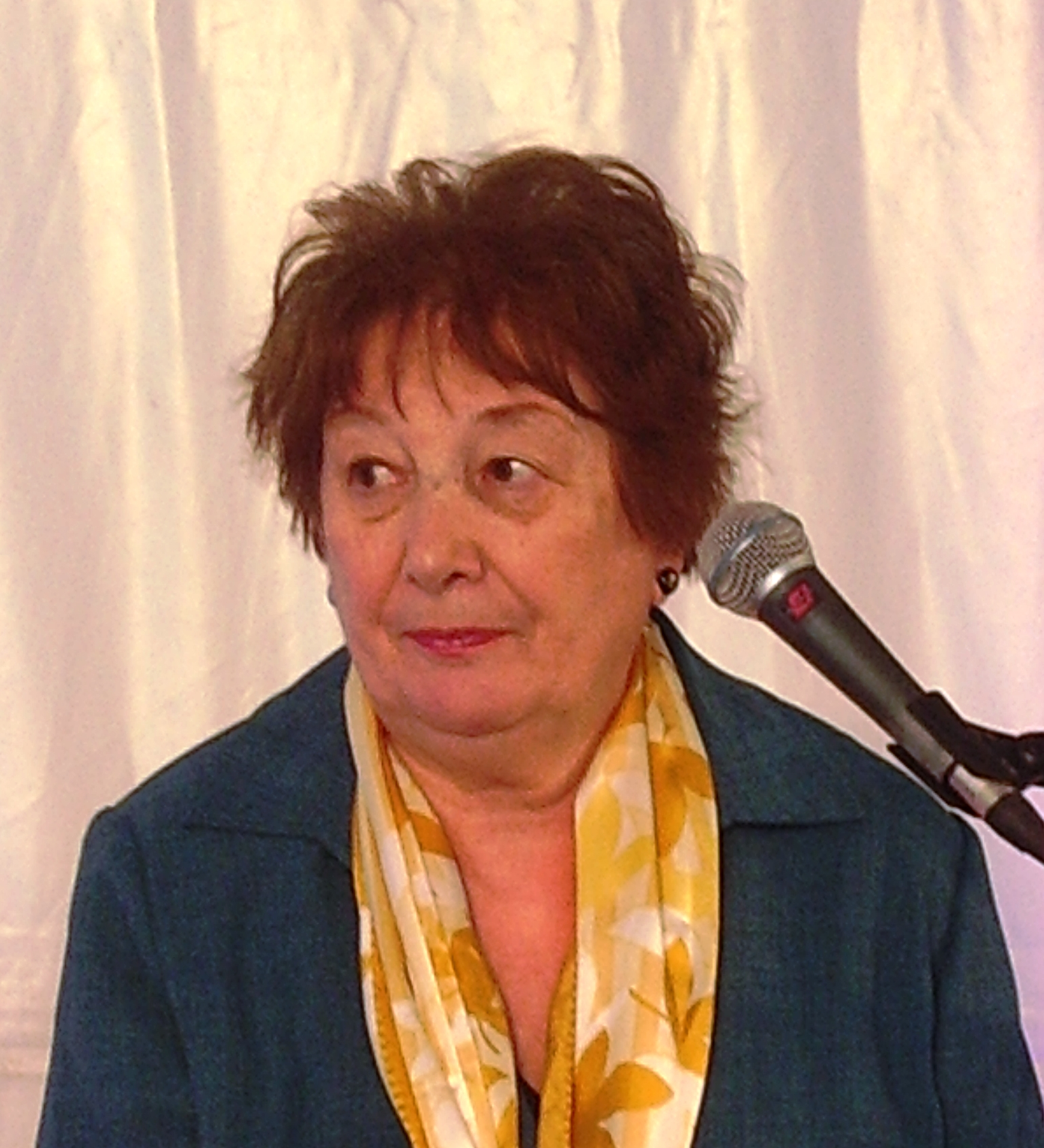
- Granger in 2009
- Born: Patricia Ann Granger; 12 July 1939; Portsmouth, England
- Died: 7 September 2025 (aged 86)
- Education: University of London
- Occupation: Writer
- Spouse: John Hulme (m. 1966; died 2014)
- Children: 2
- Writing career
- Pen name: Ann Hulme
- Period: 1979–2024
- Genre: Crime fiction
- Notable work: Cold in the Earth

Patricia Ann Granger (12 July 1939 – 7 September 2025) was a British crime writer, writing as Ann Hulme and Ann Granger. She authored almost forty books in four different detective series, as well as a collection of short stories.

== Early life and education ==
Granger was born in Portsmouth, England, on 12 July 1939, to Eugene Granger, a Royal Navy officer, and Norah née Davey. She attended the Northern Grammar School for Girls, and had thoughts about becoming a veterinarian, but discovered women were not accepted into vet schools because they were not believed to be strong enough. Instead she earned a Modern Languages degree at the University of London, where she first developed a desire to become a writer.

== Early career ==
Realizing that it would take some time to develop a steady income as a writer, Granger instead taught English for a year in France. She then went to work in the visa sections of British consulates and embassies in France, Germany, Yugoslavia and Czechoslovakia. She married John Hulme, a colleague in the foreign service, in 1966, and went with him to Zambia and Germany before returning to live in England with their two children.

== Career as a writer ==
After returning to England, Granger turned her hand to writing, using a version of her married name, Ann Hulme, and produced the historical romance A Poor Relation in 1979. Between 1982 and 1991, Granger produced several more historical romances.

=== Mitchell & Markby ===
In 1991, Granger made the decision to switch to crime novels, saying, "Basically, there is only one plot in love stories: You can describe it in different ways, but you always come back to the subject of man and woman. Crime fiction opens up a world of possibilities for the writer. It lets you tackle deep and difficult issues." Her first crime novel, Say it with Poison, centred on protagonists Meredith Mitchell, a consular officer, and police officer Alan Markby. The book proved popular and Granger wrote 14 more Mitchell & Markby novels between 1991 and 2004.

During the series, Mitchell and Markby became romantically involved, but Granger resisted marrying them, believing that Meredith Mitchell could only work best as an independent woman. She finally married them in the final novel of the series, That Way Murder Lies (2004). A young police officer, Jessica Campbell, made an appearance in this novel — Granger would make her the protagonist of a new series four years later.

In 2022, Granger added one more Mitchell & Markby novel, set in 2005 and featuring the now near-retirement couple, Deadly Company.

=== Fran Varady ===
In 1997, Granger began her second detective series with Asking for Trouble, featuring a very different protagonist, Fran Varady, an out-of-work and temporarily homeless actor. Granger explained, "I wanted to write about someone who is in a completely different situation than Meredith Mitchell: Meredith has a great job, a house, a car, a nice boyfriend, etc. – Fran has nothing. She is totally unattached." Over the next ten years, Granger wrote seven Fran Varady novels.

=== Lizzie Martin & Ben Ross ===
In 2006, as Granger was winding down the Fran Varady series, she wrote A Rare Interest in Corpses, set in Victorian England in the 1860s and featuring Lizzie Martin, a companion to a wealthy widow, and Ben Ross, a police inspector. Although Granger had resisted marrying Mitchell and Markby in her first crime series, she had Martin and Ross marry very early in this series, reasoning that "Due to the restrictions on single women at the time, Lizzie wouldn't have had the freedom to be a detective in a whole series of books. Likewise, she and Ben shouldn't be allowed to spend much time together unsupervised." From 2008 to 2023, Granger added eight more novels to the series.

=== Campbell & Carter ===
In 2009, Granger returned to the modern world with Mud, Muck and Dead Things, a novel set in the Cotswolds and featuring Detective Inspector Jessica "Jess" Campbell and Superintendent Ian Carter; Campbell appeared in the Mitchell and Markby series also. In the sixth installment, An Unfinished Murder, the retired couple Mitchell & Markby play a prominent role. By 2025, Granger had written seven novels in the series.

=== Short stories ===
In 2021, in recognition of thirty years of crime novels, Granger released a collection of eighteen short stories, Mystery in the Making.

== Death ==
Granger died on 7 September 2025, at the age of 86. Her publisher Headline announced her death on 24 September.

== Awards and recognition ==
In 1999, Granger was inducted into the prestigious Detection Club. She was also a member of the Crime Writers' Association in the UK and Sisters in Crime in the US.

Granger's books sold more than one million copies in the UK, and were translated into ten languages. The German versions of her novels made Germany's Top Five Bestseller list more than thirty times and sold millions of copies.

== Bibliography ==
=== Historical romances (selection) ===
- A Poor Relation (1979)
- Summer Heiress (1982)
- The Garden of the Azure Dragon (1986)
- The Unexpected American (1989)
- A Scandalous Bargain (1990)
- False Fortune (1991)

=== Mitchell & Markby mysteries ===
- Say It With Poison (1991)
- A Season for Murder (1991)
- Cold in the Earth (1992)
- Murder Among Us (1992)
- Where Old Bones Lie (1993)
- Flowers for His Funeral (1994)
- A Fine Place for Death (1994)
- Candle for a Corpse (1995)
- A Word After Dying (1996)
- A Touch of Mortality (1996)
- Call the Dead Again (1998)
- Beneath These Stones (1999)
- Shades of Murder (2000)
- A Restless Evil (2002)
- That Way Murder Lies (2004)
- Deadly Company (2022)

=== Fran Varady mysteries ===
- Asking for Trouble (1997)
- Keeping Bad Company (1997)
- Running Scared (1998)
- Risking It All (2001)
- Watching Out (2003)
- Mixing With Murder (2005)
- Rattling the Bones (2007)

=== Ben Ross & Lizzie Martin mysteries ===
- A Rare Interest in Corpses (2006)
- A Mortal Curiosity (2008)
- A Better Quality of Murder (2010)
- A Particular Eye for Villainy (2012)
- The Testimony of the Hanged Man (2014)
- The Dead Woman of Deptford (2016)
- The Murderer's Apprentice (2019)
- The Truth-Seeker's Wife (2021)
- The Old Rogue of Limehouse (2023)

=== Campbell & Carter mysteries ===
- Mud, Muck and Dead things (2009)
- Rack, Ruin and Murder (2011)
- Bricks and Mortality (2013)
- Dead in the Water (2015)
- Rooted in Evil (2017)
- An Unfinished Murder (2018) (featuring Mitchell & Markby)
- A Matter of Murder (2020)
- Death on the Prowl (Audio book released December 2024 in UK)

=== Short story collections ===
- Mystery in the Making (2021)
