= Judith Vigna =

American writer

- Born: Judith Vigna
- Education: St. Martin's School of Art Queens College
- Occupations: advertising copywriter; author; illustrator
- Years active: 1975–present
- Known for: Writing children's books

Judith Helen Vigna (born 1936 ) was a British-American writer who became known in the late 1990s and early 2000s because of her children's books that covered controversial topics such as drug addiction, alcoholism, homosexuality, racism, death of beloved ones, monoparental families, depression, among others.

== Biography ==
Judith Vigna was born in 1936, in England, and studied art both in London and in New York. In 1987 she received the Jane Addams Children's Book Award for her book Nobody Wants a Nuclear War.

== Bibliography ==
She published books mainly in the 1980s and 1990s.

- I live with Daddy
- Daddy's new baby
- Mommy and me by ourselves again
- Anyhow, I'm glad I tried
- Everyone goes as a pumpkin
- When Eric's mom fought cancer
- Couldn't we have a turtle instead?
- Boot weather (ISBN 978-0-8075-0837-4)
- Black Like Kyra, White Like Me (ISBN 978-0-8075-0778-0)
- She's not my real mother
- Saying goodbye to Daddy (ISBN 0807572535)
- Gregory's stitches
- Zio Pasquale's Zoo
- Grandma without me
- My Big Sister Takes Drugs
- Uncle Alfredo's zoo
- The hiding house
- I Wish Daddy Didn't Drink So Much
- The little boy who loved dirt and almost became a Superslob
- Nobody Wants a Nuclear War
- My Two Uncles (1995)
