= Black Like Kyra, White Like Me =

Book by Judith Vigna

- Author: Judith Vigna
- Illustrator: Judith Vigna
- Language: English
- Genre: Children's literature, picture book
- Published: 1992
- Publisher: Albert Whitman and Company
- Publication place: United States of America
- Pages: 32

Black Like Kyra, White Like Me is a 1992 children's picture book written and illustrated by Judith Vigna and published by Albert Whitman and Company. The story tells the tale of a friendship that develops between two young girls of different ethnicities: Christy, the narrator, is Caucasian while her friend Kyra is of African descent. Conflict arises within the story when Kyra’s family, the Kirks, move into Christy’s neighborhood, and racism threatens to tear apart their relationship and the neighborhood. However, the story concludes when both Christy and Kyra’s families develop a mutual trust and reliance on one another.

Written with a socially conscious agenda, Black Like Kyra, White Like Me endeavors to tackle racism and racist prejudices within a text suitable for young children. However, Vigna's writing has received criticism for using perceived stereotypes of black culture.

== Plot ==
When Christy’s friend Kyra moves from a violent neighborhood to Christy’s residential area, Christy’s family and friends react negatively and are hesitant to meet Kyra’s family, the Kirks. As the story progresses, tension escalates when the Kirks are socially rejected at a neighborhood block party and an act of vandalism occurs. However, tension is relieved when Christy’s father apologizes to the Kirks for the racism they have endured, and Christy’s mother offers to call the police after the Kirk’s van is vandalized. As the story concludes, the relationship between Christy and Kyra’s families improves. Christy’s mother drives both her daughter and Kyra to gymnastics and allows her daughter to spend as much time with Kyra as she wants. Moreover, Matt, Julie, and their father move out of Christy and Kyra’s neighborhood, thereby reducing the racial tension.

== Reception ==
Black Like Kyra, White Like Me has received both positive and negative reviews ever since publication in 1992. Often included on lists of controversial children's literature, Black Like Kyra, White Like Me has received backlash for its perceived "racial insensitivity and insincerity ". Moreover, in 2000 Vigna was accused of " reinforcing negative stereotypes about blacks and positive stereotypes about whites " by a customer of the Toronto Public Library, however Black Like Kyra, White Like Me still remained on the library's shelves for public access. Nevertheless, Black Like Kyra, White Like Me, has received praise for being both a teaching tool about racism and a reflection of racial conflict and divide. In addition, in Pittman 's Whited Out: Unique Perspectives on Black Identity and Honors Achievement, Vigna's Black like Kyra, White Like Me is stated to be fundamental in producing and teaching empathy in early childhood development. Furthermore, Vigna's illustrations have been praised for their attractiveness and ability to lighten up the story's heavy mood.
