= A Time of Angels =

2003 novel by Patricia Schonstein

- First edition
- Author: Patricia Schonstein
- Language: English
- Genre: Novel
- Published: 2003 (Parktown: Random House)
- Publication place: South Africa
- Media type: Print (Hardback)
- Pages: 223
- ISBN: 9780593051764
- OCLC: 749961446

A Time of Angels is a 2003 book by Patricia Schonstein and follows the lives of a number of Italian Jews in the post-apartheid era in South Africa.

== Plot ==
The novel is set in and around Long Street in Cape Town. It centres on a rivalry between two life-long friends, Primo Verona, a clairvoyant, and Pasquale Benvenuto, a chef. They are the sons of Jewish Holocaust survivors from Italy. Primo's wife, Beatrice, is also a childhood friend of the men, and to complicate matters, she was Pasquale's lover before she married Primo. Twenty years after the marriage, Pasquale is keen for Beatrice to leave Primo so that they can get back together. Primo is devastates by the betrayal and seeks to win back Beatrice with spells. The spells go awfully awry, destroying Pasquale's business.

== Reception ==
The Guardian, in a review of A Time of Angels, wrote "Schonstein's magical realism is dense with sensual imagery - taste, touch, smell, shimmering visions. At first it is confusing to be recalled so insistently to the good things of life at the same time as being continuously reminded of horror and war; it seems almost shocking that Schonstein can list the ingredients of bostrengo - a delicious cake - and then, almost in the same breath, recount a massacre of children and old men.

However, this uneasy mixture is the whole point of Schonstein's narrative."

Other reviews have found it comparable to Like Water for Chocolate including Library Journal, Booklist, and Voice of Youth Advocates.

A Time of Angels has also been reviewed by Publishers Weekly, Kirkus Reviews, People magazine, and North & South magazine.
