= Douglas Wood (naturalist) =

American naturalist

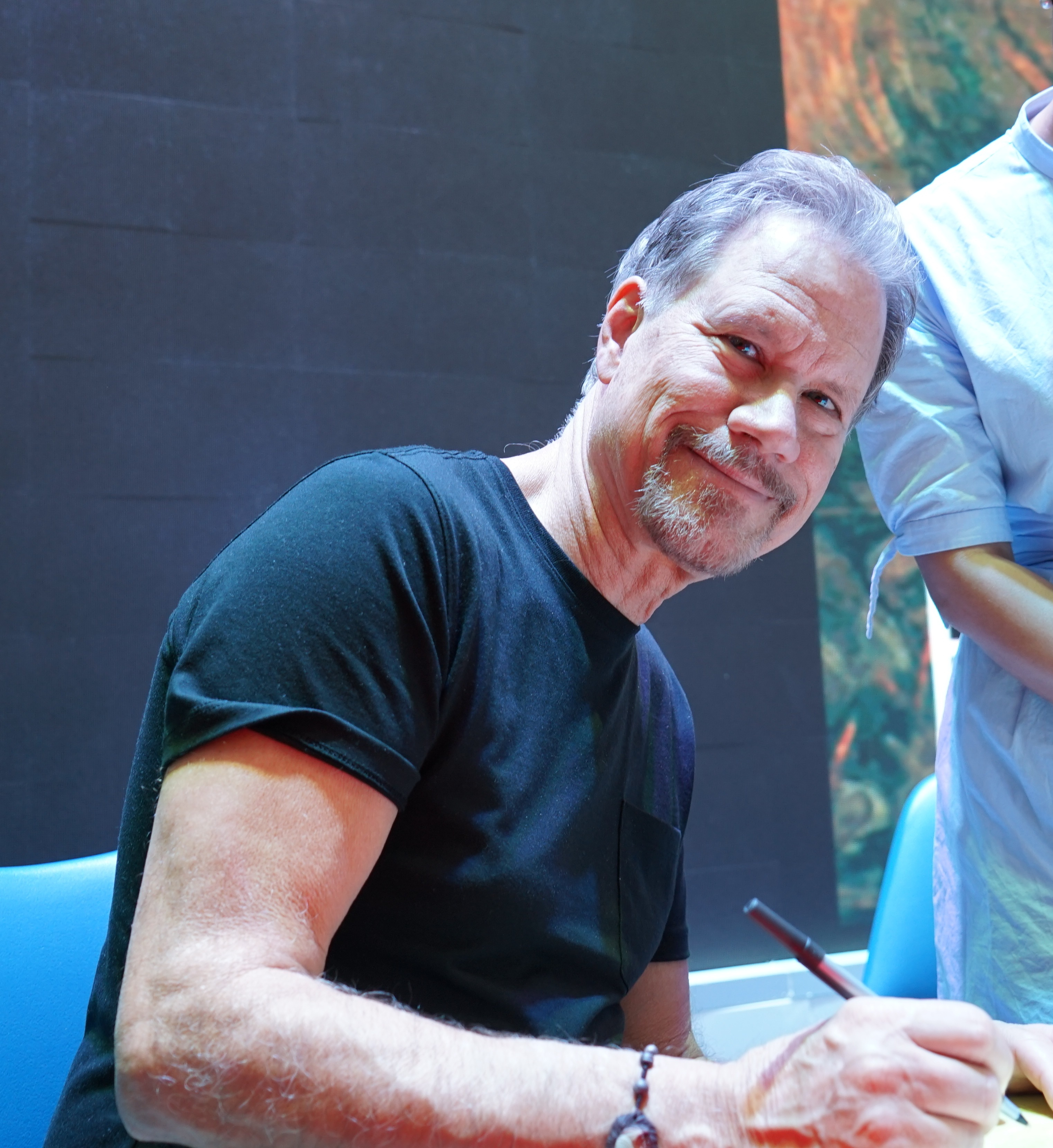
- Born: December 10, 1951 (age 74); New York City
- Education: Morningside College; St Cloud State University
- Occupations: Author, speaker, musician, singer, wilderness guide
- Notable work: Old Turtle; Grandad's Prayers of the Earth; Deep Woods, Wild Waters
- Website: Douglas Wood

Douglas Wood is an American children's author, author, singer, songwriter, speaker, and musician. One of Wood's children's books, Old Turtle and the Broken Truth, won the International Reading Association Book of the Year Award.

== Education ==
Wood received his Bachelors of Music Education Degree from Morningside College in Sioux City, Iowa. Thereafter he completed graduate course studies for a master's degree in psychology from St. Cloud State University, St. Cloud, MN.

== Biography ==
Douglas Wood is an American writer of many books for children and adults, with over two and one half million copies in print. Old Turtle and Grandad's Prayers of the Earth are among his best known works. Among Wood's honors and awards are the Christopher Medal, American Booksellers Book of the Year, International Reading Association Book of the Year, and Parent's Choice Award. His book, Miss Little's Gift, was recognized as a Notable Book by the Smithsonian Institution. Much of Douglas Wood's thematic material comes from a lifelong interest in the outdoors, particularly the relationship between the human spirit and the natural world. In 2011 Douglas Wood narrated the symphonic setting of Old Turtle at the Lincoln Center.

In addition to his work as an author, Douglas Wood is also a musician, who composes and performs music for 12 string guitar, banjo, mandolin, and keyboards. He often performs with his band, WildSpirit. As with his books, much of his music is inspired by the world of nature.

== Public speaking ==
Wood speaks frequently at literary, environmental, and wellness conferences and conventions on the topics wilderness, personal growth, spiritual health, and the outdoors.

He has appeared at the National Wellness Conference, American Booksellers Convention, International Reading Association, Minnesota Naturalist's Association, Association of Interpretive Naturalists, World Wilderness Congress and Midwest Environmental Conference and others.

== Selected books ==
- Douglas, Wood (1992). Old Turtle. Scholastic Press. ISBN 9780439309080.
- Douglas, Wood (1996). The Windigo's Return: A North Woods Story. Simon & Schuster. ISBN 978-0689800658.
- Douglas, Wood (2009). Grandad's Prayers of the Earth. Candlewick. ISBN 978-0763646752.
- Douglas, Wood (2001). Fawn Island. Univ Of Minnesota Press. ISBN 978-0816631759.
- Douglas, Wood (2001). What Moms Can't Do. Simon & Schuster. ISBN 978-0689833588.
- Douglas, Wood (2005). A Quiet Place. Simon & Schuster. ISBN 978-0689876097.
- Douglas, Wood (2003). Old Turtle and the Broken Truth. Scholastic Press. ISBN 978-0439321099.
- Douglas, Wood (2009). Secret of Saying Thanks. Simon & Schuster. ISBN 978-0689854101.
- Douglas, Wood (2017). Miss Little's Gift. Candlewick. ISBN 978-0763698379.
- Douglas, Wood (2010). Where the Sunrise Begins. Simon & Schuste. ISBN 978-0689861727.
- Douglas, Wood (2011). No One But You. Candlewick. ISBN 978-0763638481.
- Douglas, Wood (2013). When a Dad Says I Love You. Simon & Schuster.
- Douglas, Wood (2014). When a Grandpa Says "I Love You. Simon & Schuster. ISBN 978-0689815126.
- Douglas, Wood (2017). Old Turtle: Questions of the Heart. Scholastic Press. ISBN 978-0439321112.
- Douglas, Wood (2017). Deep Woods, Wild Waters: A Memoir. Univ Of Minnesota Press. ISBN 9780816631735.
- Douglas, Wood (2018). Americans. Simon & Schuster. ISBN 978-1416927563.

== Discography ==
Year	Album	Notes
2008	Alive & Pickin'	Release date: September 1, 2008 Genre: Folk Label: Wind in the Pines Publishing
1997	Deep Woods Deep Waters	Release date: May 7, 1997 Genre: New Age Label: Wind in the Pines
1989	Earthsongs	Release date: October 7, 1989 Genre: Folk Label: Wind in the Pines
1983	Solitary Shores: A Tribute to Sigurd F. Olson	Release date: May 1, 1983 Genre: Folk Label: Wind in the Pines Publishing

== Major awards and achievements ==
- 1992: Minnesota Book Award
- 1993: ABBY Award – American Booksellers Book of the Year
- 1993: International Reading Association Book of the Year
- 1994: Who's Who in America, 48th Edition
- 1999: The Christopher Medal
- 2000: Parents Choice Award
- 2009: Alumni Educator of the Year – Morningside College
- 2009: Smithsonian Notable Book
- 2011: Oppenheim Toy Portfolio Best Book Award
- 2013: Lifetime Achievement Award, MN Association for Environmental Ed
