= Gerald McDermott =

American film director, children's writer and illustrator

- Born: January 31, 1941; Detroit, Michigan, U.S.
- Died: December 26, 2012 (aged 71); Los Angeles, California, U.S.
- Occupations: film-maker; fiction writer; mythographer
- Writing career
- Notable work: Anansi the Spider

Gerald McDermott (January 31, 1941 – December 26, 2012) was an American film-maker, creator of children's picture books, and expert on mythology. His creative works typically combine bright colors and styles with ancient imagery. His picture books feature folktales and cultures from all around the world.

== Biography ==
McDermott was born in Detroit, Michigan, to parents who supported the arts and encouraged his love of reading. McDermott began studying art at the age of four, when he started taking Saturday workshops at the Detroit Institute of Arts, the museum in his hometown. There was basic art instruction in the morning and then students were encouraged to sketch from the various collections of the museum.

In elementary and middle school he continued to sketch and paint, acted in a weekly radio program, and he studied ballet as well as music. All of these creative experiences would help McDermott create animated films and books later in life.

McDermott continued his education at Cass Tech, a public high school for the gifted with a notable art program. He also made several short films with his school colleague, Harrison Engle. One of them, "Hello, My Baby!," was filmed at the Detroit Historical Museum. In 1959, he was awarded a National Scholastic Scholarship to the Pratt Institute of Design in New York City. As an extracurricular summer project McDermott decided to produce an animated film and chose The Stonecutter, a story he had loved as a child. McDermott conducted extensive research into the cultures and customs of the story's origins. During his junior year at Pratt in 1962, McDermott took a leave of absence to work as a graphic designer for WNET, a New York educational television channel. He also produced several animated pieces for The Electric Company on PBS. He received his Bachelor of Fine Arts degree from Pratt in 1964.

He produced three more short films soon after graduation: Sunflight in 1966, Anansi the Spider in 1969, and The Magic Tree in 1970. In 1970, George Nicholson, a children's book editor, contacted McDermott and suggested adapting his films as picture books. The first was Anansi the Spider: a tale from the Ashanti, published by Holt, Rinehart, and Winston in 1972. It retells an Ashanti folktale explaining how Anansi was rescued by the separate contributions of his sons. Meanwhile, it explains how the moon came to be in the sky. The Magic Tree, Arrow to the Sun, and Stone-cutter soon followed as picture books. Arrow to the Sun (1974) was developed simultaneously as a film released in 1973, McDermott's last animated film.

In the 1980s he published two books that paid homage to the traditions of his Irish heritage: Daniel O'Rourke and Tim O'Toole and the Wee Folk. During this time he also illustrated some books written by Marianna Mayer. In the early 1990s McDermott began working on a series of trickster tales and two works of mythological creation stories.

McDermott died on December 26, 2012, in Los Angeles, California. He was 71 years old.

== Awards ==
- 1972, Anansi the Spider was a runner-up for the Caldecott Medal
- 1973, Anansi was named to the Lewis Carroll Shelf Award list
- 1974, Arrow to the Sun was the Caldecott Medal-winning U.S. picture book
- 1993, Raven: A Trickster Tale From The Pacific Northwest was a runner-up for both the Caldecott and the Boston Globe–Horn Book Award for picture books
- 1997, Musicians of the Sun received recognition from the American Orff-Schulwerk Association
- 1999, American Orff-Schulwerk Association Advocate

== Books ==
=== As writer and illustrator ===
- 1972 Anansi the Spider: a tale from the Ashanti (Holt, ISBN 0-8050-0311-8)
- 1973 The Magic Tree: a tale from the Congo
- 1974 Arrow to the Sun: a Pueblo Indian tale
- 1975 The Stone-cutter: a Japanese tale
- 1977 The Voyage of Osiris
- 1979 The Knight of the Lion
- 1980 Sunflight
- 1984 Daughter of Earth: a Roman myth
- 1986 Daniel O'Rourke: an Irish tale
- 1990 Tim O'Toole and the Wee Folk: an Irish tale
- 1994 Musicians of the Sun
- 1998 The Fox and the Stork
- 2003 Creation

Trickster tales

- 1980 Papagayo: the mischief maker (a Brazilian folktale)
- 1992 Zomo The Rabbit: A Trickster Tale From West Africa
- 1993 Raven: a trickster tale from the Pacific Northwest
- 1994 Coyote: a trickster tale from the American Southwest
- 2001 Jabuti the Tortoise: a trickster tale from the Amazon
- 2009 Pig-Boy: a trickster tale from Hawai'i
- 2011 Monkey: a trickster tale from India

=== As illustrator ===
- 1981 Carlo Collodi's The Adventures of Pinocchio by Marianna Mayer
- 1985 Alley Oop! by Marianna Mayer
- 1985 Aladdin and the Enchanted Lamp by Marianna Mayer
- 1985 The Spirit of the Blue Light (a German folktale) by Marianna Mayer
- 1987 The Brambleberrys Animal Book of Big & Small Shapes by Marianna Mayer
- 1987 The Brambleberrys Animal Alphabet ABC by Marianna Mayer
- 1987 The Brambleberrys Animal Book of Colors by Marianna Mayer
- 1991 The Brambleberrys Animal Book of Counting by Marianna Mayer
- 1991 Marcel the Pastry Chef by Marianna Mayer
- 2004 Can Turtle fly? : A Lakota tale by Joseph Bruchac

== Films ==
- The Stonecutter, 1960
- Sunflight, 1966
- Anansi the Spider, 1969
- Moments Spent, 1969
- The Magic Tree, 1970
- "Steady Freddy" and "Shall I Shoot the Fish?", 1973 (short films for The Electric Company)
- Arrow to the Sun, 1974
