= Alphabet pasta =

Pasta shaped like alphabet letters

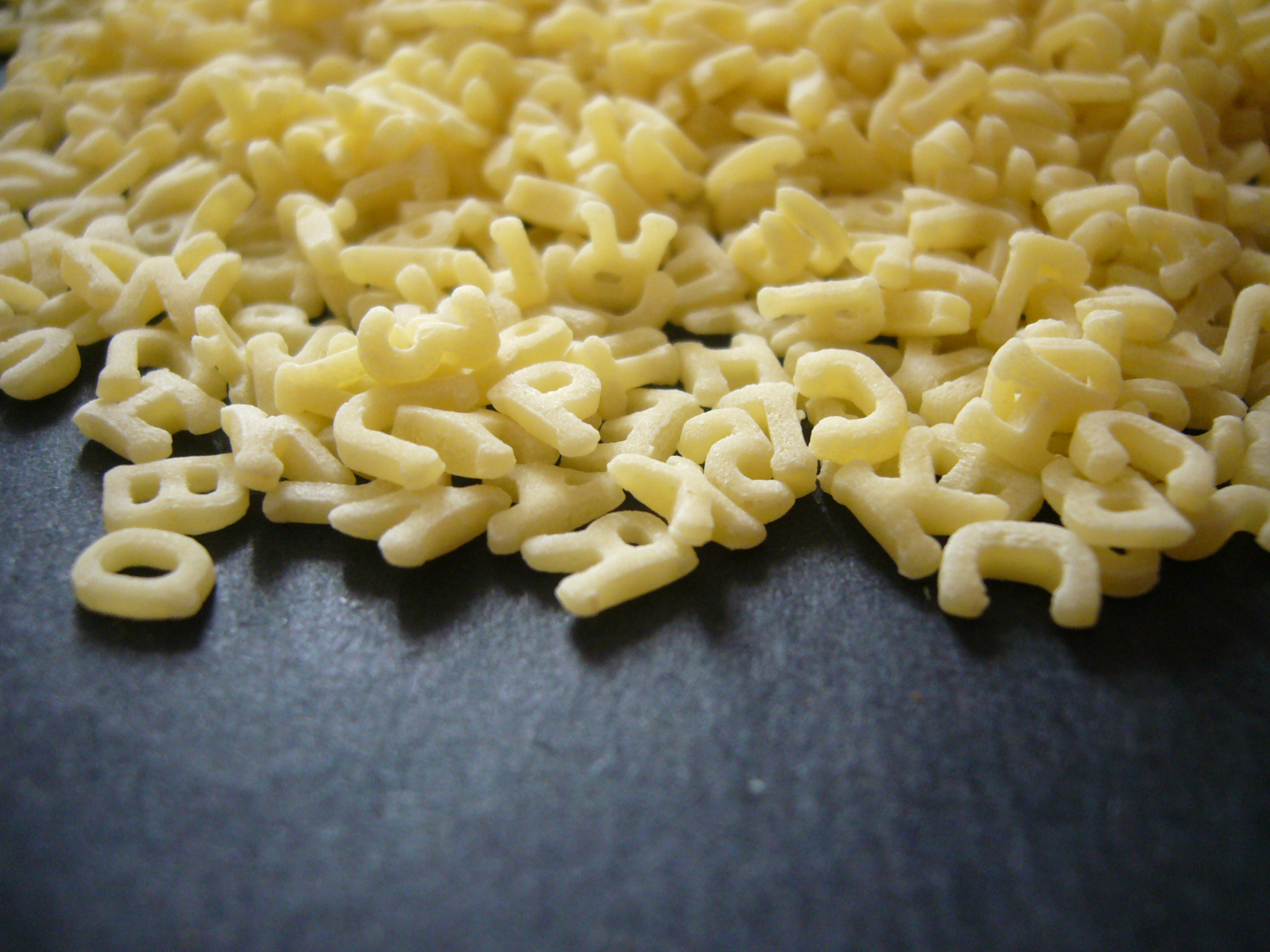
- Alphabet pasta
- Type: Pasta

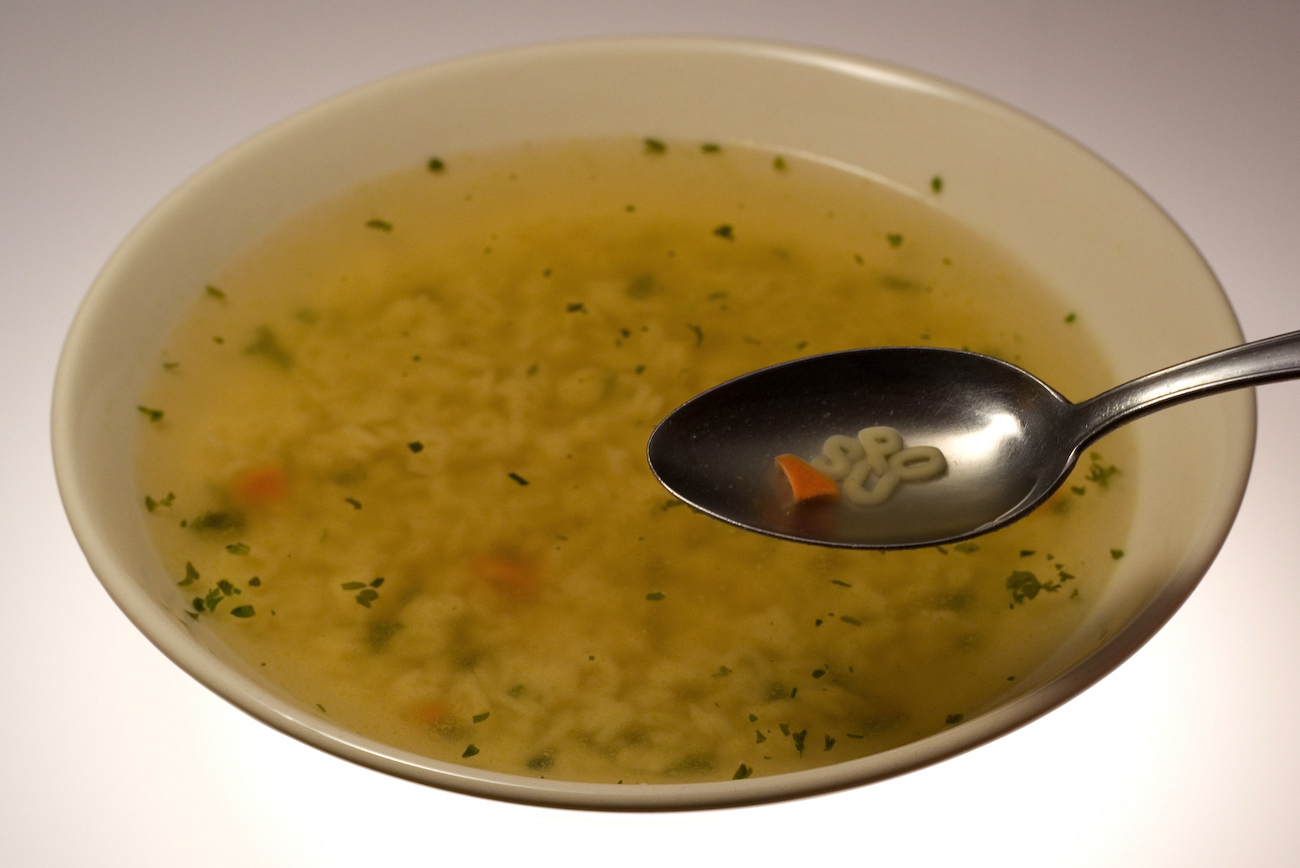
Alphabet soup

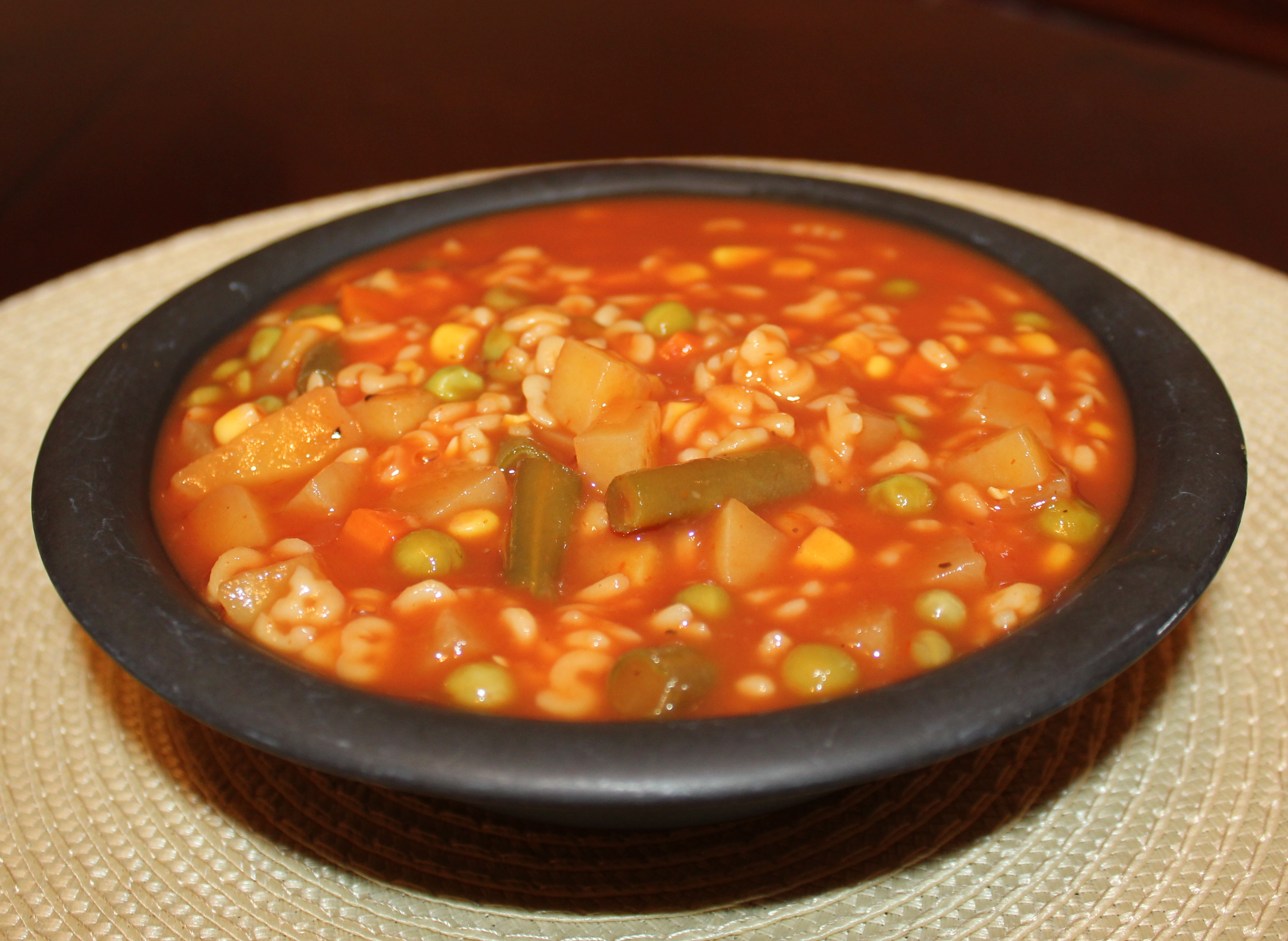
Alphagetti

Alphabet pasta, also referred to as alfabeto and alphabetti spaghetti in the UK, is a pasta that has been mechanically cut or pressed into the shapes of the letters of an alphabet (often the Latin alphabet). It is often served in an alphabet soup, which is also sold in a can of condensed broth or as a packet soup. Another variation, alphagetti, consists of letter-shaped pasta in a marinara or spaghetti sauce.

Small pieces of carrot and some spices are often added to the filling. The noodles are usually up to one centimeter in size and are shaped like the letters A-Z and, more rarely, the numbers 0-9 or the @ sign.

== History ==
It is not clear who invented alphabet soup, when or why. As early as 1877, Paris grocers sold "...small bits of macaroni, for use in soup, which are stamped with... the letters of the alphabet" and Paris restaurants served "...delicious soups made of macaroni or vermicelli cut up into the shape of letters of the alphabet..." In 1883, The Chicago Herald Cooking School cookbook provided a recipe for soup calling for a small pasta such as "alphabet pastes of the same material as macaroni stamped in letters". In January 1900 it was on the menu at New York City's Au Lion d'Or. In 1908, Wilbur Wright was served alphabet soup in Le Mans, France.

Also unclear is whether the soup or the linguistic term for an overabundance of acronyms or abbreviations came first; food historian Janet Clarkson notes that "the first reference I have found so far to the metaphorical alphabet soup also occurs in 1883, in a quotation by the originator of Life magazine, John Ames Mitchell, referring to teaching his son the alphabet soup (the ABCs) of business."

One common American brand of condensed-style alphabet soup is the Campbell's brand, which was founded in 1869. This soup, like its competitors, is marketed towards parents for its educational value.

A similar product, Alphabetti Spaghetti, was sold by the H. J. Heinz Company for 60 years before being discontinued in 1990. Like Campbell's alphabet soup, it contains alphabet pasta canned in tomato sauce. It was later reintroduced by Heinz in 2005.

== See also ==
- Alpha-Bits
- List of pasta
- List of pasta dishes
- SpaghettiOs
