= Martha Speaks (book) =

Children's book published in 1992

- Author: Susan Meddaugh
- Illustrator: Susan Meddaugh
- Series: Martha Speaks
- Genre: Children's picture book
- Publisher: Houghton Mifflin Harcourt
- Publication date: September 1992
- Publication place: United States
- Media type: Paper
- Pages: 32 pp
- Followed by: Martha Calling

Martha Speaks is a children's picture book written and illustrated by Susan Meddaugh and published by Houghton Mifflin in September 1992. It is the first in a series of six books featuring a young girl named Helen Finney and her pet dog named Martha.

== Plot ==
The book follows the adventures of the dog Martha, who can speak after being fed alphabet soup. The family complains about Martha being talkative and she stops eating her soup. When a burglar breaks into the family's house, Martha is unable to call for help. The burglar gives her alphabet soup to keep her quiet and distracted, completely unaware that it gives her the ability to talk. Martha then calls the police and the family appreciates her for speaking again.

== Reception ==
The Horn Book Magazine said the book was "Good-natured and amusing, with cheerful illustrations" and Patricia Tauzer writing for Common Sense Media wrote in a four star (out of five) review that, "the story is clever."

== In popular culture ==
- Prior to an adaptation into a TV series of the same name in 2008, the book was featured on an episode of Reading Rainbow and was also featured (but not read) on an episode of Kino's Storytime.
