= 2003 in literature =

This article contains information about the literary events and publications of 2003.

== Events ==
- February 12 – An invitation from the First Lady of the United States, Laura Bush, for some poets to attend a conference at the White House is postponed when one of them, Sam Hamill, organizes a "Poets Against the War" group for poetry readings across the United States on the same date.
- February 15 – Anti-war protests occur in London. They are later used as the setting for Ian McEwan's 2005 novel Saturday.
- March – The University of Mosul library is damaged and looted during the Iraq War, but many volumes are removed for protection by staff.
- April 14 – The Iraq National Library and Archive is burned down during the Battle of Baghdad.
- April – Nicholas Hytner succeeds Sir Trevor Nunn as artistic director of London's Royal National Theatre.
- November 7 – UNESCO places among the Masterpieces of the Oral and Intangible Heritage of Humanity wayang kulit, a shadow puppet theatre and best known of the Indonesian wayang.

== New books ==
=== Fiction ===
- Peter Ackroyd – The Clerkenwell Tales
- Chimamanda Ngozi Adichie – Purple Hibiscus
- Mitch Albom – The Five People You Meet in Heaven
- Monica Ali – Brick Lane
- Martin Amis – Yellow Dog
- Margaret Atwood – Oryx and Crake
- Paul Auster – Oracle Night
- Max Barry – Jennifer Government
- Greg Bear – Darwin's Children
- Frédéric Beigbeder – Windows on the World
- Hilari Bell – Fall of a Kingdom
- Thomas Berger – Best Friends
- Giles Blunt – The Delicate Storm
- Frank Brennan – Tampering with Asylum
- Dan Brown – The Da Vinci Code
- Angus Peter Campbell – An Oidhche Mus Do Sheol Sinn
- Lars Saabye Christensen – Maskeblomstfamilien
- Paulo Coelho – Eleven Minutes
- J. M. Coetzee – Elizabeth Costello
- Bernard Cornwell
  - Sharpe's Havoc
  - Sharpe's Christmas
  - Heretic
- Douglas Coupland – Hey Nostradamus!
- Robert Crais – The Last Detective
- Julie E. Czerneda – Space, Inc.
- Jeffery Deaver – Twisted
- Don DeLillo – Cosmopolis
- Kate DiCamillo – The Tale of Despereaux
- Cory Doctorow
  - A Place So Foreign and Eight More
  - Down and Out in the Magic Kingdom
- Gerard Donovan – Schopenhauer's Telescope
- Fernanda Eberstadt – The Furies
- Rodrigo Fresán – Jardines de Kensington
- Cornelia Funke – Inkheart
- Anna Gavalda – I Wish Someone Were Waiting for Me Somewhere (translation)
- William Gibson – Pattern Recognition
- Newt Gingrich and William R. Forstchen – Gettysburg: A Novel of the Civil War
- Jean-Christophe Grangé – L'Empire des loups
- John Grisham – The King of Torts
- Margaret Peterson Haddix – Among the Barons
- Mark Haddon – The Curious Incident of the Dog in the Night-Time
- Jennifer Haigh – Mrs. Kimble
- Zoë Heller – Notes on a Scandal
- Khaled Hosseini – The Kite Runner
- Michel Houellebecq – Lanzarote
- Evan Hunter – The Frumious Bandersnatch
- Alan Judd – The Kaiser's Last Kiss
- N. M. Kelby – Theater of the Stars: A Novel of Physics and Memory
- Thomas Keneally – The Tyrant's Novel
- Greg Keyes – The Final Prophecy
- Stephen King – Wolves of the Calla
- Dean R. Koontz
  - The Face
  - Odd Thomas
- Jhumpa Lahiri – The Namesake
- Dennis Lehane – Shutter Island
- Jonathan Lethem – The Fortress of Solitude
- James Luceno – The Unifying Force
- Steve Martini – The Arraignment
- Magnus Mills – The Scheme for Full Employment
- Paul Murray – An Evening of Long Goodbyes
- Julie Myerson – Something Might Happen
- Andrew Neiderman – The Baby Squad
- Audrey Niffenegger – The Time Traveler's Wife
- Garth Nix – Mister Monday
- Chuck Palahniuk – Diary
- Christopher Paolini – Eragon
- Carolyn Parkhurst – The Dogs of Babel
- Per Petterson – Out Stealing Horses (Ut og stjæle hester)
- DBC Pierre – Vernon God Little
- Terry Pratchett
  - Monstrous Regiment
  - The Wee Free Men
- Jean Raspail – Les Royaumes de Borée
- Matthew Reilly – Scarecrow
- Nina Revoyr – Southland
- Tom Robbins – Villa Incognito
- J. Jill Robinson – Residual Desire
- Nick Sagan – Idlewild
- Matthew Sharpe – The Sleeping Father
- Wilbur Smith – Blue Horizon
- Olen Steinhauer – The Bridge of Sighs
- Neal Stephenson – Quicksilver (Vol. I of the Baroque Cycle)
- Matthew Stover – Shatterpoint
- Jonathan Stroud – The Amulet of Samarkand
- Anthony Swofford – Jarhead
- Miguel Sousa Tavares – Equador
- Adam Thirlwell – Politics
- Akira Toriyama (鳥山 明) – Toccio the Angel (Tenshi no Tocchio)
- Sergio Troncoso – The Nature of Truth
- Andrew Vachss – The Getaway Man
- Mario Vargas Llosa – The Way to Paradise (El paraíso en la otra esquina)
- Jo Walton – Tooth and Claw
- Irvine Welsh – Porno
- Tobias Wolff – Old School
- Roger Zelazny – Manna from Heaven (short stories)

=== Children and young people ===
- David Almond – The Fire-Eaters
- Atsuko Asano – No. 6 (あさの あつこ)
- Cressida Cowell – How to Train Your Dragon (first in the eponymous series of 16 books)
- Madonna - The English Roses
- Elizabeth Laird – The Garbage King
- Jim Murphy – An American Plague: the true and terrifying story of the yellow fever epidemic of 1793
- Jenny Nimmo – Charlie Bone and the Time Twister
- Tyne O'Connell – Pulling Princes
- Philip Reeve – Predator's Gold
- J. K. Rowling – Harry Potter and the Order of the Phoenix
- Lemony Snicket – The Slippery Slope
- Dugald Steer (with Helen Ward, Wayne Anderson, etc.) – Dragonology: The Complete Book of Dragons
- Mo Willems - Don't Let the Pigeon Drive the Bus! (first in a series of 8 books)
- Ann Turnbull – No Shame, No Fear
- Kay Winters (with Barry Moser) – Voices of Ancient Egypt
- Yang Hongying (楊紅櫻) – Four Troublemakers (四个调皮蛋, first in the Mo's Mischief – 淘气包马小跳 – series of 8 books)
- Peter H. Reynolds - The Dot

=== Drama ===
- Jordi Galceran – El mètode Grönholm (The Grönholm method)
- Richard Greenberg – The Violet Hour
- David Hare – The Permanent Way
- Kwame Kwei-Armah – Elmina's Kitchen
- Lynn Nottage – Intimate Apparel
- Mark O'Rowe – Crestfall
- Abhi Subedi – Agniko Katha

=== Poetry ===
- Lavinia Greenlaw – Minsk
- Pope John Paul II – Roman Triptych. Meditations
- Dean Kalimniou – Kipos Esokleistos

=== Non–fiction ===
- Banglapedia – National Encyclopedia of Bangladesh
- Neal Bascomb – Higher: A Historic Race to the Sky and the Making of a City
- Patricia Brown – A League Of My Own: Memoir of a Pitcher for the All-American Girls
- Andrea Curtis – Into the Blue
- Richard Dawkins – A Devil's Chaplain: Reflections on Hope, Lies, Science, and Love
- Gerina Dunwich – Dunwich's Guide to Gemstone Sorcery
- Jerry A. Eichenberger – Your Pilot's License
- Marc Ferro – Le Livre noir du colonialisme
- John Fowles – The Journals – Volume 1
- Anna Funder – Stasiland
- Mattias Gardell – Gods of the Blood
- A. C. Grayling – What Is Good?: The Search for the Best Way to Live
- Christopher Hitchens – A Long Short War: The Postponed Liberation of Iraq
- Erik Larson – The Devil in the White City: Murder, Magic, and Madness at the Fair That Changed America
- Bethany McLean – The Smartest Guys in the Room
- Don Miller – Blue Like Jazz
- Michael Moore – Dude, Where's My Country?
- Azar Nafisi – Reading Lolita in Tehran
- Alanna Nash – The Colonel: The Extraordinary Story of Colonel Tom Parker and Elvis Presley
- Daniel Okrent – Great Fortune: The Epic of Rockefeller Center
- Chuck Palahniuk – Fugitives and Refugees: A Walk in Portland, Oregon
- Rudy Ruiz – ¡ADELANTE!: una guía personal del éxito para usted y su familia (a guide for success for immigrants)
- Jane Smiley – Charles Dickens
- Clark Ashton Smith – Selected Letters of Clark Ashton Smith
- David Starkey – Six Wives: The Queens of Henry VIII
- Lynne McTaggart – The Field: The Quest for the Secret Force of the Universe
- Amy Tan – The Opposite of Fate: A Book of Musings
- Lynne Truss – Eats, Shoots & Leaves
- Penny Wolfson – Moonrise

== Films ==
- The Lord of the Rings: The Return of the King

== Deaths ==
- January 5 – Jean Kerr, American author and playwright (born 1923)
- January 21 – Paul Haines, American-born Canadian poet and songwriter (born 1933)
- February 16 – Aleksandar Tišma, Serbian novelist (born 1924)
- February 26 – Quentin Keynes, English explorer, writer and filmmaker (born 1921)
- March 11 – Brian Cleeve, English-born Irish writer and broadcaster (born 1921)
- March 12 – Howard Fast, American novelist (born 1914)
- March 14 – Lucian Boz, Romanian and Australian literary critic (born 1908)
- April 3 – Michael Kelly, American journalist (born 1957)
- April 7 – Cecile de Brunhoff, French children's writer (born 1903)
- June 21
  - George Axelrod, American dramatist and screenwriter (born 1922)
  - Leon Uris, American novelist (born 1924)
- July 6 – Kathleen Raine, English poet, scholar, and translator (born 1908)
- July 10 – Winston Graham, English novelist (born 1908)
- July 14 – Éva Janikovszky, Hungarian novelist and children's writer (born 1926)
- July 15 – Roberto Bolaño, Chilean-born fiction writer (born 1953)
- July 16 – Carol Shields, American-born Canadian novelist (breast cancer; born 1935)
- September 3 – Alan Dugan, American poet (born 1923)
- September 12 – Profira Sadoveanu, Romanian journalist, memoirist, biographer, editor and translator (born 1906)
- September 24 – Derek Prince, English biblical scholar, author and radio presenter (born 1915)
- September 25 – Edward Said, Palestinian-American literary critic (born 1935)
- November 9 – Alan Davidson, Northern Irish historian and food writer (born 1924)
- December 3 – Sita Ram Goel, Indian historian, publisher and author (born 1921)
- December 11 – Ahmadou Kourouma, Ivorian writer (born 1927)
- December 12 – Fadwa Toukan, Palestinian poet (born 1917)

== Awards ==
- Nobel Prize in Literature: J. M. Coetzee

=== Australia ===
- The Australian/Vogel Literary Award: Nicholas Angel, Drown Them in the Sea
- C. J. Dennis Prize for Poetry: Emma Lew, Anything the Landlord Touches
- Kenneth Slessor Prize for Poetry: Jill Jones, Screens Jets Heaven
- Miles Franklin Award: Alex Miller, Journey to the Stone Country

=== Canada ===
- Giller Prize: M. G. Vassanji – The In-Between World of Vikram Lall
- See 2003 Governor General's Awards for a complete list of the winners of those awards.
- Griffin Poetry Prize: Margaret Avison, Concrete and Wild Carrot and Paul Muldoon, Moy sand and gravel
- Edna Staebler Award for Creative Non-Fiction: Alison Watt, The Last Island

=== Sweden ===
- Astrid Lindgren Memorial Award: Maurice Sendak and Christine Nöstlinger

=== United Kingdom ===
- Booker Prize: DBC Pierre, Vernon God Little
- Caine Prize for African Writing: Yvonne Adhiambo Owuor, "Weight of Whispers"
- Carnegie Medal for children's literature: Jennifer Donnelly, A Gathering Light
- Cholmondeley Award: Ciarán Carson, Michael Donaghy, Lavinia Greenlaw, Jackie Kay
- David Cohen Prize: Beryl Bainbridge, Thom Gunn
- Eric Gregory Award: Jen Hadfield, Zoë Brigley, Paul Batchelor, Olivia Cole, Sasha Dugdale, Anna Woodford
- James Tait Black Memorial Prize for biography: Janet Browne, Charles Darwin: Volume 2 – The Power of Place
- James Tait Black Memorial Prize for fiction: Andrew O'Hagan, Personality
- Orange Prize for Fiction: Valerie Martin, Property
- Queen's Gold Medal for Poetry: U. A. Fanthorpe
- Whitbread Book of The Year Award: Mark Haddon, The Curious Incident of the Dog in the Night-Time: A Novel

=== United States ===
- Agnes Lynch Starrett Poetry Prize: David Shumate, High Water Mark
- American Academy of Arts and Letters Gold Medal in Poetry: W. S. Merwin
- Bernard F. Connors Prize for Poetry: Julie Sheehan, "Brown-headed Cow Birds"
- Bollingen Prize for Poetry: Adrienne Rich
- Brittingham Prize in Poetry: Brian Teare, The Room Where I Was Born
- Compton Crook Award: Patricia Bray, Devlin's Luck
- Frost Medal: Lawrence Ferlinghetti
- Hugo Award: Robert J. Sawyer, Hominids
- Lambda Literary Awards: Multiple categories; see 2003 Lambda Literary Awards
- National Book Award for Fiction: Shirley Hazzard, The Great Fire
- National Book Critics Circle Award: Edward P. Jones, The Known World
- Newbery Medal for children's literature: Avi, Crispin: The Cross of Lead
- PEN/Faulkner Award for Fiction: Sabina Murray, The Caprices
- Pulitzer Prize for Fiction: Jeffrey Eugenides, Middlesex
- Wallace Stevens Award: Richard Wilbur
- Whiting Awards:

Fiction: Courtney Angela Brkic (fiction/nonfiction), Alexander Chee, Agymah Kamau, Ann Pancake, Lewis Robinson, Jess Row
Nonfiction: Christopher Cokinos, Trudy Dittmar
Plays: Sarah Ruhl
Poetry: Major Jackson

=== Other ===
- Camões Prize: Rubem Fonseca
- Friedenspreis des Deutschen Buchhandels: Susan Sontag
- International Dublin Literary Award: Orhan Pamuk My Name is Red
- Premio Nadal: Andrés Trapiello, Los amigos del crimen perfecto
- SAARC Literary Award: Tissa Abeysekara, Laxman Gaikwad

== See also ==
- 2003 in comics
- 2003 in Australian literature

== Notes ==
- Hahn, Daniel (2015). The Oxford Companion to Children's Literature (2nd ed.). Oxford. University Press. ISBN 9780198715542.
