= Kelby (name) =

Kelby is both a surname and a given name. Notable people with the name include:

Surname

- N. M. Kelby, American short-story and novel writer

Given name

- Kelby Guilfoyle, writer
- Kelby Tomlinson (born 1990), American baseball player
- Kelby Woodard (born 1970), American politician
