= Matthew Sharpe =

Matthew Sharpe may refer to:

- Matthew Sharpe (writer), American novelist and short story writer
- Matthew Sharpe (British Army officer), Scottish politician and British Army officer
- Matthew Sharpe (triathlete), Canadian triathlete

== See also ==
- Matt Sharp, American songwriter and musician
