= Kalymnios =

Kalymnios is a Greek surname Καλυμνιός. Notable people with the surname include:

- Alex Kalymnios, English director, producer, and screenwriter
- Konstantinos Kalymnios (born 1977), Australian lawyer, writer of Greek descent

== See also ==
- Kalymnos, a Greek island
