= Rise of a Hero =

2005 novel by Hilari Bell

- First edition
- Author: Hilari Bell
- Cover artist: Steve Stone
- Language: English
- Series: Farsala trilogy
- Genre: Fantasy novel
- Publisher: Simon & Schuster
- Publication date: May 2005
- Publication place: United States
- Media type: Print (Hardback & Paperback)
- Pages: 480 pp (first edition, hardback)
- ISBN: 978-0-689-85415-6 (first edition, hardback)
- OCLC: 54407730
- LC Class: PZ7.B38894 Ris 2005
- Preceded by: Fall of a Kingdom
- Followed by: Forging the Sword

Rise of a Hero is the 2005 fantasy novel which comprises the second book in the Farsala Trilogy by Hilari Bell.

== Plot summary ==
Legend has it that when Farsala most needs a warrior to lead it, Sorahb son of Rostam will be restored by the god Azura. That time has come. After a devastating loss to the army of the Hrum, Farsala has all but fallen. Only the walled city of Mazad and a few of the more uninhabitable regions remain free of Hrum rule, and they seem destined to fall as well. Farsala needs a champion now. Soraya risks being a slave herself to save her little brother and her mother, who are currently in the Hrum slave pens. Kavi has second thoughts about helping the Hrum and switches sides. But Jiaan and Soraya still hate Kavi for his betrayal of Farsala and are furious when the three are re-united.

== Literary significance & criticism ==
A number of reviews for this second novel have praised the work:

"The tangible, if not excessively gritty, realness of the world and its conflicts denies any simple good vs. evil binary"

"Rise of a Hero is an ambitious, tightly written and highly intelligent fantasy"
