= The Wizard Test =

2005 novel by Hilari Bell

- First edition (publ. HarperCollins)
- Author: Hilari Bell
- Cover artist: Carl Nielsen
- Publisher: HarperCollins
- Publication date: March 1, 2005
- ISBN: 978-0-06-059942-3

The Wizard Test is a children's fantasy novel by Hilari Bell. It was first published in 2005. The tagline of the novel is "Honor used to seem so clear to Dayven. Now it had faded into shades of gray. Like a wizard's robe."

== Plot summary ==
Dayven is a watcherlad who wants to become a Guardian. He definitely does not want to become a wizard, regarding them as deceitful and disloyal. When he is sent to the wizards to take the wizard test, he hopes to fail. Instead, he finds he has a gift for magic. Dayven refuses to acknowledge his power and later his cousin Soren tells him that the Lordowner, Lord Enar, wants to see him. Lord Enar asks what he thinks about wizards and Dayven says how much he hates them. Lord Enar agrees about Dayven's opinion of wizards and asks if he wants to spy on the wizards and Dayven agrees.

One of the wizards, Sundar, gives Dayven money to bail a wizard, Reddick, out of jail. Reddick wants Dayven to go with him to spy on the Cenzar. On their journey they come across a dry stream and after some investigation help the villagers solve the problem. As the journey continues they reach the city of the Cenzar. In the city Reddick takes Dayven to the zondar, or training school for soldiers.

As he becomes entrenched in the war, Dayven comes to a discomforting realization that there is no just two sides to a battle, just as there is not just black or white. He befriends a boy on the other side of the war, and during the war, he works as a healer in the surgeon's tent. In the end, when he sees his friend hurt, he heals him, at the cost of losing everything he had dreamed to be. Dayven realizes the flaws of his people. The Cenzar used to only farm three fields out of four at a time. This way the land had a full year to regain its minerals and nutrients. When the Cenzar lost their land this rule was viewed as laziness and ignored. If Dayven's people continue to have their way, they will make the land infertile and then move to somewhere new as they have done countless times before. Dayven uses spells to make sure that the Cenzar win the battle. He stays behind when his people are forced to move on.

== Themes ==
According to School Library Journal's Sharon Grover, The Wizard Test explores the following themes: "What is loyalty and to whom is it owed? Are our enemies truly as evil as we are taught? Do our leaders really do what is best, or what is expedient? And how can we determine the truth?"

== Reception ==
The Wizard Test received mixed reviews from critics.

According to Publishers Weekly, The Wizard Test is "well-intentioned but thin fare". School Library Journal's Sharon Grover found that the "slim book" asks and answers "hard questions", and will "spark much discussion". Booklist's Jennifer Mattson highlighted the novel's "clarity and brevity", which may make it more accessible to some readers. Mattson further wrote, "Although Dayven's ideological shift is more an about-face than a natural evolution, there is satisfaction to be gleaned from the parallels to real-world collisions between heedless, exploitative conquerors and native peoples whose ways are as misunderstood as they are reviled".

Kirkus Reviews noted that "action takes a back seat to Dayven’s internal struggles".

Multiple reviewers commented on the novel's characters, with Publishers Weekly noting that they're "not as well-rounded as the author's previous cast". According to Kirkus Reviews, "Reddick, who turns out to be much more than the wisecracking drunk he seems at first to be, is the most memorable character".
