= The Goblin Gate =

2010 novel by Hilari Bell

- First edition
- Author: Hilari Bell
- Cover artist: Cliff Nielsen
- Language: English
- Genre: Fantasy novel
- Publisher: HarperTeen
- Publication date: October 11, 2010
- Publication place: United States
- Media type: Print
- Pages: 384
- ISBN: 978-0-06-165102-1
- Preceded by: The Goblin Wood
- Followed by: The Goblin War

The Goblin Gate (2010) is a young adult fantasy novel by Hilari Bell, a sequel to her novel The Goblin Wood.

The story picks up immediately after the end of the previous novel with young knight Jeriah trying to save his older brother Tobin from the goblins and the hedgewitch Makenna. After Tobin escorts Makenna to the Otherworld Jeriah learns his brother will soon die due to the magical nature of the world he has fled to. To bring back his brother Jeriah is quickly involved in the complex politics and conspiracies of the Realm.

According to Kirkus Reviews, the novel's "suspense is almost painful". Additionally, Sharon Grover, writing for School Library Journal, found that the novel did a good job exploring "the nuances of politics and the nature of good and evil", highlighting how, "through Jeriah's eyes, readers learn that immense wrongs are often committed to achieve a greater good".
