= Farsala Trilogy =

Series of fantasy novels by Hilari Bell

The Farsala Trilogy is a series of three fantasy novels by Hilari Bell that includes Fall of a Kingdom (also published as Flame) (2003), Rise of a Hero (2005), and Forging the Sword (2006). The series is loosely based on the legend Rostam and Sohrab in the Persian epic Shahnameh.

== Main characters ==
These are the main characters that appear in all of the three books:

- Jiaan: A "half-breed" boy, son of Farsala's commander and a peasant woman. Jiaan eventually becomes the commander of Farsala and saves Farsala from falling, contrary to the title of the book. After serving in his father's command for several years Jiaan rides into battle and watches his father die. Torn with grief Jiaan then promises himself that he will find the person responsible for killing him. (18 years old, curly, brown hair and brown eyes)
- Soraya: A girl of deghan nobility. She is also the child of the Commander, Merahb, but refuses to admit the blood relationship between her and Jiaan. She was used to getting what she wants until the second book. Although she is a bit temperamental, Soraya changes her ways when she gets sent to live in the Suud desert and befriends the Suud. There Soraya learns the secrets of magic and learns from the Suud, All Speaker. When Soraya learns that her father is dead she sets out to save the rest of her family. Living as a kitchen girl for a while Soraya then gets caught trying to steal precious documents. (15 years old, straight black hair and black eyes)
- Kavi: a young peddler. He has a deep resentment for the deghans as they had caused him to lose use of his right hand. This caused him to lose his trade of smithing, and thus becomes a peddler. It was while selling fake goods that he met Soraya and Jiaan. Kavi gets captured by the enemy and tries to escape. But he changes his mind when he learns the enemy of his country are the enemies of the nobility, not the peasantry. He therefore then spies for the enemy. After the battle, Kavi has a change of heart and seeks to save the deghans from a life of slavery. (20 years old, curly light brown hair and brown eyes)
- Garren: Farsala's invading enemy commander. This man is caught in a political struggle with his nation, as his father is a senator in the empire. His father had boasted that Garren could use ten thousand men to conquer the mighty army of Farsala, so as to let the other members of the senate allow Garren be the commander, thus he was put at a severe disadvantage and eventually fell.
- Patrius: One of the enemy deputy commanders, and a kind man. Initially he is in charge of Kavi when the peddler decides to become a spy. Throughout the series, he is shown to believe in the empire, and is one of the people that goes against Garren's unjust ways. When captured by Jiaan in the third book, he did not show hatred as an ordinary man might do, but instead decided to assist him.
- Duckie: Kavi's faithful but stubborn mule. Kavi bought Duckie off another peddler when he was starting out. The mule is shown to enjoy the company of ducks, and vice versa, thus getting her the name of "Duckie". Duckie is quite valuable to saving Farsala.

== Plot ==
The story switches between three main characters, Jiaan, Soraya and Kavi, and Farsala's history. There is war happening in Farsala, against the mighty Hrum empire.

Jiaan: Jiaan is half blood, as his father is the commander of Farsala's army, and his mother a peasant woman. He is half brother to Soraya, although she does not acknowledge him as a brother. Jiann serves as his father's aide, taking notes during meetings and being kind of an apprentice. Jiann is traveling with his father and a band of deghans to find a secure flat terrain to fight the Hrum. Most of the book, he suffers rude comments and disrespect from the deghans about his half-blood. When the first battle occurs, Jiann is chosen to carry the banner behind the commander, a very honorable position. However, during the battle, he tries to help his father, the commander, fight, but ends up being knocked to the ground and nearly trampled. He watches as the commander, to end the battle, decides to fight against one other warrior in a duel to see who will win the battle. If the commander won the duel, his own army would win the battle. If his opponent won, then their side would win. Instead, the Hrum send a barrage of arrows towards the commander, and kill him that way instead. Jiann is overcome with grief at his father's death, and takes command of the army.

Soraya: Soraya is very stuck-up, and selfish. She does, however, have a nicer side. She is her father's, the commander, favorite child. She is half sister to Jiann, although she does not acknowledge that. Her father's priests are bribed by someone who wants to be commander, to say that the commander must sacrifice her to win the war. The commander fakes the sacrifice and sends her into hiding with a family on the country side. She is disdainful at first, but soon begins to lend a hand to putting food on the table. She hunts for the family, when one night she gets chased by jackals, and is saved by a tribe called the Suud. The lady who saved her, Maok, teaches her "magic" or how to speak to spirits of things like fire and water, trees and animals. She leaves the tribe after a month or two and returns to the countryside family to the news of her father's death. She vows to find the rest of her family and avenge her father.

Kavi: Kavi's story is short. He used to be an apprentice smith, but due to an "accident" with a deghan, he loses the use of his hand and becomes a peddler selling minor smith goods. On his journey he is caught by the commander when he tries to sell a fake gold bracelet (bronze bracelet coated in gold), and is made to promise to check on Soraya on the countryside and report back to him. He is then caught by the Hrum, he learns about then and eventually acts as a spy for them. Kavi is indirectly the cause of the commanders death because he betrays the Farsalan army's plan to the Hrum. He is bitter towards the deghans and wishes them overthrown. When Kavi realizes that the deghans do not deserve to become slaves, and that not all Hrum are as good as they claim to be, he has a change of heart and becomes one of the main leaders of the resistance.

== Legend of Sorahb ==
A main part of the Farsala Trilogy is the legend of Sorahb which is told between each set of chapters. Despite artistic licensing, the part of the legend told in first book is clearly based on the legend Rostam and Sohrab in the Persian epic Shahnameh. In the next two books the legend develops to follow the plot of the story. Through the legend, the readers get two accounts of what happened in Farsala, what happens to the main characters and what people are told for generations to come.

== Location ==
The Farsala trilogy is set in a fantasy world, although there is a town in southern Thessaly, in Greece, with same name.

The country in which the trilogy takes place is called Farsala, a land with diverse physical features, from swamps to deserts. Farsala is in-between the newly taken over country of Sendar to the West and the war torn country of Kadesh to the East, with the ocean covering all of its southern border and the desert, or badlands, covering its northern one. Farsala is ruled by the Gahn (or King) and the twelve deghan (noble) houses, each represented by an animal.

Hrum, though not a location any of the action takes place in, is an important country to the plot of the story. The Hrum are the invaders who seek to conquer Farsala, and add more land to their empire. The Hrum seem to be loosely based on the Roman empire.

== Books ==
- Fall of a Kingdom (2003)
- Rise of a Hero (2005)
- Forging the Sword (2006)
