= Panepirotic Federation of Australia =

The Panepirotic Federation of Australia (Greek: Πανηπειρωτική Ομοσπονδία Αυστραλίας) was founded in 1982 as a federation of various organisations representing migrants who originated from the region of Epirus, throughout Australia. It is known for its dedication to the maintenance and development of Epirotic culture in Australia, its passionate championing of the rights of the Greek minority of Northern Epirus and plays a prominent role in the life of the Greek community in Australia. It has donated over one million dollars to works of a charitable and philanthropic nature for the Greeks of Northern Epirus. It is also affiliated with the World Council of Epirotes Abroad and the World Council of Hellenes Abroad.

The Panepirotic Federation of Australia's former president, Petros Petranis, has completed a study of Epirotic migration to Australia, which is entitled "Epirots in Australia" (Greek: Οι Ηπειρώτες στην Αυστραλία), published by the National Centre for Hellenic Studies, La Trobe University, in 2004.

The Federation maintains a website, and a Facebook group, and also hosts a Melbourne Radio program on 3xy Radio Hellas 1422 AM every Wednesday between 9-10pm, presented by Dimitrios Varnas and Konstantinos Kalymnios.

== Member organisations ==
- Union of Northern Epirotes.
- Konitsa Association of Melbourne
- Cultural League of Epirus
- Youth League of Epirus
- Committee of Solidarity for the Greeks of Northern Epirus
