= The Goblin Wood =

2003 novel by Hilari Bell

- First edition
- Author: Hilari Bell
- Cover artist: Eric Bowman
- Language: English
- Genre: Fantasy novel
- Publisher: Eos
- Publication date: April 2003
- Publication place: United States
- Media type: Print (hardback & paperback)
- Pages: 304 pp (first edition, hardback)
- ISBN: 978-0-06-051371-9 (first edition, hardback)
- OCLC: 50767753
- LC Class: PZ7.B38894 Go 2003
- Followed by: The Goblin Gate

The Goblin Wood is a 2003 teen fantasy novel by Hilari Bell. The American Library Association named it a best book for young adults and a "popular paperback" for young adults in 2004.

== Plot ==
Makenna is a hedgewitch. Her mother is killed when a new priest is sent to town. Makenna flees for her life, and tries to flood the town in revenge. She flees to the woods and is teased by a group of goblins. Soon, she catches one goblin named Cogswhallop. She spares his life, and in return he convinces the other goblins to stop taunting her. Makenna later meets a friendly trader in the woods who tells her that the priesthood is working to eliminate all sources of magic they consider to not come from divine sources, including goblins and hedgewitches. Cogswhallop and his friends ask for Makenna's help to rescue a small goblin family from being burned to death by a priest. Makenna helps the goblins, and they form an alliance to help goblins and find a safe place to live.

One night, Tobin, a young knight, finds his brother fleeing from the guards to help the rebels. Tobin assists his brother but is caught and branded as a traitor. To save his name and family, Tobin accepts a mission to rid the northern lands of goblins to make space for settlers who have lost their land to the barbarians in the south. Tobin sets off for the far village to the north to take on the goblins and their leader, a "sorceress." In a northern town, Tobin meets a priest of the Bright Ones, who informs him of his mission, to seek out the goblin lair and plant the Otherworld stone near the sorceress's headquarters, allowing them to spy on her. Tobin sets out to find the lair but is caught by the goblins and taken to their village. While trying to escape, he drops the stone.

In the Goblin village, Tobin is chained to a post in a small jail. He watches and learns the customs of the goblins and sees they are not so different from human children. Makenna (the "sorceress") sits with him one day and performs a spell to learn what information he has. Makenna tells Tobin that she's only a hedgewitch. Tobin is released from prison to walk around the village with the children. He meets many goblins and becomes a familiar face in the village. That night, the village is raided by knights from the human town where Tobin met the priest. They had found the village using the Otherworld stone Tobin dropped. The town is soon overtaken, but Tobin helps many of the goblins escape.

Makenna sneaks into the human village to live as a servant with a family, who accept her after she saves a seven-year-old from choking to death. She flees that night and reunites with the goblins, and they plan their attack. The next night, Tobin and the goblins try to sneak into the village, but he is caught while trying to steal the priest's spell books from his tent. Makenna saves him and they flee with the books, hoping to lead the goblins to a new world.

Makenna, Tobin, and the goblins shelter together as Makenna, using a magical wall, performs a spell that opens a portal into a new world. As the army comes over the hill, the goblins, Makenna, and Tobin disappear into the portal, never to be heard from again. Cogswhallop and some other goblins stay behind to keep fighting the humans.
