= Schopenhauer's Telescope =

Novel by Gerard Donovan (2003)

- Author: Gerard Donovan
- Language: English
- Publisher: Counterpoint Press
- Publication date: June 2003
- Publication place: Ireland
- Pages: 296
- ISBN: 1582432236

Schopenhauer's Telescope is the debut novel of Irish novelist and poet Gerard Donovan. Published in 2003, the book received general acclaim, appearing on the long list for the Man Booker Prize and garnering the Kerry Group Irish Fiction Award the following year. In 2005, the novel was long-listed for the International Dublin Literary Award.

== Plot ==
The novel takes place in an unnamed 20th-century European town. The narrator, known only as the Baker, is digging a hole while another man, the History Teacher, watches. Gradually it becomes clear that the hole is to be a mass grave for the villagers gathered nearby under the guard of a group of soldiers.

The novel focuses mainly on the conversations between the baker and the history teacher while the grave is being dug. Topics include Genghis Khan, the Battle of Little Bighorn, Sun Tzu's The Art of War, and the bombing of Dresden.

After the hole is finished, it is revealed that the History Teacher has elected to be the first man shot, so that he does not have to see the others die. The Baker is allowed to live.

== Reception ==
Isobel Montgomery of The Guardian gave Schopenhauer's Telescope a positive review, writing, "Donovan's ear for dialogue and his sense of pace make it impossible to forget that this discussion [between the Baker and the Teacher] has a deadly serious purpose."

A book reviewer for the Irish Independent wrote, "When I read Schopenhauer's Telescope, it took my breath away with its elegance and intelligence and the profundity of its emotional compass."
