= Frank Brennan (priest) =

Australian priest, lawyer and human rights advocate

The Reverend Frank Brennan SJ AO
- Born: Frank Tenison Brennan; Toowoomba, Queensland, Australia
- Occupations: Priest, lawyer, academic
- Known for: Human rights activism
- Parent(s): Gerard Brennan; Patricia O'Hara

Frank Tenison Brennan SJ AO is an Australian Jesuit priest, human rights lawyer and academic. He has a longstanding reputation of advocacy in the areas of law, social justice, refugee protection, reconciliation and human rights activism.

== Early life and education ==
Brennan is the first born son of Sir Gerard Brennan, a former chief justice of the High Court of Australia, and Patricia O'Hara, an anaesthetist. He is a fourth generation Australian and is of Irish descent on both sides of his family and also has German ancestry from his paternal grandmother.

Brennan studied at Downlands College in Toowoomba and the University of Queensland where he graduated with honours in arts and law. He then studied at the Melbourne College of Divinity, where he graduated, again with honours, in divinity. He was awarded a Master of Laws as a result of further study at the University of Melbourne.

He was admitted to the Queensland Bar in 1977 and the Victorian Bar in 1978.

In 1975, Brennan was admitted to the Society of Jesus and 10 years later was ordained a Catholic priest.

== Career ==
Brennan's contact and involvement with Aboriginal Australians began early in his priestly ministry. In 1975 he worked in the inner Sydney parish of Redfern with priest activist Fr Ted Kennedy, where he also met and worked with Mum Shirl among others who were founding Indigenous Australian legal, health and political initiatives.

In 1997, he was rapporteur at the Australian Reconciliation Convention. The following year he was appointed an Ambassador for Reconciliation by the Council for Aboriginal Reconciliation.

He is known for his 1998 involvement in the Wik debate, following the 1996 court decision in Wik Peoples v Queensland.

On 10 December 2008 he was appointed as chair of the Australian government's National Human Rights Consultation Committee. In 2009 this independent committee consulted with the Australian community about the protection and promotion of human rights. On 30 September 2009, it reported its recommendations to the attorney general, Robert McClelland.

As of 2011, Brennan was a professor of law in the Public Policy Institute at the Australian Catholic University, and a visiting professorial fellow at the University of New South Wales. He served as the founding director of the Uniya Jesuit Social Justice Centre in Sydney from 2001 to 2007. In 2005, he returned to Australia from a fellowship at Boston College.

During 2011, Brennan was critical of the refugee policies of the then Prime Minister of Australia, Julia Gillard, saying that she had led the Labor Party of Australia into moral decline and that the Malaysia Solution was morally derelict and tantamount to "offshore dumping".

On 15 August 2017, Brennan stated that if the law was changed to require clergy to report child sexual abuse learned of during confession that he would consider breaking it. Brennan told ABC Radio National that "I as a Catholic priest would have to make a decision, whether in conscience, I could apply with such a law." He also said that "I think it would make children more vulnerable and not less."

During the 2017 Australian Marriage Law Postal Survey, Brennan dissented from traditional Catholic teaching, telling the media he would vote in favour. He stated that, while in the context of Catholic marriage he would continue to uphold marriage as being between a man and a woman, he considered the issue of civil marriage to be separate. Following the survey, Brennan was appointed by then prime minister Malcolm Turnbull to serve on a Philip Ruddock-led review into religious freedoms.

In November 2019, it was announced that Brennan would be one of 20 members of the Senior Advisory Group to help co-design the Indigenous Voice to Parliament set up by Ken Wyatt, the Minister for Indigenous Australians. The group was co-chaired by Wyatt, Marcia Langton and Tom Calma.

In 2019–20, Brennan was critical of the prosecution of Cardinal George Pell for child abuse. He equated the trial to a left-wing version of the broken criminal justice system in Queensland during the 1970s, saying that even Aboriginal people had not been treated as prejudicially by the worst of 19th-century judges.

== Honours ==
In 1995, Brennan was appointed an Officer of the Order of Australia (AO) in recognition of service to Aboriginal Australians, particularly as an advocate in the areas of law, social justice and reconciliation.

In 1996, he was jointly awarded with Pat Dodson the inaugural Australian Council For Overseas Aid Human Rights Award.

In 1998, he was named an Australian Living Treasures by the National Trust during his involvement in the Wik debate.

In 2002, Brennan was awarded the Humanitarian Overseas Service Medal for his work as director of the Jesuit Refugee Service in East Timor.

Brennan was made Doctor of the University by the Queensland University of Technology and was awarded a Doctor of Laws from the University of New South Wales in 2005.

== Bibliography ==
- Brennan, Frank (1983). Too much order with too little law. St Lucia, Queensland: University of Queensland Press.
- — (1991). Sharing the country. Ringwood, Victoria: Penguin.
- Brennan, Frank, ed. (1992). Reconciling our differences: a Christian approach to recognising Aboriginal Land Rights. Richmond, Victoria: Aurora Books / David Lovell Publishing. p. 117. ISBN 1-86355-030-5.
- Land rights Queensland style: the struggle for Aboriginal self-management. St Lucia, Queensland: University of Queensland Press. 1992. p. 182. ISBN 0-7022-2407-3.
- One land, one nation: Mabo: towards 2001. St Lucia, Queensland: University of Queensland Press. 1995. p. 236.
- Legislating Liberty: a bill of rights for Australia? A provocative and timely proposal to balance the public good with individual freedom. St Lucia, Queensland: University of Queensland Press. 1998. p. 201. ISBN 0-7022-3011-1.
- The Wik debate: its impact on Aborigines, pastoralists and miners. Sydney: UNSW Press. 1998. pp. 93. ISBN 0-86840-409-8.
- Tampering with Asylum: a universal humanitarian problem (paperback). St Lucia, Queensland: University of Queensland Press. 2003. p. 234. ISBN 0-7022-3416-8.
- — (2007). Acting on conscience : how can we responsibly mix law, religion and politics?. St Lucia, Queensland: University of Queensland Press. Winner of the 2007 Queensland Premier's Literary Award.
- — (23 April 2009). "Religion, Conscience and the Law". Australia. Quadrant.
- — (2015). Amplifying that still, small voice : a collection of essays. Adelaide: ATF Theology.
- No Small Change: The Road to Recognition for Indigenous Australia. St Lucia, Queensland: University of Queensland Press. 2015. ISBN 9780702253324.
- — (13 November 2016). "Five reasons to welcome US Manus deal". Australia. Eureka Street.
- Observations on the Pell Proceedings. Brisbane: Connor Court. 2021. ISBN 9781922449535.
- — (12 July 2022). "An Acquittal, Victoria Police and the Pell Case". Australia. Quadrant.
- Brennan, Frank (2023). An Indigenous voice to parliament : Considering a constitutional bridge. Mulgrave, Victoria: Garratt Publishing. ISBN 9781922484659.
- — (30 June 2023). "Cardinal Pell at the Hands of the Victorian Justice System". Australia. Quadrant.
