= Agymah Kamau =

Barbadian American novelist

Kwadwo Agymah Kamau is a Barbadian American novelist.

== Life ==
A native of Barbados, he moved to New York in 1977. He studied at Virginia Commonwealth University. He graduated from Baruch College of CUNY with a bachelor's degree in finance and a master's degree (1985) in quantitative economics. He served first as a statistician at the New York City Department of Investigation, then as a senior economist at the New York State Department of Taxation & Finance. He studied with Paule Marshall at Virginia Commonwealth University in the MFA program.

His work has appeared in Callaloo, Caribbean Vibes, Gumbo, InSyte Magazine, He teaches creative writing at the University of Oklahoma.

== Awards ==
- 2000: Virginia Governor's Award for the Arts nomination
- 2000: Commonwealth of Virginia/Library of Virginia Literary Award
- 2000: ForeWord Magazine's Book of the Year Award for Pictures of a Dying Man
- 2000: Gustavus Myers Book Award, finalist for Pictures of a Dying Man
- 2003: Whiting Award

== Works ==
- Flickering Shadows. Coffee House Press. 1996. ISBN 978-1-56689-049-6. "Agymah Kamau."
- Pictures of a Dying Man. Coffee House Press. 1999. ISBN 978-1-56689-087-8.
