= Tampering with Asylum =

2003 book by Frank Brennan

- Author: Frank Brennan
- Publication date: 2003

Tampering With Asylum: A Universal Humanitarian Problem is a 2003 book by the Australian Jesuit priest, human rights lawyer and academic Frank Brennan.

The Australia Government denied the MV Tampa ship, and asylum seekers it had rescued, permission to dock at the nearest landfall of Christmas Island (see Tampa affair). Brennan argues that this response by the Howard government was a "massive overreaction".

The book was launched at the National Press Club (Australia), on 5 November 2003, and was shortlisted for the 2004 Gleebooks Prize for Critical Writing at the New South Wales Premier's Literary Awards.
