= Mo's Mischief =

Children's book series by Yang Hongying

Mo's Mischief, known in Chinese as Mischief Maker Ma Xiaotiao (淘气包马小跳), is a series of children's books written by Chinese author Yang Hongying, first published in 2003. The books revolve around the protagonist Mo Shen Ma, a student studying in a normal Primary school in China. The plots mainly feature special events or stories about him and his friends, be it at home, in school, or anywhere else.

Mo is typically considered the troublemaker in class. He is playful, will only do what he likes and is unwilling to study, which gets him into trouble easily with his form teacher and the class monitor. However, Mo is generally a very sociable person; he is honest, trustworthy, helpful and has an avid imagination.

== Books in the series ==
The following lists the translated books (in order of publishing time) and their respective Chinese titles.

1. Four Troublemakers (四个调皮蛋)
2. Teacher's Pet (同桌冤家)
3. Pesky Monkeys (暑假奇遇)
4. Best Mom Ever (天真妈妈)
5. Best Friends (漂亮女孩夏林果)
6. Super Cool Uncle (丁克舅舅)
7. Pet Parade (宠物集中营)
8. Class Genius (小大人丁文涛)

== Notable Characters ==
- Mo and his friends, the Four Troublemakers
  - Mo Shen Ma (淘气包 马小跳)
  - Penguin (Tang Fei) (企鹅 唐飞)
  - Hippo (Zhang Da) (河马 张达)
  - Monkey (Mao Chao) (废话大王 毛超)
- Mo's family
  - Honeybunch (天真妈妈 丁蕊)
  - Uncle Dink (丁克舅舅)
  - Daisy (疯丫头 杜真子)
- School
  - Classmates
    - Lu Man-Man (同桌冤家 路曼曼)
    - Class Genius Wen-Tao Ting (成语大王 丁文涛)
    - Angel (笨女孩 安琪儿)
    - Lily (漂亮女孩 夏林果)
    - Joy (黄菊)
  - Teachers
    - Ms Qin (秦老师)
    - Ms Lin (林老师)
    - Mr Thunder (轰隆隆老师 雷鸣)
- Animals
  - Hurricane Hog (黑旋风)
  - Smiling Cat (笑猫)
- Miscellaneous
  - Miss Zhang (Miss 张)
  - Bat Ears (小非洲)
