= Courtney Angela Brkic =

American anthropologist and writer (born 1972)

- Born: 1972 (age 53–54); Washington, D.C., U.S.
- Education: Yorktown High School; College of William & Mary; New York University (MFA)
- Occupations: Memoirist; short story writer; academic
- Writing career
- Notable awards: Whiting Award (2003)
- Website: courtney-angela-brkic.com

Courtney Angela Brkic (born 1972) is a Croatian American memoirist, short story writer, and academic.

== Early life ==
Brkic is a native of Washington, D.C., who grew up in Arlington, Virginia, and graduated from Yorktown High School. She graduated from the College of William & Mary with a major in anthropology and a minor in Hispanic Studies. Before earning her MFA from New York University, Brkic lived in Bosnia, Croatia, and the Netherlands.

== Career ==
In 1996, at the age of 23, she went to eastern Bosnia and Herzegovina as part of a Physicians for Human Rights forensic team. She spent a month helping to exhume and identify the bodies of thousands of men and boys who were massacred by Serb forces the year before. She went on to work as a summary translator for the International Criminal Tribunal for the former Yugoslavia.

She has taught creative writing at New York University, the Cooper Union, and Kenyon College, where she held the Richard L. Thomas Chair in Creative Writing in 2006. She teaches at George Mason University, and lives in New York City with her husband, Phil.

== Awards ==
- 2008 National Endowment for the Arts Literature Grant
- 2003 Whiting Award for Fiction and Nonfiction
- Fulbright Scholarship to research women in Croatia's war-affected population
- New York Times Fellowship.

== Works ==
=== Books ===
- Stillness. Farrar, Straus and Giroux. 2003. ISBN 978-0-374-26999-9.
- The Stone Fields: An Epitaph for the Living. Farrar, Straus and Giroux. 2004. ISBN 978-0-374-20774-8. reprint. Picador. 2005. ISBN 978-0-312-42439-8.
- The First Rule of Swimming. Little, Brown and Company. 2013. ISBN 978-0-31621-738-5.

=== Translations ===
- A.B. Simic (April 2002). Modern Poetry in Translation 18. Translator Courtney Angela Brkic. King's College. ISBN 978-0-9533824-4-6. Archived from the original on 2007-07-31.

=== Short stories ===
- "Adiyo, Kerido". Zoetrope: All-Story. 7 (2). Summer 2003. Archived from the original on 2015-09-07.
- "Departure". Kenyon Review. 28 (2): 4–10. Spring 2006.
- "the offering". North American Review. 290 (6): 30–33. Dec 2006.
- "Gathering Up the Gods". Missouri Review. 29 (4): 42–57. Winter 2006. doi:10.1353/mis.2007.0035. S2CID 162189911.

=== Essays ===
- "Smoldering". Washington Post Magazine: W21. 16 January 2005.
