= Hilari Bell =

American fantasy author

- Born: February 2, 1958 (age 68)
- Occupation: Author
- Genres: Science fiction; fantasy

Hilari Bell (born 2 February 1958) is an American fantasy author. She is the author of several science-fiction and fantasy novels including the critically acclaimed Farsala Trilogy. Bell worked as a reference librarian, but quit in 2005 to write full-time. She lives with her mother, brother and sister-in-law in Denver, Colorado.

== Bibliography ==
=== Farsala Trilogy ===
- Flame (2003) (now titled Fall of a Kingdom)
- Rise of a Hero (2005)
- Forging the Sword (2006)

=== The Shield, Sword, and Crown series ===
- Shield of Stars (2007)
- Sword of Waters (2008)
- Crown of Earth (2009)

=== Knight and Rogue series ===
- The Last Knight (2007)

Michael, a "knight errant", and Fisk, his "squire"/con artist, must go on an adventure to find a murderer and bring her to justice. This book is part buddy novel, part mystery/adventure.

- Rogue's Home (2008)

Michael and Fisk are back. Michael is now an unredeemed man and when trouble arises at Fisk's home, Michael wants to help his friend, but fears he might be more of a hindrance then a help.

- Player's Ruse (2010)

When Rosamund runs away from home to marry an actor, Michael and Fisk agree to help her. When they end up in a town terrorized by wreckers, Michael vows to stop them and win his lady back.

- Thief's War (2014)

Michael and Fisk track Jack Bannister to Tallowsport, where Jack's employer has completely taken over the city. The two are divided both on the fonts from which they can thwart the man, or on how to handle the issue.

- Scholar's Plot (2014)
- Lady's Pursuit (2015)

=== The Goblin Wood ===
- The Goblin Wood (2003)
- The Goblin Gate (2010)
- The Goblin War (2011)

=== The Raven Duet ===
- Trickster's Girl (2011)
- Traitor's Son (2012)

=== Other novels ===
- Navohar (2000)
- Songs of Power (2000) (German language title: Oceantec 2051)
- A Matter of Profit (2001)
- The Wizard Test (2005)
- The Prophecy (2006)
