= Gerard Donovan =

Irish-born novelist, photographer and poet

- Born: 1959; Wexford
- Occupation: Lecturer at University of Plymouth
- Writing career
- Period: 1992 -
- Notable work: Schopenhauer's Telescope

Gerard Donovan (born 1959), is an Irish-born novelist, photographer and poet living in Plymouth, England, working as a lecturer at the University of Plymouth.

== Career ==
Donovan attracted immediate critical acclaim with his debut novel Schopenhauer's Telescope, which was long-listed for the Booker Prize in 2003, and which won the Kerry Group Irish Fiction Award in 2004. His subsequent novels include Doctor Salt (2005), Julius Winsome (2006), and Sunless (2007). However, Sunless is essentially a rewritten version of Doctor Salt—ultimately very different from the earlier novel, but built upon the same basic narrative elements—of which Donovan has said: "Doctor Salt... was a first draft of Sunless. I wrote [Doctor Salt] too fast, and the sense I was after just wasn't in the novel. ... I saw the chance to write the real novel, if you like, [when Doctor Salt was due to be published in the United States in 2007] and this I hope I've done in Sunless."

Before writing prose, Donovan published three collections of poetry: Columbus Rides Again (1992), Kings and Bicycles (1995), and The Lighthouse (2000). His next publication was Young Irelanders (2008) - a collection of short stories set in Ireland. He was said to be working on a novel set in early twentieth-century Europe.
