= Moonrise (Wolfson book) =

2003 book by Penny Wolfson

Moonrise (full title: Moonrise; One Family, Genetic Identity, And Muscular Dystrophy) is a 2003 book written by Penny Wolfson. The full name refers to her family and her son, Ansel, who struggled throughout life with Duchenne muscular dystrophy. The book was based on an article the author wrote for The Atlantic in 2001, which received a national magazine award.

== Plot ==
As Ansel progresses in life, he gets weaker, and begins to use a wheelchair, but stays much fitter than most with Duchenne. He later goes to Columbia University. After 23 years of living with this disability, Ansel died at age 38 from congestive heart failure, 20 years longer than predicted at the time of his diagnosis.
