= The King of Torts =

Novel by John Grisham

- Author: John Grisham
- Language: English
- Genre: Legal thriller novel
- Publisher: Doubleday
- Publication date: 2003
- Publication place: United States
- Media type: Print (Hardcover, Paperback)
- ISBN: 0-385-50804-2
- OCLC: 51033987

The King of Torts (2003) is a legal/suspense novel written by American author John Grisham. Doubleday published the first edition (ISBN 0-385-50804-2) in hardcover format; it immediately debuted at #1 on The New York Times Best Seller list, remaining in the top 15 for over 20 weeks. Dell Publishing published the paperback edition later in 2003 (ISBN 0-440-24153-7). Penguin Random House released an audiobook version in 2007.

== Plot ==
Clay Carter, a public defender in Washington, D.C., reluctantly takes on the case of Tequila Watson, a man accused of a random street killing. Watson insists that he somehow was not in control of his body when he pulled the trigger. Clay's investigation leads to him filing a subpoena forcing drug rehabilitation centers to hand over Watson's medical records, as well as those of another man accused of a similar murder.

Meanwhile, Clay is dating Rebecca Van Horn, a junior congressional aide, but loathes her father, real estate developer Bennett Van Horn. When Clay refuses an offer to work for a senator who is closely involved with Bennett's land deals in Northern Virginia, Bennett pressures Rebecca into ending their relationship.

Clay is contacted by a mysterious man named Max Pace, who tells him that Watson's records are evidence of a scandal. It is revealed that Watson and other recovering addicts were illegally given an experimental drug called Tarvan, which caused them to behave violently. Pace says he has been hired by the drug company responsible, asking Clay to resign from his job as a public defender and arrange secret payoffs to the victims. While doing so would mean hiding exculpatory evidence from Watson, Clay goes along with the scheme, partly to win back Rebecca's affections with his newfound wealth.

Clay opens a law firm specializing in mass torts, hiring several friends and colleagues: lawyer Paulette, paralegal Rodney and computer expert Jonah. He continues to work with Max, who provides insider information concerning Dyloft, a carcinogenic drug produced by Ackerman Laboratories. Advised by Max, Clay orchestrates an intensive TV campaign which results in a $100 million settlement, being dubbed the "King of Torts" by the press. While Clay and his firm enjoy a massive windfall from the settlement, his clients are bitter at getting only a bit more than $50,000 each.

Max offers Clay information on yet another defective drug called Maxatil. Expecting to repeat his success, Clay recklessly incurs enormous expenses: launching a coast-to-coast TV campaign; signing up dozens of additional staff; renting additional office space; and signing up thousands of "Maxatil clients." However, Clay finds that conclusively linking Maxatil to negative side effects is far from easy. Moreover, it is produced by Goffman, a company known for their unwillingness to compromise on tort suits. The future of the Maxatil suit depends on the outcome of a single, drawn out test case run by an aging maverick lawyer in Arizona.

Meanwhile, the FBI questions Clay on suspicion of insider trading. A criminal lawyer tells Clay that, having sold Ackerman shares short while knowing he would sue the company and push down the value of its shares, he is indeed culpable and could face prison. Max turns out to be a wanted con artist who has disappeared without a trace. Then, after Dyloft's effects are found to be deadlier than first thought, terminal patients who were kept from suing Ackerman for millions instead sue Clay for malpractice. Clay faces the prospect of being forced to consume all of his assets to pay his former clients.

Desperate for money, Clay turns to a mass tort against Hanna, a building supplies company which had produced batches of defective cement. The company's directors are willing to offer a fair compensation to disgruntled homeowners, but only if Clay agrees to cut his share of the compensations. Clay refuses, resulting in Hanna's bankruptcy, the loss of thousands of jobs and an economic disaster for the town where the company is based. When it becomes known that the collapse was caused by "a greedy lawyer," Clay is ambushed and beaten by some of the townsfolk.

Rebecca unexpectedly appears during Clay's recovery. Regaining her love helps him calmly take the final blow to his career: the jury in Arizona rejects the Maxatil suit, and all the millions which Clay invested in Maxatil goes down the drain. Clay is forced to declare bankruptcy, close down firm, give up his assets and surrender his law license. The FBI stops pursuing their case against Clay due to the loyalty of an old friend who refuses to provide incriminating evidence.

With nothing more to lose, Clay discloses his involvement in the Tarvan affair to an investigative journalist; a criminal lawyer will attempt to re-open the cases of the Tarvan test subjects, including Watson. Clay and Rebecca fly to London, where they would have a happy life without the opulence Clay no longer misses. It is, however, implied that Clay will still end up with a few million dollars in the end, because Paulette and Rodney—with whom Clay was extremely generous and loyal in distributing his initial settlements—both promise to return some of the money to him, never forgetting that they owe their financial success to him.
