= Yang Hongying =

Chinese writer

- 杨红樱
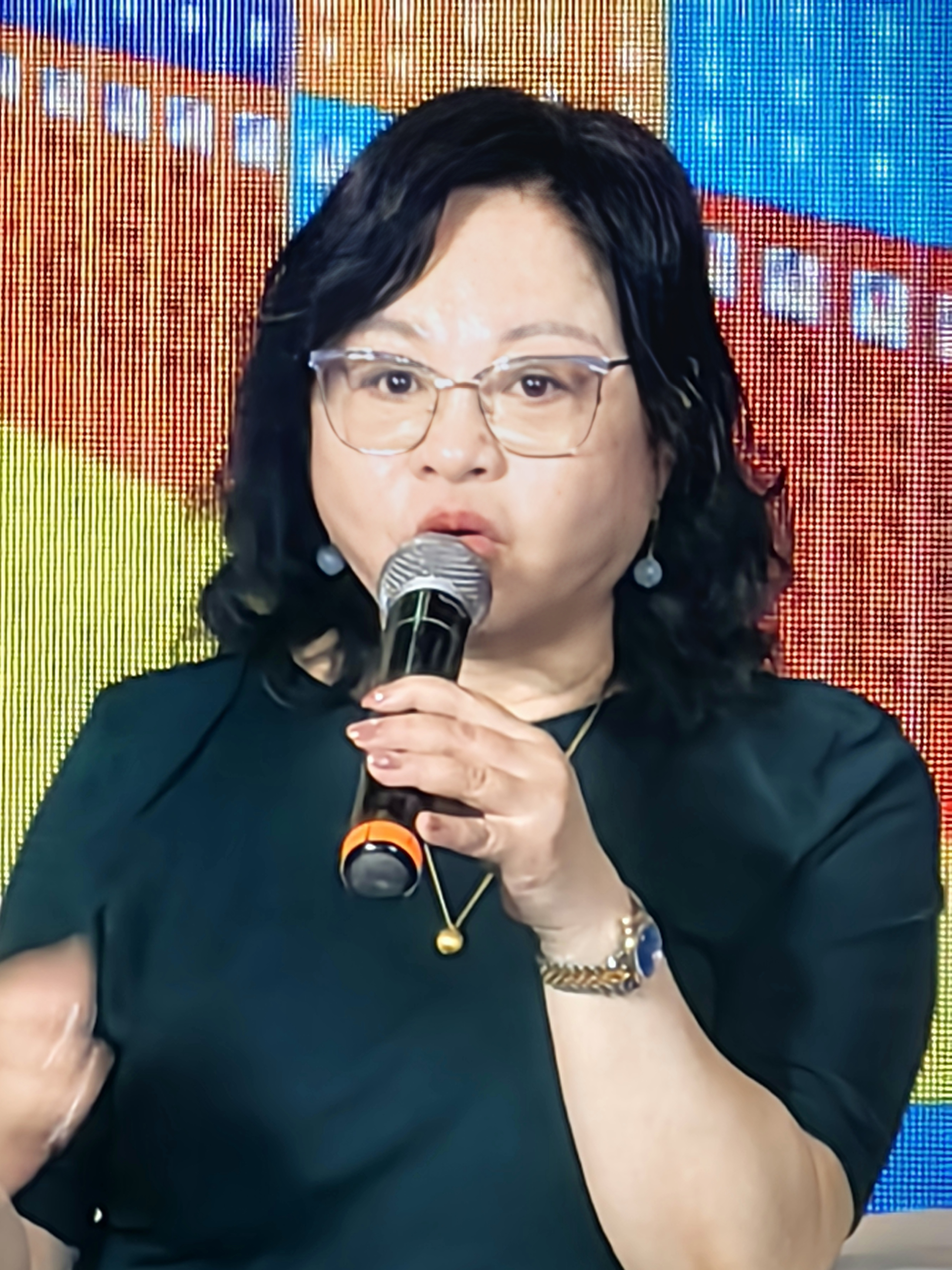
- Yang Hongying in July 2026
- Born: May 12, 1962 (age 64); Chengdu, Sichuan, China
- Occupations: Novelist, editor
- Writing career
- Language: Written Chinese
- Period: 1982–present
- Notable work: Mo's Mischief

Chinese name
- Traditional Chinese: 楊紅櫻
- Simplified Chinese: 杨红樱
Transcriptions
Standard Mandarin
- Hanyu Pinyin: Yáng Hóngyīng
- Wade–Giles: Yang^{2} Hung^{2}-ying^{1}
- IPA: [jǎŋ xʊ̌ŋíŋ]

Yang Hongying (born 12 May 1962) is a Chinese writer of children's fiction, who has been called "China's J. K. Rowling." As of 2013, her novels had sold more than 50 million copies, and she has been listed as one of the richest Chinese writers since 2006. Her best-selling works are the Mo's Mischief (or Ma Xiaotiao) and the Diary of a Smiling Cat series.

== Early life and education ==
Yang Hongying was born in 1962 in Chengdu, Sichuan Province. She was the youngest daughter of Yang Tianxiao, an office clerk. She credits her parents for giving her space and letting her develop freely. By her own account, she did not read much in early childhood, but as a teen she became fascinated with Chinese classical novels such as Water Margin and Dream of the Red Chamber. She read some sections repeatedly and studied how each character was introduced, which she said was helpful to her later writing.

== Career ==
After completing teacher training, she became a primary school Chinese teacher in 1980. The Cultural Revolution had just ended a few years before, and there was a dearth of children's reading material outside the textbooks. After teaching for a year, she began to write her own stories for the children. Her first story was A Seed in a Swimsuit, about a lotus seed floating in its green swimsuit, inspired by the popular animated film Little Tadpoles Looking for Mama. It was enthusiastically received by her class, and she wrote more than 100 stories in the next few years.

When a Shanghai children's newspaper began publishing her stories, she became more widely known and received a book contract. After teaching for seven years, she started a new job at a publishing house as an editor of children's books. In the early 1990s, she became chief editor at a children's magazine, and began writing a series of short stories known in English as Mo's Mischief, about a naughty but kind boy named Ma Xiaotiao (Mo Shen Ma in the English version). She says the idea of Ma Xiaotiao came from one of the students she had taught.

In 2000, the publication of her A Girl's Diary brought her national fame. The novel, about a preteen girl modelled after her own daughter, sold two million copies. This success has since been surpassed by her Mo's Mischief series, whose 20 titles had sold more than 30 million copies by 2013. She also wrote the Diary of a Smiling Cat series starting in 2006, targeting children between seven and nine years old. By 2013, she had written 18 books which sold 20 million copies.

HarperCollins has acquired rights to translate her works into other languages. As of 2010, it had translated six books from the Mo's Mischief series into English and sold 200,000 copies of them, with no plans to publish more. Although this figure pales in comparison to sales at home, HarperCollins has been quoted as saying "The performance of Yang's books is the best among the books we've introduced from China to the English-speaking world." Luo Yirong (2015) identified a number of reasons why the series failed to achieve more success in English, including market differences and over-domestification in the translation.

In 2010, she ranked first in the "Fifth China Rich Writers List".

In 2012, she published a collection of essays "Reasons for Loving Zaizai". In November 2019, the enlightenment picture book "Panda Diary" was launched.

== Publications ==
Diary of a Smiling Cat series (the translations below are approximate)

- (1) 《保姆狗的阴谋》 - Nanny Dog's Secret Plan
- (2) 《塔顶上的猫》 - Cat Overhead
- (3) 《想变成人的猴子》 - The Monkey who wanted to be Human
- (4) 《能闻出孩子味儿的乌龟》 - The Turtle that can Sniff Out Children
- (5) 《幸福的鸭子》 - The Lucky Duck
- (6) 《虎皮猫，你在哪里》 - Where are you, Tabby Cat?
- (7) 《蓝色的兔耳朵草》 - Blue Rabbit Ear Grass
- (8) 《小猫出生在秘密山洞》 - Little Cat born in a Secret Cave
- (9) 《樱桃沟的春天》 - Cherry Valley in Spring
- (10) 《那个黑色的下午》 - One Dark Afternoon
- (11) 《一头灵魂出窍的猪》 - An Ingenious Pig
- (12) 《球球老老鼠》 - The Mouse
- (13) 《绿狗山庄》 - Green Dog Mountain Village
- (14) 《小白的选择》 - Xiaobai's Choice
- (15) 《孩子们的秘密乐园》 - The Children's Secret Garden
- (16) 《永远的西瓜小丑》Everlasting Watermelon Clown
- (17) 《寻找黑骑士》 = Looking for the Dark Knight
- (18) 《会唱歌的猫》 - The Cat that can Sing
- (19) 《从外星球来的孩子》 - The Child from Another Planet
- (20) 《云朵上的学校》 - The School on the Clouds
- (21) 《青蛙合唱团》 - The Chorus of Frogs
- (22) 《转动时光的伞》 - The Umbrella that Turns Time
- (23)《樱花巷的秘密》- Secret of Cherry Blossom Alley
- (24) 《又见小可怜》- Seeing the Poor Thing Again
- (25) 《属猫的人》- Catperson
