= Fall of a Kingdom =

2003 novel by Hilari Bell

Fall of a Kingdom, previously entitled Flame
- First edition
- Author: Hilari Bell
- Original title: Flame
- Cover artist: Greg Newbold
- Language: English
- Series: Farsala Trilogy
- Genre: Fantasy novel
- Publisher: Simon & Schuster
- Publication date: 2003
- Publication place: United States
- Media type: Print (Hardback, Paperback)
- Pages: 344 pp
- ISBN: 0-689-85413-7
- OCLC: 53190020
- LC Class: PZ7.B38894 Fla 2003
- Followed by: Rise of a Hero

Fall of a Kingdom is the first novel in the Farsala Trilogy by American author Hilari Bell. It was previously published under the name Flame. The series it was in was also referred to as the "Book of Sorahb".

== Plot summary ==
When the Hrum army arrive in the country of Farsala, a war is started, and just three people can stop it.

Kavi is a peasant peddler selling bronze goods plated in gold and he holds a grudge against the deghans. When he was a young apprentice to a man in the city of Mazad, a deghan came in looking for a remarkable sword and is willing to pay an astronomical price for it, but does not have the money with him. Kavi grabs for the sword, but the deghan pulls and scars his right hand. A year later, the deghan returns for the swords pay, and throws in a bonus amount "For his troubles". The cut cripples him with an injury that still pains him years later. While Kavi is running from a city where he is found to be selling false gold items, he is caught up in High Commander Merahb's plan. He is to visit the cottage where Soraya is staying to supply her with the goods and news that a deghass is accustomed to, and he is to do it like an obedient peasant should. But while he is on his usual rounds of the northern mining towns selling second rate iron goods to the country folk, he is captured by Hrum scouts who have infiltrated Farsala unknown. To save his own life Kavi agrees to turn traitor to Farsala and spy for the Hrum. He also believes that the Hrum will be better rulers of Farsala than the deghans.

When the Hrum arrive in Farsala the deghans and their unstoppable charge is ready to meet them. Seconds before the wall of horses slams into the Hrum's front line, spears five yards long and as thick as saplings appear throughout the Hrum line. The deghans' charge is dissolved and half of their army is killed in their initial charge. Jiaan is thrown from his horse and is knocked unconscious. He also thinks he broke his collar bone. During this time the Farsalan army is being driven back to their camp. When Jiaan wakes up, all he sees is his father attempting to save his army and challenge the Hrum's champion to a life or death duel for victory or defeat. Before Commander Merahb could do anything else, he is shot by four arrows. Then, attempting to get up, he gets shot with another volley of arrows that kills him. With the High Commander dead and the Farsalan army defeated and virtually non-existent, Jiaan has to scrounge up an army of peasants and try to defeat an empire that spans half of the known world.

== Characters ==
=== Major characters ===
- Jiaan – An eighteen-year-old peasant. He is the illegitimate son of the High Commander Merahb, and therefore is Soraya's half-brother. He has curly brown hair and light-greenish eyes. He is brave, courageous, and very loyal to Farsala.
- Kavi – A nineteen-year-old peddler who was raised in Mazad working in a blacksmith. He hates deghans and gives information to the Hrum army so that they can defeat the Farsalan army, because he believes that his country will be a better place under Hrum rule.
- Soraya – A fifteen-year-old deghass with long black hair and brown eyes. She is extremely arrogant, self-centered, and is used to getting exactly what she wants when she wants it.

=== Minor characters ===
- Patrius – A very kind and honest Hrum officer who befriends Kavi.
- Fasal – A young deghan who doesn't get along very well with Jiaan. One of the few deghans to survive the battle with the Hrum.
- Commander Merahb – Soraya and Jiaan's father and commander of the Farsalan army.
- Sudaba – Soraya's mother. Very demanding and is like her daughter in the sense that they both enjoy the luxury of the palace life.
