= Your Pilot's License =

Your Pilots License
- Author: Jerry A. Eichenberger
- Series: Practical Flying Series
- Subject: Aviation
- Genre: Non-fiction
- Publisher: McGraw-Hill
- Publication date: 2003
- Publication place: United States
- Pages: 372
- ISBN: 0-07-140285-3
- OCLC: 52347497
- Dewey Decimal: 629.132/5217 21
- LC Class: TL710 .E4424 2003

Your Pilot's License is a book published in 2003 by Jerry A. Eichenberger. It was published by McGraw Hill as part of the Practical Flying Series. The book details aspects of training, such as practice maneuvers and cross country planning. It is written in a Laymen's style for beginners to aviation.
