= Tyne O'Connell =

British author (born 1960)

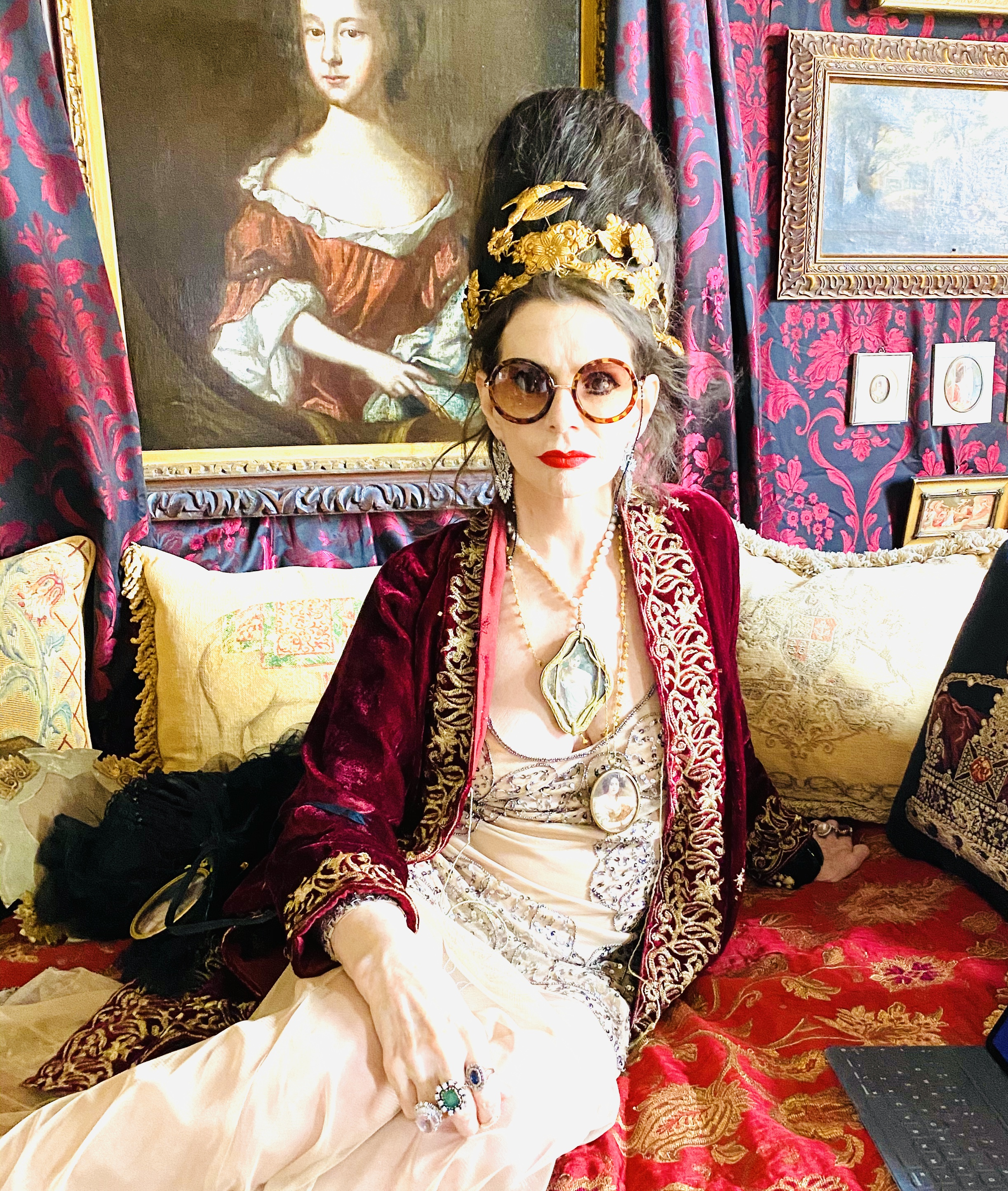
- O'Connell in Mayfair, London
- Born: 7 October 1960 (age 65)
- Occupation: Novelist
- Writing career
- Period: 1996–present
- Genres: Romantic comedy; Contemporary women's literature; Teen fiction

Tyne O'Connell (born Clementyne Rose O'Connell 7 October 1960) is a British author and historian of Irish descent who lives and works in Mayfair, London. Mayfair serves as a backdrop for much of her contemporary women's fiction, including Making the A-List (Headline Review, 1999) and Sex with the Ex (Red Dress Ink UK, 2004). She has written for publications such as Ms., Elle UK and Journal. Her short stories appear in Girls' Night Out and Kid's Night In. She is a contributor to Holiday Goddess. O'Connell was The Eccentric Club's "Most Eccentric Thinker of the Year" 2015.

Bloomsbury USA published a compilation of O'Connell's YA fiction Royal Match and Royal Mess in 2012 to coincide with the Royal Wedding. Soon after O'Connell was diagnosed with a brain tumour. In 2016 she received the "Order of the Crown of Stuart" for historical research into the emergence of eccentricity as a quintessential aspect of the British and Irish character through the Stuart Monarchy's embrace of the Baroque and the scientific revolution 1603–1714.

CNN Style in its documentary The Adorned describes O'Connell as "The Mayfair-based author and socialite seems to have been torn straight from the pages of an Evelyn Waugh novel; with her cut-glass accent, perma-fixed tiara and layers of pearls." Despite this diagnosis, O’Connell has continued to embrace the extraordinary.

In 2017 the Academic Economic Congress awarded Tyne O'Connell the title of Knowledge Ambassador for her work as a historian and specifically for her work on the history of eccentricity. O'Connell also appeared on the 2019 BBC "A Brief History of Eccentricity".

== Contemporary fiction ==
O'Connell's first novel, Sex, Lies and Litigation was published in the UK in 1996 by Headline Review. Headline Review published five books by O'Connell, the most popular of which was What's a Girl to Do?. In 2000 she made her US publishing début with The Sex Was Great But..., published by RDI and followed by Sex with the Ex.

O'Connell's stories tend to feature British eccentrics and aristocrats.

== YA fiction ==
In 2003 O'Connell began writing young adult fiction. Pulling Princes published by Bloomsbury US and Piccadilly UK, and translated into 13 languages was the first in the Calypso Chronicles. The series of four books focus on the adventures of a group of privileged and aristocratic teenagers attending two English single-sex boarding schools in Berkshire.

Pulling Princes, Stealing Princes, Dueling Princes and Dumping Princes were published by Bloomsbury US and Piccadilly UK. A further teen novel was published by Bloomsbury US in 2007: True Love, The Sphinx and Other Unsolvable Riddles, which the School Library Journal referred to as a "flirty, fun romcom, told from four distinctive points of view, [that] reads like an old-time comedy of errors. O'Connell describes Egypt with such vitality and richness that it shines as a separate character. This novel is a trip worth taking..."

In 2011, coinciding with the Royal Wedding of Prince William and Catherine Middleton, O'Connell's first two books from the Calypso Chronicles were published together in the UK, US and several other countries in a single volume entitled A Royal Match. This was followed by A Royal Mess a single volume of books containing numbers three and four in the series.

== Film ==
Tyne O'Connell played the role of the Madam in John Story and Anthony Zaki's film Against Nature based on Joris-Karl Huysmans novel A Rebours. The film co-starred Allan Corduner and Adrian Dunbar along with the well-known dandy Robin Dutt set in private members club Home House. In 2022 Tyne O'Connell was cast as herself in the Tim Yip film Love Infinity.

== Publications ==
- Sex, Lies and Litigation (1996) Headline Review
- Latest Accessory (1997) Headline Review
- What's a Girl to Do? (1998) Headline Review
- Making the A-list (1999) Headline Review
- That Girl-Boy Thing (2000) Headline Review
- The Sex Was Great But... (2004) Red Dress Ink
- Sex with the Ex (2005) Red Dress Ink
- Pulling Princes (2003) Bloomsbury USA/Piccadilly Press UK
- Stealing Princes (2004) Bloomsbury USA/Piccadilly Press UK
- Duelling Princes (2005) Bloomsbury USA/Piccadilly Press UK
- Dumping Princes (2006) Bloomsbury USA/Piccadilly Press UK
- True Love, the Sphinx and Other Unsolvable Riddles (2007) Bloomsbury USA/Piccadilly Press UK
- A Royal Match (2010) Bloomsbury USA/Piccadilly Press UK
- A Royal Mess (2011) Bloomsbury USA
- Pulling Princes – A Royal Christmas (2014)
- The Mayfair Cook (2014)
- My London (2018) The London Magazine
