= Matthew Sharpe (writer) =

American novelist

Matthew Sharpe (born 1962) is an American novelist and short story writer.

== Career ==
Sharpe's fourth book Jamestown was published in 2007, set in the first permanent English settlement in America reimagined as a modern-day dystopia, called by The Washington Post an "absurd hybrid of Cormac McCarthy's The Road and Walt Disney's Pocahontas". He followed it up with You Were Wrong, published in 2010. The New York Times praised it for "devastatingly comic observations about people, places and things — observations that fortify a novel whose subject and, well, whose stake in the horror and pathos of being alive seem flimsy in comparison".

== Bibliography ==
- Stories from the Tube (short stories, 1998)
- Nothing Is Terrible (novel, 2000)
- The Sleeping Father (novel, 2003)
- Jamestown (novel, 2007)
- You Were Wrong (novel, Bloomsbury 2010)
