= N. M. Kelby =

American writer

Nicole Mary Kelby, published as N. M. Kelby, is an American writer of plays, short stories, and novels.

== Early life and education ==
Nicole Mary Kelby was brought up in Florida, United States.

== Career ==
Kelby has worked as a reporter, editor, and educator. Initially a playwright, she later turned to novels and short stories.

She is the author of Murder at the Bad Girl’s Bar and Grill, Whale Season, In the Company of Angels, and Theater of the Stars.

Her short stories have appeared in many publications, including Zoetrope All-Story Extra, One Story, Minnesota Monthly, Verb, and The Mississippi Review. One was recorded by actress Joanne Woodward for the NPR CD Travel Tales, and included in New Stories from the South: Best of 2006.

Kelby took part in a month-long cultural exchange at Tyrone Guthrie Centre in County Monaghan, Ireland and was the Artist-in-Residence at the Santa Fe Art Institute in May 2008.

She has worked on a film adaptation of Whale Season along with actor/singer/songwriter Dwight Yoakam.

Kelby's books have been reviewed in Entertainment Weekly, New York Times Book Review, San Francisco Chronicle, Minneapolis Star Tribune, Atlantic Monthly, Baltimore Sun, Publishers Weekly, New York Post, New York Times Sunday Book Review, Kirkus Reviews, and The Philadelphia Inquirer.

== Awards and honors ==
Kelby has been the recipient of a Bush Artist Fellowship in Literature, the Heekin Group Foundation's James Fellowship for the Novel, both a Florida and Minnesota State Arts Board Fellowship in fiction, two Jerome Travel Study Grants, and a Jewish Arts Endowment Fellowship.

She has been a Pirate's Alley Faulkner Award finalist for fiction several, times and a finalist in the Nelson Algren Award for short stories.

Kelby was named "Outstanding Southern Artist" by the Southern Arts Federation, and her work has been translated into several languages.

== Selected works ==
- In the Company of Angels (2001, Hyperion: ISBN 9780786885831)
- Theater of the stars: a novel of physics and memory (2003, Theia: ISBN 9780786868582)
- Whale Season: a novel (2006, Shaye Areheart Books: ISBN 9780307336774)
- Murder at the Bad Girl's Bar & Grill: a novel (2008, Shaye Areheart Books: ISBN 9780307382078)
- The constant art of being a writer : the life, art & business of fiction (2009, Writers' Digest Books: ISBN 9781582975757)
- White Truffles in Winter (2011, W. W. Norton & Company: ISBN 9780393079999) about Auguste Escoffier
- The Pink Suit (2015, Virago: ISBN 9781844089758) about Jacqueline Kennedy
