= Dean Kalimniou =

Australian lawyer and writer

Dean Kalimniou (also known as Konstantinos Kalymnios) (Greek: Κωνσταντῖνος Καλυμνιός) is an Australian lawyer and writer of Greek descent.

== Early life and education ==
Dean Kalimniou was born in Melbourne, Australia. He studied law and arts, majoring in Modern Greek studies.

== Career ==
As spokesperson for the Panepirotic Federation of Australia, he has consistently raised awareness of the plight of the Northern Epirot Greek minority in Southern Albania, traveling to Albania on many occasions to research their situation. As a journalist, Dean Kalimniou is popular within the Greek community of Australia through his column in the Melbourne Greek newspaper Neos Kosmos (New World), entitled Diatribe, which has been running since 2001, and as a regular columnist in OPA! magazine, New York's NEO magazine and Weekly Hubris.

Dean Kalimniou is also a well-known poet and short story writer, widely noted as one of the few Australian born Greek poets who produce literature in the Greek language. He has published eight poetry collections:

- Kipos Esokleistos Κῆπος Ἐσώκλειστος ("Garden Enclosed") (2003),
- Alexipyrina Ἀλεξιπύρινα ("Flameproof") (2004),
- Apteros Niki Ἄπτερος Νίκη ("Wingless Victory") (2008),
- Anisixasmos Ἀνησυχασμός (2010),
- "Plektani" Πλεκτάνη (2012),
- "Kelyfospastis" Κελυφοσπάστης (2013),
- "Motherlands" Μητρίδες (2017).
- "Androktasies" Ἀνδροκτασίες (2025).

Poems of his also appear in the Anthology of Northern Epirot Poetry (Athens 2018) (Ανθολογία Βορειοηπειρωτικής Ποίησης, Αθήνα 2018)

His Essays have appeared in such publications as Etchings, Αιολικά Γράμματα, "Fathers from the Edge" (2015 Owl Publishing) and Phronema "Towards 1821. Nationhood in the Teachings and Prophecies of St Kosmas the Aetolian." (Vol 36 2021). In 2013, Professor Vrasidas Karalis stated that Dean Kalimniou is one of the most significant Greek language poets of the Greek diaspora.

In 2021 Dean Kalimniou published his first bilingual Greek-English children's book, "Soumela and the Magic Kemenche" "Η Σουμέλα κι ο μαγικός Κεμεντζές" (St Andrews Orthodox Press ISBN 978-0-646-84263-9)

In 2023, his first collection of short stories in Greek "Εικονοκλάσματα" (Eikonoklasmata) was published (I. N Zaharopoulos ΙSBN 978-618-5644-25-3).

His second children's book, "The Librarian of Cappadocia" was published in 2024. (Bonfire Books ISBN 978-0-6457768-6-7)

Dean Kalimniou has also translated the following works of prominent Greek-Australian authors from Greek into English:

- Faye Mangos "A Cry of the Heart" (2004)
- Nikos Vournazos: "Dancing Solo" (2005)
- Dionysia Mousoura-Tsoukala: "Words and Memories in Melbourne" (2007)
- Vakina Panagiotidou: "The Triumph of Tragedy" (2008)
- Stratis Vakras: "Alisavo: Chasing the Dream" (2009)
- Thanassis Papastergiou: "The North Winds Arrived Early" (2010) and "Poems through the Looking Glass" (2010)
- Sotirios Manolopoulos: "A Migrant's Hopeful Dawn" (2015)
- Dimitrios Troaditis: "Tightrope Walking" (2017)

He was also a contributor translator of Alexandros Papadiamantis, "The Boundless Garden. Selected Short Stories. Volume II". (2019) In 2024-2025 his play Όπου Γης και Patris toured Australia and Greece.

In November 2007, Dean Kalimniou was awarded a Government of Victoria Award for Excellence in Multicultural Affairs by the Governor of Victoria, Professor David de Kretser.

In 2009, Dean Kalimniou wrote the script of the Peter Stephanidis short film: The Message.
