= Sy Barry =

American cartoonist (born 1928)

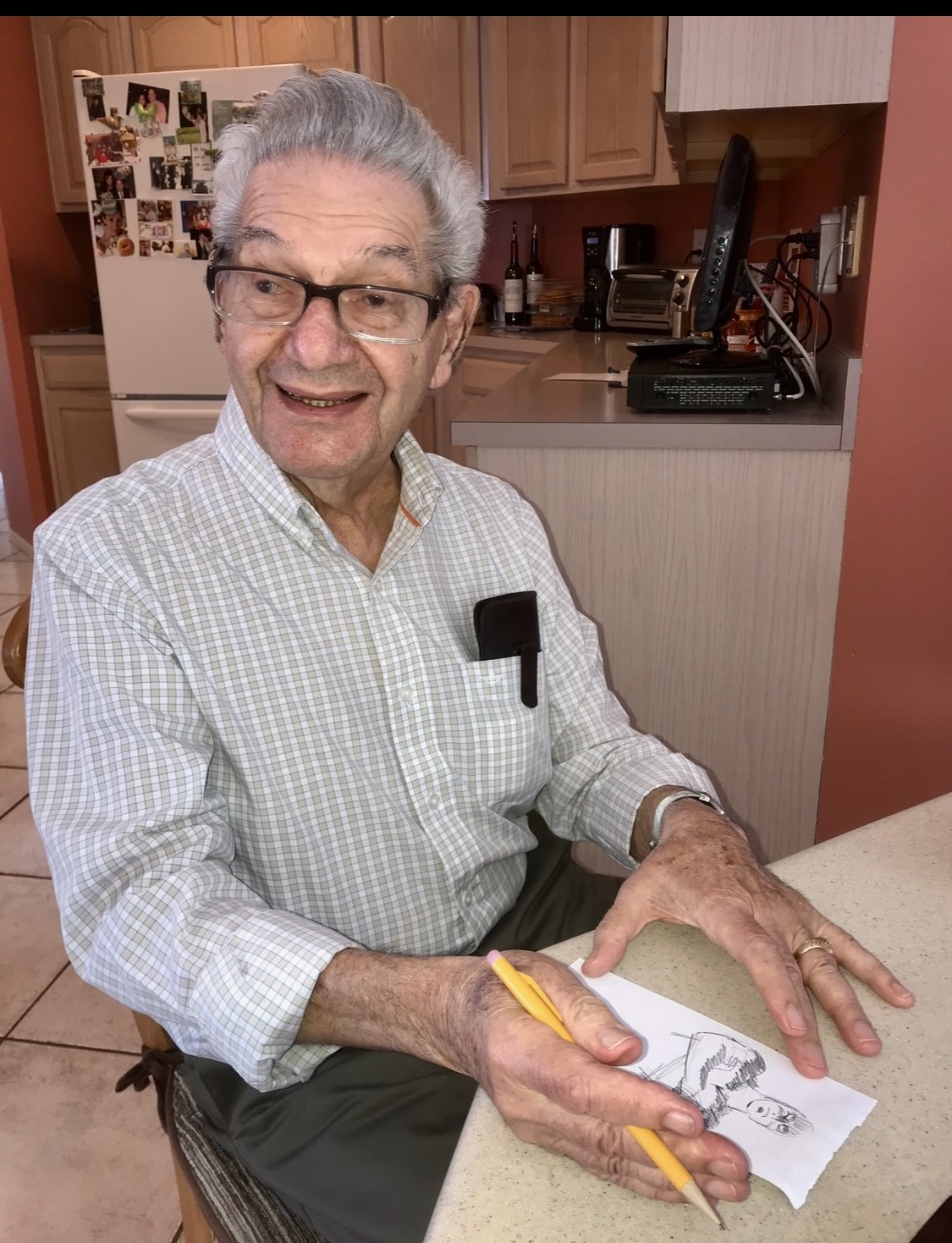
- Sy Barry at the drawing table
- Born: Seymour Barry; March 12, 1928 (age 98)
- Areas: penciller, inker
- Notable works: The Phantom; Martin Luther King and the Montgomery Story
- Awards: Inkpot Award (2005); Inkwell Awards Stacey Aragon Special Recognition Award (SASRA)

Seymour "Sy" Barry (born March 12, 1928) is an American comic-book and comic-strip artist, best known for being the artist of the strip The Phantom for more than three decades.

== Biography ==
Sy Barry was born in New York City in 1928, and is the brother of comics artist Dan Barry, who drew the Flash Gordon comic strip. Sy Barry attended high school at the School of Industrial Art in Manhattan, New York City beginning in 1943. His first job as an artist was working on the comic book Famous Funnies. Barry began his professional career as his brother's art assistant, and by the late 1940s was working on his own as a freelance comic-book artist, primarily as an inker for publishers including Lev Gleason, the Marvel Comics precursor Timely Comics, and the DC Comics precursor National Comics. At National, he worked on features including Romance Comics, Mystery in Space, Detective Comics, Superboy, Johnny Peril, World's Finest Adventure Comics, Rex the Wonder Dog, and The Phantom Stranger.

By the early 1950s Sy Barry was very much in demand as an inker, and he was one of the best. He also assisted his brother Dan on the Tarzan comic strip for United Feature Syndicate and the Flash Gordon comic strip from King Features Syndicate. He was hired by Capp Studio to draw Martin Luther King and the Montgomery Story, a comics pamphlet published in 1957. Barry's signature was visible on the cover of the pamphlet's first edition, but a text box covered it in later printings. The Montgomery Story, written by Alfred Hassler and Benton Resnik and distributed by the Fellowship of Reconciliation, "taught young people not just about the event itself but also about nonviolence as a tool for social change." Many decades later, the comic inspired the March trilogy by Georgia Congressman John Lewis.

In 1961, upon the death of The Phantom artist Wilson McCoy, who had succeeded artist Ray Moore, King Features hired Barry to take over that strip. Within three years the Phantom’s readership increased to over 900 newspapers becoming the most popular Phantom artist ever, His Phantom added a sense of realism and style to the character that has never been seen before. Barry remained on it for more than 30 years until his retirement in 1994. Barry frequently used pencil artists on the strip, working primarily as an inker, though he often drew entire stories when time permitted.

Barry's first Phantom daily strip was published on August 21, 1961 and his last on September 3, 1994.

He replaced Bill Lignante on the Sundays. His first Phantom Sunday page was published on May 20, 1962 and his last on September 18, 1994.
