= Martin Luther King and the Montgomery Story =

1957 comic book

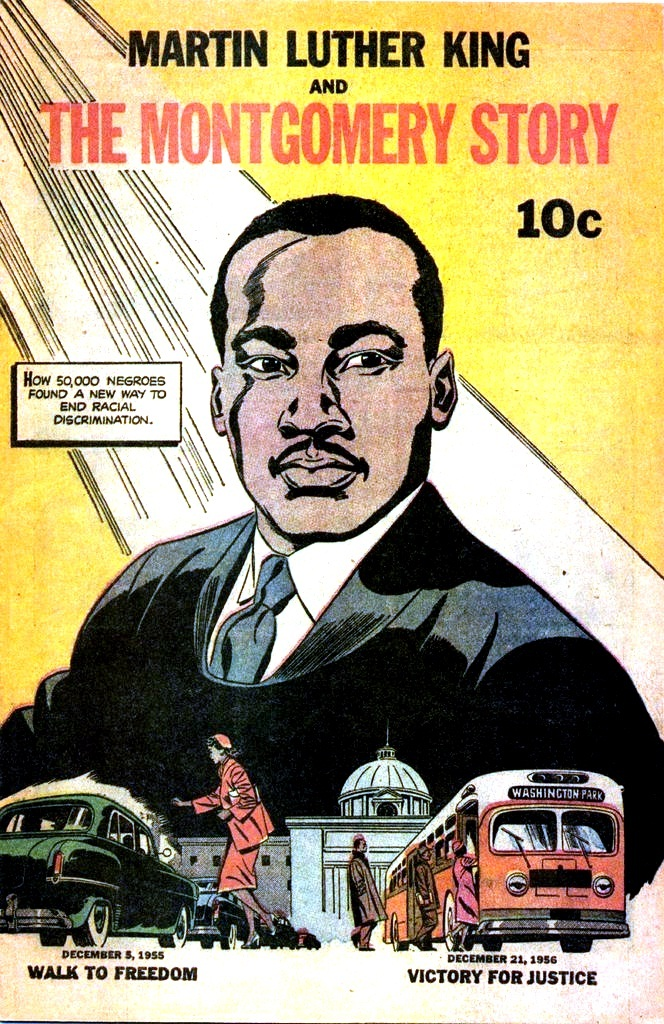
- Cover of Martin Luther King and the Montgomery Story

Publication information
- Publisher: Fellowship of Reconciliation
- Format: One-shot
- Genre: non-fiction
- Publication date: December 1957
- No. of issues: 1
- Main character(s): Martin Luther King Jr. Coretta Scott King; Rosa Parks; Mahatma Gandhi

Creative team
- Written by: Alfred Hassler and Benton Resnik
- Artist: Sy Barry

Martin Luther King and the Montgomery Story is a 16-page comic book about Martin Luther King Jr., Rosa Parks, and the Montgomery bus boycott published in 1957 by the Fellowship of Reconciliation (FOR USA). It advocates the principles of nonviolence and provides a primer on nonviolent resistance.

Although ignored by the mainstream comics industry, The Montgomery Story, written by Alfred Hassler and Benton Resnik and illustrated by Sy Barry, was widely distributed among civil rights groups, churches, and schools. It helped inspire nonviolent protest movements around the Southern United States, and later in Latin America, South Africa, the Middle East, and elsewhere. Over 50 years after its initial publication, the comic inspired the best-selling, award-winning March trilogy by Georgia Congressman John Lewis.

== Publication history ==
Following the success of the Montgomery bus boycott, which FOR USA had helped organize, executive secretary and director of publications Alfred Hassler, and FoR member the Rev. Glenn E. Smiley came up with the idea of using a comic book to bring the story of the bus boycott to a wide audience. (Smiley had been personally active in the bus boycott, and had formed a friendship with Dr. King.) Presenting the comic idea as a way to reach wider audiences (including those with lower reading levels), the group acquired grant funding of $5,000 for the project from the Fund for the Republic. Dr. King himself endorsed the book and even provided a few editorial suggestions.

Cartoonist Al Capp was an admirer of Dr. King; his studio produced Martin Luther King and the Montgomery Story at no charge, which was co-written by Hassler and Benton Resnik, (Note: Benton Resnik had been an editor and writer for the Al Capp-owned comics companies Toby Press and Graphic Information Services.) and drawn by an uncredited artist. (The artist was later confirmed, by cartoonist James Romberger, to have been Sy Barry.) Martin Luther King and the Montgomery Story was published in December 1957 in full-color with a cover price of 10 cents. 250,000 copies were printed.

Instead of the typical distribution network for comics in those days, which were newsstands, pharmacies, and candy stores, The Montgomery Story was distributed by the Fellowship of Reconciliation among civil rights groups, churches, and schools. It was also promoted in pro-Civil Rights publications such as National Guardian and Peace News. FoR staff members, particularly Jim Lawson (an African American divinity student at Vanderbilt University) and Glenn Smiley, traveled through the South, giving workshops on nonviolence. They would distribute the comic to younger attendees as something to take with them and study.

At some point not long after its original publication, FoR produced a Spanish version of the comic for distribution throughout Latin America. Instead of using the same art as the English edition, the Spanish version is a complete copy of the original, drawn by a different artist. 125,000 copies were printed, but only a handful of copies of the Spanish version still exist.

=== Revival ===
Comics writer/editor Joyce Brabner attempted to have the comic reprinted in the early 1990s, but even with funding in place, was unable to find a publisher for it.

In 2004 comic book artist, writer and historian Tom Christopher researched the King comic and posted an article about it (which included art samples of both the English and Spanish versions) on his website. Christopher had previously documented the publication of All-Negro Comics (1947) and the Golden Legacy and Fast Willie Jackson series (1976), and those articles included information on other comics such as Negro Heroes and Negro Romance. Christopher described Martin Luther King and the Montgomery Story not in terms of being a rare or obscure comic but as an historic document, placing it in the political context of the times and explaining non-violence as a workable tool for social change. Martin Luther King and the Montgomery Story became a major attraction on his website, and the next Overstreet Comic Book Price Guide listed the book for the first time.

By 2006, there were only a handful of copies of Martin Luther King and the Montgomery Story left in existence. That year, cartoonist/archivist Ethan Persoff scanned an original copy of the comic and posted it on his blog for Martin Luther King Jr. Day. In 2008, Persoff reported that the Cairo director of the American Islamic Congress (AIC) had translated the scanned comic into Arabic and Persian. The AIC's HAMSA (Hands Across the Mideast Support Alliance) initiative printed 2,500 copies of the translated comic, distributing them throughout Algeria, Bahrain, Iraq, Kuwait, Lebanon, Morocco, Saudi Arabia, Tunisia, and Yemen.

Until 2012, no history of Martin Luther King and the Montgomery Story had been written, and most versions of how the comic was created listed Al Capp as the actual creator. As part of his graduate degree at Georgetown University, Andrew Aydin wrote the first long-form history of The Montgomery Story as his graduate thesis. With the help of Carlow University Professor Dr. Sylvia Rhor and comic book icon Eddie Campbell, Aydin established most of what is known about the comic's creation and use. In August 2013, Aydin published a shortened version of his thesis as the feature article in Creative Loafing's award-winning "Future of Nonviolence" issue, which was guest-edited by Congressman John Lewis and Aydin.

Since 2011, the Fellowship of Reconciliation (United States) reprinted copies of the comic that are available for sale in their website store in English, Spanish, Arabic and Persian. Their website also provides the free Martin Luther King and the Montgomery Story Curriculum and Study Guide. The comic has also been published in Italian and Vietnamese.

In 2013, Top Shelf Productions published, in collaboration with Fellowship of Reconciliation, an authorized re-issue of the comic, with all proceeds going to the Fellowship of Reconciliation.

== Plot ==
The comic opens with a one-page synopsis of Martin Luther King Jr.'s life and education up until 1957.

The narrative then shifts to Montgomery, Alabama, in 1954. An African American man named Jones tells of life in Montgomery under Jim Crow laws. He describes the events of the Montgomery bus boycott and the important role played by Rosa Parks and Martin Luther King Jr. In the story, King advocates nonviolence, even when his own home is bombed during the boycott.

The last section of the comic discusses the "Montgomery Method" of nonviolence, its roots in the activism of Mahatma Gandhi, and provides practical advice on how to pursue nonviolent activism.

== Legacy ==
Martin Luther King and the Montgomery Story influenced other civil rights activists, including the Greensboro Four.

Thanks to the 2008 American Islamic Congress HAMSA initiative, thousands of copies of the Arabic and Persian version of the comic were distributed to democracy advocates throughout the Middle East. When the Egyptian Revolution of 2011 broke out, U.S. Representative John Lewis credited the mass-distribution of the 50-year-old comic as a contributing element in the Egyptian protests.

A hard copy of the Spanish edition of the comic is housed in the National Museum of African American History and Culture, part of the Smithsonian Institution.

=== March ===
Georgia Congressman John Lewis read Martin Luther King and the Montgomery Story as a teenager. The comic book demonstrated in clear fashion to Lewis the power of the philosophy and the discipline of nonviolence. Later, as he attended weekly meetings with students from Fisk University, Tennessee State University, Vanderbilt University, and American Baptist College to discuss nonviolent protest, The Montgomery Story served as one of their guides. Lewis went on to become an important activist during the Civil Rights Movement.

While working on his 2008 reelection campaign, Lewis told his telecommunications and technology policy aide, Andrew Aydin, about The Montgomery Story and its influence. Aydin tracked down a copy of the comic (which had long since fallen out of print), and thought that Lewis' own story would make strong material for comic book treatment:

Once he told me about it, and I connected those dots that a comic book had a meaningful impact on the early days of the Civil Rights Movement, and in particular on young people, it just seemed self-evident. If it had happened before, why couldn't it happen again?

Aydin repeatedly suggested that Lewis himself write a comic book, and eventually Lewis decided to commit to the project, on the condition that Aydin write it with him. The award-winning March trilogy, written by Lewis & Aydin, illustrated by Nate Powell, and published beginning in 2013 by Top Shelf Productions, is the result.

== Awards ==
Top Shelf's authorized re-issue of Martin Luther King and the Montgomery Story won the 2014 Glyph Comics Award for Best Reprint Publication.

== See also ==
- Stride Toward Freedom: The Montgomery Story
- Civil rights movement in popular culture
- Portrayal of black people in comics
