= All-Negro Comics =

1947 American comic book

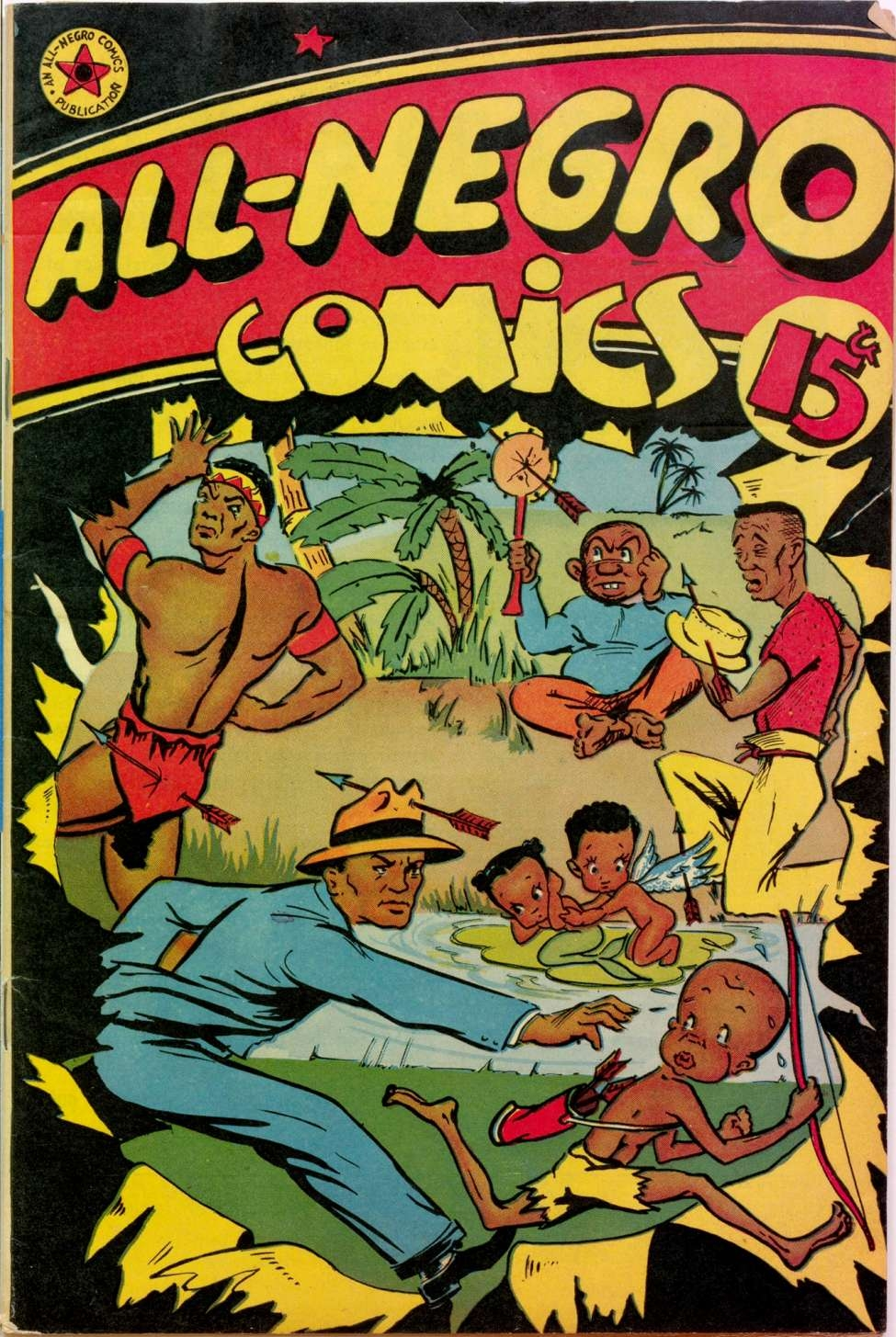
- All-Negro Comics #1 (June 1947). Cover artist unknown. Clockwise from top left: Lion Man, Snake Oil, Sugarfoot, Bubba, Ace Harlem. Center: The Little Dew Dillies

Publication information
- Publisher: All-Negro Comics, Inc.
- Format: Anthology
- Publication date: 1947
- No. of issues: 1
- Main character(s): Ace Harlem; Lion Man

Creative team
- Artist(s): John Terrell; George J. Evans Jr.

All-Negro Comics is a 1947 American comic book that represents the first known comics magazine written and drawn solely by African-American writers and artists. Edited by Orrin Cromwell Evans, the comic anthology published a single issue with small circulation and sales.

== Publication history ==
African-American journalist Orrin Cromwell Evans was "the first black writer to cover general assignments for a mainstream white newspaper in the United States" when he joined the staff of the Philadelphia Record. Evans was a member of the NAACP and a strong proponent of racial equality. After the Record closed in 1947, Evans thought he could use the comic-book medium to further highlight "the splendid history of Negro journalism".

Evans partnered with former Record editor Harry T. Saylor, Record sports editor Bill Driscoll, and two others to found the Philadelphia publishing company All-Negro Comics, Inc., with himself as president.

In mid-1947, the company published one issue of All-Negro Comics, a 48-page, standard-sized comic book with a typical glossy color cover and newsprint interior. It was copyrighted July 15, 1947, with a June 1947 issue date, and its press run and distribution are unknown. Unlike other comic books of the time, it sold for 15 cents rather than 10.

As writer Tom Christopher described, Evans

...co-created the features in the comic along with the artists, who included his brother, George J. Evans Jr.; two other Philadelphia cartoonists, one of whom was John Terrell, the other named Cooper; and a Baltimore artist who signed his work Cravat. The cartoonists probably wrote their own scripts, and there was further editorial input by Bill Driscoll.

As one cultural historian notes of the era, "[W]hile there were a few heroic images of blacks created by blacks, such as the Jive Gray comic strip and All-Negro Comics, these images did not circulate outside of pre-civil rights segregated black communities."

Evans attempted to publish a second issue but was unable to purchase the newsprint required. One writer believes Evans was blocked from doing so by prejudiced distributors, as well as from competing, white-owned publishers (such as Parents Magazine Press and Fawcett Comics) which began producing their own black-themed titles.

The Official Overstreet Comic Book Price Guide, a standard reference, considers the single issue "rare" and notes, "Seldom found in fine or mint condition; many copies have brown pages."

In 2022, comics writer Chris Robinson successfully funded a Kickstarter to remaster and reprint the comic. The reprinted edition won an Eisner Award for Best Archival Collection/Project—Comic Books in 2024.

== Contents ==
Time magazine in 1947 called All-Negro Comics "the first to be drawn by Negro artists and peopled entirely by Negro characters". In describing lead feature "Ace Harlem", it said, "The villains were a couple of zoot-suited, jive-talking Negro muggers, whose presence in anyone else's comics might have brought up complaints of racial 'distortion.' Since it was all in the family, Evans thought no Negro readers would mind." The protagonist "Ace Harlem" was an African-American police detective; the characters in the "Lion Man and Bubba" feature were meant to inspire black people's pride in their African heritage.

=== Stories ===
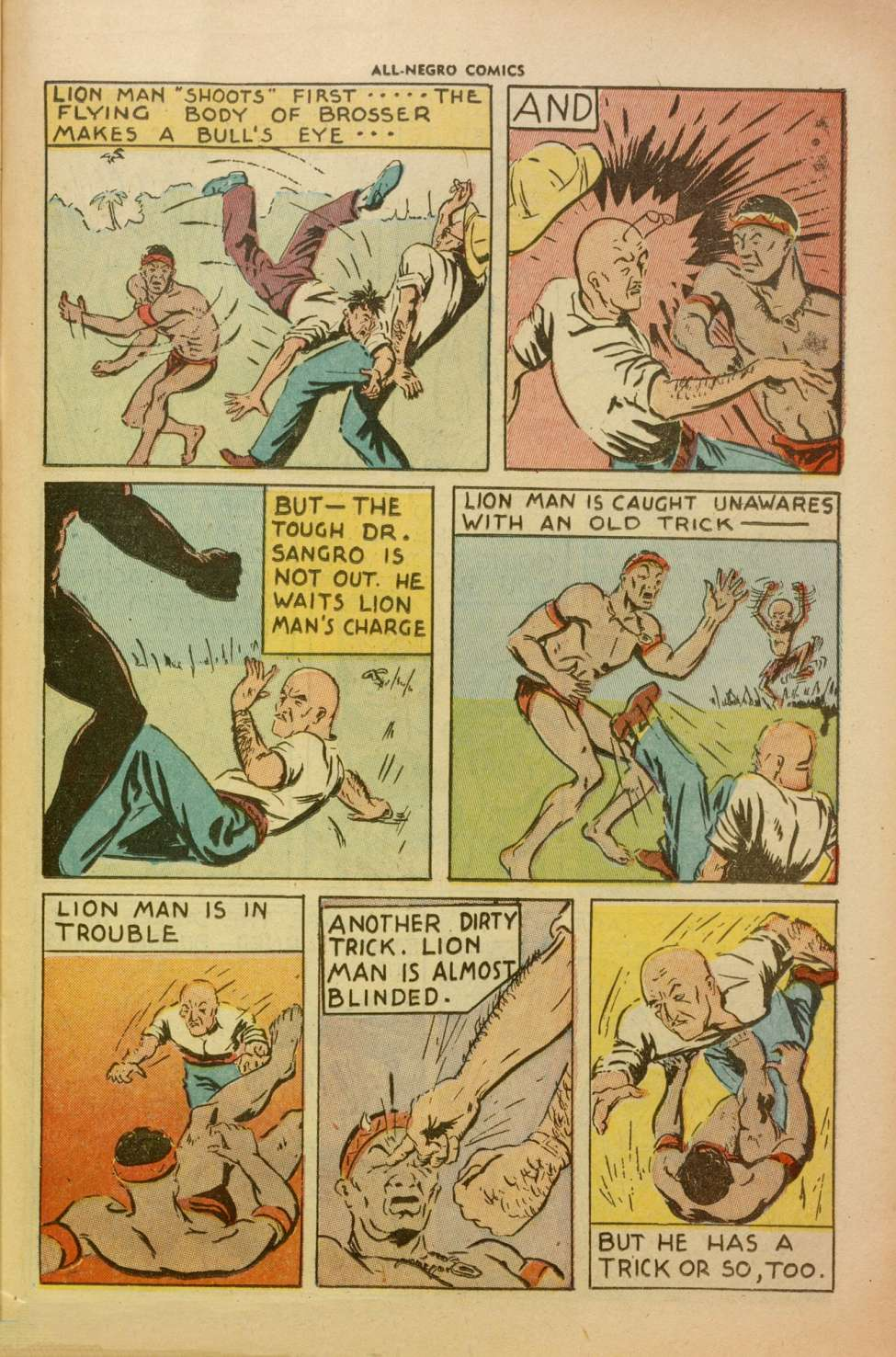
"Lion Man" page from All-Negro Comics #1. Art by George J. Evans Jr.

- One-page introductory editorial, "All-Negro Comics: Presenting Another First in Negro History"
- "Ace Harlem", a detective feature drawn by John Terrell
- "The Little Dew Dillies", a children's feature starring cherub-like creatures only babies can see and talk to, drawn by Cooper
- "Ezekiel's Manhunt", a two-page boy's-adventure text story
- "Lion Man and Bubba", starring a college-educated African American sent by the United Nations on a mission to a uranium deposit on Africa's Gold Coast, where he adopted the mischievous orphan Bubba. Drawn by George J. Evans, Jr. (no relation to Caucasian comic-book and comic-strip artist George Evans). One modern-day writer said Lion Man "wore the obligatory leotard costume of the comic hero", though the comic's cover and interior pages depict him in loin cloth.
- "Hep Chicks on Parade", spot-illustration gags with highly stylized women wearing exaggerated fashions, signed "Len"
- "Lil' Eggie", by Terrell, about henpecked husband Egbert and his wife
- "Sugarfoot", a humor feature, drawn by Cravat, starring traveling musicians Sugarfoot and Snake Oil, who try to woo a farmer's daughter. Evans' editorial said the feature's creators hoped "to recapture the almost lost humor of the loveable wandering Negro minstrel of the past."
- "Remember — Crime Doesn't Pay, Kids!", a one-page public service announcement and next-issue promo, with Ace Harlem

== See also ==
- Portrayal of black people in comics
- African characters in comics
- Martin Luther King and the Montgomery Story
- Black Panther (character)
- Lobo (Dell Comics)
- Real Deal
- Race film
- Blaxploitation
