= Andrew Aydin =

American comics writer (born 1983)

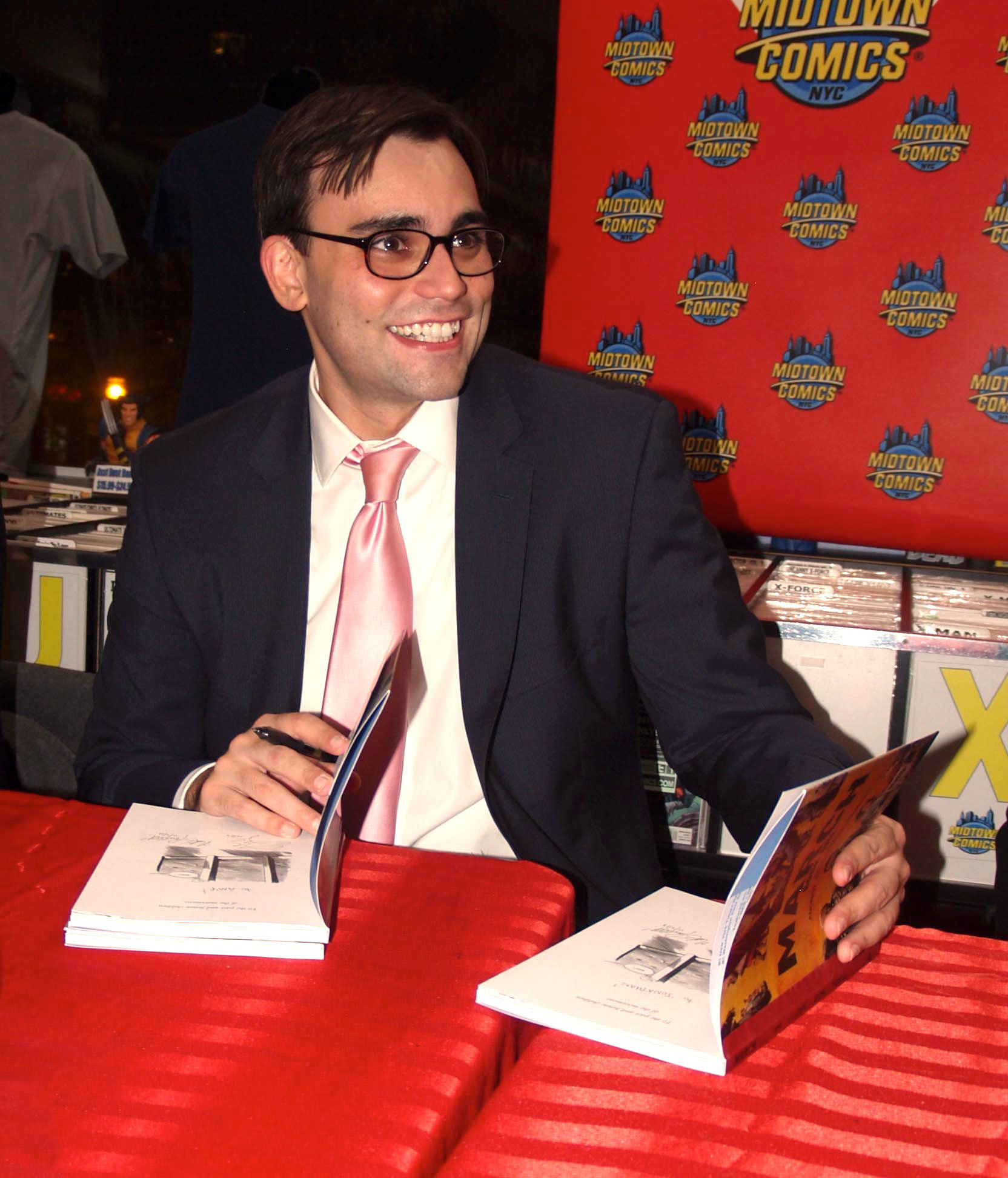
- Aydin at a book signing for March: Book One at Midtown Comics in Manhattan
- Born: August 25, 1983 (age 43); Atlanta, Georgia, U.S.
- Education: Trinity College (BA); Georgetown University (MA)
- Occupations: Political aide, Graphic novelist
- Awards: Inkpot Award (2017)

Andrew Aydin (born August 25, 1983) is an American comics writer, known as the Digital Director & Policy Advisor to Georgia congressman John Lewis, and co-author, with Lewis, of March, Lewis' #1 New York Times bestselling autobiographical graphic novel trilogy.

== Early life ==
Aydin was born in Atlanta, Georgia. He attended the Lovett School in Atlanta, Georgia, earned a Bachelor of Arts from Trinity College and a Master of Arts in public policy from Georgetown University.

== Career ==
After college, Aydin served as District Aide to Representative John B. Larson (D-CT) and as Special Assistant to Connecticut Lieutenant Governor Kevin Sullivan.

In 2007, Aydin began working for Georgia congressman John Lewis. In the summer of 2008, while on Rep. Lewis' reelection campaign, Aydin learned that Lewis had been inspired as a young man by a classic 1950s comic book, Martin Luther King and the Montgomery Story.

Aydin wrote his graduate thesis on the history and impact of Martin Luther King and the Montgomery Story. Until 2012, no history of Martin Luther King and the Montgomery Story had been written, and most versions of how the comic was created listed Al Capp as the actual creator. As part of his graduate degree at Georgetown University, Aydin wrote the first long-form history of The Montgomery Story as his graduate thesis. With the help of Carlow University Professor Dr. Sylvia Rhor and comic book icon Eddie Campbell, Aydin established most of what we know about the comic's creation and use. In August 2013, Aydin published a shortened version of his thesis as the feature article in Creative Loafing's award-winning "Future of Nonviolence" issue, which was guest-edited by Lewis and Aydin.

Aydin has appeared as a guest on The Rachel Maddow Show, Morning Joe, National Public Radio, CBS This Morning, CNN, and the BBC.

Aydin served as Digital Director & Policy Advisor to Representative Lewis in his Washington, D.C. office until Lewis's passing in 2020.

== March trilogy ==
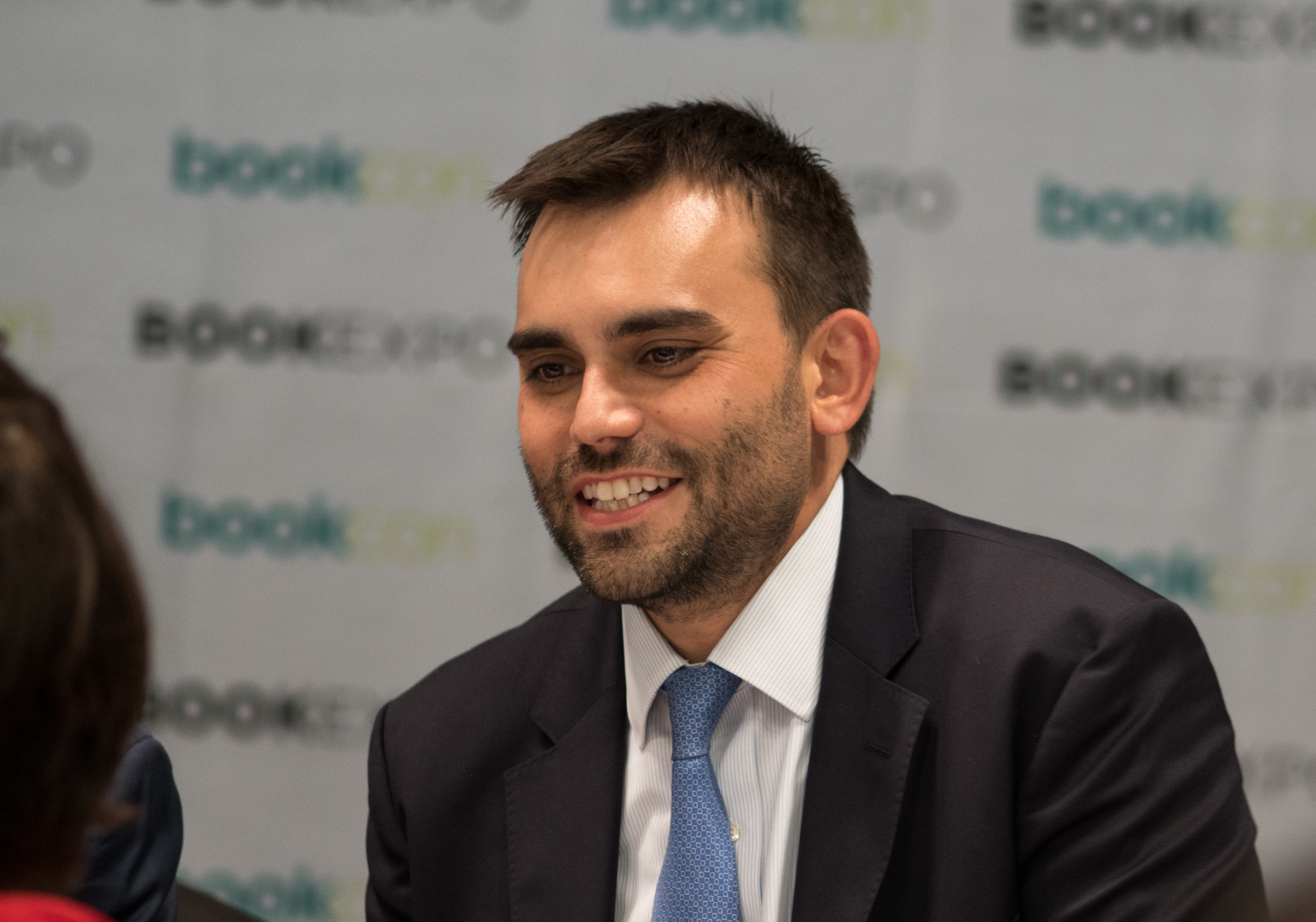
Aydin at BookExpo America in 2018

In August 2013, Top Shelf Productions published the first book in the March trilogy, a black and white graphic novel about the Civil Rights Movement, told through the perspective of Lewis, written by Lewis and Aydin, and illustrated and lettered by Nate Powell. The book had its genesis in Lewis' 2008 reelection campaign, when Lewis told Aydin about The Montgomery Story and its influence on the civil rights movement. Aydin, who had been reading comics since his grandmother bought him a copy of Uncanny X-Men #317 off a Piggly Wiggly spinner rack when he was eight years old, found a digital copy of the book on the Internet and spent years tracking down an original print copy on eBay. The Montgomery Story directly influenced on the creation of March.

President Bill Clinton has said of Congressman Lewis that, through March, "he brings a whole new generation with him across the Edmund Pettus Bridge, from a past of clenched fists into a future of outstretched hands." Apple CEO Tim Cook has said that March is "a very unique way to present what is probably the most important story of my entire lifetime. My hope is that everyone reads this, and I would love to see the day that it is required reading in every school."

March: Book One holds an average 9.4 out of 10 rating at the review aggregator website Comic Book Roundup, based on five reviews. In addition to receiving positive reviews, it won numerous awards and accolades, was selected for college-level reading lists and by first-year reading programs in 2014 at Michigan State University, Georgia State University, and Marquette University. March: Book One received an "Author Honor" from the American Library Association's 2014 Coretta Scott King Book Awards. Book One also became the first graphic novel to win a Robert F. Kennedy Book Award, receiving a "Special Recognition" bust in 2014.

March: Book Two was released in 2015 and became both a New York Times bestseller for paperback graphic novels and Washington Post bestseller for paperback nonfiction books. At San Diego Comic Con in July 2016, March: Book Two won the Will Eisner Comic Industry Award for "Best Reality Based Work."

The release of March: Book Three in August 2016 brought all three volumes into the top 3 slots of the New York Times bestseller list for graphic novels for 6 consecutive weeks. In November 2016, March: Book Three was awarded the National Book Award in Young People's Literature, becoming the first graphic novel to receive a National Book Award. In January 2017, the American Library Association awarded March: Book Three the 2017 Printz Award, the Coretta Scott King Award, the YALSA Award for Excellence in Nonfiction, and the Sibert Medal. It was the first time a single book won four A.L.A. awards. The trilogy received the Carter G. Woodson Book Award in 2017.

In May 2016, NYC Public Schools announced that the March trilogy was added to the systemwide 8th Grade "Passport to Social Studies" curriculum. In October 2016, Atlanta Public Schools announced the March trilogy's addition to its English curriculum.

Aydin and Lewis collaborated in a 2020 feature by The Bitter Southerner, which highlighted how March embodied Lewis and Aydin’s shared commitment to nonviolence and civic activism. Following Lewis’s death later that year, The Atlanta Journal-Constitution noted that the trilogy had played a significant role in inspiring a new generation of activists and was widely referenced during the 2020 racial justice protests in the United States.

== Recent work ==
In 2025, chef and humanitarian José Andrés announced a collaboration with Aydin on a new DC Comics series titled Taste of Justice, featuring Aquaman and Superman. Aydin also worked with Andrés’s nonprofit, World Central Kitchen, helping bring food aid into western North Carolina in the aftermath of Hurricane Helene.

As a founder of Appalachia Comics Project, Aydin is a co-creator of Islands in the Sky, a compendium of comics telling the stories of Hurricane Helene survivors, which he crowdfunded on Kickstarter.

== Awards and honors ==
2013

- Gem Award for Independent Graphic Novel of the Year

2014

- Coretta Scott King Book Award Author Honor
- YALSA Top Ten Great Graphic Novels for Teens
- Robert F. Kennedy Book Award – Special Recognition
- Nominated for two Eisner Awards: Best Publication for Teens and Best Reality-Based Work
- Nominated for two Harvey Awards: Best Graphic Album – Original and Best Biographical, Historical, or Journalistic Presentation

2015

- Illinois Literary Heritage Award

2016

- National Book Award for Young People's Literature
- Will Eisner Comic Industry Award – Best Reality-Based Work
- Harvey Award – Best Biographical, Historical, or Journalistic Presentation

2017

- Michael L. Printz Award
- Robert F. Sibert Informational Book Medal
- Coretta Scott King Book Award Author Winner
- YALSA Award for Excellence in Nonfiction for Young Adults
- Walter Dean Myers Award
- Georgia Author of the Year
- Will Eisner Comic Industry Award – Best Reality-Based Work
- Harvey Award – Best Original Graphic Publication for Younger Readers

2018

- Chairman’s Award – Democratic Party of Georgia

2022

- Will Eisner Comic Industry Award – Best Graphic Memoir
