= Negro Romance =

1950s romance comic book

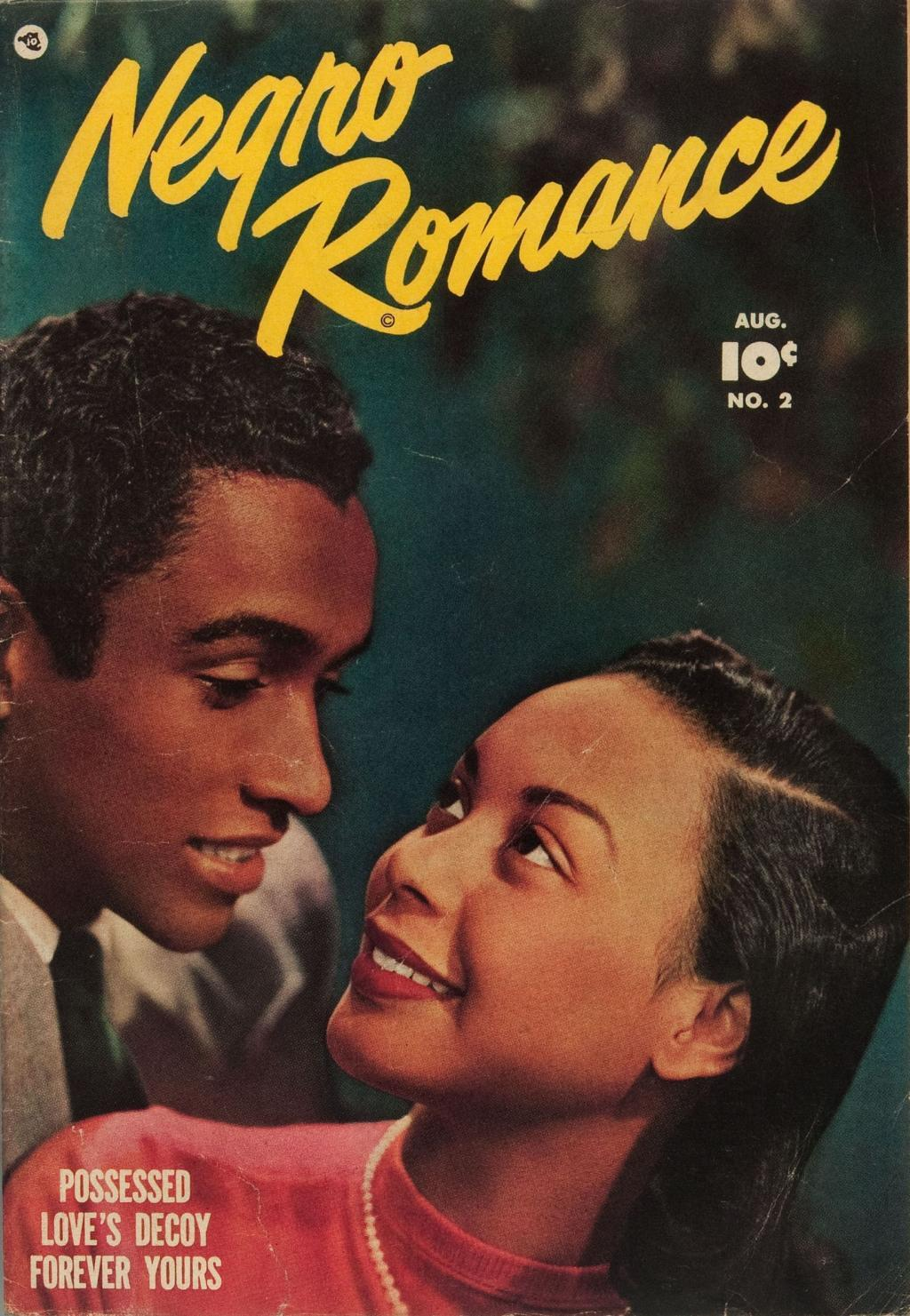
Negro Romance depicts characters who conformed to mainstream ideals of attractiveness in the 1950s, rather than stereotypical African-American depictions

Negro Romance is a romance comic book published in the 1950s by Fawcett Comics. It is remarkable in eschewing African-American stereotypes, telling stories interchangeable with those told about white characters. The comic even mentions college, which was relatively uncommon in the 1950s, even more so among African-Americans. Negro Romance ran for only three issues and the first issue was published in June 1950. The third and last issue was published in October, 1950.

== History ==
Negro Romance was developed as an experiment in expanding into the romance market, conceived by editor Roy Ald, who was European-American, and written by him without credit. It was illustrated by Alvin Hollingsworth, the first African-American artist hired by Fawcett.

== See also ==
- All-Negro Comics
- Portrayal of black people in comics
