= Orrin C. Evans =

American journalist

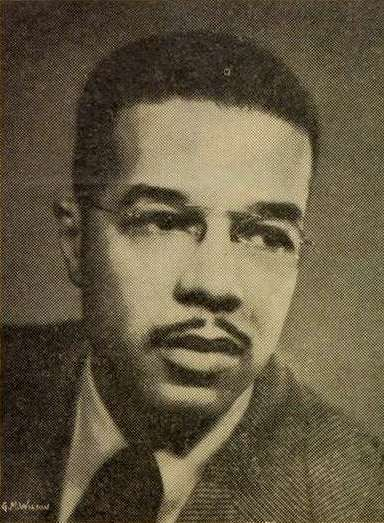
- Evans in 1947
- Born: Orrin Cromwell Evans; 1902; Steelton, Pennsylvania
- Died: August 6, 1971 (aged 68–69); Mercy-Douglass Hospital, Philadelphia, Pennsylvania
- Occupations: journalist, comic book publisher
- Known for: All-Negro Comics
- Spouse: Florence
- Children: Hope
- Parent(s): George J. Evans, Sr. and Maude Wilson Evans
- Family: George J. Evans, Jr. (brother)

Orrin Cromwell Evans (1902–1971) was a pioneering African-American journalist and comic book publisher. Considered "the first black writer to cover general assignments for a mainstream white newspaper in the United States," he also published All-Negro Comics, the first known comics magazine written and drawn solely by African-American writers and artists.

== Biography ==
=== Early life ===
Evans' father was light-skinned and could "pass" for white, but his dark-skinned mother sometimes had to pretend to be the family maid when strangers came to visit. Young Orrin was forced to confront racism at an early age due to his parents' difficult juggling act. Evans dropped out of school in eighth grade.

=== Journalism ===
Evans' began work in journalism as a teenager at the well-regarded African-American newspaper the Philadelphia Tribune

In the early 1930, Evans became the only African-American on staff at The Philadelphia Record, where he wrote about segregation in the armed services during World War II. At The Record he faced death threats and discrimination, including being removed from a Charles Lindbergh press conference because of the color of his skin. In addition to The Record, Evans wrote for The Chicago Defender, The Philadelphia Independent, and The Crisis, the journal of the NAACP.

=== All-Negro Comics ===
A strong proponent of racial equality, Evans thought he could reach a wider audience with a comic book. When The Record closed after an extended strike action in 1947, Evans partnered with former Record editor Harry T. Saylor, Record sports editor Bill Driscoll and two others to found the Philadelphia publishing company All-Negro Comics, Inc., with himself as president. In mid-1947, the company published the only known issue of All-Negro Comics, a 48-page, standard-sized comic book with a typical glossy color cover and newsprint interior. The comic's press run and distribution are unknown, and as one cultural historian notes of the era, "[W]hile there were a few heroic images of blacks created by blacks, such as the Jive Gray comic strip and All-Negro Comics, these images did not circulate outside of pre-civil rights segregated black communities."

As writer Tom Christopher described, Evans

...co-created the features in the comic along with the artists, who included his brother, George J. Evans Jr.; two other Philadelphia cartoonists, one of whom was John Terrell, the other named Cooper; and a Baltimore artist who signed his work Cravat. The cartoonists probably wrote their own scripts, and there was further editorial input by Bill Driscoll.

Time magazine in 1947 described the villains in the lead feature, "Ace Harlem," as "a couple of zoot-suited, jive-talking Negro muggers, whose presence in anyone else's comics might have brought up complaints of racial 'distortion.' Since it was all in the family, Evans thought no Negro readers would mind." The protagonist of "Ace Harlem," however, was an African-American police detective; the characters in the "Lion Man and Bubba" feature were meant to inspire black people's pride in their African heritage.

Evans attempted to publish a second issue but was unable to purchase the newsprint required — which many believe he was blocked from doing by prejudiced distributors, as well as from competing, white-owned publishers (such as Parents Magazine Press and Fawcett Comics) which began producing their own black-themed titles.

=== Later career ===
Orrin later worked art the Chester Times, and then the Philadelphia Bulletin from 1962 until his death in 1971. He was deeply involved in Philadelphia-area journalism associations the Philadelphia Press Association, and was honored by Urban League of Pennsylvania. As a journalist, he was a fixture at National Urban League and NAACP conventions.

== Awards ==
In 1971, shortly before his death, Evans was honored at the annual NAACP convention in Minneapolis and a scholarship was created in his name.

In 2011 he and his brother were posthumously given the ECBACC Pioneer Lifetime Achievement Award for the creation of All-Negro Comics. In 2014, Evans was elected to the Will Eisner Award Hall of Fame for his work as president of All-Negro Comics.

== See also ==
- Martin Luther King and the Montgomery Story
