= Fellowship of Reconciliation (United States) =

Nonprofit peace and justice organization

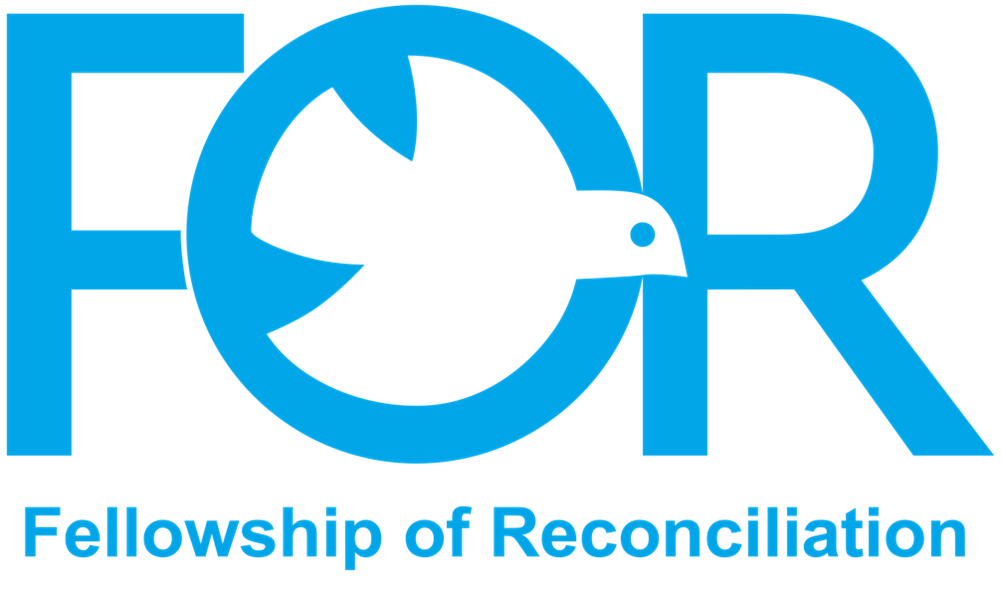
- Abbreviation: FOR USA
- Formation: 1915; 111 years ago
- Founders: A. J. Muste, Jane Addams, Bishop Paul Jones, and 65 other pacifists
- Type: Nonprofit peace and justice organization
- Headquarters: P.O. Box 271, Nyack, NY 10960 USA
- Location: Stony Point, New York
- Executive Director: Ariel Gold
- Website: forusa.org

United States Fellowship of Reconciliation (FOR USA) was founded in 1915 by sixty-eight pacifists, including A. J. Muste, Jane Addams and Bishop Paul Jones, and claims to be the "largest, oldest interfaith peace and justice organization in the United States." Norman Thomas, at first skeptical of its program, joined in 1916 and would become the group's president. Its programs and projects involve domestic as well as international issues, and generally emphasize nonviolent alternatives to conflict and the rights of conscience. Unlike the U.K. movements, it is an interfaith body, though its historic roots are in Christianity. Both the FOR in the United States and similarly named organizations in other countries are affiliated with the International Fellowship of Reconciliation.

== History ==
=== Origins in World War I and activities through the 1940s ===
FOR in the USA was formed initially in opposition to the entry of the United States into World War I. The American Civil Liberties Union developed out of FOR's conscientious objectors program and the Emergency Committee for Civil Liberties.

In 1918, FOR and the American Federation of Labor formed Brookwood Labor College, which lasted until 1937. Also in January 1918, FOR began publication of The World Tomorrow, with Norman Thomas as its first editor.

National Secretary Paul Jones wrote in 1921 that the Fellowship of Reconciliation was established as one vehicle to aid in the application of Christian principles to "every problem of life." In addition to the impossibility of harmonizing war with "the way of Christ," Jones stated that members of the organization had come to believe in the parallel necessity of a "reorganization of Society as will establish it on a Christian basis, so that no individual may be exploited for the profit or pleasure of another." Rather than the FOR itself serving as the primary fulcrum for this activity, "in general the members of the Fellowship endeavor to work out their aims through existing organizations and discussion," Jones noted.

John Nevin Sayre was active in FOR between 1924 and 1967, and was its chairman from 1935 to 1940.

From 1935 onwards, the US branch of FOR published a magazine, Fellowship. Fellowship's contributors included Mohandas Gandhi, Vera Brittain, Norman Thomas, Oswald Garrison Villard, E. Stanley Jones, Walter P. Reuther and Muriel Lester.

In 1947, FOR and the Congress of Racial Equality, or CORE, which had been founded by FOR staffers James Farmer and George Houser along with Bernice Fisher, sponsored the Journey of Reconciliation, the first Freedom Ride against southern segregation. It was organised to test compliance with Morgan v. Virginia (1946), in which the Supreme Court held that racial segregation on interstate buses was unconstitutional.

=== Civil Rights Movement in the 1950s and fighting poverty in the 1960s ===
In 1954, China was facing famine and the United States was enjoying surplus harvests, so the FOR organized the Surplus Food for China campaign to convince the government to send food to the Chinese.

In 1955 and 1956, Glenn E. Smiley, a white Methodist minister, was assigned by the FOR to assist the Rev. Martin Luther King Jr. in the Montgomery bus boycott. The two, sitting behind the Rev. Ralph Abernathy, were seatmates on the first interracial bus ride in Montgomery. Smiley and FOR executive secretary and director of publications Alfred Hassler later spearheaded FOR's production and distribution of the 1957 comic book Martin Luther King and the Montgomery Story.

In 1957, the organization's headquarters moved to Shadowcliff in Upper Nyack, New York. Shadowcliff was listed on the National Register of Historic Places in 2014.

In the 1960s, FOR launched "Shelters for the Shelterless" and built real shelters for homeless people, in response to increasing public demand for fallout shelters. FOR members such as Hassler made contact with the Vietnamese Buddhist pacifist movement and sponsored a world tour by Buddhist monk Thich Nhat Hanh.

=== From the arms race in the 1970s to gun control in the 1990s ===
In the 1970s, FOR founded Dai Dong, a transnational project linking war, environmental problems, poverty and other social issues, involving thousands of scientists around the world. They sought to reverse the Cold War and the arms race with campaigns, marches, educational projects and civil disobedience, and opposed the death penalty in a concerted campaign with ACLU.

Beginning in 1975, FOR supported Lee Stern as he helped found Children's Creative Response to Violence (CCRV) and the Alternatives to Violence Project (AVP). CCRV has had serious impact on K-8 education in the United States including introduction of the Peer Mediation Program. AVP seeks to build beloved community in prisons. For more than forty years it has worked with prison inmates to build spread peaceful community life in prison. In recent years, AVP has been the basis for building beloved communities in the Great Lakes Region of Africa.

In the 1980s, FOR took the lead in initiating the Nuclear Freeze campaign in cooperation with other groups. They initiated a US-USSR reconciliation program, which included people-to-people exchanges, artistic and educational resources, teach-ins and conferences. They led nonviolence training seminars in the Philippines prior to the nonviolent overthrow of the Marcos dictatorship.

In the 1990s, the organization sent delegations of religious leaders and peace activists to Iraq to try to prevent war and later, to see the massive devastation caused by the economic sanctions imposed upon Iraq. They initiated a "Start the Healing" campaign in response to escalating levels of gun violence in the United States, and FOR is an organizational and founding member of the Coalition to Stop Gun Violence, which advocates gun control. FOR initiated the "Bosnian Student Project," which brought students from the former Yugoslavia out of war zones and into US homes and schools, and later started the International Reconciliation Work Camp Project. They also worked to get the US military to withdraw from Panama.

=== 2000s: “I Will Not Kill” campaign and visiting Iran ===
FOR has most recently been active in advocating for the demilitarization of US foreign policy. It works to counter military recruitment of young people in the United States – through FOR's "I Will Not Kill" campaign, and in partnership with the Ruckus Society, the War Resisters League, and others in the Not Your Soldier project. A July 2016 action in Minneapolis, in response to the death of Philando Castile, included the statement "Among their demands are the dismantling of the police department... disarming, defunding, demilitarizing, and disbanding police."

Particular areas of geographic focus have been the Middle East – especially Israel–Palestine and Iran – and Latin America and the Caribbean – especially Colombia and Puerto Rico. In the Middle East, FOR's Interfaith Peace-Builders program (now independent) builds relationships between Israeli, Palestinian, and North American peace activists. Founded in 2005, its Iran program has drawn on FOR's legacy of sending delegations to nations that are labeled as enemies by the US government, and is working to prevent war and create peace-centered connections between ordinary citizens of both countries. In the Americas, FOR has a permanent five-person Colombia peace team of volunteers who provide human rights accompaniment to endangered civilians and support locally organized peace initiatives. FOR was also instrumental in the movement to pressure the US Navy to stop using Vieques as a bombing range.

=== 2017: Anti-Israel workshop controversy ===
In 2017 the non-profit The Israel Group submitted complaints to the Los Angeles Unified School District (LAUSD) and the Orange County Department of Education regarding a workshop, “Learning About Islam and the Arab World”, that the Greater L.A. chapter of the FORUSA presented in the school districts. FOR has also been an active promoter of the Boycott, Divestment, and Sanctions (BDS) movement, a perspective which informs its efforts to influence educators about the Middle East. One attendee of the workshop told the Jewish Journal, "We are being told that the Palestinians are the victims and the Jews are the oppressors, categorically and totally... And we are being told that Hamas is not a terrorist group; Hamas is a noble entity defending the rights of Palestinians.” In a news release from the Simon Wiesenthal Center, the human rights organization further noted that "FORUS is closely aligned with CAIR, a US-based organization that has been linked to Hamas terrorist group."

Greater public awareness followed the workshop, with groups such as the Anti-Defamation League (ADL) speaking out, saying the workshop materials featured "substantial misrepresentations and distortions of established historical facts, omissions of relevant facts, and inflammatory language". Democratic Congressman Brad Sherman contacted LAUSD. After reviewing the workshop's handouts, Sherman wrote, “[The Workshop] material is not just false, but is anti-Semitic and should have raised immediate red flags with LAUSD… I am concerned that LAUSD would promote an education program on the Middle East established by the Fellowship of Reconciliation (FORUSA), an organization who openly supports Boycott, Divestment, and Sanctions (BDS), a highly polarizing movement that singles out Israel, the only democracy in the Middle East, and has led to anti-Semitic hostility. The BDS movement is adverse to the foreign policy of the United States.”

== See also ==
- Devere Allen
