= Alfred Hassler =

American editor

- Born: 1910; Allentown, Pennsylvania, U.S.
- Died: June 5, 1991 (aged 80–81); Good Samaritan Hospital, Suffern, New York, U.S.
- Education: Brooklyn Polytechnic Institute; Columbia University
- Occupation(s): author and anti-war activist
- Spouse: Dorothy

Alfred Hassler (1910–1991) was an anti-war author and activist during World War II and the Vietnam War. He worked with the U.S. branch of the Fellowship of Reconciliation (FOR USA), a peace and social justice organization, from 1942 to 1974.

== Early life and education ==
Hassler was born in Allentown, Pennsylvania in 1910. He grew up in New York City and attended Brooklyn Polytechnic Institute in Brooklyn, and studied journalism at Columbia University.

== Career ==
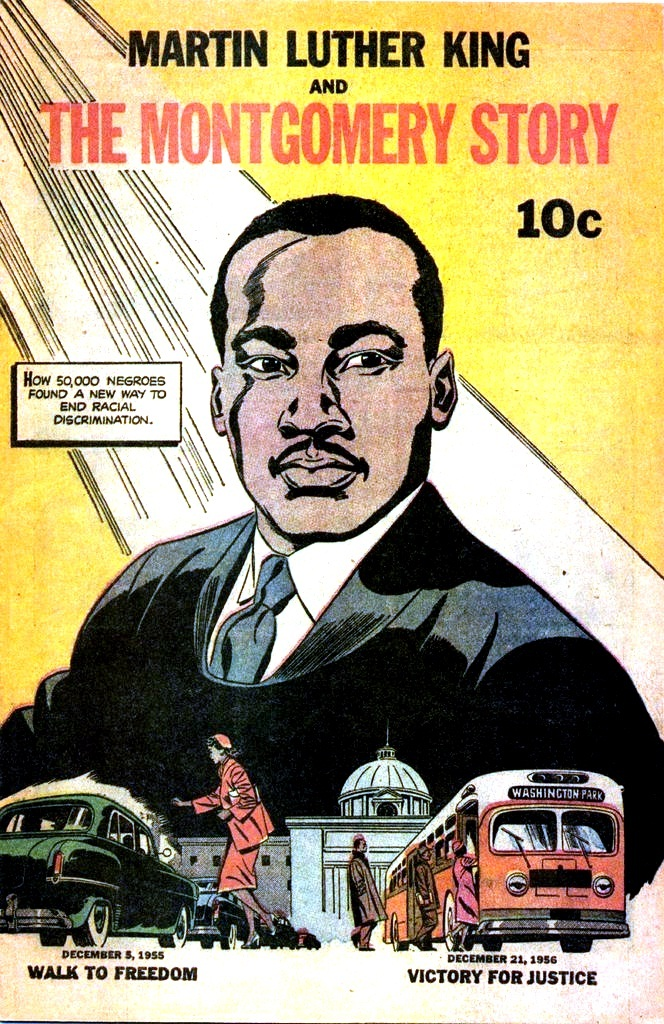
In 1957, Hassler co-authored Martin Luther King and the Montgomery Story.

Hassler worked as a journalist at The Leader-Observer in Queens and then at American Baptist Publications in Philadelphia.

In 1942, Hassler was appointed editor of Fellowship, a pacifist publication published by FOR USA. He was subsequently imprisoned for his stance as a conscientious objector during World War II. While in prison, he authored, Diary of a Self-Made Convict.

In 1957, he co-authored Martin Luther King and the Montgomery Story, an advocacy comic book published by FOR USA.

The following year, in 1958, Hassler was appointed executive secretary of FOR USA. Hassler led FOR USA delegations to Vietnam in 1965 and 1967 during the Vietnam War, during which he began a collaboration and friendship with Thích Nhất Hạnh.

In 1969, Hassler founded the Dai Dong Project, which linked war, environmental issues, and poverty, and became the president of the International Confederation for Disarmament and Peace.

In 1970, he published Saigon, U.S.A., Hassler supported the Vietnamese Buddhists, arguing they could form a nonviolent "third force" for peace independent of both the South Vietnamese and North Vietnamese governments.

In 1974, Hassler retired from his position with FOR USA. With his wife Dorothy, he co-founded a retirement community in Almeria, Spain. In the 1980s, he returned to New York City.

== Death ==
Hassler died of cancer on June 5, 1991, at Good Samaritan Hospital in Suffern, New York, at the age of 81.

== In popular culture ==
In 2013, Hassler, Thích Nhất Hạnh, and Chân Không, were the subject of a comic book and animated feature documentary film, The Secret of The 5 Powers.
