= Glenn E. Smiley =

American Civil rights activist (1910–1993)

- Born: April 19, 1910; Loraine, Texas, U.S.
- Died: September 14, 1993 (aged 83); Glendale, California, U.S.
- Education: University of Redlands

Glenn Smiley (April 19, 1910 – September 14, 1993) was a white civil rights consultant and leader. He closely studied the doctrine of Mahatma Gandhi and became convinced that racism and segregation were most likely to be overcome without the use of violence, and began studying and teaching peaceful tactics. As an employee of the Fellowship of Reconciliation (FOR), he visited Martin Luther King Jr. in Montgomery, Alabama in 1956 during the Montgomery bus boycott where Smiley advised King and his associates on nonviolent tactics, and was able to convince King that nonviolence was a feasible solution to racial tension. Smiley, together with Bayard Rustin and others, helped convince King and his associates that complete nonviolence and nonviolent direct action were the most effective methods and tools to use during protest. After the Civil Rights Movement, Smiley continued to employ nonviolence and worked for several organizations promoting peace in South American countries. Just three years before his 1993 death, Smiley opened the King Center in Los Angeles.

== Early life ==
Glenn Smiley was born in Loraine, Texas on April 19, 1910. He attended several universities, including McMurry College, Southwestern University, and the University of Arizona before graduating from University of Redlands.

== Career ==
Smiley worked as the preacher to a Methodist congregation in Arizona, and later California for 14 years. After his work in ministry, Smiley went on to work for several organizations, including the Congress of Racial Equality (CORE) in 1942, and later served as the national field secretary of the Fellowship of Reconciliation (FOR). When World War II broke out and the time came for Smiley to enlist in armed services, he refused to participate. He also opted not to take the clergy exception, which was available to him as a minister. These actions classified him as a conscientious objector and he went on to serve time in prison in 1945 for his lack of compliance. Smiley believed that prison is only secondary to war in dehumanization and violence. In Smiley's sixties, he suffered from 44 small strokes. These strokes greatly affected his memory and speech for 15 years, until one day he woke up and seemed to be completely back to his normal self and even went on to give 103 major lectures.

During his work in ministry in the 1940s, Smiley developed an interest for the methods of Mahatma Gandhi and his methods of self-discipline and nonviolence. From these studies, he developed his theory that nonviolence was the most effective way to combat discrimination. Smiley first used his theory of nonviolence in the late 1940s when he attempted to spur integration of tearooms of department stores in the Los Angeles area. Smiley went on to have a professional relationship with Martin Luther King Jr., in which he advised King on nonviolence tactics and emphasized the importance of nonviolence in the success of the Civil Rights Movement. Smiley was already impressed with Dr. King's leadership, but was critical of King for having a bodyguard. In a letter that Smiley had written to some of his friends, he was quoted writing, "If King can really be won to a faith of nonviolence there is no end to what he can do. Soon he will be able to direct the movement by sheer force of being the symbol of resistance." Smiley also persuaded King that there needs to be an active dialogue between the white and black ministers in the South. King sent Smiley around the South preaching the doctrine to church congregations and civil-rights groups, and nonviolence quickly became a binding premise of King's Southern Christian Leadership Conference.

During the Montgomery bus boycott, Smiley participated by spreading news of the boycott to his congregation. Smiley was also charged with appealing to Southern white people, and accessed group meetings of organizations such as the Ku Klux Klan and the WCC. He is quoted saying, "my assignment was to make every contact possible in the white community." After the resolution of Browder v. Gayle on December 17, 1956, it was ruled by the Supreme Court that segregation on city busses is unconstitutional; the MIA developed a set of guidelines to help black residents successfully ride on the newly integrated busses. Smiley, along with Martin Luther King Jr. and other MIA leaders, was an integral author of these new guidelines.

After the Supreme Court's ruling in Browder v. Gayle Smiley rode with Martin Luther King Jr. and Reverend Ralph D. Abernathy on the first day that bus segregation ended in Montgomery. Smiley later said that he took the bus ride to get a reaction, as his organizational work had been urging nonviolence. Later during the student sit-in movement during the 1960s, Smiley was a strong supporter and urged the students to attend a conference at Shaw University that would go on to be the birthplace of the Student Nonviolent Coordinating Committee (SNCC).

In the 1960s, Smiley founded the Methodist-inspired organization called Justice-Action-Peace Latin America, which was responsible for organizing seminars on nonviolence in Latin American countries between the years of 1967 and the early 1970s. Smiley traveled to South American countries, where he taught nonviolence during the time he worked under the National Council of Churches and the National Council of Catholic Bishops. Shortly before his death, Smiley founded the Martin Luther King Center for Nonviolence in Los Angeles in 1990 to further his lifelong philosophy of nonviolence. Speaking about the King Center, Smiley stressed "nonviolence is the most effective way of achieving change because in the process it does not rip countries apart; it builds, it does not destroy."

== Death ==
Smiley died on September 14, 1993, in Glendale, California, at the age of 83. In a statement issued by Dean Hunsell, a board member of Los Angeles chapter of the Martin Luther King Center for Nonviolence, it was announced that Smiley died of natural causes likely connected to complications from a previous stroke. Smiley left behind his wife, Helen, as well as three children, eight grandchildren, and 22 great-grandchildren.
