= Real Deal (comics) =

Real Deal Magazine
- Real Deal #1; Cover art by Lawrence Hubbard.

Publication information
- Publisher: Real Deal Productions
- Schedule: Irregular
- Format: Ongoing while in publication
- Publication date: 1989 - 2001
- No. of issues: 8
- Main character(s): G.C. Ace Brogham; Slick Willy; Pork-Butt; The R-Team; Prisoner #73588X; Hooded Mack

Creative team
- Created by: H.P. McElwee and Lawrence Hubbard
- Written by: H.P. McElwee (aka "R.D. Bone") "Dr. Chronic"
- Artist(s): Lawrence Hubbard (aka "Raw Dog"/"Raw Dawg"/"Psycho Raw"); William Clausen; Jeff McNurlin

Real Deal Magazine was an independent comic book title published in the 1990s. One of the rare contemporary African-American-created and published comics, Real Deal depicted the Los Angeles underworld life with deadpan visceral humor and gross-out violence (termed "Urban Terror" by the creators). Stories were by H.P. McElwee (aka "R.D. Bone") and art primarily by Lawrence Hubbard (aka "Raw Dawg").

Inspired by magazines like Mad, traditional superhero comics, and people the creators knew in their own lives, Real Deal satirized Blaxploitation movies with a mélange of stories featuring convicts, hustlers, drug addicts, crack whores, car thieves, and murderers. In the words of artist/publisher Hubbard, a typical Real Deal story began with

... an everyday situation: Going to the store, the car wash, buying some food, you have a confrontation, nobody backs down! And next all hell breaks loose!! And the main thing is none of the characters give a shit about the consequences.

Hubbard cites Mort Drucker, Angelo Torres, George Woodbridge, Jack Kirby, Steve Ditko, E. Simms Campbell, and Doug Wildey as influences, while critics note the similarity of Hubbard's inking to that of Gary Panter and Raymond Pettibon.

== Publication history ==
Real Deal creators Hubbard and McElwee worked together at the Los Angeles headquarters of California Federal Savings in the 1980s. Amused by McElwee's wild stories of his friends and associates, Hubbard proposed illustrating them in comic form. After being rejected by mainstream publishers like DC and Marvel Comics, in 1989 Hubbard and McElwee formed Real Deal Productions and self-published Real Deal #1.

Real Deal ran six issues, published irregularly from 1989 until 2001 (issues #1–#5 were published from 1989–1996; the final issue was published in 2001). Real Deal #1 was tabloid-sized, printed in colour on newsprint; issues #2-6 were traditional comic book size and format. Circa 1998, writer McElwee died at age 43 of a heart attack; issue #6 was published after his death featuring stories he had already written.

Throughout the 1990s, Hubbard and McElwee made regular appearances at San Diego Comic-Con promoting Real Deal, where the comic became a cult favourite, especially among alternative comics creators.

By 2001, faced with distribution problems and low sales, Real Deal went on hiatus.

In 2009, alternative comics publisher PictureBox began distributing original issues of Real Deal through their website and at conventions like the MoCCA Art Festival. As of June 2010, new issues of Real Deal are in production, with art and stories by Hubbard. A PictureBox trade paperback collection of the first six issues was also planned.

In 2016, Fantagraphics published the Real Deal Graphic Novel.

In 2025, a special issue named Real Deal Ashy Can Issue was dropped during San Diego Comic-Con.

== Plot and characters ==
Every issue of Real Deal featured G.C., a middle-aged streetwise criminal with no conscience, and his gang, including such characters as Ace Brogham, Slick Willy, and Pork-Butt. A recurring feature was the "Gore Dance," a wild scene of violence and mayhem.

Many issues featured the R-Team (a take-off on The A-Team), a rag-tag group of paramilitary criminals led by Sarge. Other members of the R-Team include "Ugh", Killing Machine, "Match-Head", and Mad-Dog Jack. Among other "missions," the R-Team takes on the Italian Mafia.

The recurring science fiction feature "Planet Dregs" stars Prisoner #73588X.
