= Rikki-Tikki-Tavi (disambiguation) =

Rikki-Tikki-Tavi may refer to:

- Rikki-Tikki-Tavi, an 1894 short story by Rudyard Kipling
- Rikki-Tikki-Tavi, a 1965 Soviet cartoon
- "Rikki Tikki Tavi", a song by Donovan on his 1970 album Open Road
- Rikki-Tikki-Tavi (film), a 1975 Soviet-Indian film
- Rikki-Tikki-Tavi (picture book), a 1997 retelling of Kipling's story
- Rikki Tikki Tavi, the name of a notable B17 Flying Fortress
