= God Bless the Child =

God Bless the Child may refer to:

== Literature ==
- God Bless the Child, 1964 novel by Kristin Hunter
- God Bless the Child (picture book), a 2003 picture book by Jerry Pinkney of the Billie Holiday and Arthur Herzog Jr. song

== Music ==
- "God Bless the Child" (Billie Holiday song), covered by many artists
- "God Bless the Child" (Shania Twain song)
- God Bless the Child (Guerilla Black album), 2007
- God Bless the Child (Kenny Burrell album), 1971

== Television ==
- "God Bless the Child" (Law & Order), an episode of Law & Order
- "God Bless the Child", an episode of Dirt
- God Bless the Child (film), a 1988 TV movie starring Mare Winningham
