= The Lion & the Mouse =

2009 picture book by Jerry Pinkney

- Front cover
- Author: Jerry Pinkney
- Illustrator: Jerry Pinkney
- Cover artist: Jerry Pinkney
- Genre: Children's book
- Publisher: Little, Brown Books for Young Readers
- Publication date: September 1, 2009
- Publication place: United States
- Media type: Hardcover
- Pages: 40
- ISBN: 0-316-01356-0
- OCLC: 263604760
- LC Class: PZ8.2.P456 Li 2009

The Lion & the Mouse is a 2009 nearly wordless picture book illustrated by Jerry Pinkney. This book, published by Little, Brown and Company, tells Aesop's fable of The Lion and the Mouse. In the story, a mouse's life is a spared by a lion. Later, after the lion is trapped, the mouse is able to set the lion free. Adapting the fable, with the moral that the weak can help the strong, as a wordless picture book was seen as a successful way of overcoming the brief plot generally found in the source stories. While it was Pinkney's first wordless picture book, it was not the first time he had told the story, having previously included it in his Aesop's Fables, published in 2000. Pinkney, who had received five Caldecott Honors, became the first African American to win the Caldecott Medal for his illustrations in this book. His illustrations were generally praised for their realism and sense of place. The cover illustrations, featuring the title characters but no text, drew particular praise.

== Background and publication ==
This book is the second time Pinkney has told this story, the first being as part of his 2000 compendium of Aesop's Fables. When creating this book it was important for Pinkney to balance retelling a classic story and expressing the African-American experience. He also wanted to show that a fable could be "action packed" and not just moralistic. The story is Pinckney's favorite fable and he felt that the characters of the mouse and the "majestic lion" were particularly relatable for children. For Pinkney a wordless version seemed like a natural evolution of the "sparse" versions of the story he had seen elsewhere. It was Pinkney's first wordless picture book, although he began creating it intending to include words and it was only after completing the illustrations that he realized it could be wordless. When he showed it to his editor he gave her a version that included onomatopoetic animals sounds and one without; they both agreed that the other animals sounds improved the story, with Pinkney commenting that, "[t]hese sounds surround me with a continuity and motion and energy ... It's nature speaking". Pinkney hoped that the story would inspire its readers to think of its African setting, the Serengeti, as a place that people need to pay attention to and save.

This book was published on September 1, 2009 by Little, Brown Books for Young Readers. An audio book and video featuring atmospheric sounds and music by Sazi Dlamini was released in 2010 by Weston Woods Studios; it is designed to be listened to together with this book.

== Plot ==
In this book where the only words are the sounds made by the animals, the story begins at dawn. The mouse escapes several predators before coming upon the lion. The lion lets the mouse go. Later, some hunters come along and capture the lion with the net. The mouse chews through the rope of the net, freeing the lion and they become friends.

== Illustrations and design ==
Pinkney illustrated this book using "pencil, watercolor, and colored pencils on paper." This method helps, in the words of The Horn Book Magazine review, to provide, "pleasing detail".

This book is unusual in that it does not have any text on its front dust cover, just the picture of the lion, though this is something that this book's publisher had done before. This back cover features the mouse, such that when the book is opened the mouse and the lion look at each other. The events of the story further the personality traits shown during the course of the story; the lion is powerful while the mouse is curious and alert. These personalities are shown through the other animals' body parts that are illustrated in close-up.

This book's illustrations of the Serengeti were seen as well-researched and carefully drawn. Part of this is that the illustrations of the animals are drawn in correct proportion to each other. While the perspective is drawn at human eye-level, the reader is encouraged to think of other perspectives, such as to look down to notice details like the mouse. Further, the animals are able to convey emotions without becoming personified. Pinkney's use of panels in select moments drew comparisons to that of a silent movie and helped to convey the pace and intensity of the action. Other elements of the design, such as Pinkney's use of white space, also enhance the mood and quality of this book.

== Story and themes ==
By making a nearly wordless picture book, Pinkney is able to overcome the challenge faced when adapting Aesop's fables, of using a short story and writing a full length book out of it. Several critics commented on how this format requires great imagination and investment from the reader in order to follow the story. Wendy Lukeheart writing in School Library Journal suggested that, "the lack of words in this version allows for a slower, subtle, and ultimately more satisfying read".

This book's theme of how the "powerful can crush the weak" was seen as particularly timely. Unlike in many retellings of the story, in this wordless book the mouse is unable to vocally bargain with the lion. Yet the story is still able to capture the original story's message "that definitions of meek and might are simply a matter of perspective". Through their respective strengths and weaknesses the lion and the mouse are able to find a need to collaborate and even be friends. Pinkney was also interested in exploring the setting of the story and the characters' families. The "temptation, danger, and choice" the characters have to face could suggest a Garden of Eden-like setting, according to Horn Book.

== Reception and awards ==
This book was a best seller and was well reviewed. It received a starred review from Booklist: reviewer Daniel Kraus rhetorically asked how readers could avoid being, "drawn into watercolors of such detail and splendor". The Horn Book Magazine, Kirkus Reviews, Publishers Weekly, and School Library Journal all gave the book starred reviews and included it in their best books of the year lists. The New York Times and Children's Book Council were among those who named it as one of the best books of 2009. Megan Cox Gurdon of The Wall Street Journal called it, "a beautiful recapitulation of an Aesop fable". Amanda Craig in The Times described the book as "exquisite".

This book won the 2010 Caldecott Medal, something which had been widely predicted. The committee cited how, "[i]n glowing colors, Pinkney's textured watercolor illustrations masterfully portray the relationship between two very unlikely friends." Pinkney expressed his surprise at actually winning the Caldecott, after having drawn five honor books. In his acceptance speech, Pinkney discussed what might have sparked his interest in the story, spoke at length about its creation, and his "deep feeling of satisfaction" over children "claiming ownership" of the fable. Pinkney was the first African-American artist to win the award. This book was also a 2010 Boston Globe–Horn Book Award honor book.

== See also ==
- Four harmonious animals

Awards
Preceded by The House in the Night	Caldecott Medal recipient 2010	Succeeded by A Sick Day for Amos McGee
