= Marilyn Singer =

American poet (born 1948)

Marilyn Singer (born 3 October 1948) is an author of children's books in a wide variety of genres, including fiction and non-fiction picture books, juvenile novels and mysteries, young adult fantasies, and poetry. Some of her poems are written as reverso poems.

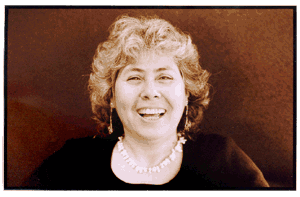
Marilyn Singer Photo by Sonya Sones

== Biography ==
Singer was born in the Bronx, New York City on October 3, 1948, and lived most of her early life in North Massapequa (Long Island), NY. She attended Queens College, City University of New York, and for her junior year, the University of Reading, England. She holds a B.A. in English from Queens College and an M.A. in communications from New York University.

In 1974, after teaching English in New York City high schools for several years, Singer began to write – initially film notes, catalogues, teacher's guides and film strips. Then, one day, when she was sitting in the Brooklyn Botanic Garden, Singer penned a story featuring talking insect characters she'd made up when she was eight. Encouraged by the responses she got, Singer wrote more stories and in 1976 her first book, The Dog Who Insisted He Wasn't, was published by E. P. Dutton.

Since then, Singer has published over one hundred books for children and young adults. Her genres are many and varied, including realistic novels, fantasies, non-fiction, fairy tales, picture books, mysteries and poetry.

In 2023 Singer appeared as a contestant on Jeopardy!.

Singer lives in Park Slope, Brooklyn, New York.

== Education ==
1971. Education: Attended University of Reading, UK, 1967–68; Queens College of the City University of New York, B.A. (cum laude), 1969; New York University, M.A., 1979.

== Works ==
=== Poetry ===
- Strange Place to Call Home (Chronicle, 2012)
- The Superheroes Employment Agency (Clarion, 2012)
- The boy who cried alien! (Disney-Hyperion, 2012)
- A Stick is an Excellent Thing] (Clarion, 2012)
- Every Day’s a Dog’s Day (Dial, 2012)
- A Full Moon is Rising (Lee & Low, 2011)
- Twosomes: Love Poems from the Animal Kingdom (Knopf, 2011)
- '"Tricera-flops" in Dizzy Dinosaurs, edited by Lee Bennett Hopkins (HarperCollins, 2011)
- Mirror, Mirror: A Book of Reversible Verse (Dutton Children's Books, 2010)
- "In My Hand" and "Spinners," in Falling Down the Page edited by Georgia Heard (Roaring Brook Press, 2009)
- "In Here, Kitty, Kitty" in Incredible Inventions edited by Lee Bennett Hopkins (Greenwillow, 2009)
- First Food Fight This Fall and Other School Poems (Sterling, 2008)
- Shoe Bop (Dutton Children's Books, 2008)
- "Making Soup," "Best Friend," and "Singing Down the Sun" in Lessons for Climb Inside a Poem edited by Georgia Heard and Lester Laminack (First Hand Heinemann, 2008)
- "Beach Time" and "Stargazing" in Here's a Little Poem edited by Jane Yolen and Andrew Fusek Peters (Walker, 2007)
- "Diamond Dark" in Faith and Doubt edited by Patrice Vecchione (Holt, 2007)
- "Clay" in Behind the Museum Door edited by Lee Bennett Hopkins (Abrams, 2007)
- "For Me" in Poetry Aloud Here! edited by Sylvia Vardell (ALA Editions, 2006)
- Monday on the Mississippi (Holt, 2005)
- Central Heating: Poems about Fire and Warmth (Knopf, 2005)
- "Haircut" in Oh, No! Where Are My Pants? edited by Lee Bennett Hopkins (HarperCollins, 2005)
- "Heart Art" in Valentine H arts edited by Lee Bennett Hopkins (HarperCollins, 2005)
- Creature Carnival (Hyperion 2004)
- How to Cross a Pond: Poems About Water (Knopf, 2003)
- Fireflies at Midnight (Atheneum, 2003)
- The Company of Crows (Clarion, 2002)
- Footprints on the Roof: Poems About the Earth (Knopf, 2002)
- Monster Museum (Hyperion, 2001)
- On the Same Day in March
- All We Needed to Say: Poems About School (Atheneum, 1996)
- "Kumquats" in Food Fight edited by Michael Rosen (Harcourt, 1996)
- The Morgans Dream (Holt, 1995)
- Please Don't Squeeze Your Boa, Noah! (Holt, 1995)
- Family Reunion (Macmillan, 1994)
- Sky Words (Simon & Schuster, 1994)
- It's Hard to Read a Map with a Beagle on Your Lap (Holt, 1993)
- In My Tent (Macmillan, 1992)
- Nine O'Clock Lullaby (HarperCollins, 1991)
- Turtle in July (Simon & Schuster, 1989) Illustrated by Jerry Pinkney. A Scholastic Book Club selection (paperback), 1991; An NCTE Notable Book, 1989; Best Illustrated Children's Books of 1989, The New York Times; Best Children's Books of 1989, Time magazine; A Reading Rainbow review book, 1994

=== Picture books ===
- Tallulah's Tutu (Published by Clarion, 2011)
- Tallulah's Solo (Published by Clarion, 2012)
- Tallulah's Toe Shoes (Published by Clarion, 2013)
- Tallulah's Nutcracker (Published by Clarion, 2013)
- Tallulah's Tap Shoes (Published by Clarion, 2015)
- Tallulah’s Ice Skates (Published by: Clarion, 2018)
- Have You Heard about Lady Bird? Poems about Our First Ladies. Illustrated by Nancy Carpenter. Disney-Hyperion, 2018.
- What is Your Dog Doing? (Atheneum/Simon & Schuster, 2011)
- I'm Getting a Checkup (Clarion, 2009)
- I'm Your Bus (Scholastic, 2009)
- City Lullaby (Clarion, 2007) Top 10 Children's Books of 2007, Time magazine
- Let's Build a Clubhouse (Clarion, 2006) Selected as one of the Bank Street College Best Children's Books, 2007
- Block Party Today! (Knopf, 2004)
- Boo Hoo Boo-Boo (HarperCollins, 2002)
- Quiet Night (Clarion, 2002)
- Didi and Daddy on the Promenade (Clarion, 2001) Illustrated by Marie-Louise Gay. Canadian Children's Book Centre "Our Choice" Book, 2002; A Children's Literature Choice Book, 2002
- Fred's Bed (HarperCollins, 2001)
- The One and Only Me (HarperCollins, 2000)
- Solomon Sneezes (HarperCollins, 1999)
- Good Day, Good Night (Marshall Cavendish, 1998)
- Chester, the Out-of-Work Dog (Holt, 1992)
- Minnie's Yom Kippur Birthday (Harper & Row, 1989)
- Archer Armadillo's Secret Room (Macmillan, 1985)
- Will You Take Me to Town on Strawberry Day? (Harper & Row, 1981)
- The Pickle Plan (E. P. Dutton, 1978)
- The Dog Who Insisted He Wasn't (E. P. Dutton, 1976) Children's Choice Award (IRA/CBC)

=== Non-fiction ===
- Caterpillars (EarlyLight, 2011)
- Eggs (Holiday House, 2008)
- Venom (Darby Creek, 2007)
- Cats to the Rescue (Holt, 2006)
- What Stinks? (Darby Creek, 2006) An NSTA-CBC Outstanding Science Trade Book, 2007
- Tough Beginnings: How Baby Animals Survive (Holt, 2001)National Science Teachers Association/Children's Book Council Outstanding Science Trade Book for Students, 2002; Skipping Stones Honor Award Book for 2002; Society of School Librarians International Best Book for Science for 2001
- A Pair of Wings (Holiday House, 2001)
- A Dog's Gotta Do What a Dog's Gotta Do: Dogs At Work (Holt, 2000)
- Prairie Dogs Kiss and Lobsters Wave: How Animals Say Hello (Holt, 1998)
- Bottoms Up! A Book About Rear Ends (Holt, 1997) Society of School Librarians International Best Books, 1998–9
- A Wasp is Not a Bee (Holt, 1995)
- Exotic Birds (Doubleday, 1991)
- The Fanatic's Ecstatic, Aromatic Guide to Onions, Garlic, Shallots and Leeks (Prentice Hall, 1981)

=== Novels for children ===
- The Circus Lunicus (Holt, 2000)
- Josie to the Rescue (Scholastic, 1999)
- Big Wheel (Hyperion, 1993)
- California Demon (Hyperion, 1992)
- Charmed (Atheneum, 1990)
- Twenty Ways to Lose Your Best Friend (HarperCollins, 1990)
- Mitzi Meyer, Fearless Warrior Queen (Scholastic, 1987)
- Ghost Host (HarperCollins, 1987)
- Lizzie Silver of Sherwood Forest (HarperCollins, 1986)
- Tarantulas on the Brain (HarperCollins, 1982)
- It Can't Hurt Forever (HarperCollins, 1978)

=== Mysteries for children ===
- Sam and Dave Mysteries:
  - The Hoax on You (HarperCollins, 1989)
  - The Case of the Fixed Election (HarperCollins, 1989)
  - The Case of the Cackling Car (HarperCollins, 1985)
  - A Clue in Code (HarperCollins, 1985)
  - The Case of the Sabotaged School Play (HarperCollins, 1984)
  - Leroy is Missing (HarperCollins, 1984)
- Samantha Spayed Mysteries:
  - Where There's a Will, There's a Wag (Holt, 1986)
  - A Nose for Trouble (Holt, 1985)
  - The Fido Frame-up (Warne, 1983)

=== Fiction for young adults ===
- Make Me Over: Eleven Original Stories About Transforming Ourselves (E. P. Dutton, 2005) Eleven stories about makeovers, physical, psychological, spiritual, etc. edited by Marilyn and including her story "Bedhead Red, Peekaboo Pink," as well as stories by Joyce Sweeney, Rene Saldana Jr., Peni Griffin, Joseph Bruchac, Terry Trueman, Jess Mowry, Norma Howe, Marina Budhos, Evelyn Coleman, and Margaret Peterson Haddix. New York Public Library's Best Books for the Teen Age, 2006
- "Word of the Day" in Twice Told: Original Stories Inspired by Original Artwork (Dutton, 2006)
- Face Relations: Eleven Stories About Seeing Beyond Color (Simon & Schuster, 2004) A young adult anthology of short stories about race relations, edited by Marilyn and including her story "Negress," as well as stories by Jess Mowry, Joseph Bruchac, Sherri Winston, Rene Saldana Jr., Naomi Shihab Nye, Ellen Wittlinger, Kyoko Mori, M.E. Kerr, Marina Budhos, and Rita Williams-Garcia. Nominated for an ALA Best Books for Young Adults, 2004; New York Public Library's Best Books for the Teen Age, 2005
- "First Position" in Sports Shorts edited by Tanya Dean, illustrated by Scott Hunt (Darby Creek, 2005)
- "Shattered" in Shattered: Stories of Children and War edited by Jennifer Armstrong (Random House, 2002)
- I Believe in Water: Twelve Brushes With Religion (HarperCollins, 2000) An anthology of short stories for teens about religion, edited by Marilyn and including her contribution "Fabulous Shoes," as well as stories by Nancy Springer, Gregory Maguire, Virginia Euwer Wolff, Jacqueline Woodson, Margaret Peterson Haddix, Kyoko Mori, Jennifer Armstrong, Joyce Carol Thomas, M. E. Kerr, Jess Mowry, and Naomi Shihab Nye. New York Public Library's Best Books for the Teen Age, 2001; Runner-up, Publishers Weekly Best Religious Books of 2000; Cooperative Children's Book Center CCBC Link, Book of the Week, Dec 11, 2000; Tayshas List, 2001-2
- Stay True: Short Stories for Strong Girls (Scholastic, 1998)
- Deal with a Ghost (Holt, 1997; Avon Tempest, 1999) Society of School Librarians International Best Books, 1997–8; Tayshas List, 1998–9; Nominee for an Edgar Award
- Storm Rising (Scholastic, 1989)
- Several Kinds of Silence (HarperCollins, 1988)
- Horsemaster (Atheneum Books, 1985)
- The Course of True Love Never Did Run Smooth (HarperCollins, 1983); An American Library Association Best Book, 1983
- The First Few Friends (HarperCollins, 1981)
- No Applause, Please (E. P. Dutton, 1977)

=== Fairy tales ===
- The Maiden on the Moor (Morrow, 1995)
- In the Palace of the Ocean King (Atheneum, 1995)
- The Painted Fan (Morrow, 1994)
- The Golden Heart of Winter (Morrow, 1991)

=== Magazine articles and other publications ===
- "Pests and Pollinators," on insects and other garden animals in Click magazine (Carus Publishing Company; July/August 2002)
- "Clay Castles," on African termites in Click (February 2002)
- "A Safe Place," on Kruger National Park in Click (March 2001)
- "Never-Ending Journey," on the Serengeti migrations in Click (October 2000)
- "Raising the Bar," on Puppies Behind Bars, a program that prison inmates raise pups to become guide dogs for the blind in AKC Gazette (October 2000)
- "A Dad Who Has Babies," on seahorses in Click (February 2000)
- "A Farmer's Best Friend," on sheepdogs in Click (May/June 1999)
- "Paper Houses," on wasp nests in Click (February 1999)
- "The Mind of the Judge," on dog obedience trial judges in AKC Gazette (March 1998)

=== Forthcoming ===
- Cat-Chasing Day (Dutton) A poetry collection on holidays for dogs
- The Boy Who Cried Alien (Hyperion) A "silent movie" in poems about Larry the Liar, a spaceship, and a town
- Follow Follow: A Book of Reverso Poems (Dial)
- Rutherford B., Who Was He? (Disney-Hyperion)
- I'm Gonna Climb a Mountain in My Patent Leather Shoes (Abrams)

== Awards and nominations ==
- Mirror, Mirror
  - Cybil Award for Poetry, 2011
  - ALA Notable, 2011
  - CLA/NCTE Notable, 2011
  - Nominee, Texas Bluebonnet Award
  - Capitol Choice Book
  - 6 starred reviews
- Chicago Public Library's Best of the Best, 2009 (Eggs and First Food Fight This Fall)
- Orbis Pictus Honor Book, 2008 (Venom)
- New York Public Library's One Hundred Best Titles for Reading and Sharing, 2007 (Venom)
- Time Magazine's Top 10 Children's Books, 2007 (City Lullaby)
- NSTA-CBC Outstanding Science Trade Book, 2007 (What Stinks?)
- Science Books & Film Best Trade Books, 2006 (What Stinks?)
- New York Public Library, Best Books for the Teen Age, 2006
- ALSC Notable Book, 2005 (Central Heating)
- Lee Bennett Hopkins Poetry Award Honor Book, 2005 (Creature Carnival)
- New York Public Library's "Best Books for the Teen Age," 2005
- Nominee:ALA Best Book for Young Adults, 2004
- NSTA-CBA Outstanding Science Trade Book, 2002 (Tough Beginnings: How Baby Animals Survive)
- Canadian Children's Book Centre "Our Choice" Book, 2002
- Children's Literature Choice Book, 2002
- National Science Teachers Association/Children's Book Council Outstanding Science Trade Book for Students, 2002
- Skipping Stones Honor Award Book for 2002
- Society of School Librarians International Best Book for Science, 2001 (Tough Beginnings: How Baby Animals Survive)
- Animal Behavior Society Children's Book Award, 2001 (A Pair of Wings)
- Society of School Librarians International Best Book for Science for 2001
- New York Public Library's "Best Books for the Teen Age," 2001 (I Believe in Water: Twelve Brushes with Religion)
- Tayshas List, 2001–2002
- Popular Paperbacks for Young Adults, 2000 (YALSA) (Stay True: Short Stories for Strong Girls)
- Booklist's Top Ten Science Books, 2000 (On the Same Day in March)
- NCSS-CBC Notable Book, 2000 (On the Same Day in March)
- Runner-up, Publishers Weekly Best Religious Books of 2000
- Cooperative Children's Book Center CCBC Link, Book of the Week, Dec 11, 2000
- Finalist, YA category, Edgar Award, 1998 (Deal with a Ghost)
- Nominee: Edgar Award, 1998
- Society of School Librarians International Best Books, 1997–1998
- Scholastic Book Club selection (paperback), 1993
- Scholastic Book Club selection (paperback), 1991
- NCTE Notable Book, 1989
- Best Illustrated Children's Books of 1989, The New York Times
- Best Children's Books of 1989, Time magazine
- Society of School Librarians International Best Books, 1998–1999
- ALA Best Book for Young Adults, 1983 (The Course of True Love Never Did Run Smooth)
- An American Library Association Best Book, 1983
- Maud Hart Lovelace Award, 1983 (It Can't Hurt Forever)
- Children's Choice Award (IRA/CBC)
- Turtle in July
  - NCTE Notable, 1989
  - New York Times Best Illustrated, 1989
  - Time magazine Best Children's Books of 1989
  - Reading Rainbow review book

== Quotes, interviews, reviews and media ==
- Celebrating Poetry: Marilyn Singer,
- The New York State Reading Association Youth Book Blog (interview)
- Reading Rockets: A video interview with Marilyn Singer (video interview)
- The Miss Rumphius Effect (interview)
- David Harrison's Blog (interview)
- Cynthia Leitich Smith's Cynsations (interview)
- TeensReadToo.com (interview)
- Who Wrote That? by Patricia M. Newman (interview)
- "Sidelights Sketch" from Something About the Author, Vols. 80 & 125 (article about Marilyn Singer)
- WritingWorld.com (interview)
- "I don't know if I have a single poem that defines me. A lot of people think of me as a "nature poet" because I love writing about the natural world. But I also like to create characters and use them as narrators, and I'm fond of really silly verse."
- Singer actually sits and writes with pen in hand for three to four hours a day. "But I think writing for twenty-four, it seems. I like to write in cafes, restaurants, subways—it's not fixed."
- PEN American Center participating author
- Teaching Pre-K-8
- Commitment
- New York Times review of "City Lullaby" November 2007
- Parents Choice review of City Lullaby
