= The Little Red Hen =

American fable, first published in 1874

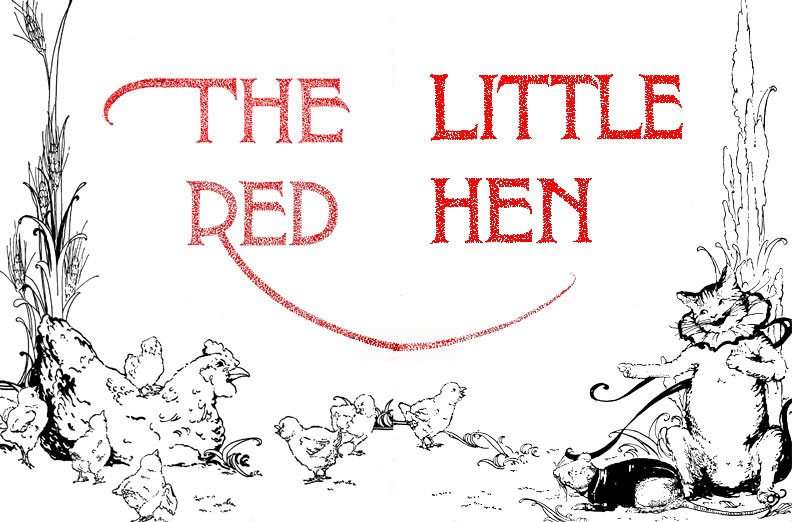
The Little Red Hen, 1918 title page

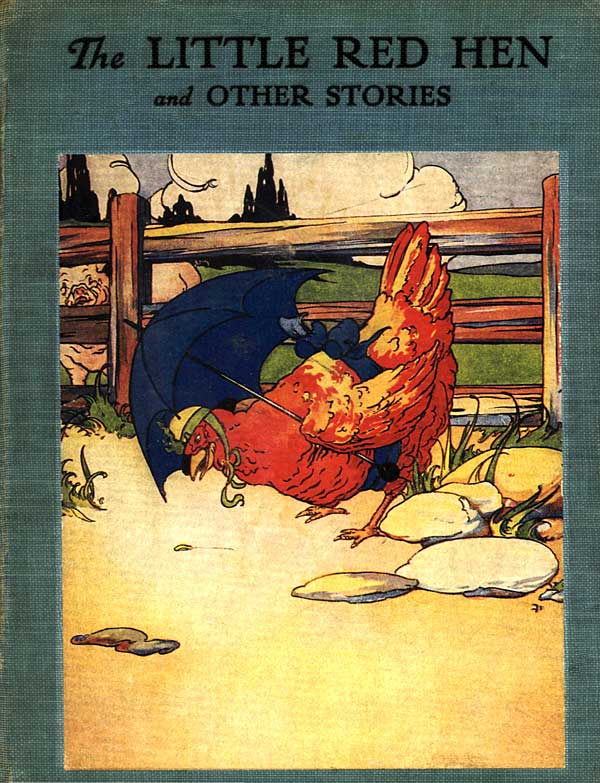
The Little Red Hen, illustrated by Florence White Williams

The Little Red Hen is an American fable first collected by Mary Mapes Dodge in St. Nicholas magazine in 1874. The story is meant to teach children the importance of hard work and personal initiative.

== Plot ==
A hen living on a farm finds some wheat and decides to make bread with it. She asks the other farmyard animals to help her plant it, but they refuse. The hen then harvests and mills the wheat into flour before baking it into bread; at each stage she again asks the animals for help, but they still refuse. Finally, with her task complete, the hen asks who will help her eat the bread. This time the animals eagerly accept, but the hen refuses, stating that no one helped her with her work and decides to eat the bread herself.

In some books, the Little Red Hen (though she did eat the bread all by herself) decides to give her friends another chance. The Little Red Hen says that next time she will be happy to make enough bread for herself, her chicks, and all her farmyard animal friends if they help her. Her friends ask, "If we help you?". The little red hen says, "Yes. If you help me do the work". The friends happily promise to help her next time. From then on, her farmyard animal friends become eager helpers.

In some variations, the hen has chicks who help her out with the entire process, and the hen and her brood then proceed to eat the bread as a family. They cut some sandwiches to have during the day, then have a bit of toast the following morning before feeding the stale leftovers to the ducks.

== Background and adaptations ==
The tale is based on a story Dodge's mother often told her. Originally the other animals besides the hen consist of a rat, a cat, a dog, a duck, and a pig. Later adaptations often reduce the number of other animals to three.

The story was likely intended as a literature primer for young readers, but departed from highly moralistic, often religious stories written for the same purpose. Adaptations throughout the 1880s incorporated appealing illustrations in order to hold the reader's attention as interest became more relevant to reading lessons. Repetitive vocabulary is still used in adaptations in order to encourage learning for very early readers. A 2006 picture book adaptation by Jerry Pinkney was well-received for similar reasons.

An animated adaptation of the story titled The Wise Little Hen was produced by Walt Disney Productions in 1934. It is notable for the first appearance of Donald Duck as one of the lazy animals who refuses to help the hen. The same year another animated version was released by Iwerks Studio in the ComiColor Cartoons-series.

=== Revisions ===
Politically themed revisions of the story include a conservative version based on a 1976 monologue from Ronald Reagan. This version features a farmer who claims that the hen is being unfair by refusing to share the bread and forcing her to do so, removing the hen's incentive to work and causing poverty to befall the farm. Another version satirizes capitalism by depicting the hen promising the animals slices of bread if they make it, but keeping the largest slice for herself despite not doing any work. A version by Malvina Reynolds adapts the story into a pro-work socialist anthem as the hen retains the fruits of her labor, saying "And that's why they called her Red". In some versions it is her children who help her and after she refuses to share with the other animals they promise to help from now on.

An episode of the animated series Super Why! features a revision of the story. In the episode, the Super Readers change the ending so that the hen tells the animals why she needs their help and they listen, enabling them to help her finish the cornbread so that she shares it with them. In Elena Doria Winell's operatic adaptation, on the other hand, the psychological weight of unrecognized labor takes a toll on the Hen and she, in a final mad scene, murders the other farm animals, chokes on the bread, and dies.

== See also ==
- The Ant and the Grasshopper, an Aesop fable with a similar moral
- The Gigantic Turnip
