= Arnold Adoff =

American children's writer

Arnold Adoff (July 16, 1935, in Bronx, New York – May 7, 2021, in Yellow Springs, Ohio) was an American children's writer. In 1988, the National Council of Teachers of English gave Adoff the Award for Excellence in Poetry for Children. He has said, "I will always try to turn sights and sounds into words. I will always try to shape words into my singing poems."

== Biography ==
Adoff grew up in the South Bronx, New York, the son of Jewish immigrants from a town near the Polish-Russian border. He enrolled in the Columbia University School of Pharmacy but transferred to City College of New York, where he received a B.A. in history and literature. He married Virginia Hamilton in 1960 and they lived in Europe briefly before moving back to New York City. Adoff taught social studies in Harlem and the Upper West Side of New York. Adoff and Hamilton eventually moved to Yellow Springs, Ohio, where Adoff lived until his death in 2021.

"I began writing for kids because I wanted to effect a change in American society. I continue in that spirit. By the time we reach adulthood, we are closed and set in our attitudes. The chances of a poet reaching us are very slim. But I can open a child's imagination, develop his appetite for poetry, and more importantly, show him that poetry is a natural part of everyday life. We all need someone to point out that the emperor is wearing no clothes. That's the poet's job." --Arnold Adoff

== Fiction ==
- Mandala - Pictures by Emily McCully, Harper and Row, 1971.
- Black is Brown Is Tan - pictures by Emily Arnold McCully, Harper Collins, 2002, Harper & Row, 1973.
- Hard to be Six - illustrated by Cheryl Hanna, Lee & Shapard, 1991.
- In for Winter, Out for Spring - illustrated by Jerry Pinkney, Harcourt Brace Jovanovich, 1991.
- The Return of Rex and Ethel - illustrated by Catherine Deeter, Harcourt, 2000.
- Daring Dog and Captain Cat - illustrated by Joe Cepeda, Simon & Schuster for Young Readers, 2001.

== Nonfiction ==
- Black on Black; Commentaries by Negro Americans. New York: Macmillan, 1968.
- Brothers and Sisters; Modern Stories by Black Americans. New York: Macmillan, 1970.
- Malcolm X. - illustrated by Rudy Gutierrez. pa. HarperCollins, 2000 (ages 7–10). Winner of ALA Notable Children’s Book and Library of Congress Children’s Books.
- Roots and Blues: A Celebration - illustrated by R. Gregory Christie. New York: Houghton Mifflin. 2011. Winner of The Lion and the Unicorn Award for Excellence in North American Poetry, 2012.
