= The Grasshopper & the Ants =

2015 book by Jerry Pinkney

- First edition
- Author: Jerry Pinkney
- Illustrator: Jerry Pinkney
- Language: English
- Genre: Children's literature, picture book, American poetry
- Published: 2015 (Little, Brown and Company)
- Publication place: United States
- Media type: Print (hardback)
- ISBN: 9780316400817
- OCLC: 862928754

The Grasshopper & the Ants, by Jerry Pinkney, is a 2015 adaptation of the classic Aesop fable where a grasshopper relaxes through Spring, Summer, and Autumn, while a colony of ants work at gathering food for the Winter, but although initially refusing the grasshopper's request for help, they relent and invite him in to share.

== Reception ==
Booklist, in a review of The Grasshopper & the Ants, wrote "Another winner to follow his other renditions of Aesop's fables .. Pinkney's lush style and Aesop's timeless fables are an award-winning combination.". and School Library Journal found it "A lively and engaging version of a favorite Aesop fable."

Common Sense Media wrote "Though the washy watercolor and busy spreads of ants sometimes make it difficult to discern the finer details, a close reading yields benefits" and highlighted the story's message that "Art and entertainment are important, as is the sharing of bounty."

The Grasshopper & the Ants has also been reviewed by The Horn Book Magazine, Publishers Weekly, School Library Connection, and Kirkus Reviews.

== Awards ==
- 2015 Best Illustrated Children's Books
- 2015 Parents' Choice Picture Books Award - Gold Award
- 2016 ALA Notable Children's Book - Younger Readers
- 2016 Bank Street College of Education Best Children's Books of the Year
