= Turtle in July =

1989 picture book by Marilyn Singer

- Front cover, designed by Jerry Pinkney
- Author: Marilyn Singer
- Illustrator: Jerry Pinkney
- Language: English
- Genre: Children's literature, Poetry
- Published: 1989 (Macmillan Publishers)
- Publication place: United States
- Media type: Print (hardback, paperback)
- Pages: 32
- ISBN: 9780027828818
- OCLC: 19123010

Turtle in July is a 1989 children's picture book by Marilyn Singer and it is illustrated by Jerry Pinkney. It comprises a collection of animal poems and what they each experience during various times of the year.

== Reception ==
A review of Turtle in July by Booklist, called it "both fresh and engaging", noted "The animal poems, framed by the seasons of the year, are sharply evocative", and recommended it " for both poetry and nature units."

Turtle in July has also been reviewed by School Library Journal, and Publishers Weekly,

== Awards ==
- 1989 CCBC Choice
- 1989 New York Times 10 Best Illustrated Books of the Year
- 1993 National Council of Teachers of English (NCTE) Adventuring with Books book
