= Mirandy and Brother Wind =

1988 children's picture book by Patricia McKissack

- Author: Patricia McKissack
- Illustrator: Jerry Pinkney
- Language: English
- Genre: Children's picture book,
- Published: 1988 (Alfred A. Knopf)
- Publication place: United States
- Media type: Print (hardback)
- Pages: 32 (unpaginated)
- ISBN: 9780394887654
- OCLC: 15220842

Mirandy and Brother Wind is a 1988 children's picture book by Patricia McKissack and illustrated by Jerry Pinkney. It is about a girl, Mirandy, who attempts to catch the wind so he will be her partner for the upcoming junior cakewalk.

== Reception ==
The School Library Journal in a review of Mirandy and Brother Wind described the illustrations as "Sultry watercolor washes in a realistic flowing style spread luxuriously and consistently over every two pages.." and concluded "A captivating story, with a winning heroine, told in black dialect."

Kirkus Reviews, in a starred review, wrote "As she did in Flossie and the Fox, McKissack has created in Mirandy a character full of vigor, humor, and imagination. Pinkney captures the liveliness of the story in his expansive paintings, dappled with impressionistic hues;" and Publishers Weekly wrote "Told in spirited dialect and rendered in lavish, sweeping watercolors, this provides an intriguing look at a time gone by. As a story, however, it proves somewhat disappointing. After the colorful description of cakewalking in the author's note and the anticipation created through Mirandy's own eagerness, the brief and rather static scenes portraying the dance itself are a letdown."

It has been made into a musical for young audiences. The play, by librettist Michael J. Bobbitt and composer/lyricist John L. Cornelius II, received its debut at Adventure Theatre in metropolitan Washington, D.C., in January 2011.

== Awards ==
- 1989 Caldecott Medal - honor
- 1989 Coretta Scott King Book Illustration Award - winner
