= Little Red Riding Hood (Pinkney book) =

- Author: Brothers Grimm
- Illustrator: Jerry Pinkney
- Language: English
- Genre: Children's picture book, fairy tale
- Published: 2007 (Little, Brown)
- Publication place: United States
- Media type: Print (hardback)
- Pages: 34 (unpaginated)
- ISBN: 9780316013550
- OCLC: 71222925

Little Red Riding Hood is a 2007 children's picture book of the Brothers Grimm classic fairy tale adapted by Jerry Pinkney.

== Reception ==
Common Sense Media in its review of Little Red Riding Hood, wrote "His artwork alone brings an amazing depth to this classic tale, which in his telling goes beyond the expected. He brings a multicultural sensitivity to a story that has long been part of a European tradition. And his language is poetic and captivating." and " If you want to own one version of Little Red Riding Hood other than the original, this is definitely the one to have." Kirkus and Publishers Weekly both gave starred reviews and also highlighted the multicultural nature of Pinkney's version.

Little Red Riding Hood has also been reviewed by Booklist, Horn Book Guide, Library Media Connection magazine, School Library Journal, and School Library Media Activities Monthly.

It was a 2008 ALA notable Children's (Young Readers) Book.
