= The Sunday Outing =

1994 picture book by Gloria Jean Pinkney

- First edition
- Author: Gloria Jean Pinkney
- Illustrator: Jerry Pinkney
- Language: English
- Genre: Children's literature, picture book
- Published: 1994 (Dial Press)
- Publication place: United States
- Media type: Print (hardback)
- Pages: 32
- ISBN: 9780803711990
- OCLC: 28707787

The Sunday Outing is a 1994 children's picture book by Gloria Jean Pinkney and illustrated by Jerry Pinkney. Published by Dial Press in 1994, it is a prequel to Back Home, and is about a young girl, Ernestine, who makes sacrifices so she can afford a train trip.

== Reception ==
School Library Journal, in a review of The Sunday Outing, wrote "Gloria Jean Pinkney reaches back into her childhood to create another realistic and moving depiction of African-American life. .. The text reflects the true essence of African-American dialogue and meshes with Jerry Pinkney's illustrations" and Booklist called it "upbeat".

Publishers Weekly wrote "Gloria Pinkney skillfully captures the fidgety impatience of childhood. .. Jerry Pinkney's pale watercolors include several tender, warmly lit portraits. The yellowish-brown backgrounds, unfortunately, add an almost dulling sameness to many scenes."

The Sunday Outing has also been reviewed by Kirkus Reviews, The Horn Book Magazine, and Library Talk, The Washington Post, and The Bulletin of the Center for Children's Books.

== See also ==
- Back Home (Pinkney book)
