= Noah's Ark (Pinkney book) =

Book by Jerry Pinkney

- First edition cover of Noah's Ark
- Author: Jerry Pinkney
- Illustrator: Jerry Pinkney
- Language: English
- Genre: Children's literature, mythology, picture book
- Published: 2002 (SeaStar Books)
- Publication place: United States
- Media type: Print (hardback)
- Pages: 32 (unpaginated)
- ISBN: 9781587172014
- OCLC: 49305434

Noah's Ark is a 2002 book by Jerry Pinkney. It is the biblical story of Noah's Ark, from construction of the vessel and gathering of the animals, to first harvest and the appearance of rainbows.

== Reception ==
The Horn Book Magazine, in a review of Noah's Ark, wrote "Pinkney's vision is of a world rich in beauty and brimming with life, both before and after the flood. .. This Noah's Ark, eloquently imbued with reverence for God and the natural world, belongs in every library." Although Booklist's review expressed concern with some of the book's illustrations, writing "the art is uneven, with a sameness to a few of the spreads, and sometimes the fascinating pencil underpinnings of the pictures are lost beneath the washes." it found "there's much that is exceptional here" and concluded "Definitely make room for this on the shelf."

Noah's Ark has also been reviewed by Publishers Weekly, School Library Journal, Kirkus Reviews, AudioFile, Mississippi Libraries journal, and Catholic Library World magazine.

== Awards ==
- 2002 Sydney Taylor Book Award for Younger Readers - Honor
- 2003 Caldecott Medal - honor
- 2004 ALA Notable Children's Recording
