= The Christmas Boot =

2016 picture book by Lisa Wheeler

- Author: Lisa Wheeler
- Illustrator: Jerry Pinkney
- Language: English
- Genre: Children's literature, Picture book, Fairy tale
- Published: 2016 (Dial Books for Young Readers)
- Publication place: USA
- Media type: Print (hardback, paperback)
- Pages: 32 (unpaginated)
- ISBN: 9780803741348
- OCLC: 964637599

The Christmas Boot is a 2016 picture book by Lisa Wheeler and illustrator Jerry Pinkney. It is about a woman, Hannah Greyweather, who finds a single black boot, that turns out to be owned by Santa.

== Reception ==
School Library Journal, in a review of The Christmas Boot, recognised it as a "retelling of the folktale of the "Fisherman's Wife" who greedily wishes for too much has a kinder ending" but with "a kinder ending" and concluded "A worthy holiday reimagining, best enjoyed as an independent read or as a read-aloud in a small group setting"

The Horn Book Magazine wrote "the storytelling is a little too loose to be completely satisfying, but the air of Christmas mystery and coziness is successfully maintained thanks to Pinkney's snowy pencil and watercolor illustrations of a country Christmas and a heroine who is satisfied with what she has and happy with what she gets: a puppy."

The Christmas Boot has also been reviewed by Publishers Weekly, Booklist, Kirkus Reviews, and The New York Times.
