= The Nightingale (Pinkney book) =

Book by Hans Christian Andersen

- Author: Hans Christian Andersen
- Illustrator: Jerry Pinkney
- Language: English
- Genre: Children's literature, fairy tale, picture book
- Published: 2002 (Phyllis Fogelman Books)
- Publication place: United States
- Media type: Print (hardback)
- Pages: 32 (unpaginated)
- ISBN: 9780803724648
- OCLC: 47930623

The Nightingale is a 2002 adaptation of the classic 1843 Hans Christian Andersen story by Jerry Pinkney. It is about a king who forsakes a nightingale for a bejeweled mechanical bird, becomes gravely ill, and is then revived by the song of the nightingale.

== Reception ==
The Horn Book Magazine, in a review of The Nightingale, wrote "authors or illustrators tinker with it [the original] at their peril. .. Unfortunately, [Pinkney] reinventing both setting and characters causes much of the original Andersen to be lost in the process." and concluded "Pinkney's book should be treated as an elegant creation, but one hopes that children will also know of the original." School Library Journal was less critical writing "Pinkney has once again applied his considerable talents to the retelling of a traditional tale. He offers a unique presentation without compromising or straying from the original story of the nightingale's power. Like her song, the narration is smooth and flowing. .. A delightful melding of narration and illustration, this book will introduce a new generation to one of Andersen's tales." and Booklist found it "a pleasing version of the classic, fresh in its interpretation but true to the spirit of the original."

The Nightingale has also been reviewed by Publishers Weekly, Kirkus Reviews, and Teacher Librarian.

== Awards ==
- 2002 Parents' Choice Award Story Books - Silver Award (honor)
- 2003 Notable Social Studies Trade Books For Young People - Folktales

== See also ==
- The Ugly Duckling (Pinkney book)
- The Little Match Girl (Pinkney book)
