= The Man Who Kept His Heart in a Bucket =

Book by Sonia Levitin

- Front cover
- Author: Sonia Levitin
- Illustrator: Jerry Pinkney
- Language: English
- Genre: Children's picture book
- Published: 1991 (Dial Press)
- Publication place: United States
- Media type: Print (hardback)
- Pages: 32 (unpaginated)
- ISBN: 978-0-8037103-0-6
- OCLC: 22624171

The Man Who Kept His Heart in a Bucket is a 1991 children's picture book by Sonia Levitin and illustrator Jerry Pinkney. Released in 1991 by Dial Press, it is about a young man, Jack, who due to bitter experience keeps his heart in a bucket but then loses it.

== Reception ==
Booklist, in a review of The Man Who Kept His Heart in a Bucket, wrote "The bold watercolors that sweep across the pages of this picture book demand a strong story line. Levitin delivers a respectable one," and the School Library Journal wrote "Levitin's cleverly created story, structured like a traditional folktale, is enhanced by Pinkney's watercolor and pencil scenes of ruddy-cheeked Eastern European peasants, thatched roof cottages, and lush green countryside." Publishers Weekly called it a "thoroughly captivating story firmly rooted in the folktale tradition."

The Man Who Kept His Heart in a Bucket has also been reviewed by The Horn Book Magazine.
