= Sam and the Tigers =

Book by Julius Lester

Sam and the Tigers: A New Telling of Little Black Sambo
- Author: Julius Lester
- Illustrator: Jerry Pinkney
- Language: English
- Genre: Children's literature, picture book
- Published: 1996 (Dial Press)
- Publication place: United States
- Media type: Print (hardback)
- Pages: 32
- ISBN: 9780803720282
- OCLC: 33441135
- Jane Byers Bierhorst is credited as the book's typographer

Sam and the Tigers: A New Telling of Little Black Sambo is a 1996 Children's picture book by Julius Lester and illustrator Jerry Pinkney. It is a retelling of the classic story by Helen Bannerman and is about a young African American boy, Sam, who outwits a group of hungry tigers.

== Reception ==
Booklist in a review of Sam and the Tigers, wrote "Lester and Pinkney have stripped away the ugly racism and retold the story in a new way. .. Adults will be arguing about this book for months, in print and on the Internet, and Lester's afterword is an excellent place to start the discussion. As for kids, they'll love the book about a child hero who can outwit tigers." School Library Journal wrote "Lester and Pinkney reclaim "Little Black Sambo," the tale of a black child who outwits a pack of bullying tigers, from its negative, racist connotations."

Publishers Weekly gave a starred review and found it "A hip and hilarious retelling that marries the essence of the original with an innovative vision of its own", while the New York Times was critical, writing "Mr. Lester has overloaded the simple structure with much unnecessary baggage." and calling it an "overlong retelling".

Sam and the Tigers has also been reviewed by Kirkus Reviews, The Horn Book Magazine, and the Los Angeles Times

== Awards ==
- 1997 ALA Notable Children's Book - Younger Readers
- 2000 Parents' Choice Award - Recommended (Silver)
- 2016 Phoenix Picture Book Award - Honor
