= The Ugly Duckling (Pinkney book) =

1999 adaption by Jerry Pinkney of a story by Hans Christian Andersen

- First edition cover of The Ugly Duckling
- Author: Hans Christian Andersen
- Illustrator: Jerry Pinkney
- Language: English
- Genre: Children's literature, fairy tale, picture book
- Published: 1999 (Morrow Junior Books)
- Publication place: United States
- Media type: Print (hardback)
- Pages: 32
- ISBN: 9780688159320
- OCLC: 39051276

The Ugly Duckling is a 1999 adaptation of the classic Hans Christian Andersen story by Jerry Pinkney. It is about a cygnet born amongst ducklings that is bullied, runs away, and eventually grows into a beautiful swan.

A film by Weston Woods was released in 2001, narrated by Lynn Whitfield.

== Reception ==
Common Sense Media, in a review of The Ugly Duckling, wrote "Illustrator Jerry Pinkney's descriptive passages resonate with the splendor of nature's beauty." and "The subtle details incorporated into the scenes .. will encourage children to take another look at this old and familiar story." School Library Journal called it "An artistic tour de force that is worthy of its graceful fine-feathered subject." and The Horn Book Magazine found it "a splendid production."

Publishers Weekly gave a starred review describing Pinkneys illustrations as "supple, exquisitely detailed" and the book overall "A flawlessly nuanced performance by a consummate craftsman."

The Ugly Duckling has also been reviewed by Booklist, Library Talk, Kirkus Reviews, and AudioFile.

== Awards ==
- 2000 ALA Notable Children's Book - Older Readers
- 2000 Caldecott Medal - honor

== See also ==
- The Little Match Girl (Pinkney book)
- The Nightingale (Pinkney book)
