= Boom Town (book) =

1998 picture book by Sonia Levitin

- Author: Sonia Levitin
- Illustrator: Cat Bowman Smith
- Genre: Historical fiction
- Publisher: Orchard
- Publication date: 1998
- Pages: 40
- ISBN: 0-531-30043-9
- Preceded by: Nine for California
- Followed by: Taking Charge

Boom Town is a 1998 historical fiction picture book written by Sonia Levitin, illustrated by Cat Bowman Smith and published by Orchard Books. Boom Town tells the story of Amanda and her family after they move to California to accompany her father in his search for gold during the California Gold Rush. To alleviate her boredom, Amanda figures out how to bake pies, and by a combination of circumstance and cleverness she starts a successful bakery that kickstarts the settlement into becoming a boomtown.

Favorably reviewed at the time of its release, Boom Town was nominated for the Nebraska Golden Sower Award and was included in the Reading Teacher's 1999 Teacher's Choices list of recommended books for curriculum use.

== Background ==
Though she spent most of her career writing young adult fiction, author Sonia Levitin ventured into writing picture books in the late-twentieth century. One of these picture books was Nine for California. Published in 1996, Nine for California is a work of historical fiction about a girl named Amanda and her family's journey from Missouri to California during the California Gold Rush.

While reading a book about the history of California, Levitin noticed a description of a girl who, during the Gold Rush, baked $11,000 worth of pies. Inspired by this story, Levitin wrote Boom Town as a sequel to Nine for California, further developing the story of Amanda and her family.

== Contents ==
=== Summary ===
Boom Town is narrated in the first-person by Amanda. The book opens on Amanda and her family having moved to California where her father prospects for gold. The family's new home town is sparsely inhabited, including only "a stage stop, a pump house, a few log cabins." Out of boredom, Amanda figures out, after a few tries, how to bake gooseberry pie using her family's wood-fire stove. When Amanda's father reports that he sold her pie to other miners for 25 cents a slice, the experiment turns into a small business, and Amanda ropes her brothers into working for her in a bakery where she sells pies to local prospectors.

Amanda to Peddler Pete

Folks need things all the time, and there're no stores around. If you were to settle and start one, I'll bet you'd be rich.

— Amanda, in Boom Town

Amanda's impromptu pie business achieves success, and Amanda gradually convinces other travelers to settle down in the area and start shops. For example, she suggests to a peddler who sells her more pie pans that he open a trading post in town, and she persuades several others to start local businesses such as a livery yard and laundry. Reviewer Anne Scott MacLeod explains how thanks to these developments, "the settlement is a real town, all because of Amanda's enterprising spirit." Recognizing Amanda's success, her father gives up trying to strike gold and instead starts working for Amanda in her bakery, freeing her up to attend the town's new school.

At the end of the book, there is a historical note stating that many people who found success during the Gold Rush did so as entrepreneurs rather than as miners. This note also refers to the girl baker whose story inspired Boom Town. There is also a recipe for Amanda's gooseberry pie.

=== Illustrations ===
Cat Bowman Smith illustrated Boom Town with what Kirkus Reviews called "detailed watercolors". The hues are dusty and earthy. The Reading Teacher described the style as having "cartoonish flair". Smith's illustrations depict the landscape, the town, and the characters, from Amanda's baby sister to Amanda herself in her gingham dress. According to reviewer Anne Scott MacLeod, the characters' clothes, tools, and other details are accurate to the setting. Smith diversifies the book through her illustrations by including Black Americans and Asians in the town's cast.

== Publication ==
Orchard Books published Boom Town in March 1998. The book is 40 pages long. The pages are not numbered.

A paperback edition was published in 2004. Levitin wrote and Smith illustrated a sequel also starring Amanda titled Taking Charge, which Orchard Books published in 1999.

== Critical reception ==
School Library Journal excerpt

Amanda's narration lends just the right touch of humor to an authentic, though exaggerated look at the development of the West. Young readers will particularly enjoy the way the girl subtly manipulates so many adults into contributing to the town's amazing growth.

— Steven Engelfried

Boom Town received favorable book reviews. Kirkus called the book "a deeply satisfying story starring a resourceful heroine". In the School Library Journal, Steven Engelfried praised the narratorial voice for Amanda, stating the character added "just the right touch of humor to an authentic, though exaggerated look at the development of the West". According to education professor Debby Zambo, Boom Town has strong female characters.

Reviewers complimented the book's potential pedagogical value. Writing for Booklist, reviewer Lauren Peterson concluded that "True or not, this is an entertaining way to learn history." Reviewer Margaret A. Bush, writing for Horn Book Magazine, concluded that Levitin's "intent to demonstrate that far more settlers made fortunes by providing goods and services than by striking gold is adroitly accomplished in this entertaining lesson in history and human nature."

Smith's illustrations were also praised. Publishers Weekly stated that her "rollicking, dusty-toned watercolors capture the energy of a developing town and convey the can-do spirit of adventurous settlers." Writing for the New York Times, Anne Scott MacLeod called Smith's artwork "as spirited as Amanda ... loose, energetic, cheerful and full of accurate detail." Bush considered Smith's illustration work "comic and informative, conveying the busy lives of the homely, hard-working people".

The Reading Teacher included Boom Town in its 1999 Teachers' Choices list as one of two recommended books from the previous year for children ages five to eight years old and suggested that teachers could use Boom Town in curriculum as a companion to teaching about either the California Gold Rush or about frontier towns in the nineteenth-century United States. Boom Town was nominated for the Nebraska Golden Sower Award.

== See also ==
- Boomtown
- Gold rush
- "The Luck of Roaring Camp"
