= The Little Match Girl (Pinkney book) =

1999 book by Jerry Pinkney

- Author: Hans Christian Andersen
- Illustrator: Jerry Pinkney
- Language: English
- Genre: Children's literature, fairy tale, picture book
- Published: 1999 (Phyllis Fogelman Books)
- Publication place: United States
- Media type: Print (hardback)
- Pages: 32 (unpaginated)
- ISBN: 9780803723146
- OCLC: 40830108

The Little Match Girl is a 1999 adaptation of the classic Hans Christian Andersen story by Jerry Pinkney. It is about a girl who is a street vendor of artificial flowers and matches in a city during the early twentieth century and rather than returning home, as she hasn't made any sales, lights her matches to keep warm, sees wonderful visions, then dies and goes to heaven.

== Reception ==
Booklist, in a starred review of The Little Match Girl, wrote "The illustration of the match girl presents a challenge for artists, but Pinkney's interpretation is impressive." and "Because of the book's somber tone, some parents may object to the book's placement on the picture-book shelves, as CIP recommends. However, this is a beautifully illustrated version of a classic tale." School Library Journal wrote "There aren't too many versions of this somewhat maudlin tale available-if you need one, this is the one to buy." and The Horn Book Magazine found it "gracefully adapted".

Publishers Weekly also gave a starred review and called it "A faithful retelling of a classic tale.." and "as transcendent as Andersen's."

In addition, The Little Match Girl has been reviewed by Kirkus Reviews, and the Chicago Tribune.

== Awards ==
- 1999 Parents' Choice Picture Books Award - Gold Award
- 2000 Notable Social Studies Trade Books For Young People: Folktales, Myths and Legends - Selectors' Choice

== See also ==
- The Ugly Duckling (Pinkney book)
- The Nightingale (Pinkney book)
