= In for Winter, Out for Spring =

Book by Arnold Adoff

- Author: Arnold Adoff
- Illustrator: Jerry Pinkney
- Language: English
- Genre: Children's literature, picture book, Poetry
- Published: 1991 (Harcourt Brace Jovanovich)
- Publication place: USA
- Media type: Print (hardback)
- Pages: 48 (unpaginated)
- ISBN: 9780152386375
- OCLC: 21412368

In for Winter, Out for Spring is a 1991 picture book by Arnold Adoff and illustrator Jerry Pinkney. It is a collection of 28 poems about a girl, Rebecca, and her experiences with her family over a year.

== Reception ==
Booklist, in a review of In for Winter, Out for Spring, wrote "Adoff has worked with many fine illustrators, but never has his poetry been more radiantly expressed than in Pinkney's watercolor and colored-pencil art. ... The poetry is formatted in eye-catching designs that encourage effective reading, whether by adults or by middle-graders who will be able to handle this themselves."

School Library Journal wrote "While the meanings are readily accessible, it will take sophisticated readers to read these poems alone. ... These poems would be best read aloud and discussed."

In for Winter, Out for Spring has also been reviewed by Kirkus Reviews, Publishers Weekly, and Texas Child Care Quarterly.
