= Puss in Boots (Pinkney book) =

2012 picture book by Jerry Pinkney

- First edition
- Author: Jerry Pinkney
- Illustrator: Jerry Pinkney
- Language: English
- Genre: Children's literature, picture book, Fairy tale
- Published: 2012 (Dial Books for Young Readers)
- Publication place: USA
- Media type: Print (hardback, paperback)
- Pages: 40 (unpaginated)
- ISBN: 9780803716421
- OCLC: 764583729

Puss in Boots is a 2012 picture book of the classic fairy tale by Jerry Pinkney. Based on Charles Perrault's version, it is about a cat that enables his owner to achieve fame and fortune.

== Reception ==
School Library Journal, in a review of Puss in Boots, wrote "The text clearly relates the plot with lyrical language and vivacious energy, and the color-pencil and watercolor artwork showcases the period's costumes, architecture, and landscapes."

The Horn Book Magazine wrote "Pinkney stays close to Perrault's written version of the story (according to the artist's note, Pinkney chose to set the tale in France in 1729, the date of the English publication of "Puss in Boots"), providing sumptuous watercolor, gouache, and colored-pencil illustrations that place realistic natural elements like animals and trees side by side with the ostentatious embellishments in the eighteenth-century clothing and furnishings of the human characters."

Puss in Boots has also been reviewed by Publishers Weekly, Booklist, Kirkus Reviews, The Bulletin of the Center for Children's Books, and Library Media Connection.
