= Three Little Kittens (Pinkney book) =

Book by Jerry Pinkney

- First edition
- Author: Jerry Pinkney
- Illustrator: Jerry Pinkney
- Language: English
- Genre: Children's picture book
- Published: 2010 (Dial Books for Younger Readers)
- Publication place: United States
- Media type: Print (hardback)
- Pages: 34 (unpaginated)
- ISBN: 9780803735330
- OCLC: 502150585

Three Little Kittens is a 2010 children's picture book of the classic nursery rhyme adapted and illustrated by Jerry Pinkney.

== Reception ==
Booklist's review of Three Little Kittens stated "Throughout, the sense of play is fun and contagious, the threat of punishment gentle but firm, and the rhyme limited yet effective.", and Horn Book Guide wrote "Young readers will get wrapped up in the light, relatable-to-kids dramatics.". School Library Journal described it as a "sumptuous edition" concluding "This is another superb entry in the artist's catalog of classics for a new generation." The Library Media Connection magazine called it "a must-have for cat people and Pinkney fans, and those who need an updated version of this tale."

Three Little Kittens has also been reviewed by Kirkus Reviews, and Publishers Weekly.
