= The Mark of Conte =

Book by Sonia Levitin

First edition (publ. Atheneum Books)

The Mark of Conte is a children's book written by American author Sonia Levitin.

It concerns a teenager who creates two identities in his high school computer in order to garner his required credits in a shorter time. Although the main plot line is fictional, the character Conte Mark (aka Mark Conte) is based on Sonia Levitin's son Daniel Levitin, and some incidents are based on his actual experiences as a student at Palos Verdes High School, in Los Angeles County, in the 1970s.
