= The Little Red Hen (Pinkney book) =

2006 book by Jerry Pinkney

- Front cover, designed by Jerry Pinkney
- Author: Jerry Pinkney
- Illustrator: Jerry Pinkney
- Language: English
- Genre: Children's literature, folklore, picture book
- Published: 2006 (The Dial Press)
- Publication place: United States
- Media type: Print (hardback)
- Pages: 32 (unpaginated)
- ISBN: 9780803729353
- OCLC: 60414351

The Little Red Hen is a 2006 book by Jerry Pinkney of the classic folktale about a chicken and some animals that decline to assist her in the growing and harvesting of wheat which she then uses to bake bread. When the animals ask to have some, she refuses and instead eats the bread with her chicks.

== Reception ==
The Horn Book Magazine, in a review of The Little Red Hen, wrote that "rhythmic text and color-coded type make this story about the rewards of cooperation perfect for reading aloud", while Booklist called it "a solid addition to the folklore shelves".

The Little Red Hen has also been reviewed by Publishers Weekly, School Library Journal, Kirkus Reviews, Library Media Connection magazine, Common Sense Media, and The New York Times.

== Awards ==
- 2006 New York Times 10 Best Illustrated Books of the Year
- 2007 ALA Notable Children's Book
