= Back Home (Pinkney book) =

1992 picture book by Gloria Jean Pinkney

- First edition
- Author: Gloria Jean Pinkney
- Illustrator: Jerry Pinkney
- Language: English
- Genre: Children's literature, picture book
- Published: 1992 (Dial Press)
- Publication place: United States
- Media type: Print (hardback)
- Pages: 40
- ISBN: 9780803711686
- OCLC: 23973973

Back Home is a 1992 children's picture book by Gloria Jean Pinkney, illustrated by her husband Jerry Pinkney. Published in 1992 by Dial Press, it centers around the autobiographical story of a young girl, Ernestine, who visits her extended family in North Carolina where she was born. The prequel, The Sunday Outing, published in 1994, takes place in the city and describes her family chipping in for the train ride which enables her to realize the dream of traveling to her birthplace.

== Reception ==
The Booklist and School Library Journal reviews of Back Home, wrote, "This is more a reminiscence than a plotted story, warm with Southern summer and family affection, a vignette of times gone by and roots rediscovered." Publishers Weekly wrote "Gloria Pinkney's text has a relaxed pace that is perfectly suited to the summer setting. Her characterizations are particularly well drawn, and her dialogue thoroughly convincing. In some of Jerry Pinkney's finest work, sunlight filters through his pencil and watercolor illustrations, imbuing them with a feathery soft glow."

Back Home has also been reviewed by Kirkus Reviews, The Horn Book Magazine, and the Smithsonian.

== See also ==
- The Sunday Outing
