= Lloyd Levitin =

Lloyd A. Levitin
- Born: 1932 (age 93–94)
- Education: University of California (BS); Wharton School (MBA); University of San Francisco (JD)
- Occupations: Management expert, cfo, professor
- Spouse: Sonia Levitin

Lloyd A. Levitin (born 1932) is an American businessman, former business executive and currently professor of clinical finance and business economics at the University of Southern California's Marshall School of Business. He teaches financial analysis and valuation courses in the full-time MBA and undergraduate programs. He has published articles on corporate diversification and accountants' scope of liability for defective financial reports. He was simultaneously executive vice president, treasurer and chief financial officer of Pacific Enterprises (now Sempra Energy), as well as executive vice president and chief financial officer of the Southern California Gas Company (wholly owned subsidiary of Pacific Enterprises). He has 31 years of experience in corporate management. Prior thereto, he was associate professor of business at San Francisco State University. He also has a CPA certificate.

On June 6, 1996, he testified before the Committee on Banking, Housing, and Urban Affairs of the United States Senate regarding the proposed Public Utility Holding Company Act of 1996, S. 1317.

His analysis of the financial health of Southern Pacific Rail Corporation persuaded the United States Department of Justice to permit the merger of Southern Pacific with Union Pacific in 1996.

Education: JD, University of San Francisco (1961). MBA, University of Pennsylvania, Wharton School of Finance and Commerce (1956). BS in Accounting, University of California (1954).

He is married to Sonia Levitin, a novelist, and has two children, Daniel Levitin and Shari Levitin. He and his wife are among the founders of the Moraga Historical Society.
