= Rabbit Makes a Monkey of Lion =

Book by Verna Aardema

- First edition
- Author: Verna Aardema
- Illustrator: Jerry Pinkney
- Language: English
- Genre: Children's picture book,
- Published: 1989 (Dial Press)
- Publication place: United States
- Media type: Print (hardback)
- Pages: 28 (unpaginated)
- ISBN: 9780803702981
- OCLC: 13581887

Rabbit Makes a Monkey of Lion: A Swahili Tale is a 1989 children's picture book by Verna Aardema and illustrated by Jerry Pinkney. It is an adaption of a Swahili folktale and is about Rabbit tricking Lion over a calabash tree.

== Reception ==
Publishers Weekly reviewed Rabbit Makes a Monkey of Lion writing "Aardema offers up a sound piece of storytelling, admirably reflected in Pinkney's full-color watercolor and pencil illustrations; he composes a lush jungle setting for the folksy antics, and brings drama to the text with his depictions of the various escapes from the hapless Lion." and the New York Times described Pinkney's illustrations as having "a velvety softness".

Rabbit Makes a Monkey of Lion has also been reviewed by the School Library Journal, and Booklist.

== See also ==
- Br'er Rabbit
