= In Plain Sight (Jackson book) =

- Author: Richard Jackson
- Illustrator: Jerry Pinkney
- Language: English
- Genre: Children's literature, Poetry
- Published: 2016 (Roaring Brook Press)
- Publication place: USA
- Media type: Print (hardback, paperback)
- Pages: 32 (unpaginated)
- ISBN: 9781626722552
- OCLC: 928488455

In Plain Sight is a 2016 book by Richard Jackson and illustrator Jerry Pinkney. It is about a girl, Sophie, who, every day after school, helps her grandfather to find a small item that he has supposedly lost.

== Reception ==
School Library Journal gave a starred review of In Plain Sight, writing "The simple text is largely made up of the good-natured conversations that surround the game and reflect the warmth and joy that Sophie and Grandpa find in each other. Pinkney’s lush and lovely watercolors are by turns delicate, energetic, and effusive as he captures his engaging African American characters and their homey domicile."

The Bulletin of the Center for Children's Books wrote "Especially in connection with some thoughtful prompting, this may encourage kids to think about their own relatives in new ways, and it could be an interesting introduction to a foster grandparent program."

In Plain Sight has also been reviewed by Booklist, Common Sense Media, The Horn Book Magazine, and has received starred reviews from Kirkus Reviews, and Publishers Weekly.

It received a 2017 Coretta Scott King Award author honor
