= Michael J. Bobbitt =

American dramatist

Michael J. Bobbitt is an American playwright, director, choreographer, and performing arts leader based in Boston. He is currently president and CEO of Opera America. Bobbitt was the artistic director of Adventure Theatre-MTC, the longest-running children's theater in the Washington metropolitan area, for 12 years before becoming artistic director of the New Repertory Theatre in greater Boston on August 1, 2019. Bobbitt's work has been recognized frequently as both a nominee and a recipient of the annual Helen Hayes Awards for excellence in theater.

== Career ==
After joining Adventure Theatre as artistic director in 2007, Bobbitt transitioned the organization from a volunteer-run community theater to a nationally recognized leading children’s theater and training academy, ATMTC Academy. Under his direction, the company grew from 15,000 patrons to more than 100,000 and received more than 50 Helen Hayes Award nominations and eight awards. He guided Adventure Theatre through its 2012 merger with Musical Theatre Center, which created the new entity, Adventure Theatre-MTC.

Bobbitt has commissioned and premiered more than 50 new plays for young audiences. He has co-authored or adapted several stories for the stage, including Mirandy and Brother Wind, Bob Marley's Three Little Birds, Caps for Sale, Garfield the Musical with Cattitude, and Jumanji. He has also overseen the development of ATMTC Academy, the theater's conservatory and pre-professional training program for young people.

In addition to his work at Adventure Theatre-MTC and New Repertory, Bobbitt has directed or choreographed productions at Arena Stage, Ford’s Theatre, The Shakespeare Theatre, Studio Theatre, Woolly Mammoth Theatre Company, Center Stage, Roundhouse Theatre, Rorshach Theatre Company, Strathmore, The Kennedy Center, Helen Hayes Awards and Washington National Opera. His national and international credits include the NY Musical Theatre Festival, Mel Tillis 2001, La Jolla Playhouse, Jefferson Performing Arts Center, and 1996 Olympics.

A focus of Bobbitt's work has been to reach out to underserved populations and increase cultural diversity in theater for young children. He has been an innovator in offering Sensory friendly performances for children with autism. He mounted Adventure Theatre's first sensory friendly performance—a production of If You Give a Mouse a Cookie—in 2008.

Bobbitt, a Helen Hayes Awards nominee and recipient, co-hosted the Helen Hayes Award ceremony in 2018.

In August 2019, Bobbitt joined the New Repertory Theatre in Watertown, MA as their new artistic director. Starting in 2021 Bobbitt served as executive director of the Massachusetts Cultural Council. In January 2026 he became president and CEO of Opera America.

== Early life and training ==
Bobbitt is a native of Washington, D.C., one of five sons of an auto mechanic and a financial manager. He was educated in D.C. public schools through eighth grade, and then attended Gonzaga College High School, graduating in the class of 1990. He attended Susquehanna University in Pennsylvania on an academic and trumpet scholarship, and moved to New York after one year to study at the Dance Theatre of Harlem. He also trained at Washington Ballet, American Musical and Dramatic Academy, and Cap21.

== Personal life ==
Bobbitt is openly gay.

== Honors and civic activities ==
2015: Excel Leadership Award from the Center for Nonprofit Advancement

2015: Maryland Theatre Guide Person of the Year Award

2010: County Executive’s Excellence in the Arts and Humanities – Emerging Leader Award

Board member, Rockville (Maryland) Chamber of Commerce

Board member, The Nonprofit Village
