= Twinkle, Twinkle, Little Star (Pinkney book) =

Book by Jane Taylor

- First edition cover of Twinkle, Twinkle, Little Star
- Author: Jane Taylor
- Illustrator: Jerry Pinkney
- Language: English
- Genre: Children's picture book
- Published: 2011 (Little, Brown)
- Publication place: United States
- Media type: Print (hardback)
- Pages: 34 (unpaginated)
- ISBN: 978-0-316056-96-0
- OCLC: 809223512

Twinkle, Twinkle, Little Star is a 2011 children's picture book of Jane Taylor's classic nursery rhyme adapted and illustrated by Jerry Pinkney. It is about a chipmunk that travels to the moon.

== Reception ==
Kirkus Reviews in a starred review of Twinkle, Twinkle, Little Star called it a "sumptuous elaboration of the familiar lullaby" and concluded "Just another superb outing from a fixed star twinkling in the children’s-literature firmament." and Publishers Weekly wrote "Pinkney’s flora and fauna are exquisite, as is his palette, dominated by rich earth tones and brilliant blues. Soothing and magical, this one should conjure some sweet dreams."

Twinkle, Twinkle, Little Star has also been reviewed by Booklist, Horn Book Guide, The School Library Journal, and The Bulletin of the Center for Children's Books.
