= The Talking Eggs (picture book) =

1989 picture book by Robert D. San Souci

The Talking Eggs: A Folktale from the American South
- First edition
- Author: Robert D. San Souci
- Illustrator: Jerry Pinkney
- Language: English
- Genre: Children's picture book, folklore
- Published: 1989 (The Dial Press)
- Publication place: United States
- Media type: Print (hardback)
- Pages: 32 (unpaginated)
- ISBN: 9780803706194
- OCLC: 18873666

The Talking Eggs: A Folktale from the American South is a 1989 children's picture book by Robert D. San Souci and illustrated by Jerry Pinkney. It is an adaption of a Creole folktale, first recorded in 1895 by Alcée Fortier's Louisiana Folk Tales, about a young girl who is mistreated by her mother and older sister, meets an old woman in the woods, and receives some eggs that contains treasures.

== Plot ==
An impoverished widow has two daughters and runs a farm that raises chickens and grows beans and cotton. Rose is the oldest and mean. Blanche is the youngest and kind. The mother favors Rose more and forces Blanche to do all the work while Rose and her mother sit on the porch and fantasize moving to the city.

One day, Blanche meets an old woman at the well who asks for some water to quench her thirst. Blanche gives her some water. This makes her late when bringing the water to her mother and sister. Blanche is scolded and beaten and she runs off into the woods where she meets the old woman again.

The old woman takes Blanche to her house deep in the woods to live with her for a while. As the branches open the path to the old woman's house, she advises Blanche not to laugh at anything there. When they entered the old woman's property, Blanche finds that the old woman owns a two-headed cow with corkscrew-like horns that brayed like a mule. There were also multi-colored chickens that whistle like mockingbirds with some of them hopping around on one leg, some having three legs, and some having four legs.

There, Blanche behaves well and follows the old woman's orders. As she went to get firewood, the old woman removed her head in order to brush her two long braids. After putting her head back on, she gave Blanche a beef bone to put in the pot which soon filled with stew. When Blanche was given a single grain of rice to grind in the stone mortar, it overflowed with rice. The day is closed out by a night dance from rabbits in clothes where one of them played the banjo.

The next morning, Blanche milks the two-headed cow which produces sweet milk. Before sending Blanche home, the old woman takes her to the chicken house and tells her to take the eggs that say "take me" and to leave the eggs that say "don't take me". Once she is close to home, Blanche is instructed to throw them over her shoulder and she will get a surprise when the eggs break.

Blanche goes into the chicken house and finds a collection of eggs, some plain and some jeweled. All of the plain eggs say "take me" and the fancy-looking ones say "don't take me." Blanche only takes the plain eggs as she was told. When she tosses them over her shoulder to her surprise, gems, money, and dresses come out of them, along with a horse and carriage which Blanche rides the rest of the way home.

When Blanche arrives home, her mother and sister help Blanche carry the riches inside and pretend to show kindness towards her. However, the two ladies are extremely jealous of what has happened to Blanche. Her mother hatches a plan for Rose to find the old woman, get her own set of riches like her sister got, and come back. The mother plans to abandon Blanche at the home while she and Rose move to the city.

The next morning, the old woman is accosted by Rose in the field, who mentions her sister to her. The old woman takes her back to her house, where Rose does the exact opposite of everything Blanche was told to do which disappoints the old woman. After going to bed hungry because she did not believe in the rice or beef bone trick and getting sour milk from the two-headed cow because she laughed at it, a frustrated Rose picks up the old woman's head after she takes it off and demands the same things Blanche got. The old woman, convinced Rose is wicked, sends her to the chicken house with the same instructions she gave Blanche.

As before, the plain eggs said "take me" while the fancy eggs said "don't take me". Rose immediately is drawn to the fancy eggs and grabs them all, then leaves the house. Rose eventually reaches the spot where she is supposed to throw the eggs and does so, expecting to be showered with riches. Instead, she receives the exact opposite and is chased home by a bunch of attacking whip snakes, toads, frogs, yellowjackets, and a big old gray wolf. Rose makes it home. The animals attack her mother as well after she tried to fight them off with her broom as they are chased deep into the woods.

By the time they returned home angry, sore, stung, and covered with mud, Rose and her mother found that Blanche had left for the city to live like a grand lady. Blanche remained kind and generous as always. For the rest of their lives, Rose and her mother have not been able to find the old woman's cabin and the talking eggs. They were unable to find that place again.

== Characters ==
- Blanche - The youngest daughter is she's sweet, kind and caring. She's sharp as forty crickets.
- Rose - The oldest daughter who is cruel, selfish, and mean.
- The Mother - Rose and Blanche's unnamed mother. She's cruel, bad-tempered, and favors Rose more than Blanche.
- Old Woman - A magical elderly woman who lives on a magical farm and can remove her head in order to brush her two braids.

== Reception ==
Common Sense Media in its review of The Talking Eggs, wrote "Robert D. San Souci captures the reader's attention with simple language that brings the country setting to life: "They lived on a farm so poor, it looked like the tail end of bad luck." And Jerry Pinkney's watercolors convey the sharp contrast between Blanche's difficult home life and the hilarious celebration at the old woman's home."

Kirkus Reviews, wrote "A lively retelling of a rather hard-hearted Creole version of a widely collected folktale." and the School Library Journal called it "a unique contribution to the American folktale repertoire"

The Talking Eggs has also been reviewed by Publishers Weekly, and Booklist.

== Awards ==
- 1989 Coretta Scott King Book Illustration Award - honor
- 1989 Irma Simonton Black Book Award - winner
- 1990 Caldecott Medal - honor

== See also ==
- The Spinning-Woman by the Spring - A collection of related stories.
- Toads and Diamonds
