= Jennifer Armstrong (writer) =

American children's writer

- Born: May 19, 1961 (age 65); Waltham, Massachusetts, U.S.
- Education: Smith College
- Occupation: Writer
- Writing career
- Genre: Children's literature

Jennifer Mary Armstrong (born May 19, 1961) is an American children's writer known for both fiction and non-fiction. She was born in Waltham, Massachusetts, grew up outside of New York City, and now lives in Saratoga Springs, New York. She was formerly married to the author James Howard Kunstler.

As an author who has utilized multiple types of narrative structures, Armstrong believes that

A short story is only one of many narrative structures. We create narrative with jokes, ballads, tales, novels, poems, anecdotes, etc... While there are many satisfactions to be found in the conventional beginning-middle-end narrative that is common in short fiction for kids, I believe young readers can respond to many other forms of short narrative.

After 9/11, she wrote that books can be the "enemy of violent zealotry" and work against chaos and fear.

== Mairhe Mehan ==
Intended for middle-school-aged readers, Armstrong wrote this series of five books about an Irish family living in Swampoodle, Washington, D.C. during the Civil War. The family- composed of a drunken father, his son- a bricklayer during the construction of the Capitol building- and his daughter Mairhe, who works at the Shinny, the local pub. There, Mairhe hears patrons discussing the war; though she believes the Irish should not take sides, others see it as "a means to free slaves who will then push them even further down the economic scale in the competitive job market." Her brother Mike joins the Union army, causing her to contemplate the reasoning of Irish loyalty to either side of the war. While working she meets Walt Whitman, who acts as a symbolic unifier to her conflicting feelings by showing her how to open up to new people. In the afterword to Becoming Mary Mehan, Armstrong states that after finishing The Dreams of Mairhe Mehan, she took a train to northern Canada with only one book: a collection of essays about the pioneering naturalists of North America. With that, she received the inspiration for the plot of Mary Mehan Awake. Although historically "well-researched," in one book Armstrong misplaced the building of the Capitol in the 1860s despite its completion by 1830. However, she accurately portrays Whitman in Brooklyn on the day after Lincoln's funeral. The Dreams of Mairhe Mehan was listed on the 1998 Young Adult Choices list as a result of being voted in the top 30 by students in American schools grades 7-12.

== Shipwreck at the Bottom of the World ==
This non-fiction narrative details the 1914-1916 expedition to Antarctica led by Sir Ernest Shackleton on the Endurance. His vessel was shipwrecked and frozen on ice for 10 months until pressure finally crushed it. The crew camped on the ice for five months before crossing the open in two open boats to South Georgia Island. The book contains more than 40 vintage photographs taken during the expedition. For her writing and research Armstrong was selected as an Orbis Pictus Award winner.

== Shattered: Stories of Children and War ==
Armstrong edited and contributed one piece ("Witness") to this collection, which features works by Ibtisam Barakat, Joseph Bruchac, Lisa Rowe Fraustino, Marijane Meaker, David Lubar, Lois Metzger, Gloria D. Miklowitz, Dian Curtis Regan, Graham Salisbury, Marilyn Singer, and Suzanne Fisher Staples. It was selected by Chris Crowe as one of fifty short story collections worth reading.

== Fire-Us Trilogy ==
The Fire-Us Trilogy (Book 1: The Kindling, Book 2: Keepers of the Flame, and Book 3: The Kiln) is a series of post-apocalyptic young adult fiction by Jennifer Armstrong and Nancy Butcher. The series begins in 2007, five years after a plague of unknown origin has killed the vast majority of the human population. The plot concerns the family, a group of orphan children living in the small fictional town of Lazarus, Florida. The older children, now approaching adolescence, attempt to emulate the behavior of the "first families" to which they belonged before the plague. Armstrong and Butcher depict the children as traumatized and ill-equipped to handle the world around them, the youngest being barely more than toddlers at the time of the "Fire-Us," the children's name for the contagion. Teacher takes on the responsibility of educating the younger children, Baby, Doll, Teddy Bear (her brother) and Action Figure (Hunter's brother). Teacher compulsively collects information concerning the Fire-Us and the collapsed civilization in The Book, a scrapbook which she adds to in a trancelike state. In reality, The Book seems to be a meaningless collection of advertisements, half-remembered news segments, and bits of instruction manuals. Fourteen-year-old Mommy acts as a maternal figure to the younger children, attempting to feed them a nutritious diet. She refuses to leave the house, and suffers from extreme agoraphobia. Both Mommy and Teacher are frequently frustrated by Action Figure, who frequently skips lessons and meals to go out scavenging with Hunter, an older boy- also fourteen- who searches Lazarus for rapidly dwindling food.

As the family comes to grips with their increasingly desperate situation, they encounter a disturbed older boy who wanders into Lazarus dragging a mannequin on his back. The family calls him Angerman, a mispronunciation of "Anchorman", because of his tendency to give semi-coherent monologues in the style of a newscaster. The "news" often ends with Angerman succumbing to his own frustration at not being able to remember the events he is "reporting". Angerman's thought process is constantly interrupted by the hostile commentary of Bad Guy, the boy's name for the mannequin he carries with him. Angerman blames Bad Guy for the Fire-Us in particular, and frequently attacks the mannequin to "shut him up", although Angerman is the only one who hears Bad Guy "talking". Concurrent with Angerman's arrival is the discovery of Puppy and Kitty, two small children who speak only in animal noises. These children amaze the Family, as they clearly were born after the Fire-us, though all the adults were supposedly killed.

After hearing one of Angerman's "reports", the family hatches a plan to travel to Washington D.C. to find the President. On their way, they encounter the Keepers, a group of religious fundamentalist adults living in an abandoned mall, and a helpful enclave of elderly women living in a retirement community. The Keepers, who name themselves after Bible verses, believe the Fire-us was a miracle sent to cleanse the Earth and allow the chosen ones to start afresh. An adolescent girl, Cory- named after a verse in Corinthians- has grown disillusioned with the movement after her older sister was "chosen" to become one of the leader's companions, and she joins the Family as they head to Camp David, where the President supposedly is, the Keepers hot on their trail.

At Camp David, it is revealed that the President is none other than the leader of the Keepers, and it was he who unleashed the original Fire-us in order to create the "Second Coming" of God while protecting himself and his followers in a bunker. Because all of the children from Lazarus are pre-pubescent at the time the virus was first released, they were exempt from the fictional disease which affects only those who produce sexual hormones. The President has since been bringing young girls to his camp in an attempt to recreate a new race all descended from him, subjecting the children born to these two girls to a trial by fire that few survive.

Puppy and Kitty (who are revealed to be the children of Cory's sister), are captured and are going to be submitted to this trial. Before they can, Angerman kidnaps the President and holds him at gunpoint, despite the fact that the President is holding another vial of the Fire-us, which, if broken, could destroy the world again. Angerman is mad with grief, having realized that the President is, in fact, his father, and yet left himself, his brother, Sam, and his mother to die while he saved his followers. In the end, Cory manages to take the gun and lock herself and the President in one of the air-tight bunkers as the vial breaks, saving the world (it is implied she also shoots him and herself, rather than die of the disease). The series ends on a note of hope, as the family decides to head to Washington state in search of a new home and other survivors.

== Works ==
- Sunshine, moonshine"
- The Puppy Project (1990)
- Too Many Pets (1990)
- Hugh Can Do (1992)
- Chin Yu Min and the Ginger Cat, illustrated by Mary GrandPré (Crown Publishers, 1993)
- Steal Away to Freedom (1993)
- That Terrible Baby (1994)
- Wild Rose Inn series (1994) — Ann of the Wild Rose Inn; Emily of the Wild Rose Inn; Bridie of the Wild Rose Inn; Laura of the Wild Rose Inn; Claire of the Wild Rose Inn; Grace of the Wild Rose Inn
- The Whittler's Tale (1994)
- Little Salt Lick and the Sun King (1994)
- King Crow (1995)
- Wan Hu is in the Stars (1995)
- The Dreams of Mairhe Mehan (1996)
- Lili the Brave (1997)
- Foolish Gretel (1997)
- Shipwreck at the Bottom of the World: The Extraordinary True Story of Shackleton and the Endurance (1998)
- Mary Mehan Awake (1997)
- Pockets, illus. Mary GrandPré (Knopf, 1998), picture book, OCLC 36573735
- Patrick Doyle is Full of Blarney (1999)
- Pierre's Dream (1999), Armstrong and Susan Gaber
- Spirit of Endurance (2000)
- Dear Mr. President series (2000)
  - Thomas Jefferson: letters from a Philadelphia bookworm
  - Theodore Roosevelt: letters from a young coal miner
- Becoming Mary Mehan (2002)
- In My Hands: Memories of a Holocaust Rescuer (2002), Armstrong and Irene Gut Opdyke
- Fire-Us trilogy (2002–2005), written by Armstrong and Nancy Butcher
  - Book 1: The Kindling
  - Book 2: Keepers of the Flame
  - Book 3: The Kiln
- Sunshine, Moonshine (2003)
- Audubon: Painter of Birds in the Wild Frontier (2003), Armstrong and Joseph Anthony Smith
- "Witness" in Shattered: Stories of Children and War (2003), edited by Armstrong
- A Three-Minute Speech: Lincoln's Remarks at Gettysburg (2003), Armstrong and Albert Lorenz
- Magnus at the Fire (2005), Armstrong and Owen Smith
- Photo by Brady: a Picture of the Civil War (2005), Armstrong and Mathew B. Brady
- A Heart for Any Fate: Westward to Oregon, 1845 (2005), Armstrong and Linda Crew
- What a Song Can Do: 12 Riffs on the Power of Music (2006)
- The American Story: 100 True Tales from American History (2006), Armstrong and Roger Roth
- Once Upon a Banana (2006), Armstrong and David Small
- Anything is Possible (2006)
- The Poet's Basket (2006)
- Black-eyed Susan (2008)
- The Snowball (2009)
- Minus the Morning (2009)
- The Century for Young People: Changing America 1961-1999 (2009) Armstrong, Peter Jennings, and Todd Brewster

== See also ==
- Children's Literature
