= Rikki-Tikki-Tavi =

1894 short story in The Jungle Book by Rudyard Kipling

Later edition cover of "Rikki-Tikki-Tavi" by Rudyard Kipling

"Rikki-Tikki-Tavi" is a short story in the 1894 short story collection The Jungle Book by Rudyard Kipling about adventures of a valiant young Indian grey mongoose. It has often been anthologised and published several times as a short book. Kipling was likely inspired by Book 5 of Panchatantra, an ancient Indian collection, which includes a mongoose and snake story.

== Plot ==
Nearly drowned from an intense seasonal thunderstorm, a curious and adventurous mongoose — later named Rikki-Tikki-Tavi for his chattering vocalisations — is rescued by a small British family, a husband and wife and their son Teddy residing in a large home and garden in India. After Rikki revives he explores the house and quickly endears himself to the family. He spends his first night there cuddling with Teddy as he sleeps; the wife fears that Rikki will bite Teddy, but the husband assures her that Teddy is safer with Rikki than if he had a bloodhound to watch him.

The next morning, Rikki explores the house and garden where he befriends other creatures including Darzee, a carefree tailorbird and his sensible wife, and Chuchundra, a timid "muskrat". But he soon encounters two cobras named Nag and his mate Nagaina who are highly protective of what they deem to be their territory, and now fear Rikki as a threat to their unborn children. Scared at first, Rikki soon remembers that a mongoose's purpose is to fight and kill snakes, and fends them both off after a brief skirmish; after they slip away, Rikki realises he now has his work cut out for him, not only with the fact that he cannot take on two cobras at once, but also that there's no herbal antidote for a cobra's bite.

Later that day, a dust-brown snakeling named Karait threatens Teddy. Unaware that the smaller snake is even more dangerous than a cobra, Rikki fights and kills Karait, and then presents its body to the husband as proof of the mongoose's victory, earning him praise. That night, Rikki goes for his nightly walk and meets Chuchundra, who tells him the cobras are near. Rikki overhears Nag and Nagaina scheming to kill the family to take over the house for their hatchlings and drive Rikki away. Nag enters the house's bathroom before dawn, waiting for the kill. But Rikki is able to sneak up on Nag and makes the first move by ambushing him from above in the darkness, tightly biting down on his hood. The ensuing struggle awakens the husband, who shoots and apparently kills Nag with a shotgun. The husband praises Rikki for his heroism.

The next day, a mourning Nagaina swears vengeance, and on Rikki's direction, Darzee's wife diverts Nagaina as Rikki destroys all but one of the cobra eggs. But the subterfuge is temporary as Nagaina goes to the house veranda and threatens to strike Teddy while his parents helplessly watch. Holding the last cobra egg, Rikki taunts and distracts Nagaina as Teddy is pulled to safety, and tells her that Nag was already dead when the husband shot him; for it was Rikki who slew Nag. As they fight, Nagaina grabs her egg and quickly retreats, but Rikki chases her down a rat hole (where the two cobras once lived), even though mongooses usually tend to avoid them. Fearing the worst, Darzee mourns Rikki's death via song, but moments later when Rikki emerges and declares Nagaina dead, Darzee changes his tune from sadness to elation.

With the immediate danger neutralised, Rikki dedicates himself to protecting his new home, ensuring that no snake would dare show its head within its walls.

== Adaptations ==
Rikki-Tikki-Tavi in Chuck Jones' animated film

Director Alexandra Snezhko-Blotskaya shot an animated short film of this story titled Рикки-Тикки-Тави (Rikki-Tikki-Tavi) in 1965 in the Soviet Union, at the film studio Soyuzmultfilm, changing the nationality of the family from British to Indian. Ten years later, Chuck Jones adapted it for a half-hour television special in the United States, with Orson Welles narrating and providing the voice of Nag. The same year, Aleksandr Zguridi and Nana Kldiashvili directed a live-action feature film titled Rikki-Tikki-Tavi.

In the anime television series Jungle Book Shōnen Mowgli, Rikki-Tikki-Tavi is a supporting character who is the pet of an Indian family and is a heroic defender of them.

In the CGI series The Jungle Book, Rikki-Tikki-Tavi is an occasional character who is a friend of Mowgli.

The story was adapted as a picture book of the same name in 1997 by Jerry Pinkney.

Donovan's album Open Road has the song "Riki Tiki Tavi", which has lyrics based on the story.
