= John Henry (picture book) =

Book by Julius Lester

- Author: Julius Lester
- Illustrator: Jerry Pinkney
- Language: English
- Genre: Children's literature, Folk tale, picture book
- Published: 1994 (Dial Press)
- Publication place: United States
- Media type: Print (hardback)
- Pages: 40
- ISBN: 9780803716063
- OCLC: 28966718
- Jane Byers Bierhorst is credited as the book designer

John Henry is a 1994 children's picture book by Julius Lester and illustrated by Jerry Pinkney. It is about the American legendary figure John Henry. In 1998, a 19-minute film adaptation of the book was narrated by Samuel L. Jackson and released by Weston Woods Studios.

== Reception ==
The Horn Book Magazine, in a review of John Henry, wrote "The original legend of John Henry .. has been enhanced and enriched, in Lester's retelling, with wonderful contemporary details and poetic similes that add humor, beauty, and strength." and called the book's illustrations "little short of magnificent." Booklist wrote "Like Lester's great collections of the Uncle Remus tales, also illustrated by Pinkney, the story is told with rhythm and wit, humor and exaggeration, and with a heart-catching immediacy that connects the human and the natural world."

Publishers Weekly gave a starred review finding it an "epic retelling" and concluded "This may not supplant more traditional retellings, such as Terry Small's The Legend of John Henry, but it is a triumph of collaboration from the creators of the noted Uncle Remus retellings."

John Henry has also been reviewed by Kirkus Reviews, School Library Journal, Book Links, Teacher Librarian, and Library Talk.

== Awards ==
- 1994 Parents' Choice Award - Gold Award
- 1995 Boston Globe–Horn Picture Book Award - winner
- 1995 Caldecott Medal - honor
