= Aesop's Fables (Pinkney book) =

- First edition cover of Aesop's Fables
- Author: Aesop
- Illustrator: Jerry Pinkney
- Language: English
- Genre: Children's literature, fable, picture book
- Published: 2000 (SeaStar Books)
- Publication place: United States
- Media type: Print (hardback)
- Pages: 87
- ISBN: 9781587170003
- OCLC: 43798267

Aesop's Fables is a 2000 collection of 61 fables from the Aesop oeuvre, retold by Jerry Pinkney. It includes stories about wolves, foxes, lions, dogs, mice, and donkeys.

== Reception ==
Rosemary Wells, reviewing Aesop's Fables wrote "Pinkney's Aesop is a visual treat. These are beautiful illustrations, combining pencil, colored pencil and watercolor with a light-as-air touch. .. The book is handsomely designed, in a large format, and fine paper sets off the illustrations to their best advantage."

School Library Journal found it "reminiscent of early 20th-century Aesop collections for children.", using "elevated language and an extremely formal sentence structure.", that "becomes a bit of a stumbling block." and concluded "While the narrative style occasionally gets in the way of sharing aloud and its tone is sometimes at odds with the more relaxed tone of the art, this handsome title is still one of the best of the current crop." The Horn Book Magazine called it "quintessential Aesop" and wrote "The text begs to be read aloud; .. The whole is an exemplary model of bookmaking-and one destined to become a favorite version of these tales."

Publishers Weekly gave a starred review writing "Beautifully designed, this lush, oversize volume showcases Pinkney's (The Ugly Duckling) artistry in grand style."and concluded " If there's room on the shelf for only one picture book version of Aesop, this could be it."

Aesop's Fables has also been reviewed by Booklist, Library Media Connection magazine, Library Talk, Parenting, and Kirkus Reviews.
