= Jess Mowry =

American novelist

- Born: March 27, 1960 (age 66) near Starkville, Mississippi, U.S.
- Occupation: Author
- Writing career
- Notable awards: PEN Oakland/Josephine Miles Literary Award (1991)

Jess Mowry (born March 27, 1960, near Starkville, Mississippi) is an American author of books and stories for children and young adults. He has written eighteen books and many short stories for and about black children and teens in a variety of genres, ranging from inner-city settings to the forests of Haiti. Many of the novels are set in Oakland, California (USA), and deal with contemporary themes such as crack cocaine, drug dealers, teenage sexuality, school dropouts, and coming-of-age.

== Early life ==
Jess Mowry was born to an African-American father, and a Caucasian mother. When he was only a few months old, his mother abandoned him, though this may have been understandable since Mississippi law at that time forbade interracial marriage. His father took Jess to Oakland, California, where he supported himself and his son by working as a crane operator, truck driver, and scrap-metal salvager. Jess's father was a voracious reader who introduced his son to books at a very early age. Jess Mowry attended a public school, but despite his love of reading, was not an above-average student. He dropped out of school at age thirteen, part way through the eighth grade. After leaving school, Mowry worked with his father in the scrap-iron business and, in his late teens, moved to Arizona to work as a truck driver and heavy equipment operator. He also lived and worked in Alaska as an engineer aboard a tugboat and as an aircraft mechanic on Douglas C-47 cargo planes.

== Life as an author ==
Returning to Oakland in the early 1980s, Mowry began working with kids at a youth center, reading to them and often making up stories because there were very few books to which inner-city youth could relate. Later, he began to write the stories. In 1988, Mowry sent one of his stories to Howard Junker, editor of Zyzzyva magazine in San Francisco. Junker rejected the tale but asked to see more work, and published the second story Jess sent. Mowry bought a 1923 Underwood typewriter for eight dollars, and within a year, his work was appearing in literary magazines in the United States and abroad.

In 1990, Mowry's first collection of stories, Rats in the Trees, won a PEN Oakland/Josephine Miles Literary Award and was also published in the United Kingdom, Germany, and Japan. In 1991, Mowry's first novel, Children of the Night, was published by Holloway House in Los Angeles. In 1992, his second novel, Way Past Cool, was published by Farrar, Straus & Giroux of New York. Way Past Cool was also published in the United Kingdom, Italy, France, Germany, the Netherlands, Sweden, Denmark, Finland, and Japan. It was optioned for a film, for which Mowry co-wrote the screenplay. The film, under the same title, was produced by Redeemable Features in 2000 with director Adam Davidson and executive producers Norman Lear and Miloš Forman. Other novels followed, including Six Out Seven, Babylon Boyz, Bones Become Flowers, Skeleton Key, Phat Acceptance, and When All Goes Bright.

Mowry's characters and settings range from gun-toting gang kids in Oakland and Voodoo apprentices in New Orleans' French Quarter, to teenage airplane pilots and child soldiers in Africa. As Mowry's puts it: "Almost all my stories and books are for and about Black kids who are not always cute and cuddly. My characters often spit, sweat, and swear, as well as occasionally smoke or drink. Just like their real-world counterparts, some are overweight, may look too Black, or are otherwise unacceptable by superficial [mainstream] American values. Like on-the-real kids, they often live in dirty and violent environments, and are forced into sometimes unpleasant lifestyles."

Jess Mowry emerged during the mid-1990s as one of America's new Black writers.

Jess Mowry lives in Oakland.

== Bibliography ==
=== Novels ===
- Children of the Night (Holloway House, 1991 - Anubis, 2012) is set in Oakland, California in the late 1980s; the first wave of the U.S. crack epidemic.
- Way Past Cool (Farrar, Straus & Giroux, 1992 - Harper, 1994 - Windstorm Creative, 2006 - Anubis, 2012) is set in Oakland, California: about young African-American teens trying to survive and make the right choices in a world of gangs, guns, drugs and violence.
- Six Out Seven (Farrar, Straus & Giroux, 1993 - Anchor/Doubleday, 1994 - Anubis 2012) After 13-year-old Corbitt Wainwright's father is imprisoned for attacking a white man in Mississippi, the boy sets out for Oakland, California—and a world even bleaker than the one he left behind.
- Ghost Train (Henry Holt & Co. 1995 - Anubis, 2011) is set in Oakland, California. Two young teens attempt to solve a murder that took place on a train fifty years in the past.
- Babylon Boyz (Simon & Schuster, 1996 - Anubis, 2012) is set in Oakland, California. Two young teens, Pook and Dante, see Air Touch, a drug dealer, throw a package out of his car window during a police chase. Hoping that the case holds money that will finally give them choices, they take it only to find that the package is filled with pure cocaine.
- Bones Become Flowers (Windstorm Creative, 2000 - Anubis, 2011) is set in Haiti. An African-American woman travels to Haiti to fund a children's refuge but becomes enmeshed in a web of Voodoo and mystery.
- Skeleton Key (Windstorm Creative, 2007 - Anubis, 2011) is set in Oakland, California. A young teen boy flees a drug dealer and hides out in a graveyard.
- Phat Acceptance (Windstorm Creative, 2007, ISBN 978-1-590-92267-5 - Anubis, 2011,ISBN 978-0-9985579-2-2) is set in Santa Cruz, California and explores the so-called childhood obesity epidemic; its commercial hype, self-serving junk science, and health-Nazi hysteria though the eyes of its multiracial teen characters.
- Tyger Tales (Anubis, 2011, ISBN 978-1547273225) is set in Oakland and San Francisco, California, a novel about child-exploitation, kiddie porn, and internet predators.
- Voodoo Dawgz (Anubis, 2011, ISBN 978-0998076775) is set in New Orleans, Louisiana: a group of young teens fight both supernatural and real-world evil using Voodoo magic.
- The Bridge (Anubis, 2011, ISBN 978-0-9980767-5-1) is set in Oakland, California and the Sacramento River Delta. 13-year-old Bilal was raised as a Muslim but is questioning his faith. Having fallen victim to gang violence in Oakland, he is sent to live with cousins in a small rural town where he encounters some of the worst but much of the best of traditional American values.
- Knight's Crossing (Anubis, 2011) is set in Louisiana in the months before the American Civil War, about slavery.
- When All Goes Bright (Anubis, 2011, ISBN 978-0-9980767-9-9) is set in Africa; about child-soldiers, sweat-shops, and modern-day imperialism.
- Midnight Sons (Anubis, 2012) is set in Alaska. A multi-racial group of renegade ecologists fight a corporate scheme to dump toxic waste.
- Drawing From Life (Anubis, 2013, ISBN 978-0-9985579-0-8) is set in Oakland, California. Two teachers and a junior-high student investigate dangerous paranormal incidents in a reputedly haunted Victorian mansion.
- Magic Rats (Anubis, 2014, ISBN 978-1547298471) is set in the Arizona desert. A boy suspects that a seemingly nice middle-aged couple, his new next-door neighbors, are concealing a kidnapped child in their house.
- Double Acting (Anubis, 2015, ISBN 978-0-9985579-1-5) is set in the Arizona desert. Three boys resurrect a steam locomotive and solve a hundred-year-old mystery.
- Ghost Ship (Anubis, 2016, ISBN 978-0-9980767-6-8) is set in the Caribbean. A Haitian boy and his four friends at sea at night in a small boat discover an abandoned cargo steamer apparently adrift for a hundred years.
- Spencer's Spirit (Anubis, 2020, ISBN 978-0-578-63424-1) is set in Oakland, California. 13-year-old Spencer Dray and his parents move from their West Oakland, California bungalow to a cottage in the Oakland hills next to a deserted and reputedly haunted mansion.
- The Insiders (Anubis, 2024, ISBN 9780578285412) is set in Los Angeles and Oakland, California in the near future. About a world slowly coming together in peace in the midst of ongoing climate change, yet in the U.S.A. there is a new-age form of slavery.
- The Light (Anubis, 2025, ISBN 979-8-218-58185-5) is set in Ravensport, Massachusetts. The 13-year-old son of a lighthouse keeper encounters the ghost of a boy who was drowned in a shipwreck in 1824.

=== Stories ===
==== Collections ====
- Rats in the Trees (John Daniel & Co. 1990, Anubis 2020) ISBN 978-0-9985579-5-3
- Reaps (Anubis 2011) ISBN 978-0-9985579-9-1

==== In magazines ====
- "Big Bird" (Obsidian II, summer 1990)
- "Big Bird" (Berkeley Fiction Review, Number 13, 1993)
- "Crusader Rabbit" (Zyzzyva, winter, 1990)
- "Crusader Rabbit" (Los Angeles Times Magazine, 1991)
- "Crusader Rabbit" (Shooting Star Review, winter 1991/92)
- "Der Neue" (Bateria, 1992)
- "Don't Be Cool" (Obsidian II, spring, 1991)
- "Enfant Perdu" (Zyzzyva, fall 1997)
- "One Way" (Zyzzyva, winter, 1988)
- "One Way" (Barcelona Review, May/June, 2000)
- "Perv" (Alchemy, 1989)
- "The Ship" (Sequoia, summer 1989)
- "Third-World Wolf" (Obsidian II, fall-winter, 1998)

==== In anthologies ====
- "Animal Rights" (In The Tradition, Harlem River Press, 1992)
- "Animal Rights" (Listening To Ourselves, Anchor Books - Doubleday, 1994)
- "Child of All Ages" (Black Short Fiction, Alexander Street Press, 2004)
- "Crusader Rabbit" (Cornerstones, St. Martin's Press, 1996)
- "Crusader Rabbit" (The Penguin Book Of The City, Penguin Books, 1997)
- "Crusader Rabbit" (Follow That Dream, 1998, European Educational Publishers Group)
- "Crusader Rabbit" (Free Within Ourselves, Doubleday, 1999)
- "Crusader Rabbit" ("Echo Short Stories," Natur & Kultur, Denmark, 2014)
- "Dreamtime Story" (Black Short Fiction, Alexander Street Press, 2004)
- "Esu's Island" (I Believe In Water, Harper-Collins, 2000)
- "One Way" (The Pushcart Prize 1991/92, Pushcart Press, 1991)
- "One Way" (California Shorts, Heyday Books, 1999)
- "Phat Acceptance" (Face Relations, Simon & Schuster, 2004)
- "Spontaneous Combustion" (Black Short Fiction, Alexander Street Press, 2004)
- "The Execution" (Black Short Fiction, Alexander Street Press, 2004)
- "The Picture" (Black Short Fiction, Alexander Street Press, 2004)
- "The Resurrection" (Make Me Over, Dutton, 2005)
- "Way Past Cool" excerpt" ("Brotherman", Ballantine, 1995)

=== Articles and essays ===
- "Symposium - Does Brown Still Matter?" (The Nation, May 23, 1994)
- "Stupid Rejection Letters to a Black Author" (Voice of Youth Advocates, December, 1997)
- "Wake Up, America, There are Gangs under Your Beds" (Shiny Adidas, Tracksuits, And The Death Of Camp - Might Magazine, Berkeley, 1998)
- "We Have Met the Enemy and He Is U.S." (September 11; West Coast Writers Approach Ground Zero, Hawthorne, 2002)
- "Locker Notes" (Bullett, Spring 2011)

=== Anthologies ===
- "In The Dead Of Night" (Anubis, 2015) Thirteen classic ghost stories,

=== Book reviews ===
- "Your Black Muslim History" Review of Thomas Peele's "Killing The Messenger" for the Columbia Journalism Review, March/April, 2012
- "A Runaway Tale" Review of Russell Banks' "Rule Of The Bone" for The Nation, June 12, 1995
