= God Bless the Child (picture book) =

2003 book by Jerry Pinkney

- Author: Billie Holiday, Arthur Herzog Jr.
- Illustrator: Jerry Pinkney
- Language: English
- Genre: Children's literature, picture book, Song
- Published: 2003 (HarperCollins)
- Publication place: USA
- Media type: Print (hardback)
- Pages: 32 (unpaginated)
- ISBN: 9780060287979
- OCLC: 45230462
- Includes cd of song by Billie Holiday and Arthur Herzog Jr.

God Bless the Child is a 2003 picture book by Jerry Pinkney with the words and music of Billie Holiday and Arthur Herzog Jr. It is about an African-American family moving from the rural Deep South to urban Chicago during the Great Migration.

== Reception ==
School Library Journal (SLJ), in a review of God Bless the Child, called it "A moving visual interpretation", wrote "The warm and sweeping illustrations are masterful, completely filling each spread. .. While a fine choice for independent reading, this title is particularly poignant when shared with a group, turning the pages in conjunction with the CD.", and concluded "This offering makes an excellent tie-in to units on African-American history." SLJ also recommended it "to enrich music classes".

God Bless the Child has also been reviewed by The Horn Book Magazine, Booklist, Publishers Weekly, Kirkus Reviews,

It was awarded a 2005 Coretta Scott King Award illustrator honor.
