= Sonia Levitin =

German–American novelist producer artist

- Born: August 18, 1934 (age 92); Berlin, Nazi Germany
- Education: University of California, Berkeley; University of Pennsylvania
- Occupations: Novelist; artist; producer
- Spouse: Lloyd Levitin
- Website: sonialevitin.com

Sonia Wolff Levitin (born August 18, 1934) is a German-American novelist, artist, and producer. Levitin, a Holocaust survivor, has written over forty novels and picture books for young adults and children, as well as several theatrical plays and published essays on various topics for adults.

Her book Incident at Loring Groves (1988) won an Edgar Allan Poe Award.

== Early life ==
Sonia Levitin was born on August 18, 1934, in Berlin, Nazi Germany. Being of Jewish descent, she managed to escape persecution by traveling with her mother and two sisters to Switzerland. Her father, a prominent clothing designer, escaped to New York City and then to Los Angeles where he would raise Sonia and her sisters. Levitin would later write several novels about struggling as an immigrant in the United States; these include: The Journey to America and Silver Days, a series about a family of German Jewish refugees who flee the horrors of the Holocaust.

Always an avid reader, Levitin attended the University of California, Berkeley in 1952 where she would meet her husband, Lloyd Levitin. The two married after one year. She then completed a degree in education from the University of Pennsylvania.

== Career ==
Levitin began as a publicity columnist for several newspapers, but after her first novel Journey to America became an instant classic, she began to pick up traction as a professional novelist. Levitin wrote numerous novels for young adults that oftentimes featured semi-autobiographical characters. The most common theme of her writing include courageous main characters faced with difficult challenges, who must "take charge" in order to overcome these obstacles. Her books often describe historical events and tragedies, especially toward Jewish people.

=== Painter ===
Levitin is also noted as being a talented painter. Her artwork was displayed in June 2015 for the first time to the public. And the inaugural art show, which was curated by Los Angeles event producer Anthony Angelini, took place at Christofle on Melrose Place in Beverly Hills, CA and was attended by several of the Los Angeles elite. The show featured 10 of Levitin's expressionist paintings which were never-before-seen in the public arena.

== Books ==
- Adam's War
- All the Cats in the World
- Annie's Promise
- Beyond Another Door
- Boom Town
- Clem's Chances
- The Cure
- Dream Freedom
- Escape from Egypt
- Evil Encounter
- The Fisherman and the Bird (written with Francis Livingston)
- The Golem and the Dragon Girl
- The Goodness Gene
- Incident at Loring Groves
- Jason and the Money Tree
- Journey to America
- The Man Who Kept His Heart in a Bucket
- The Mark of Conte
- Nine for California
- Nobody Stole the Pie
- The No-Return Trail
- A Piece of Home
- Reigning Cats and Dogs
- The Return
- Rita, the Weekend Rat
- Roanoke: A Novel of the Lost Colony
- Room in the Heart
- A Season for Unicorns
- Silver Days
- The Singing Mountain
- A Single Speckled Egg
- Smile Like a Plastic Daisy
- A Sound to Remember
- Strange Relations
- Taking Charge
- Who Owns the Moon?
- The Year of Sweet Senior Insanity
- Yesterday's Child

== Awards ==
Levitin has won several awards for her writing including:

- Edgar Allan Poe Award
- 1971: National Jewish Book Award for Journey to America
- 1988: National Jewish Book Award for The Return
- Association of Jewish Libraries Sydney Taylor Award
- Jewish Book Council Best Juvenile Fiction
- American Library Association Best Book for Young Adults
- Southern California Council on Literature for Children and Young People, Distinguished Body of Work Award
- German Bishops’ Conference, Children’s Book Prize
- PEN Los Angeles Award for Young Adult fiction
