= Rikki-Tikki-Tavi (picture book) =

Book by Rudyard Kipling

- Author: Rudyard Kipling
- Illustrator: Jerry Pinkney
- Language: English
- Genre: Children's literature, picture book, Indian folktales
- Published: 1997 (Morrow Junior Books)
- Publication place: USA
- Media type: Print (hardback)
- Pages: 40 (unpaginated)
- ISBN: 9780688143206
- OCLC: 36017251

Rikki-Tikki-Tavi is a 1997 retelling of Rudyard Kipling's classic story by Jerry Pinkney about a mongoose that protects a family from two cobras. The book won a Caldecott honor in 1998 for its illustrations.

== Reception ==
A review of Rikki-Tikki-Tavi by Booklist wrote: "Just as recent picture books have brought the Just So Stories to a new generation of children, this lovely edition has the inimitable language and visual appeal to intrigue a somewhat older group of readers or listeners". School Library Journal wrote: "In this glorious picture book, Pinkney's accessible retelling and dramatic watercolors plunge readers into the lush garden Rikki rules and the life of the family he comes to guard. .. This great story has been given the loving treatment it deserves".

Rikki-Tikki-Tavi has also been reviewed by Publishers Weekly, Kirkus Reviews, and The Horn Book Magazine.

The book was named in a "1997 Capital Choices Noteworthy Book for Children and Teens", and a "1997 CCBC Choice".
