= Jerry Pinkney =

American author and illustrator (1939–2021)

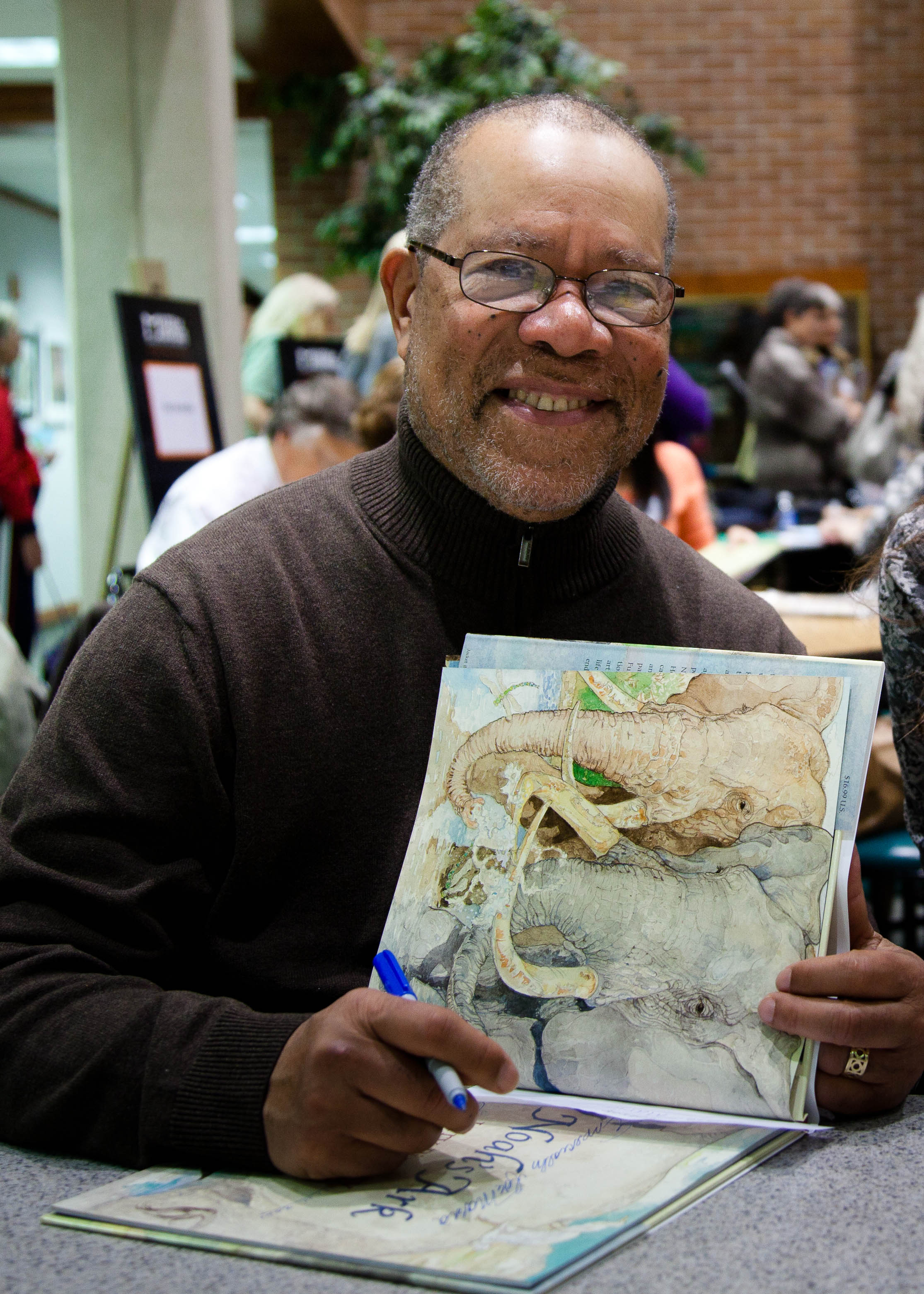
- Pinkney at the Mazza Museum in 2011
- Born: December 22, 1939; Philadelphia, Pennsylvania, U.S.
- Died: October 20, 2021 (aged 81); Sleepy Hollow, New York, U.S.
- Occupations: Illustrator, writer
- Spouse: Gloria Jean
- Children: 4, including Brian
- Writing career
- Period: 1964–2021
- Genre: Children's picture books
- Notable awards: Caldecott Medal (2010)

Jerry Pinkney (December 22, 1939 – October 20, 2021) was an American illustrator and writer of children's literature. Pinkney illustrated over 100 books since 1964, including picture books, nonfiction titles and novels. Pinkney's works addressed diverse themes and were usually done in watercolors.

In 1994, Pinkney obtained the Boston Globe–Horn Book Award for the book John Henry and he has received five Coretta Scott King Awards for illustration. In 2010, he received the Caldecott Medal for his book The Lion & the Mouse. His book A Place to Land: Martin Luther King Jr. and the Speech that Inspired a Nation (2019), illustrated by Pinkney and written by Barry Wittenstein, won the Orbis Pictus Award for 2020.

In 2000, Pinkney received the Virginia Hamilton Literary Award from Kent State University, and, in 2004, he was awarded the University of Southern Mississippi Medallion for outstanding contributions in the field of children's literature. In 2016, Pinkney received the Coretta Scott King - Virginia Hamilton Award for Lifetime Achievement.

Pinkney has partnered with the United States Postal Service, National Park Service, and National Geographic for his illustration work. His art has also been featured in numerous exhibitions.

== Biography ==
=== Early life ===
Pinkney was born in Philadelphia on December 22, 1939, to Williemae and James Pinkney. Pinkney was the middle child in a family of five siblings. Pinkney struggled in school due to dyslexia, but excelled at drawing, even at the young age of 4. During Pinkney's youth, his mother encouraged him to develop his skills by enrolling him in art classes, but Pinkney's father did not consider art a sustainable career until Pinkney grew older.

=== Career ===
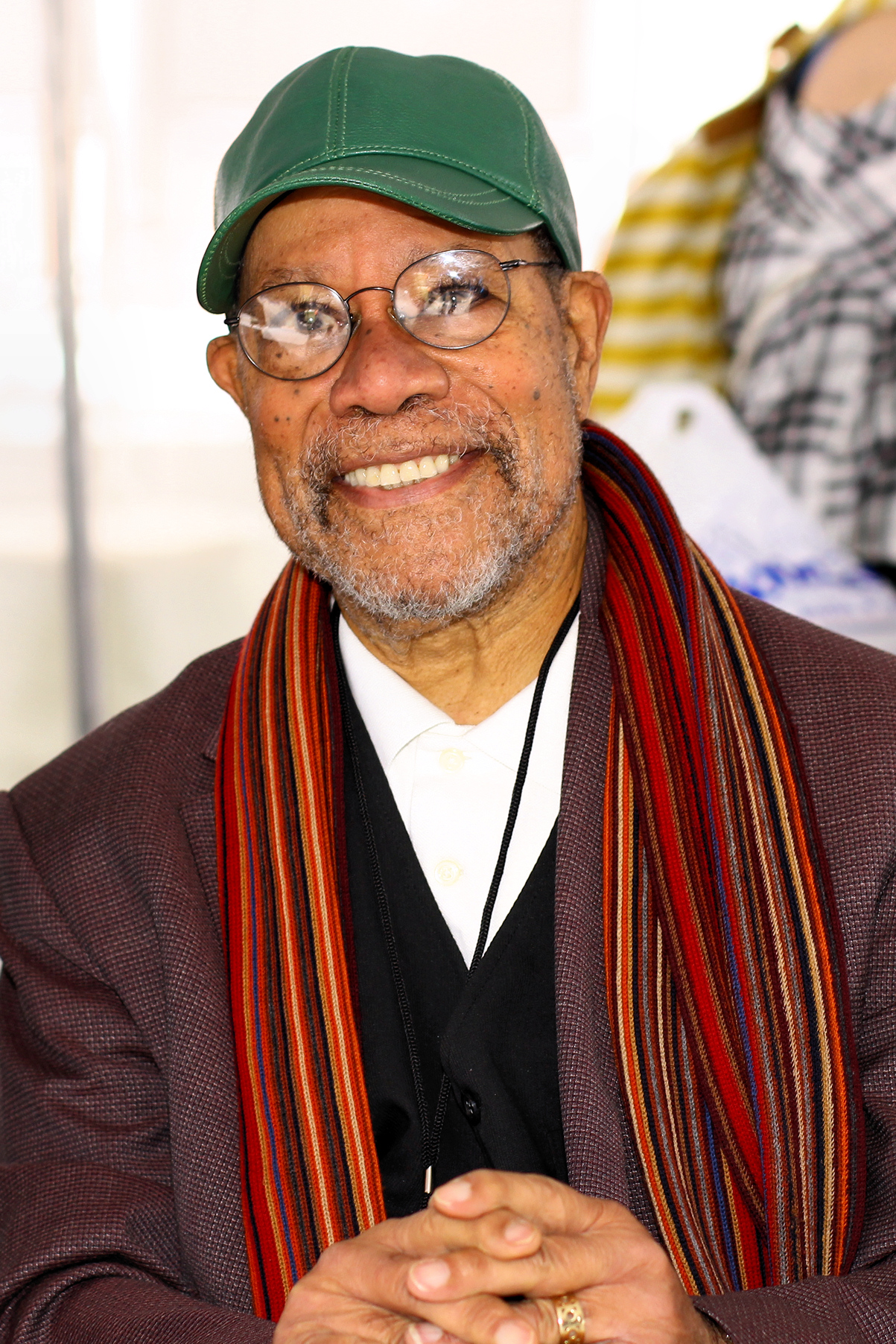
Pinkney at the 2019 Texas Book Festival

During his early teens, Pinkney worked at a local newspaper stand, where he would pass the time by drawing city life. Pinkney's talent caught the eye of customer and cartoonist John Liney, who worked on the Henry comic strips. Liney showed Pinkney how artistry could be used for commercial purposes.

Pinkney attended the Murrell Dobbins Vocational High School for his secondary education and met his future wife, Gloria Jean Pinkney, during this time. Pinkney graduated from Murrell Dobbins in 1957 and was granted a full scholarship to the Philadelphia Museum College of Art (now University of the Arts). Pinkney only attended the Philadelphia College of Art for a few years, leaving to start a family with wife Gloria.

In 1960, Pinkney began working for The Rust Craft Greeting Card Company in Dedham, Massachusetts. Pinkney later worked at Barker-Black Studio, where he illustrated his first picture book in collaboration with Joyce Cooper Arkhurst called, The Adventures of Spider: West African Folk Tales (1964). He, along with two other artists, opened Kaleidoscope Studio a few years later. Pinkney opened his own freelance studio, Jerry Pinkney Studios, in 1968.

During the 1970s, Pinkney worked on the Black Heritage Stamp Series for the United States Postal Service. During the 1980s Pinkney began to receive additional recognition for his work, including a Coretta Scott King Award for his collaboration with author Patricia McKissack on Mirandy and Brother Wind (1989). Pinkney also collaborated with the National Geographic Magazine and the National Park Service on the topic of the Underground Railroad.

Pinkney also worked as an educator, teaching at colleges and universities like the University of Delaware, the Pratt Institute in Brooklyn, New York and the University at Buffalo, in Buffalo, New York.

Pinkney's work was included in the 2015 exhibition We Speak: Black Artists in Philadelphia, 1920s-1970s at the Woodmere Art Museum.

==== Professional memberships ====
- Pinkley became a member of the Society of Children's Book Writers and Illustrators in 1990. He was appointed to the National Council of the Arts by President George W. Bush in 2003. In 2012, he was elected to the American Academy of Arts and Sciences.

=== Personal life ===
Jerry Pinkney and Gloria Jean Pinkney have four children: Troy, Brian, Scott, and Myles. Brian Pinkney and his wife Andrea Davis Pinkney also write books for children. The other Pinkney children, including Jerry and Gloria Pinkney's six grandchildren, all participate in the arts, which Gloria calls a continuation of “the Pinkney tradition.”

Pinkney lived in Croton-on-Hudson in New York with his wife Gloria, where he worked out of his freelance studio, Jerry Pinkney Studio, since 1971.

Pinkney died of a heart attack on October 20, 2021, in Sleepy Hollow, New York, at the age of 81.

== Art style and themes ==
=== Art style ===
Pinkney got his start drawing in pencil and his early works were black and white productions. Pinkney used a combination of watercolors and pencils for the majority of his work, along with other materials, such as, "pastel[s], color pencils, and Cray-Pas". In an interview, he stated watercolors are his "medium of choice." Pinkney's "intricate detail" is considered "rare" for a person who uses watercolors.

=== Themes ===
Pinkney researched the subjects of his works for accuracy, such as the dress of the characters involved and the time periods. Pinkney also used live models for establishing character poses. Pinkney has stated he liked to draw animals the most and to give these characters human features.

Many of Pinkney's titles are on diverse themes and topics, such as African American history, and Pinkney has stated his stories are a way for him to "revisit" his childhood. His recent book, A Place to Land: Martin Luther King Jr and the Speech That Inspired a Nation (2019), portrays Martin Luther King Jr.'s 1963 March on Washington "I Have A Dream" speech.

A number of Pinkney's works retell Aesop Fables, such as The Grasshopper & The Ants (2015) and The Lion and the Mouse (2009).

== Literary works ==
=== Children's books ===
- 1965–1969
  - Arkhurst, Joyce Cooper. The Adventures of Spider: West African Folk Tales. Illustrated by Jerry Pinkney. New York: Scholastic, 1964.
  - Fletcher, Helen Jill. The Year Around Book. Illustrated by Jerry Pinkney. New York: McGraw-Hill, 1965.
  - McCall, Adeline. This is Music for Kindergarten and Nursery School. Illustrated by Jerry Pinkney. Boston: Allyn and Bacon, 1965.
  - Garshin, V. M. The Traveling Frog. Illustrated by Jerry Pinkney. Translated by Marguerita Rudolph. New York: McGraw-Hill, 1966.
  - Sobol, Ken. A Book of Sizes & Shapes. Illustrated by Jerry Pinkney. New York: McGraw-Hill, 1966.
  - Saleh, Harold J. Even Tiny Ants Must Sleep. Pictures by Jerry Pinkney. New York: McGraw-Hill, 1967.
  - Sobol, Ken. The Clock Museum. Illustrated by Jerry Pinkney. New York: McGraw-Hill, 1967.
  - Spellman, John W. The Beautiful Blue Jay, and Other Tales of India. Illustrated by Jerry Pinkney. Boston: Little, Brown, 1967.
  - Dale, Ralph Alan. Shoes, Pennies and Rockets: A Book of Singing Games. Illustrated by Jerry Pinkney. New York: L. W. Singer, 1968.
  - Green, Lila. Folktales and Fairytales of Africa. Illustrated by Jerry Pinkney. Morristown: Silver Burdett, 1968.
  - Traudl. Kostas the Rooster. Illustrated by Jerry Pinkney. New York: Lothrop, Lee & Shepard Co., 1968.
  - Phillips, Irv. The Twin Witches of Fingle Fu. Illustrated by Jerry Pinkney. New York: L. W. Singer, 1969.
  - Powell, Fern. The Porcupine and the Tiger. Illustrated by Jerry Pinkney. New York: Lothrop, Lee & Sheppard Co., 1969.
  - Shaw, Thelma. Juano and the Wonderful Fresh Fish. Illustrated by Jerry Pinkney. Reading: Addison-Wesley, 1969.
  - Trofimuk, Ann. Babushka and the Pig . Illustrated by Jerry Pinkney. Boston: Houghton Mifflin, 1969.
- 1970–1979
  - Annett, Cora. Cora Annett's Homerhenry. Illustrated by Jerry Pinkney. Reading: Addison-Wesley, 1970.
  - Jacobs, Francine. The King's Ditch: A Hawaiian Tale. Illustrated by Jerry Pinkney. New York: Coward, McCann, & Geoghegan, 1971.
  - Arkhurst, Joyce Cooper. More Adventures of Spider: West African Folk Tales. New York: Scholastic Book Services, 1972.
  - Robinson, Adjai. Femi and Old Grandaddie. Illustrated by Jerry Pinkney. New York: Coward, McCann & Geoghegan, 1972.
  - Evans, Mari. JD. Illustrated by Jerry Pinkney. Garden City: Doubleday, 1973.
  - Freschet, Berniece. Prince Littlefoot. Illustrated by Jerry Pinkney. Lexington: Ginn, 1973.
  - Robinson, Adjai. Kasho and the Twin Flutes. Illustrated by Jerry Pinkney. New York: Coward, McCann & Geoghegan, 1973.
  - Mickey and Minny. Illustrated by Jerry Pinkney. N.p.: Houghton Mifflin, 1973.
  - Jefferson, Margo and Elliott P. Skinner. Roots of Time: A Portrait of African Life and Culture. Garden City: Doubleday, 1974.
  - Wilson, Beth P. The Great Minu. Illustrated by Jerry Pinkney. Chicago: Follett, 1974.
  - Martel, Cruz. Yagua Days. Illustrated by Jerry Pinkney. New York: Dial Press, 1975.
  - Taylor, Mildred. Song of the Trees. Illustrated by Jerry Pinkney. New York: Dial Press, [1975] 1996.
  - Greenfield, Eloise. Mary McLeod Bethune. Illustrated by Jerry Pinkney. New York: Crowell, 1977.
  - Aaderma, Verna. Ji-nongo-nongo Means Riddles. Illustrated by Jerry Pinkney. New York: Four Winds Press, 1978.
  - Green, Lila. Tales From Africa. Illustrated by Jerry Pinkney. Morristown: Silver Burdett Co., 1979.
  - Greenfield, Eloise, Lessie Jones Little, and Pattie Ridley Jones. Childtimes: A Three-Generation Memoir. Drawings by Jerry Pinkney. New York: Crowell, 1979.
  - Yellow Robe, Rosebud. Tonweya and the Eagles and Other Lakota Indian Tales. Pictures by Jerry Pinkney. New York: Dial Press, 1979.
- 1980–1989
  - Hamilton, Virginia. Jahdu. Pictures by Jerry Pinkney. New York: Greenwillow Books, 1980.
  - Zaslavsky, Claudia. Count on Your Fingers African Style. Illustrated by Jerry Pinkney. New York: Crowell, 1980.
  - Wise, William. Monster Myths of Ancient Greece. Illustrated by Jerry Pinkney. New York: Putnam, 1981.
  - Michels, Barbara and Bettye White, eds. Apples on a Stick: The Folklore of Black Children. Illustrated by Jerry Pinkney. New York: Coward-McCann, 1983.
  - Flournoy, Valerie. The Patchwork Quilt. Pictures by Jerry Pinkney. New York: Dial, 1985.
  - Dragonwagon, Crescent. Half a Moon and One Whole Star. Illustrated by Jerry Pinkney. New York:Macmillan Publishing Company, 1986.
  - Buxton, Jane Heath, John Strejan, and James Diaz. Strange Animals of the Sea. Illustrated by Jerry Pinkney. Washington D.C.: National Geographic Society, 1987.
  - Carlstrom, Nancy White. Wild Wild Sunflower Child Anna. Illustrated by Jerry Pinkney. New York: Macmillan Publishing Co., 1987.
  - Lester, Julius. The Tales of Uncle Remus: The Adventures of Brer Rabbit. Illustrated by Jerry Pinkney. New York: Dial Books, 1987.
  - Lester, Julius. More Tales of Uncle Remus: Further Adventures of Brer Rabbit, His Friends, Enemies and Others. Illustrated by Jerry Pinkney. New York: Dial Books, 1987.
  - Fields, Julia. The Green Lion of Zion Street. Illustrated by Jerry Pinkney. New York: McElderry Books, 1988.
  - McKissack, Patricia C. Mirandy and Brother Wind. Illustrated by Jerry Pinkney. New York: Knopf, 1988.
  - Aardema, Verna. Rabbit Makes a Monkey of Lion: A Swahili Tale. Pictures by Jerry Pinkney. New York: Dial Books for Young Readers, 1989.
  - San Souci, Robert D. The Talking Eggs: A Folktale From the American South. Pictures by Jerry Pinkney. New York: Dial Books for Young Readers, 1989.
  - Singer, Marilyn. Turtle in July. Illustrated by Jerry Pinkney. New York: Macmillan Publishing Co., 1989.
- 1990–1999
  - Dragonwagon, Crescent. Home Place. Illustrated by Jerry Pinkney. New York: Macmillan Publishing Company, 1990.
  - Lester, Julius. Further Tales of Uncle Remus: The Misadventures of Brer Rabbit, Brer Fox, Brer Wolf, the Doodang and Other Creatures. Illustrated by Jerry Pinkney. New York: Dial Books, 1990.
  - Marzollo, Jean. Pretend You're a Cat. Illustrated by Jerry Pinkney. New York: Dial Books for Young Readers, 1990.
  - Adoff, Arnold. In for Winter, Out for Spring. Illustrated by Jerry Pinkney. San Diego: Harcourt Brace Jovanovich, 1991.
  - Levitin, Sonia. The Man Who Kept His Heart in a Bucket. Pictures by Jerry Pinkney. New York: Dial Books for Young Readers, 1991.
  - Eisler, Colin T., ed. David's Songs: His Psalms and Their Story. Illustrated by Jerry Pinkney. New York: Dial Books, 1992.
  - Hamilton, Virginia. Drylongso. Illustrated by Jerry Pinkney. San Diego: Harcourt Brace Jovanovich, 1992.
  - Pinkney, Gloria Jean. Back Home. Illustrated by Jerry Pinkney. New York: Dial Books for Young Readers, 1992.
  - Hurwitz, Johanna. New Shoes for Silvia. Illustrated by Jerry Pinkney. New York: Morrow Junior Books, 1993.
  - Moss, Thylias. I Want To Be. Pictures by Jerry Pinkney. New York: Dial Books for Young Readers, 1993.
  - Willard, Nancy. A Starlit Somersault Downhill. Illustrated by Jerry Pinkney. Boston; Toronto; London: Little, Brown, and Company, 1993.
  - Lester, Julius. John Henry. Pictures by Jerry Pinkney. New York: Dial Books, 1994.
  - Lester, Julius. The Last Tales of Uncle Remus. Illustrated by Jerry Pinkney. New York: Dial, 1994.
  - Pinkney, Gloria Jean. The Sunday Outing. Pictures by Jerry Pinkney. New York: Dial Books for Young Readers, 1994.
  - Flournoy, Valerie. Tanya's Reunion. Pictures by Jerry Pinkney. New York: Dial Books for Young Readers, 1995.
  - Schroeder, Alan. Minty: A Story of Young Harriet Tubman. Pictures by Jerry Pinkney. New York: Dial Books for Young Readers, 1996.
  - Lester, Julius. Sam and the Tigers: A New Telling of Little Black Sambo. Pictures by Jerry Pinkney. New York: Dial Books for Young Readers, 1996.
  - Kipling, Rudyard. Rikki-Tikki-Tavi. Illustrated by Jerry Pinkney. New York: Morrow Junior Books, 1997.
  - San Souci, Robert D. The Hired Hand: An African-American Folktale. Pictures by Jerry Pinkney. New York: Dial Books for Young Readers, 1997.
  - Lester, Julius. Black Cowboy, Wild Horses: A True Story. Pictures by Jerry Pinkney. New York: Dial Books, 1998.
  - Andersen, Hans Christian. The Little Match Girl. Adapted and illustrated by Jerry Pinkney. New York: Dial Books for Young Readers, 1999.
  - Andersen, Hans Christian. The Ugly Duckling. Adapted and illustrated by Jerry Pinkney. New York: Morrow Junior Books, 1999.
  - Goldin, Barbara Diamond. Journeys With Elijah: Eight Tales of the Prophet. Paintings by Jerry Pinkney. San Diego: Harcourt Brace, 1999.
  - Lester, Julius. Uncle Remus: The Complete Tales. Illustrated by Jerry Pinkney. New York: Phyllis Fogelman Books, 1999.
- 2000–2009
  - Lester, Julius and Jerry Pinkney. Albidaro and the Mischievous Dream. New York: Phyllis Fogelman Books, 2000.
  - Pinkney, Jerry. Aesop's Fables. New York: SeaStar Books, 2000.
  - McKissack, Patricia C. and Jerry Pinkney. Goin' Someplace Special. New York: Atheneum Books for Young Readers, 2001.
  - Andersen, Hans Christian. The Nightingale. Adapted and illustrated by Jerry Pinkney. New York: Dial Books for Young Readers, 2002.
  - Pinkney, Jerry. Noah's Ark. New York: SeaStar Books, 2002.
  - Holiday, Billie and Arthur Herzog Jr. God Bless the Child. Illustrated by Jerry Pinkney. New York:HarperCollins/Amistad, 2004.
  - Pinkney, Jerry. The Little Red Hen. New York: Dial Books for Young Readers, 2006.
  - Lester, Julius. The Old African. Illustrated by Jerry Pinkney. New York: Dial Books, 2005.
  - Grifalconi, Ann. Ain't Nobody a Stranger to Me. Illustrated by Jerry Pinkney. New York: Jump at the Sun: Hyperion Books for Children, 2007.
  - McKissack, Patricia C. The All-I'll-Ever-Want Christmas Doll. Illustrated by Jerry Pinkney. New York: Schwartz & Wade Books, 2007.
  - Pinkney, Jerry. Little Red Riding Hood. New York: Little, Brown, 2007.
  - Aston, Dianna Hutts. The Moon Over Star. Pictures by Jerry Pinkney. New York: Dial Books for Young Readers, 2008.
  - Nelson, Marilyn. Sweethearts of Rhythm: The Story of the Greatest All-Girl Swing Band in the World. Illustrated by Jerry Pinkney. New York: Dial Books, 2009.
  - Pinkney, Jerry. The Lion and the Mouse. New York: Little, Brown, and Co. Books for Young Readers, 2009. ‡
  - ‡ This title was also issued with a CD comprising sound tracks, an author's note, and interview in 2010.
- 2010–2019
  - Pinkney, Jerry. Three Little Kittens. New York: Dial Books for Young Readers, 2010.
  - Taylor, Jane. Twinkle, Twinkle, Little Star. Illustrated by Jerry Pinkney. New York: Little, Brown, 2011.
  - Pinkney, Jerry. Puss in Boots. New York: Dial Books for Young Readers, 2012.
  - Pinkney, Jerry. The Tortoise & The Hare. New York: Little, Brown, and Company, 2013.
  - Pinkney, Jerry. The Grasshopper & The Ants. New York: Little, Brown, and Company, 2015.
  - Jackson, Richard. In Plain Sight. Illustrated by Jerry Pinkney. New York: Roaring Brook Press, 2016.
  - Wheeler, Lisa. The Christmas Boot. Illustrated by Jerry Pinkney. New York: Dial Books for Young Readers, 2016.
  - Pinkney, Jerry. The Three Billy Goats Gruff. New York: Little, Brown, and Company, 2017.
  - Brown, Margaret Wise. A Home in the Barn. Pictures by Jerry Pinkney. New York: Harper, an imprint of HarperCollins Publishers, 2018.
  - Wittenstein, Barry. A Place to Land: Martin Luther King Jr and the Speech That Inspired a Nation. Illustrated by Jerry Pinkney. New York: Holiday House, 2019.
- 2020-2021
  - Pinkney, Jerry. The Little Mermaid. New York, Little, Brown Books for Young Readers, 2020.
  - Wells, Rosemary. The Welcome Chair. Illustrated by Jerry Pinkney. New York, Simon and Schuster, 2021.

=== Illustrated novels ===
- 1970–1979
  - Brontë, Emily. Wuthering Heights. Illustrated by Jerry Pinkney. Pennsylvania: Franklin Library, 1975.
  - Auchincloss, Louis. The Winthrop Covenant. Illustrated by Jerry Pinkney. Pennsylvania: Franklin Library, 1976.
  - Bromfield, Louis. Early Autumn. Illustrated by Jerome Pinkney. Pennsylvania: Franklin Library, [1927] 1977.
  - Swift, Jonathan. Gulliver's Travels. Illustrated by Jerry Pinkney. Pennsylvania: Franklin Library, 1977.
  - Updike, John. Rabbit, Run. Illustrated by Jerry Pinkney. Pennsylvania: Franklin Library, 1977.
  - Williams, Tennessee. Selected Plays. Illustrated by Jerry Pinkney. Pennsylvania: Franklin Library, 1977.
  - Fielding, Henry. The History of Tom Jones, A Foundling. Illustrated by Jerry Pinkney. Pennsylvania: Franklin Library, 1978.
  - Brooks, Van Wyck. The Flowering of New England, 1815–1865. Illustrated by Jerry Pinkney. Pennsylvania: Franklin Library, 1979.
  - Faulkner, William. These Thirteen. Illustrated by Jerry Pinkney. Pennsylvania: Franklin Library, [1931] 1979.
- 1980–1989
  - Michener, James A. The Covenant. Illustrated by Jerry Pinkney. Pennsylvania: Franklin Library, 1980.
  - Nabokov, Vladomir Vladimirovich. Lolita. Illustrated by Jerry Pinkney. Pennsylvania: Franklin Library, 1981.
  - Updike, John. Rabbit Redux. Illustrated by Jerry Pinkney. Pennsylvania: Franklin Library, 1981.
  - Adams, Henry. The Education of Henry Adams. Sketches by Jerry Pinkney. Pennsylvania: Franklin Library, [1918] 1982.
- 1990–1999
  - Hurston, Zora Neale. Their Eyes Were Watching God. Illustrated by Jerry Pinkney. Chicago: University of Illinois Press, 1991.
  - Kipling, Rudyard. The Jungle Book: The Mowgli Stories. Illustrated by Jerry Pinkney. New York: William Morrow, 1995.

=== Plays ===
- Building Bridges: The Life and Times of Jerry Pinkney. 2004.

=== Other contributions ===
- Created the cover illustration for Virginia Hamilton's The Planet of Junior Brown (New York: Simon & Schuster Books for Young Readers, 1971).
- Provided the illustrations for the RCA Corporation booklet Craftmanship, A Tradition in Black America (New York: RCA, 1976).
- Illustrated the book frontispiece for Mildred D. Taylor's novel Roll of Thunder, Hear My Cry (New York: Dial Press, 1977).
- Provided the illustrations for Charles L. Bronson's 1984 National Geographic Magazine article "Escape from Slavery: The Underground Railroad."
- Illustrated "Silent Lobby," a story written by Mildred Pitts Walter that appeared in The Big Book For Peace (New York: E. P. Dutton Children's Books, 1990).
- Illustrated portraits for the National Park Service's "The Underground Railroad Handbook" in 1997.
- Designed the White House Christmas brochure in 2001 on the theme Home for the Holidays.

== Awards and recognition ==
Pinkney has received many awards for his work as an illustrator over the years and has been recognized by multiple organizations for his contributions as an artist.

=== Awards ===
- Boston Globe-Horn Book Award
  - 1995, for Picture Book: Lester, Julius. John Henry. Pictures by Jerry Pinkney. New York: Dial Books, 1994.
- Boston Globe-Horn Honor Book
  - 1980, for Nonfiction: Greenfield, Eloise, Lessie Jones Little, and Pattie Ridley Jones. Childtimes: A Three-Generation Memoir. Drawings by Jerry Pinkney. New York: Crowell, 1979.
  - 2010, for Picture Book: Pinkney, Jerry. The Lion and the Mouse. New York: Little, Brown, and Co. Books for Young Readers, 2009.
- Caldecott Medal
  - 2010: Pinkney, Jerry. The Lion and the Mouse. New York: Little, Brown, and Co. Books for Young Readers, 2009.
- Caldecott Honor Book
  - 1989: McKissack, Patricia C. Mirandy and Brother Wind. Illustrated by Jerry Pinkney. New York: Knopf, 1988.
  - 1990: San Souci, Robert D. The Talking Eggs: A Folktale From the American South. Pictures by Jerry Pinkney. New York: Dial Books for Young Readers, 1989.
  - 1995: Lester, Julius. John Henry. Pictures by Jerry Pinkney. New York: Dial Books, 1994.
  - 2000: Andersen, Hans Christian. The Ugly Duckling. Adapted and illustrated by Jerry Pinkney. New York: Morrow Junior Books, 1999.
  - 2003: Pinkney, Jerry. Noah's Ark. New York: SeaStar Books, 2002.
- Coretta Scott King Book Award
  - 1986, for Illustrator: Flournoy, Valerie. The Patchwork Quilt. Pictures by Jerry Pinkney. New York: Dial, 1985.
  - 1987, for Illustrator: Dragonwagon, Crescent. Half a Moon and One Whole Star. Illustrated by Jerry Pinkney. New York:Macmillan Publishing Company, 1986.
  - 1989, for Illustrator: McKissack, Patricia C. Mirandy and Brother Wind. Illustrated by Jerry Pinkney. New York: Knopf, 1988.
  - 1997, for Illustrator: Schroeder, Alan. Minty: A Story of Young Harriet Tubman. Pictures by Jerry Pinkney. New York: Dial Books for Young Readers, 1996.
  - 2002, for Illustrator: McKissack, Patricia C. and Jerry Pinkney. Goin' Someplace Special. New York: Atheneum Books for Young Readers, 2001.
- Coretta Scott King Honor Award
  - 1981, for Illustrator: Zaslavsky, Claudia. Count on Your Fingers African Style. Illustrated by Jerry Pinkney. New York: Crowell, 1980.
  - 1990, for Illustrator: San Souci, Robert D. The Talking Eggs: A Folktale From the American South. Pictures by Jerry Pinkney. New York: Dial Books for Young Readers, 1989.
  - 2005, for Illustrator: Holiday, Billie and Arthur Herzog Jr. God Bless the Child. Illustrated by Jerry Pinkney. New York:HarperCollins/Amistad, 2004.
  - 2009, for Illustrator: Aston, Dianna Hutts. The Moon Over Star. Pictures by Jerry Pinkney. New York: Dial Books for Young Readers, 2008.
  - 2017 for Illustrator: Jackson, Richard. In Plain Sight. Illustrated by Jerry Pinkney. New York: Roaring Brook Press, 2016.
- Coretta Scott King-Virginia Hamilton Award
  - 2016, for Lifetime Achievement.
- Laura Ingalls Wilder Award
  - 2016: For American authors or illustrators who have contributed "significantly" to children's literature.
- New York Times/New York Public Library Best Illustrated Children's Books Award
  - 1989: Singer, Marilyn. Turtle in July. Illustrated by Jerry Pinkney. New York: Macmillan Publishing Co., 1989.
  - 1994: Pinkney, Gloria Jean. The Sunday Outing. Pictures by Jerry Pinkney. New York: Dial Books for Young Readers, 1994.
  - 1997: San Souci, Robert D. The Hired Hand: An African-American Folktale. Pictures by Jerry Pinkney. New York: Dial Books for Young Readers, 1997.
  - 2006: Pinkney, Jerry. The Little Red Hen. New York: Dial Books for Young Readers, 2006.
- Orbis Pictus Award
  - 2020: Wittenstein, Barry. A Place to Land: Martin Luther King Jr and the Speech That Inspired a Nation. Illustrated by Jerry Pinkney. New York: Holiday House, 2019.
- Phoenix Picture Book Award
  - 2016, Honor Book: Lester, Julius. Sam and the Tigers: A New Telling of Little Black Sambo. Pictures by Jerry Pinkney. New York: Dial Books for Young Readers, 1996.
- 2005 Regina Medal by the Catholic Library Association.
- Society of Illustrators
  - 2006: The Original Art Lifetime Achievement Award
  - Received four Gold medals
  - Received four Silver medals

=== Recognition ===
- In 1997, Pinkney was nominated for the biennial 1998 Hans Christian Andersen Award, considered to be the "Nobel Prize for children's literature."
- In 2000, Kent State University awarded Pinkney the Virginia Hamilton Literary Award, which honors creators of "multicultural literature" for youth.
- In 2004, Pinkney received the University of Southern Mississippi Medallion for his contributions to children's literature.
- In 2011, the New York Society of Illustrators inducted Pinkney into the organization's Hall of Fame for Pinkney's achievements and contributions as an artist.
- In 2013, Pinkney received the Distinguished Arts Award as part of the Pennsylvania Governor's Awards for the Arts.
- In 2016, the city of Philadelphia named July 19 "Jerry Pinkney Day" to honor Pinkney's achievements.
- In 2016, the Norman Rockwell Museum named Pinkney their Artist Laureate for his achievements as an illustrator.
- In 2016, Pinkney was nominated for the Hans Christian Andersen Award for 2018.

== Art exhibitions ==
- 1994, Fall: Featured in the Richard C. von Hess Illustration Gallery at the Philadelphia University of the Arts.
- 2000: Jerry Pinkney/ Brian Pinkney: Father & Son, hosted by the National Center for Children's Illustrated Literature in Texas.
- 2008, Fall/Winter: Featured in the Richard C. von Hess Illustration Gallery at the Philadelphia University of the Arts.
- 2010: Jerry Pinkney's African-American Journey to Freedom, featured in the Schomburg Center for Research in Black Culture.
- 2012: Witness: The Art of Jerry Pinkney, hosted by the Hudson River Museum in Yonkers, New York.
- 2013: Drawing on the Reverse Side: The Art and Life of Jerry Pinkney, displayed by Free Library of Philadelphia.
- 2016: Jerry Pinkney: Imaginings/An Artist's Explorations of Images and Words, featured by the Norman Rockwell Museum.
- 2017: The Storybook Magic of Jerry Pinkney, displayed by the Woodmere Art Museum in Philadelphia.
- 2019: Freedom's Journal: The Art of Jerry Pinkney, featured by the Woodmere Art Museum in Philadelphia.

== Postage stamps ==
In 1977, the United States Postal Service commissioned Pinkney to create the first stamp of the Black Heritage postage stamp series, a series honoring prolific African Americans in United States history. Pinkney completed a total of eleven portraits for the series, and his designs featured images of Harriet Tubman, Martin Luther King Jr., Benjamin Banneker, Whitney Young, Jackie Robinson, Scott Joplin, Carter Woodson, Mary McLeod Bethune and Sojourner Truth.
