= Rikki-Tikki-Tavi (film) =

1975 Soviet-Indian family film

- Russian: Рикки-Тикки-Тави
- Directed by: Nana Kldiashvili; Aleksandr Zguridi
- Written by: Rudyard Kipling; Nana Kldiashvili; Aleksandr Zguridi
- Based on: "Rikki-Tikki-Tavi" (1894) by Rudyard Kipling
- Starring: Igor Alekseyev; Vera Altayskaya; Aleksey Batalov; Irina Kartashyova; Andrey Mironov
- Cinematography: Vladimir Pustovalov; Vadim Ropeyko
- Edited by: Mariya Amosova
- Music by: Alfred Schnittke
- Release date: September 1976
- Running time: 78 minutes
- Country: Soviet Union
- Language: Russian

Rikki-Tikki-Tavi (Russian: Рикки-Тикки-Тави) is a 1975 Soviet family film directed by Nana Kldiashvili and Aleksandr Zguridi. It is based on the 1894 short story of the same name by Rudyard Kipling.

== Plot ==
The film takes place in the jungle of India. A forester Robert Lawson lives there, and his son Teddy walks, swims, and watches various animals with his boy John. Suddenly a thunderstorm begins and the boys are hiding near the shore. Before their eyes, the rapid current carries away animals, including a mongoose, which Teddy rushes to save.

== Cast ==
- Igor Alekseyev as Teddy
- Vera Altayskaya as Darzi the bird (voice)
- Aleksey Batalov as Robert Lawson
- Irina Kartashyova as Nagayna (voice)
- Andrey Mironov as Rikki-Tikki-Tavi (mongoose, voice)
- Yury Puzyryov as Nag (voice)
- Margarita Terekhova as Margaret Lawson
- Vasiliy Vasilev as Doctor
- Surendra Suri as Bernard Shibnell
