= Cheryl Hanna =

American artist

Cheryl Irene Hanna (born January 7, 1951) is an American artist and illustrator. Hanna was born in Ann Arbor, Michigan, dropped out of the Pratt Institute before she resumed her study and received her B.A. from the Pratt Institute in 1973.

Hanna is a painter, children's book illustrator who is also known for her work in the medium of collage. Hanna's work has been exhibited at the Newark Museum and the National Museum of Women in the Arts. Hanna's 1987 book, "The Enchanted Hair Tale", in collaboration with author Alexis de Veaux was honored by the Coretta Scott King Award. She has also illustrated biographies of Phillis Wheatley, Selma Burke, and Mary Fields.
