= Timeline of African American children's literature =

This is a timeline of African American Children's literature milestones in the United States from 1600 – present. The timeline also includes selected events in Black history and children's book publishing broadly.

== 17th century ==
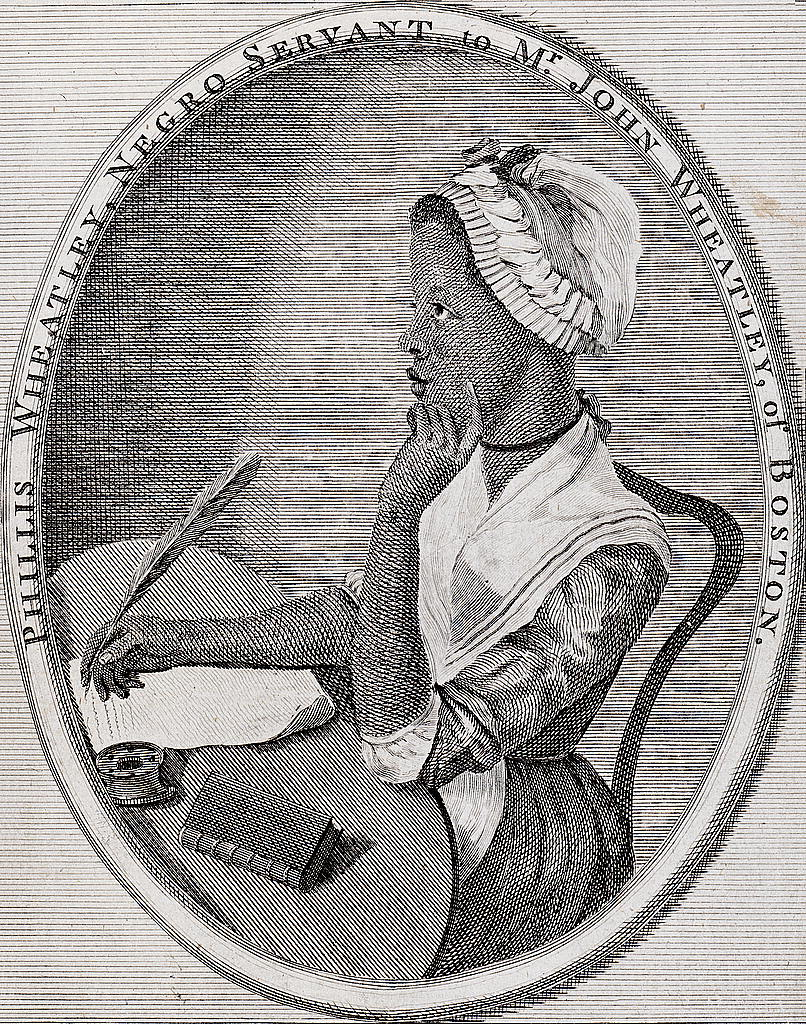
Frontispiece to Phillis Wheatley's Poems on Various Subjects

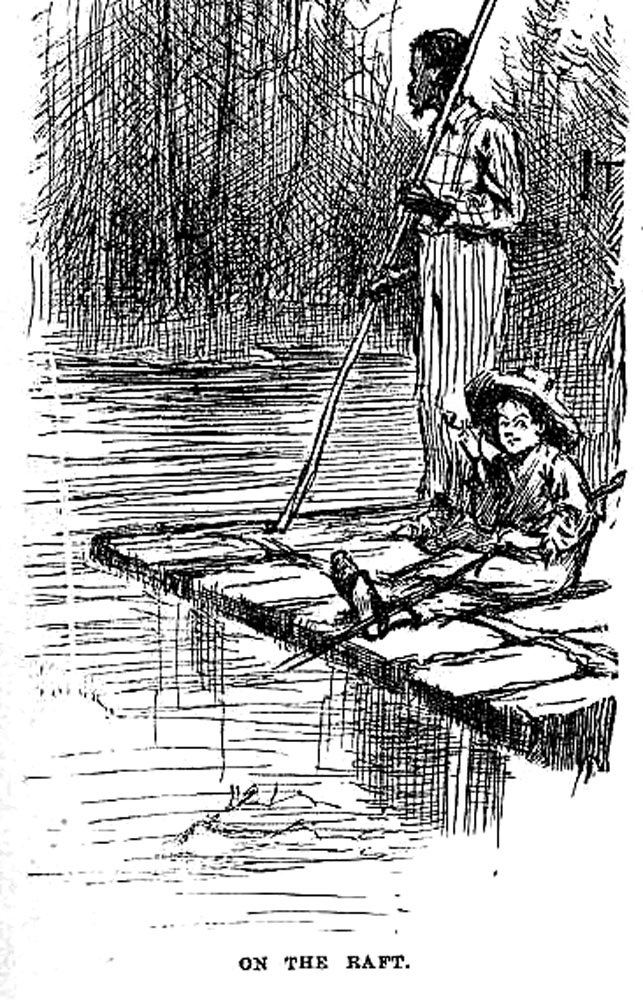
Jim standing on a raft alongside Huck from the Adventures of Huckleberry Finn

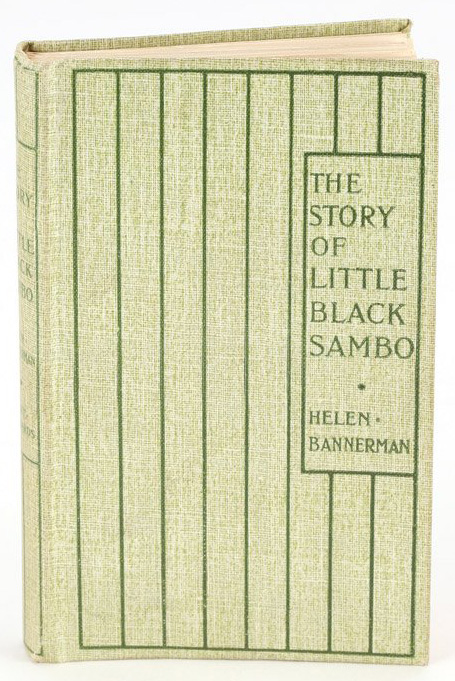
1st edition, The Story of Little Black Sambo by Helen Bannerman, 1899

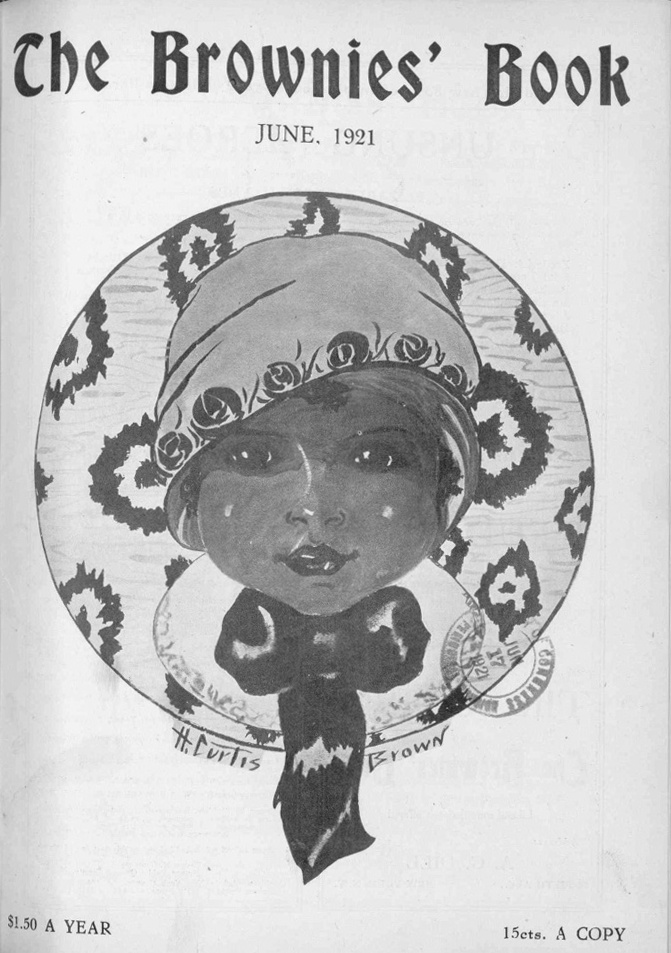
Cover of the June 1921 issue

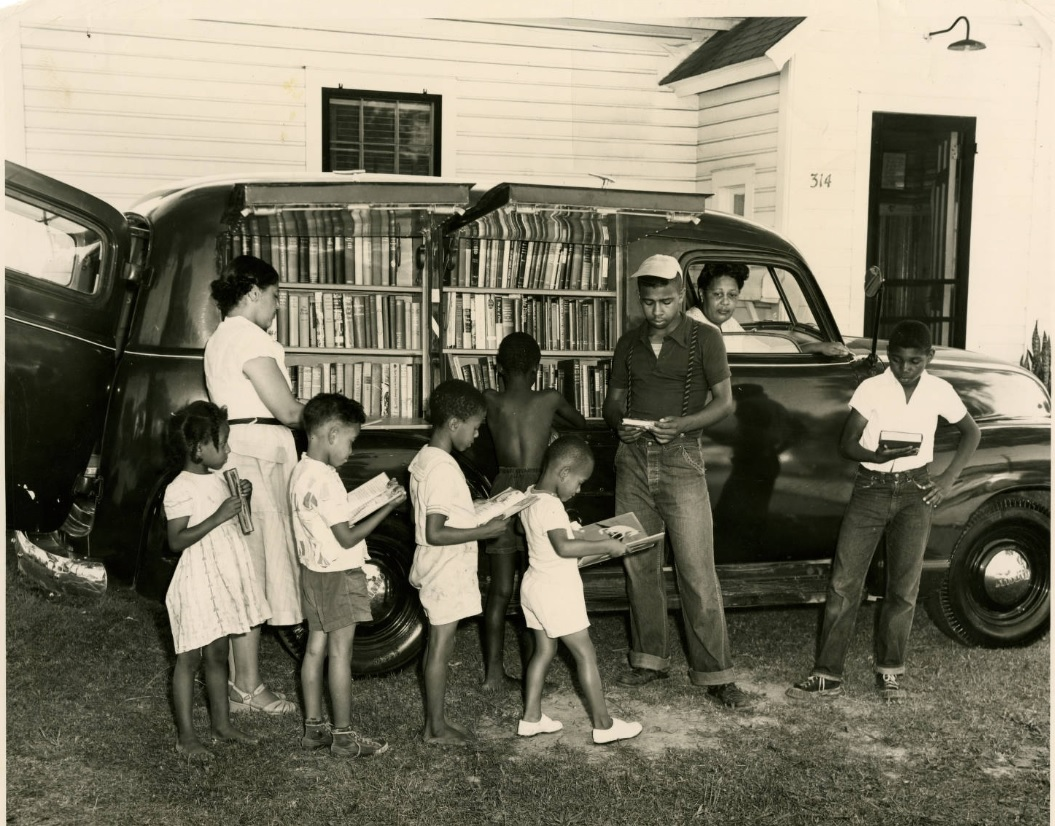
African-American children secure books at a North Carolina Albemarle Region bookmobile stop.

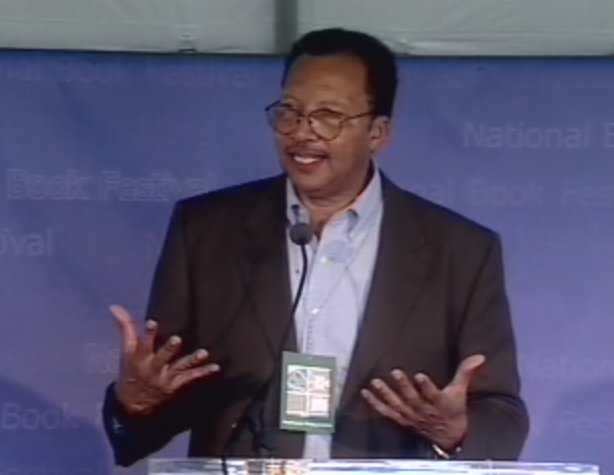
Walter Dean Myers at the Library of Congress in 2001

1619

The first record of Africans in English colonial America when men were brought at first to Fort Monroe off the coast of Hampton, Virginia, and then to the Jamestown colony.

== 18th century ==
1761

- Jupiter Hammon is known as a founder of African-American literature. His poem, "An Evening Thought: Salvation by Christ, with Penitential Cries," was published as a broadside in 1761, establishing Hammon as the first published African American poet.

1773

- Phillis Wheatley, the first African-American author of a published book of poetry, publishes Poems on Various Subjects, Religious and Moral.

1776–1783 The American Revolution

== 19th century ==
1847

- Frederick Douglass begins publication of the abolitionist newspaper the North Star.

1852

- Harriet Beecher Stowe publishes the anti-slavery novel, Uncle Tom's Cabin, in 1852. Josiah Henson, is the inspiration for one of the book's main characters.

1853

- Clotel; or, The President's Daughter by William Wells Brown is the first novel published by an African-American.

1859

- Harriet E. Wilson writes the autobiographical novel Our Nig.

1861

- The American Civil War begins on April 12 and lasts until April 9, 1865.

1865

- The Thirteenth Amendment to the United States Constitution prohibits slavery except as punishment for crime.

1868

- Elizabeth Keckly publishes Behind the Scenes (or, Thirty Years a Slave and Four Years in the White House).

1884

- Mark Twain's Adventures of Huckleberry Finn is published, featuring the enslaved African-American character Jim.

1887

- Amelia E. Johnson publishes Joy, an eight-page, monthly magazine for African American children.

1892

- Ida B. Wells publishes her pamphlet Southern Horrors: Lynch Law in All Its Phases.

1899 The Story of Little Black Sambo, written and illustrated by Scottish author Helen Bannerman, is published. The book, which would become popular around the world, presents a negative and stereotypical image of Black people.

== 20th century ==
=== 1900–1949 ===
1901

- Booker T. Washington's autobiography Up from Slavery is published.

1903

- W. E. B. Du Bois's seminal work The Souls of Black Folk is published.

1909

- The National Negro Committee meets and is formed; it will be the precursor to the National Association for the Advancement of Colored People (NAACP), an interracial group devoted to civil rights.

1913

- Mary White Ovington, a white co-founder of the NAACP, publishes Hazel, a novel about a middle-class Black child.

1919

- Children's Book Week is established in the United States.
- Louise Seaman Bechtel is hired by Macmillan as the first children's book editor in the first US department devoted solely to publishing children's books.

1920

- W.E.B. DuBois publishes The Brownies’ Books, a monthly magazine for African American children that includes fiction, poetry, and world events. Author and teacher Jessie Redmon Fauset is the editor.

1926

- Historian Carter G. Woodson proposes Negro History Week.

1927

- Charlemae Hill Rollins is hired by the Chicago Public Library as a children's librarian. She would later write We Build Together: A Reader's Guide to Negro Life and Literature for Elementary and High School Use, a bibliography of books with positive representations of African Americans.

1928

- Claude McKay's Home to Harlem wins the Harmon Gold Award for Literature.

1928

- Popo and Fifina: Children of Haiti is the first children's novel by and about Blacks. The authors are Arna Bontemps and Langston Hughes. Cartoonist E. Simms Campbell is the illustrator.

1936

- The American Booksellers Association establishes the National Book Awards.

1937

- Zora Neale Hurston writes the novel Their Eyes Were Watching God
- Augusta Braxton Baker is hired as the children's librarian for the New York Public Library. Under her direction, the James Weldon Johnson Collection is established to promote books with positive portrayals of African Americans.

1938

- The Caldecott Medal, named for Randolph Caldecott, a nineteenth-century English illustrator, is established to honor the artists of the most distinguished American picture book for children.

1940

- Hattie McDaniel becomes the first African-American to win an Academy Award for Best Supporting Actress for her performance as Mammy in Gone with the Wind.

1945

- Jesse C. Jackson's Call Me Charley is the first contemporary children's novel with a Black protagonist.
- Two is a Team, an interracial friendship story, by Lorraine and Jerrold Beim, is illustrated by Ernest Crichlow. This is the first picture book illustrated by an African American artist.

1947

- John Hope Franklin authors the non-fiction book From Slavery to Freedom.

=== 1950–1999 ===
1951

- Little Brown Koko, a series of short stories illustrating Black characters in a stereotypical manner are introduced in a book collection by Blanche Seale Hunt.

1952

- Ralph Ellison authors the novel Invisible Man which wins the National Book Award.

1953

- The Jane Addams Children's Book Awards for books that best promote peace, social justice, world community, equality of the sexes and all races is established.

1954

- The U.S. Supreme Court rules against the "separate but equal" doctrine in Brown v. Board of Education of Topeka, Kans.

1955

- Rosa Parks refuses to give up her seat on a bus, starting the Montgomery bus boycott.

1956

- Arna W. Bontemps receives the Jane Addams Children's Book Award for Story of the Negro. He is the first African American to receive the award.

1958

- Publication of Here I Stand, Paul Robeson's manifesto-autobiography.

1959

- Motown Records is founded by Berry Gordy.
- A Raisin in the Sun, a play by Lorraine Hansberry, debuts on Broadway.

1960

- Ruby Bridges becomes the first African American child to attend an all-white elementary school in the South (William Frantz Elementary School) following court-ordered integration in New Orleans, Louisiana. This event was portrayed by Norman Rockwell in his 1964 painting The Problem We All Live With.

1962

- The picture book The Snowy Day, written and illustrated by Ezra Jack Keats is published. It is regarded as the first picture book to portray an African American child as a protagonist.

1963

- The March on Washington for Jobs and Freedom is held. Martin Luther King Jr. gives his I Have a Dream speech.

1964

- Whitney Young, Jr., National Urban League executive director, criticizes American book publishers in an August 22 syndicated article titled “NYC's ‘Segregated Zoo’” for omitting African Americans from children's books.
- The Council on Interracial Books for Children is founded in response to the lack of ethnically diverse books available to Mississippi's Freedom Schools.

1965

- Nancy Larrick, former president of the International Reading Association, publishes “The All-White World of Children's Books” in the Saturday Review. Larrick is critical of publishers for their lack of African American characters in children's books. As evidence, Larrick analyzed more than 5,000 children's books published between 1962 and 1964 and identifies only 40 with illustrations or text related to contemporary African Americans.
- The Council on Interracial Books for Children is founded to promote nonwhite authors through book reviews, awards, and other tactics.

1966

- Nichelle Nichols is cast as a female black officer on television's Star Trek.

1967

- The first Boston Globe - Horn Book Award for excellence in children's and young adult literature is presented.

1969

- The Coretta Scott King Book Awards are established to honor outstanding Black authors and illustrators of children and young adult books.

1971

- Ernest J. Gaines's Reconstruction-era novel The Autobiography of Miss Jane Pittman is published.

1972

- Tom Feelings is the first African American to win a Caldecott Honor Award for illustrating Moja Means One: A Swahili Counting Book.

1973

- Ebony Jr.!, a monthly children's magazine, is launched by the Johnson Publishing Company with John H. Johnson as publisher and Constance Van Brunt Johnson as editor.

1974

- African American illustrator Tom Feelings and author Muriel Feelings win the Boston Globe–Horn Book Award for picture books Jambo Means Hello: Swahili Alphabet Book.
- The Carter G. Woodson Book Award is established to honor exemplary books written for ethnic minority children and young people in the United States. The award is given by the National Council Social Studies Annual Conference.

1975

- Virginia Hamilton is the first African American to win the Newbery Medal for M.C. Higgins, the Great.

1976

- The novel Roots: The Saga of an American Family by Alex Haley is published.
- Leo and Diane Dillon are the first illustrators of color to win a Caldecott Medal Award for illustrating Why Mosquitoes Bizz in People's Ears.

1977

- Mildred D. Taylor's Roll of Thunder, Hear My Cry wins the Newbery Medal.

1980

- The Council on Interracial Books for Children publishes a checklist of Ten Quick Ways to Analyze Children's Books for Sexism and Racism.

1982

- Michael Jackson releases Thriller, which becomes the best-selling album of all time.
- Rudine Sims Bishop publishes in Shadow and Substance: Afro-American Experience in Contemporary Children's Fiction the findings from a survey of images and representations in Black children's literature published between 1965 and 1980.

1985

- The Cooperative Children's Book Center, School of Education at the University of Wisconsin – Madison begins annual documentation of the number of books published in the United States for children which are written and/or illustrated by African Americans.

1986

- Established by legislation in 1983, Martin Luther King Jr. Day on January 20 is first celebrated as a national holiday in the United States.
- Valerie Flournoy, author of The Patchwork Quilt, illustrated by Jerry Pinkney, wins the Ezra Jack Keats New Writer Award.

1988

- Just Us Books, a publishing house focused on African American children and young adult books, is founded by Wade and Cheryl Hudson.

1991

- Tom Low and Philip Lee co-found Lee & Low Books, a multicultural children's book publisher in the United States.

1992

- The African American Children's Book Fair started in Philadelphia by Vanesse Lloyd-Sgambati.

1995

- The Million Man March in Washington, D.C., is co-initiated by Louis Farrakhan and James Bevel.

1996

- The NAACP Image Award for Outstanding Literary Work, Children's is established.

== 21st century ==
=== 2000–present ===
2006

- The Cybils Awards are founded by children's book and young adult literature bloggers to honor books with literary merit and kid appeal.

2007

- The Brown Bookshelf blog, to promote African American picture books, Middle Grade and Young Adult novels written and illustrated by African Americans. Each year the blog hosts 28 Days Later, a daily feature during Black History Month featuring Black authors and illustrators.

2008

- Barack Obama is elected 44th President of the United States of America, the first African-American to become president.

2009

- Ashley Bryan is the first African American to receive the Laura Ingalls Wilder Award honoring an author or illustrator, published in the United States

2010

- The Walt Disney Company crowns its first African-American Disney Princess, Tiana.
- Educators Sandra Hughes-Hassell and Ernie J. Cox publish Inside Board Books: Representations of People of Color in The Library Quarterly.

2014

- Author Walter Dean Myers writes in a March 16 New York Times an opinion piece titled “Where are the People of Color in Children's Books.” His son Christopher Myers writes a companion piece titled “The Apartheid of Children's Literature."
- A panel titled “Blockbuster Reads: Meet the Kids Authors That Dazzle” featuring only white men at the inaugural BookCon conference in New York City ignites widespread criticism and outcry for more diversity in children's book publishing.
- The social media hashtag #WeNeedDiverseBooks is launched.

2015

- Publisher Lee & Low Books partner with St. Catherine University (St. Paul, MN) to initiate The Diversity Baseline Survey, an industry study to uncover publishing and reviewer employment statistics in the areas of gender, race/ethnicity, sexual orientation, and disability.

2022

- Social Entrepreneur and Children's Book Author Veronica N. Chapman launches Black Children's Book Week, a week dedicated to celebrating Black children and the people who make sure they are represented in children's books.

== See also ==
- Childhood in literature
- Children's literature criticism
- Coretta Scott King Award
- Disability in children's literature
- Native Americans in children's literature
- International Children's Digital Library
- Internet Archive's Children's Library
- African American history
- Young adult fiction
- List of African-American firsts
- Timeline of African-American history
- List of children's book series
- List of children's classic books
- List of children's literature authors
- List of children's non-fiction writers
- List of fairy tales
- List of illustrators
- List of publishers of children's books
- List of translators of children's books
