= Non-fiction comics =

Literary genre

Paul Revere profiled in a King Features comic strip, "Heroes of American History" by Nicholas Afonsky, on September 27, 1936

Non-fiction comics, also known as graphic non-fiction, is non-fiction in the comics medium, embracing a variety of formats from comic strips to trade paperbacks.

== Foundations ==
Non-fiction comics evolved from classic literary journalism and the relatively younger comics medium. Before photography came to be, and before technological innovations could allow for it to be applied the way it is in the news today, many events in newspaper publications were illustrated. As comics grew as a medium in the late 1800s and early 1900s, it allowed for a new form of non-fiction story telling. Speaking to the strengths of this medium Josh Neufeld, author of A.D.: New Orleans After the Deluge, said, "I think it is one of the most personal and intimate ways to tell stories. Readers feel like they are having an actual conversation with characters, rather than reading quotes in a newspaper or seeing talking heads on T.V."

== Comic strips and comic books ==
Traditionally, comic strips have long offered factual material in this category, notably Ripley's Believe It or Not!, John Hix's Strange as It Seems, Ralph Graczak's Our Own Oddities, King Features' Heroes of American History, Gordon Johnston's It Happened in Canada, and others. Dick's Adventures in Dreamland was another attempt by King Features to teach history with comics. Clayton Knight created a strip about aviators, The Hall of Fame of the Air (1935–40), later collected in a book. Texas History Movies, which began on October 5, 1926, in The Dallas Morning News, received praise from educators, as did America's Best Buy: The Louisiana Purchase, a 1953 daily strip in the New Orleans States, distributed nationally by the Register and Tribune Syndicate, which also handled Will Eisner's The Spirit supplement for Sunday newspapers.

Contemporary nonfiction comic strips include Biographic, Health Capsules, The K Chronicles, and You Can with Beakman and Jax.

Non-fiction was published in numerous comic books in the 1940s, notably Picture News (Lafayette Street Corporation), True Comics (Parents' Magazine Press), Heroic Comics (Eastern Color Printing), It Really Happened and Real Life Comics (both Standard/Better/Nedor). A notable scripter of this material for 1940s comic books was novelist Patricia Highsmith, who wrote for Real Fact Comics (DC Comics), Real Heroes (also Parents' Magazine Press), and True Comics.

A notable nonfiction comic from the 1950s was the 1957 one-shot Martin Luther King and the Montgomery Story, a 16-page comic book about Martin Luther King Jr., Rosa Parks, and the Montgomery bus boycott, published and distributed by the Fellowship of Reconciliation.

Ever since the 1950s, the Federal Reserve Bank of New York has produced free, educational comic books. The stories feature fictional characters but contain lessons about financial literacy and the work of the Fed. One title, Once Upon a Dime, has been produced a number of times in different iterations, updating its content as society has evolved.

Fitzgerald Publishing Co. produced the Golden Legacy line of educational black history comic books from 1966 to 1976. Golden Legacy produced biographies of such notable figures as Harriet Tubman, Crispus Attucks, Benjamin Banneker, Matthew Henson, Alexandre Dumas, Frederick Douglass, Robert Smalls, Joseph Cinqué, Thurgood Marshall, Martin Luther King Jr., Alexander Pushkin, Lewis Howard Latimer, and Granville Woods. Golden Legacy was the brainchild of African American accountant Bertram Fitzgerald, who also wrote seven of the volumes. Many of the other contributors to the Golden Legacy series were also black, including Joan Bacchus and Tom Feelings. Other notable contributors included Don Perlin and Tony Tallarico.

Harvey Pekar's originally self-published comic book series American Splendor (published from 1976 to 2008) "helped change the appreciation for, and perceptions of, the graphic novel, the drawn memoir, [and] the autobiographical comic narrative." He was the first author to publicly distribute "memoir comic books."

Larry Gonick (The Cartoon History of the Universe) produced graphic non-fiction about science and history for more than 30 years.

Joe Sacco's nine-issue series Palestine (Fantagraphics, 1993–1995) — about his experiences in the West Bank and the Gaza Strip in December 1991 and January 1992 — broke new ground in the realm of comics journalism.

Other contemporary nonfiction comic books include the For Beginners series and The Manga Guides. A growing number of graphic medicine comics have been written over the past decade by those who revealed their personal experiences with their own or another person's illness or disability.

Researchers have analyzed the truthfulness or authenticity of graphic non-fiction and graphic biographies. According to Robert V. Bullough Jr, and Stefinee Pinnegar, the reader expects the truth, but comparative studies concluded that graphics are less objective than textual biographies due to the pictorial material. Textual biographies present more information about the subject, while graphic biographies focus more on individual events, statements, and emotions, and present them more appealingly.

== Books ==
Since the publication of Art Spiegelman's Maus in 1986, there have been many non-fiction "graphic novels" published in the realms of history, biography, autobiography, education, and journalism. Francisca Goldsmith, writing in the School Library Journal in 2008, assembled a "list of essential titles for high schoolers" and reviewed graphic nonfiction by a variety of creators, including Rick Geary (Treasury of Victorian Murder), Harvey Pekar (Students for a Democratic Society), Stan Mack (The Story of the Jews), Joe Sacco (Palestine), Marjane Satrapi (Persepolis), Osamu Tezuka (Buddha) and Howard Zinn (A People's History of American Empire).

Other examples are The 9/11 Report: A Graphic Adaptation (2006) and After 9/11: America's War on Terror (2007), both by Sid Jacobson and Ernie Colón. Hill & Wang, which published the 9/11 books, has published several other works of graphic non-fiction, including Ted Rall's After We Kill You We Will Welcome You as Honored Guests: Unembedded in Afghanistan.

In A.D.: New Orleans After the Deluge (2009), Josh Neufeld documented true stories of survival during Hurricane Katrina as witnessed by a diverse group of New Orleanians.

In Italian Winter (2010), Davide Toffolo documented a story of two children from Slovenia in Fascist concentration camp in Italy.

In March (2013), U.S. Rep. John Lewis recalled his childhood, his entry into the American civil rights movement and his first encounter with Martin Luther King Jr., and his first experiences with nonviolent resistance. March: Book One (2013) was followed by Book Two (2015) and Book Three (2016).

In The Forgotten Man Graphic Edition: A New History of the Great Depression (2014), Amity Shlaes recounted her earlier history of America's Great Depression.

Seven Stories Press has published Ted Rall's comic-format biographies of Edward Snowden (Snowden), Bernie Sanders (Sanders) and Pope Francis (Francis: The People's Pope).

Red Quill Books has published a series of political, non-fiction comics including an illustrated version of the Communist Manifesto (2010-2015), a manga version of Das Capital (2012), and the Last Days of Che Guevara.

Feeding Ghosts by Tessa Hulls is a graphic memoir that won the Pulitzer Prize in 2025.

== See also ==
- Autobiographical comics
- Comics in education
- Comics journalism
- Graphic novel
