= Bernette Ford =

African-American author, editor and publisher (1950–2021)

- Born: June 30, 1950; New York City, U.S.
- Died: June 20, 2021 (aged 70); New York City, U.S.
- Education: Connecticut College (BA)
- Occupations: Author, editor, publisher
- Spouse: George Ford

Bernette Ford (June 30, 1950 – June 20, 2021) was an American author, editor and publisher. She worked as editor-in-chief at Grosset & Dunlap and later Scholastic Books, where she was vice-president of the Cartwheel imprint, which she helped launch. She was known for being one of the few African-American editors working with children's books, having begun her career in the 1970s.

== Early life and education ==
Bernette Ford was born on June 30, 1950, in Brooklyn. She was the daughter of Morton, a white factory worker, and Martha Goldsen, a black actress, music teacher, singer and seamstress. She grew up in Uniondale, Long Island. Ford graduated in 1972 from Connecticut College. She was encouraged by family and friends to become a writer, but due to her lack of knowledge with the profession, Ford instead pursued the publishing career as "a way to get a foot in the door".

== Career ==
In the same year she graduated, Ford joined Random House's division of children's books as "editorial assistant in training", as part of their "minorities recruitment program." Ford remained in that position for the first two years there. Around 1975, she met Valerie Flournoy, Phyllis Fogelman and Tom Feelings, who created a workshop "for the few people of color working in publishing in the mid-1970s." They eventually founded a group called Black Creators for Children, which would assist African American authors in creating new works by following a set of philosophies. She met her husband, George Ford, during a meeting with this group.

After seven years working for Random House, Ford was hired by Western Publishing to work as senior editor of their children's books imprint, Golden Books. In 1983, she moved to Grosset & Dunlap to work as editor-in-chief, and was then promoted to publisher. During her six years there, Ford worked on expanding The Little Engine That Could property. In 1989 she began working with Scholastic Books and helped the company launch their new imprint, Cartwheel Books. Ford was the vice-president and editorial director of the imprint, and was responsible for starting the I Spy and the Little Bill series, the latter authored by Bill Cosby.

While Ford was working for Scholastic, a friend and co-founder of Just Us Books, Cheryl Willis Hudson, contacted her wanting to turn a poem she had written into a children's book aimed for black children. Bernette decided to turn the poem into a children's picture book instead, which was then illustrated by George. This was the first time she collaborated as a coauthor.

Ford worked with Scholastic until 2002, when she decided to leave to found her own company in 2003, a book packaging business called Color-Bridge Books. The company's first job was the production of a new series for beginner readers, called Just for You!. All the books were illustrated and written by people of color.

== Personal life and death ==
Bernette was married to George Ford. She died of lung cancer on June 20, 2021, at her house in Brooklyn.

== Selected works ==
- Cheryl Willis Hudson; Bernette G. Ford (1990). Bright Eyes, Brown Skin. Just Us Books. ISBN 9780590454162.
- Bernette G. Ford (2003). Hurry Up!. Just for You! series. Fitzgerald Books. ISBN 9781424202195.
- Bernette G. Ford (2008). No More Pacifier for Piggy!. Boxer Books. ISBN 9781905417896.
