= Joan Maynard =

Joan Maynard may refer to:

- Joan Maynard (politician), English politician and trade unionist
- Joan Maynard (preservationist), American artist, author, community organizer, and preservationist
- Joan Ann Maynard, British actress
