= John Clapp =

John Clapp may refer to:

- John Clapp (artist), illustrator of children's books and professor
- John Clapp (baseball) (1851–1904), player and manager in Major League Baseball
