= The Black Napoleon =

The Black Napoleon may refer to:

- Toussaint Louverture (1743–1803), a leader of the Haitian Revolution
- Jacob Morenga (c. 1875–1907), a leader of the 1904–1908 insurrection in German South-West Africa
- Shaka (c. 1787 – c. 1828) was the leader of the Zulu Kingdom in the early 19th century.
- John W. Cooper (1873–1966), American ventriloquist
