= The Tales of Uncle Remus: The Adventures of Brer Rabbit =

1987 children's book by Julius Lester

The Tales of Uncle Remus: The Adventures of Br'er Rabbit
- First edition
- Author: Julius Lester
- Illustrator: Jerry Pinkney
- Language: English
- Genre: Children's U.S. folklore
- Published: 1987 (Dial Press)
- Publication place: United States
- Media type: Print (hardback)
- Pages: 151
- ISBN: 9780803702721
- OCLC: 12554606

The Tales of Uncle Remus: The Adventures of Brer Rabbit is a 1987 Children's book by Julius Lester and illustrator Jerry Pinkney. It is a retelling of the American Br'er Rabbit tales.

== Reception ==
Publishers Weekly in a review of The Tales of Uncle Remus wrote "This collection is important as a way of introducing readers to the Harris tales; it also stands alone as a volume of wonderfully funny folktales. For many purists, though, it will not replace the original stories. Pinkney's drawings, both black-and-white and color, nicely combine realistic detail and fancy." School Library Journal wrote "His [Lester's] retellings are as lively as the originals but they also have a liveliness of their own, as he incorporates modern allusions which never seem out of place." and "Pinkney's illustrations .. do not have the sass of the original A. B. Frost illustrations, but they are filled with strong interest and a great humor which serves the text well. "

June Jordan, writing in The New York Times called it "Beautifully written" but criticized the stories writing "If these folk tales were not meant for children (quiet or otherwise), then the relentless chicanery of the protagonist would not matter so much, nor would the sometimes positively homicidal humor of the material" and concluded "This misbegotten resurrection is a terrible waste of very considerable talents. Julius Lester comes through at his irresistible best, as a compelling and frequently hilarious teller of tall tales. Every single illustration by Jerry Pinkney is fastidious, inspired and a marvel of delightful imagination. Perhaps Mr. Lester and Mr. Pinkney will soon collaborate on new material more worthy of their labors. Certainly, I hope so."

== Awards ==
- 1988 Coretta Scott King Book Illustration Award - honor
- 1988 Horn Book Fanfare Book - Folklore
