= To Be a Slave =

1968 children's book by Julius Lester

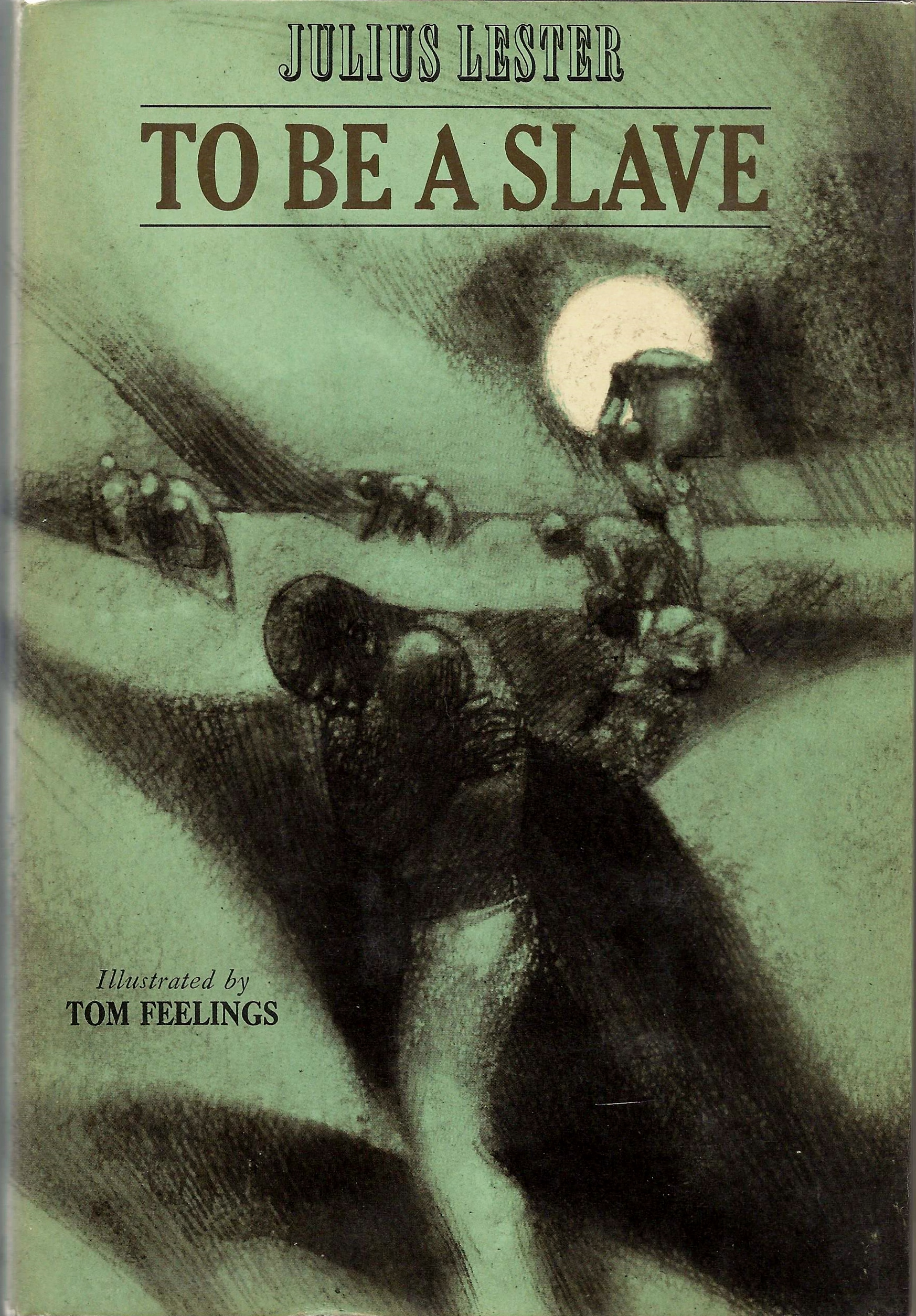
- First edition
- Author: Julius Lester
- Illustrator: Tom Feelings
- Language: English
- Genre: Children's literature
- Publisher: Dial Books for Young Readers
- Publication date: 1968
- Publication place: United States
- Media type: Print
- Pages: 156
- ISBN: 0590424602
- OCLC: 779012750
- Followed by: To Be a Slave, Long Journey Home (Dial, 1972)

To Be A Slave is a 1968 nonfiction children's book by Julius Lester, illustrated by Tom Feelings. It explores what it was like to be a slave. The book includes many personal accounts of former slaves, accompanied by Lester's historical commentary and Feelings' powerful and muted paintings. To Be a Slave has been a touchstone in children's literature for more than 30 years.

== Awards ==
To Be a Slave has won numerous awards, including the 1968 Newbery Honor medal. It was an ALA Notable Book, won the School Library Journal's Best Book of the Year, and Smithsonian Magazine's Best Book of the Year. It was given a 1970 Lewis Carroll Shelf Award.
