= Black Cowboy, Wild Horses =

1998 children's book by Julius Lester

Black Cowboy, Wild Horses: A True Story
- First edition cover of Black Cowboy, Wild Horses
- Author: Julius Lester
- Illustrator: Jerry Pinkney
- Language: English
- Genre: Children's literature, biography, picture book
- Published: 1998 (Dial Press)
- Publication place: United States
- Media type: Print (hardback)
- Pages: 40
- ISBN: 9780803717879
- OCLC: 37107211

Black Cowboy, Wild Horses: A True Story is a 1998 children's picture book by Julius Lester and illustrator Jerry Pinkney. It is about an ex-slave and Black cowboy, Bob Lemmons, who, by himself, wrangles a herd of wild horses to a corral.

== Reception ==
The Horn Book Magazine, in a review of Black Cowboy, wrote: "In vivid, poetic prose, Lester tells the tale of a uniquely talented man, cowboy Bob Lemmons. .. Pinkney's magnificent earth-toned paintings bring to life the wild beauty of the horses and the western plains, the dark drama of a nighttime thunderstorm, the fierce battle of the stallions", and concluded: "This latest collaboration evokes the legendary stature of one of these real men, as well as the majesty and romance of the Wild West."

School Library Journal wrote: "Pinkney's pictures were never better, making it all the more unfortunate that text boxes cover some of the action. Lester's overuse of metaphor is also a drawback. Still, this book will inspire heavy-duty thinking on the part of young readers." Booklist found that "Lester and Pinkney's manifest love and respect for the West and cowboys of color, whose contributions have been too long overlooked, distinguish their latest collaboration."

Publishers Weekly gave the book a starred review, stating: "Notable for the light it sheds on a fascinating slice of Americana, this book is essential for anyone interested in the Wild West."

Black Cowboy has also been reviewed by Kirkus Reviews, and Parenting.

== Awards ==
- 1998 Parents Choice Story Books Award - Silver Honor
