= Golden Legacy =

Line of educational Black history comic books

- The cover of Golden Legacy vol. 1 (1966). Illustration of Toussaint Louverture by Leo Carty.

Publication information
- Publisher: Fitzgerald Publishing Co.
- Schedule: Irregular
- Format: standard
- Genre: Black history
- Publication date: 1966–1976
- No. of issues: 16

Creative team
- Written by: Bertram Fitzgerald, Joan Bacchus, Don Perlin, Leo Carty, Tom Feelings, Robert Fitzgerald, Warren Parker, Francis Taylor
- Artist(s): Joan Bacchus, Leo Carty, Howard Darden, Tom Feelings, Ezra Jackson, Don Perlin, Tony Tallarico
- Editor(s): Bertram Fitzgerald

Golden Legacy was the umbrella title for a line of educational Black history comic books published by Fitzgerald Publishing Co. from 1966 to 1976. Golden Legacy published comic book biographies of such notable figures as Toussaint Louverture, Harriet Tubman, Crispus Attucks, Benjamin Banneker, Matthew Henson, Alexandre Dumas, Frederick Douglass, Robert Smalls, Joseph Cinqué, Walter F. White, Roy Wilkins, Thurgood Marshall, Martin Luther King Jr., Alexander Pushkin, Lewis Howard Latimer, and Granville Woods.

After acquiring corporate sponsorship from Coca-Cola Company and a number of other prominent corporations, Golden Legacy published a total of nine million copies of its 16 32-page full-color volumes, distributing many of them to schools, libraries, churches, and civil rights organizations.

Golden Legacy was the brainchild of African American accountant Bertram Fitzgerald, who also wrote seven of the volumes. Many of the other contributors to the Golden Legacy series were also Black, including Joan Bacchus and Tom Feelings. Other notable contributors included Don Perlin and Tony Tallarico.

== Publication history ==
=== Origins ===
Bertram A. Fitzgerald, Jr. (b. November 6, 1932, in Harlem, New York; died January 10, 2017, in New York City) became interested in Black history thanks to his seventh-grade history teacher, who made sure to highlight the contributions of Blacks in various fields. Fitzgerald read Classics Illustrated comic books as a child, but was frustrated to see the African American experience either negatively stereotyped or omitted in their pages.

After serving in the U.S. Air Force, he eventually graduated from Brooklyn College in 1956 with a degree in accounting. By the mid-1960s, at that point employed by the New York State Department of Taxation and Finance, Fitzgerald decided to create a line of nonfiction comic books to inspire and educate his fellow African Americans.

Fitzgerald's goal was to help "develop greater pride and self-esteem in Black youngsters and adults." Fitzgerald felt that whites were also harmed by the omission of Blacks in the history books. As he said, "It encourages them to think that they made every worthwhile contribution to society, and it misleads them to believe that they are somehow superior."

=== Golden Legacy ===
Contacting former Air Force colleague Leo Carty, Fitzgerald commissioned Carty to write and illustrate a comic book story about Toussaint Louverture and the birth of Haiti. After some difficulty finding a printer willing to print color comics on Black history, Fitzgerald now had to find distribution. Shut out of the traditional newsstand distribution system due to the focus on Black history, Fitzgerald hooked up with a group of independent distributors called "commission men", who supplied the Black community with specialized beauty products and books. The result was the first volume of the Golden Legacy Illustrated History Magazine, published in 1966.

Joan Maynard (as Joan Bacchus), became an early contributor to Golden Legacy. She worked with cartoonist Tom Feelings on the Saga of Harriet Tubman volume (issue #2; 1966). (She later also wrote and pencilled issues about Matthew Henson [issue #5; 1969] and Joseph Cinqué and La Amistad mutiny [issue #10; 1970].)

Although the commission men network enabled Fitzgerald to get his comics to his intended audience, he had trouble collecting payment. After distributing two issues of Golden Legacy this way, issues #3–11 of Golden Legacy were published with the assistance of The Coca-Cola Company. Fitzgerald approached the Coca-Cola for assistance, making the case that Blacks bought more Coca-Cola per capita than white customers, and that the company should cater more to that audience by supporting his struggling publishing company. Beginning with issue #3, Coke purchased many copies of Golden Legacy in bulk (at a volume discount), distributing them to schools, libraries, churches, and organizations such as the NAACP, the National Urban League and Reading Is Fundamental programs. With Coke's backing, Fitzgerald was also able to connect with better printing services.

The contents of Golden Legacy issue #3, on Crispus Attucks and the Minutemen, had already been created by cartoonist Tom Feelings for another publication; the story was adapted into the third volume of the Golden Legacy series, published in 1967. African-American historian Benjamin Arthur Quarles, then a professor of History at Morgan State College, was brought on as a consultant, and the issue featured a full-color back cover ad for the Coca-Cola Company featuring photos of African American models.

Howard Darden became Fitzgerald's art director with issue #7; he also illustrated volumes on Frederick Douglass (issues #7–8; 1969–1970) and ancient African kingdoms (issue #15; 1972).

The series' final issues enjoyed sponsorship from such companies as A&P, AT&T, Avon, the Bowery Savings Bank, Columbia Pictures, Equitable Life, Exxon, McDonald's, Philadelphia Electric, and Woolworth's.

Golden Legacy's final issue, #16, on the Black inventors Lewis Howard Latimer and Granville Woods, was published in 1976.

== Baylor Publishing Company copyright infringement ==
In 1983, Seattle, Washington-based Bill R. Baylor of Baylor Publishing Co. and Community Enterprizes [sic], fraudulently convinced Fitzgerald's printer that he had bought the business from Fitzgerald. Baylor then used the original plates and negatives to republish the Golden Legacy series under his imprint. Bertram Fitzgerald sued for copyright infringement and won after a five-year court battle. In 1988 he got the negatives back and was able to publish his own comics again. Baylor, meanwhile, disappeared and never paid the damages he had been assessed by the court.

== Other Fitzgerald titles ==
In 1970 Fitzgerald Publishing produced a single issue of the public service publication Drugs... Where It's At, which Fitzgerald wrote and was illustrated by Tony Tallarico. Tallarico was known for co-creating Lobo in 1965, the first comic book title to star an African-American hero. (Tallarico also illustrated some stories in Golden Legacy.)

Fitzgerald Publishing followed the Golden Legacy series with seven issues of the integrated teen humor comic Fast Willie Jackson in 1976 and 1977. It was written by Fitzgerald and illustrated by Gus Lemoine.

== Issues ==
Issue	Date	Title	Writer	Artist	Notes
1	1966	The Saga of Toussaint L'Ouverture and the Birth of Haiti	Leo Carty	Leo Carty	Short backup stories about Charles R. Drew and Estevanico
2	1966	The Saga of Harriet Tubman, the Moses of her people	Joan Bacchus	Tom Feelings	Short back-up stories about Daniel Hale Williams, Ira Aldridge, Bishop James Augustine Healy, and Jean Baptiste Pointe Du Sable
3	1967	Crispus Attucks and the Minutemen	Tom Feelings	Tom Feelings	Short back-up stories by Ezra Jackson about Deborah Sampson, James Armistead Lafayette, Peter Salem, and James Forten
4	1968	The Life of Benjamin Banneker	Francis Taylor	Ezra Jackson	Short back-up stories about Walter Washington and Bishop Richard Allen
5	1969	The Life of Matthew Henson	Joan Bacchus	Joan Bacchus	Short backup stories about Chevalier de Saint-Georges and Katherine Johnson
6	1969	Alexander Dumas and Family	Bertram Fitzgerald	Ezra Jackson	Biographical stories of Thomas-Alexandre Dumas (1762-1806), Alexandre Dumas (1802-1870), and Alexandre Dumas fils (1824-1895). One-page backup stories about Chevalier de Saint-Georges and Gaston Monnerville, with illustrations by Joan Bacchus.
7	1969	Frederick Douglass Part 1	Bertram Fitzgerald	Howard Darden	One-page backup stories about Joseph Cinqué and Robert Smalls, with illustrations by Joan Bacchus
8	1970	Frederick Douglass Part 2	Bertram Fitzgerald	Howard Darden	Short backup story about Benjamin O. Davis Jr.
9	1970	The Life of Robert Smalls	Bertram Fitzgerald; Don Perlin	Don Perlin	
10	1970	Joseph Cinqué and the Amistad Mutiny	Joan Bacchus	Joan Bacchus	Short backup stories about the Creole case and Lynden Pindling
11	1970	Men of Action: White, Wilkins & Marshall	Bertram Fitzgerald	Ezra Jackson; Don Perlin; Tony Tallarico	Short back-up stories about James Weldon Johnson (by Jeffrey Scott) and W. E. B. Du Bois
12	1970	Black Cowboys	Don Perlin	Don Perlin	Includes stories about Nat Love, Bill Pickett, and Crawford Goldsby ("Cherokee Bill")
13	1972	Martin Luther King	Bertram Fitzgerald	Don Perlin	
14	1972	The Life of Alexander Pushkin	Warren Parker	Tony Tallarico	
15	1972	Ancient African Kingdoms	Robert Fitzgerald	Howard Darden	
16	1976	The Black Inventors Latimer and Woods	Bertram Fitzgerald	Leo Carty; Tony Tallarico	

== Legacy ==
Publisher Fitzgerald was recognized for his work in 2005 at the East Coast Black Age of Comics Convention (ECBACC), where he was given the Glyph Comics Pioneer Lifetime Achievement Award.

== See also ==
- Portrayal of black people in comics
- All-Negro Comics
- Martin Luther King and the Montgomery Story
