= Mari Evans =

American poet (1919–2017)

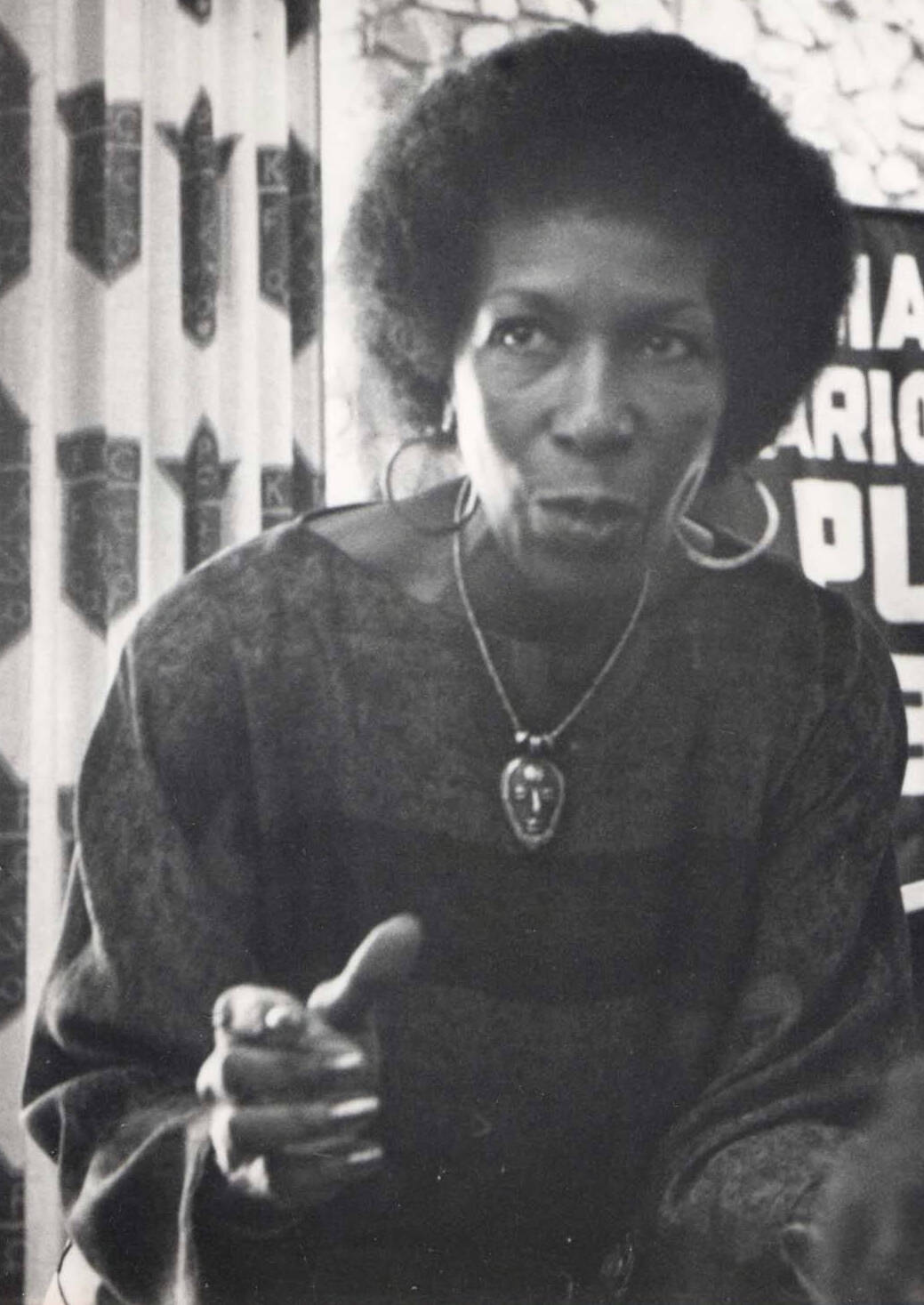
- Evans in 1985
- Born: July 16, 1919; Toledo, Ohio, U.S.
- Died: March 10, 2017 (aged 97); Indianapolis, Indiana, U.S.
- Education: University of Toledo
- Occupations: Writer; poet; teacher
- Notable work: “Line of poetry cited is from “The Silver Cell,” which is from “I Am a Black Woman,” 1970.
- Movement: Black Arts Movement

Mari Evans (July 16, 1919 – March 10, 2017) was an African-American poet, writer, and dramatist associated with the Black Arts Movement. Evans received grants and awards including a lifetime achievement award from the Indianapolis Public Library Foundation. Her poetry is known for its lyrical simplicity and the directness of its themes. She also wrote nonfiction and edited Black Women Writers (1950–1980): A Critical Evaluation (Doubleday, 1984), an important and timely critical anthology devoted to the work of 15 writers. Evans died at the age of 97 in Indianapolis, Indiana.

== Early life and education ==
Evans was born in Toledo, Ohio, on July 16, 1919, to Mary Jane Jacobs and William Reed Evans. Evans's mother died when Mari was seven years old. Evans's father strongly encouraged her to develop and cultivate her writing ability throughout her life.

Evans attended local public schools before enrolling at the University of Toledo in 1939. She majored in fashion design, but left in 1941 without earning a college degree.

== Career ==
After leaving college, Evans decided to pursue a career as a musician. This decision prompted her to move to the East Coast, where she began to collaborate with various jazz musicians, including Wes Montgomery, a native of Indianapolis, Indiana. In 1947, Evans left the East Coast and moved to Indianapolis. After she settled in the city, she worked for the Indiana Housing Authority before joining the U.S. Civil Service.

Evans gained notoriety as a poet during the 1960s and 1970s and became associated with the Black Arts Movement, an effort to explore African-American culture and history through the arts and literature. In addition to Evans, other prominent members of the movement were Amiri Baraka, Gwendolyn Brooks, Nikki Giovanni, Etheridge Knight, Haki R. Madhubuti, Larry Neal, and Sonia Sanchez, among others. Evans was also an activist interested in social justice issues and a critic of racism. As she later remarked, "From the time I was five . . . I was aware that color was an issue over which the society and I would war."

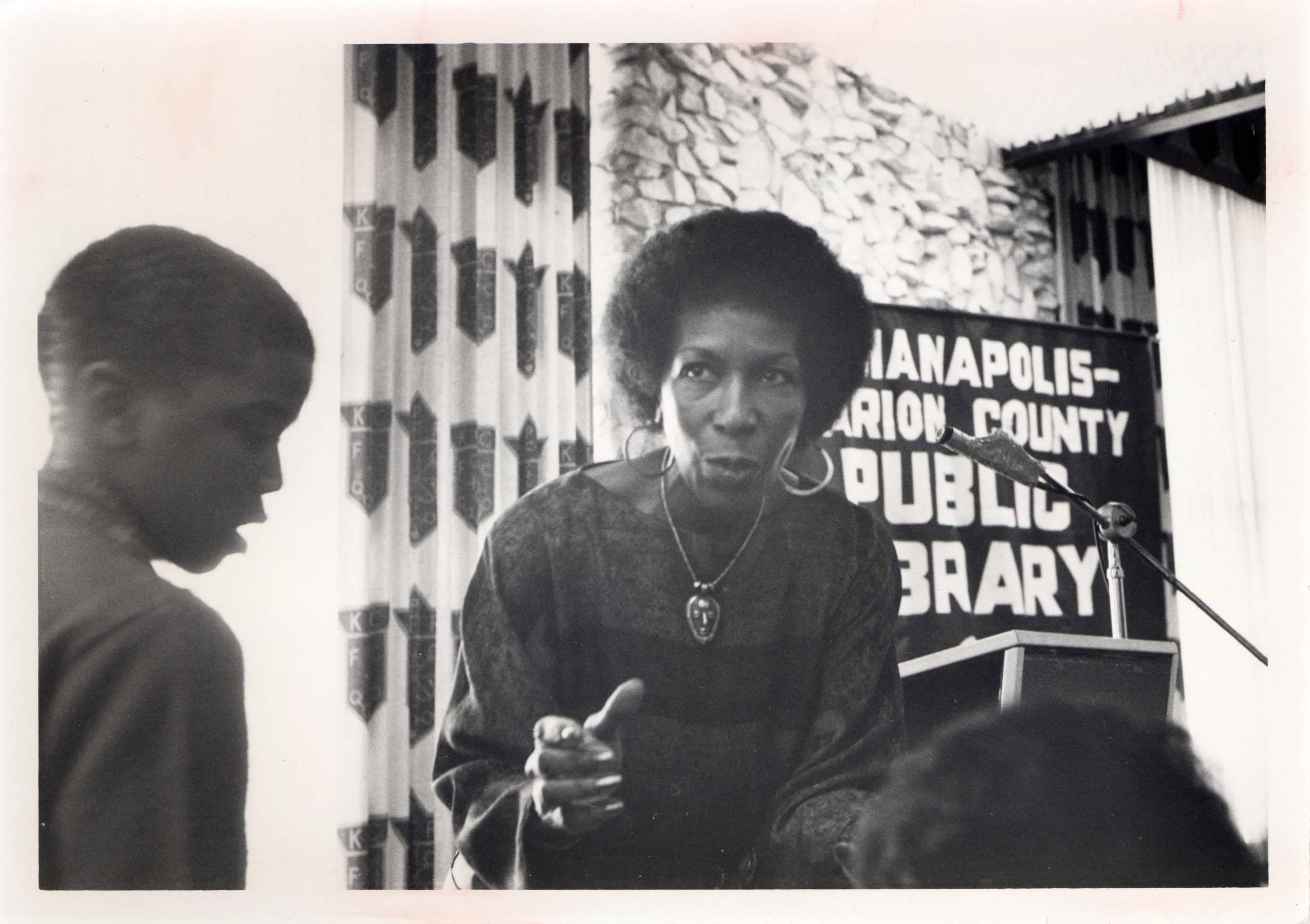
Photograph of Indianapolis poet Mari Evans at an African American History Committee event "An Afternoon with Mari Evans," held at the St. Peter Claver Center on February 17, 1985.

Evans began a series of teaching appointments in American universities in 1969. During 1969–70 she served as writer-in-residence at Indiana University – Purdue University at Indianapolis, where she taught courses in African-American literature. Evans accepted a position the following year as an assistant professor and writer-in-residence at Indiana University in Bloomington, where she taught until 1978. From 1968 to 1973, Evans produced, wrote, and directed The Black Experience, a weekly television program for WTTV in Indianapolis. Later, she explained that the program was her attempt to represent African-Americans to themselves.

In 1975 Evans received an honorary doctorate of humane letters degree from Marian College. She continued her teaching career at Purdue University (1978–80), Washington University in St. Louis (1980), Cornell University (1981–85), the State University of New York at Albany (1985–86), and Spelman College.

== Writing ==
Although her most renowned collection of poetry, I Am a Black Woman (1970), and many of her early poems preceded the Black Arts Movement, these works coincided with the Black Arts poets' messages of black cultural, psychological, and economic liberation. Themes of love, loss, loneliness, struggle, pride, and resistance are common in Evans's poetry. She also used "imagery, metaphor, and rhetoric" to describe the African-American experience, the focus of her literary work, and explained that "when I write, I write according to the title of poetry Margaret Walker's classic: 'for my people'."

Evans's writing focused primarily of the issues of race and identity. Her poems frequently featured African-American women. She also became "known for her intensity and no-nonsense candor". Although her first poetry collection, Where is All the Music?, did not attract critical acclaim, her second poetry collection, I Am a Black Woman (1970), brought her international attention and notoriety. This second collection called for social change and included her best-known individual poem, "I Am a Black Woman". Evans's other memorable poems include: "Celebration", "If There be Sorrow", "Speak the Truth to the People", "When in Rome", and "The Rebel", among others. Her later works included poetry collections, Nightstar 1973–1978 (1981), considered one of her best poetry collections, and A Dark and Splendid Mass (1992).

In her later work, Evans began to use experimental techniques and incorporate African-American idioms in ways that encouraged readers to identify with and respect the speaker. Her poems were also characterized as "realistic", "hopeful", "sometimes ironic", and enthusiastic. In her poem "Who Can Be Born Black", she concludes with the lines: "Who/ can be born/ black/ and not exhult!" In addition, Evans spoke of the need to make Blackness both beautiful and powerful. In her poem "I am a Black Woman", the final stanza reads: "I am a black woman/ tall as a cypress/ strong/ beyond all definition still/ defying place/ and time/ and circumstance/ assailed/ impervious/ indestructible/ Look on me and be/renewed." She is also well known for the line: "I have never been contained except I made the prison."

Although she is primarily known for her poetry, Evans also wrote short fiction, children's books, dramas, nonfiction articles, and essays. She also edited the "ground-breaking anthology", Black Women Writers (1950–1980): A Critical Evaluation (1984), and wrote Clarity As Concept: A Poet's Perspective (2006), a collection of essays. Evans tackled social issues in her writing, even in her children's books. Dear Corinne, Tell Somebody! Love, Annie (1999), for example, is about child abuse and "I'm Late" (2006) deals with teen pregnancy.

In 1975 Evans attended the MacDowell Colony and in 1984 she attended the Yaddo writers retreat.

== Community service ==
Mari Evans was an activist for prison reform, and was against capital punishment. She also worked with theater groups and local community organizations including Girls, Inc. of Greater Indianapolis and the Young Men's Christian Association. In addition, Evans volunteered in elementary and secondary schools.

== Personal life ==
Evans, who was divorced and the mother of two sons, led a quiet life in Indianapolis. She enjoyed playing the piano and "was a fan of the Indiana Avenue jazz scene" during the 1940s and '50s. In addition, Evans was a member of Indianapolis's Bethel African Methodist Episcopal Church, but attended Broadway United Methodist Church in her later years.

== Death and legacy ==
Evans died in Indianapolis on March 10, 2017, at the age of 97. Funeral services were held at Saint Luke's Methodist Church in Indianapolis due to the large crowd that expected to attend.

Evans was "often considered a key figure of the Black Arts Movement" and among the most influential of the twentieth century's black poets. Although she was well known in East Coast "literary circles", Evans and her poetry were not as well known in Indianapolis, where she lived for many years. A literary critic noted that Evans used "black idioms to communicate the authentic voice of the black community is a unique characteristic of her poetry." I Am a Black Woman (1970), her best-known poetry collection, won the Black Academy of Arts and Letters First Poetry Award in 1975, and includes her best-known poem, "I Am a Black Woman". Black Women Writers (1950–1980): A Critical Evaluation, a collection of more than forty essays related to the literary contributions of fifteen women writers, including Evans, is considered "an important addition" to the limited scholarly work on the subject of black women authors.

== Selected published works ==
=== Poetry ===
- Where is all the Music? (1968)
- I am a Black Woman (1970)
- Nightstar 1973–1978 (1981)
- A Dark and Splendid Mass, Harlem River Press (1992)
- Continuum, Black Classic Press (2007)

=== Children's books ===
- J.D. (1973)
- Look at Me! (1974)
- Rap Stories (1974)
- Singing Black: Alternative Nursery Rhymes for Children (1976)
- Jim Flying High (1979)
- Dear Corinne, Tell Somebody! Love, Annie: A Book About Secrets (1999)
- 'I'm Late': The Story of LaNeese and Moonlight and Alisha Who Didn't Have Anyone of Her Own, Just Us Books, (2006)

=== Dramas ===
- River of My Song (1977))
- Eyes
- Portrait of a Man (1979))
- Boochie (1979))
- The Pro (1979)
- New World (1984)

=== Nonfiction ===
- Black Women Writers (1950–1980): A Critical Evaluation, New York: Doubleday (1984)
- Black Women Writers: Arguments and Interviews, London: Pluto Press (1984))
- Clarity as Concept: A Poet's Perspective: A Collection of Essays, Chicago: Third World Press (2006)

== Awards and honors ==
- John Hay Whitney fellowship, 1965–66
- Woodrow Wilson Foundation grant, 1968
- Indiana University Writers Conference Award, 1970
- First Annual Poetry Award, Black Academy of Arts and Letters, 1970
- Honorary doctorate in humane letters from Marian College, 1975
- MacDowell Fellowship
- Copeland fellowship, Amherst College, 1980
- National Endowment for the Arts Creative Writing Award, 1981
- Featured on Ugandan postage stamp, 1997
- Grammy Award nominatee for her liner notes to The Long Road Back to Freedom: An Anthology of Black Music, 2002
- African American Legacy Project of Northwest Ohio Legend Honoree, 2007
- Indianapolis Public Library Foundation's Indiana Authors Lifetime Achievement Award, 2015
- Mural of Evans by Michael "Alkemi" Jordan was installed on an exterior wall of a building along Massachusetts Avenue in Indianapolis, 2016
