= Albidaro and the Mischievous Dream =

Book by Julius Lester

- Author: Julius Lester
- Illustrator: Jerry Pinkney
- Language: English
- Genre: Children's literature, picture book, Fable
- Published: 2000 (Fogelman Books)
- Publication place: USA
- Media type: Print (hardback)
- Pages: 32 (unpaginated)
- ISBN: 9780803719873
- OCLC: 43945182

Albidaro and the Mischievous Dream is a 2000 book by Julius Lester and illustrator Jerry Pinkney telling why teddy bears look as if they have a secret.

== Reception ==
Booklist, in a review of Albidaro and the Mischievous Dream, wrote "The guardians seem patched onto the story, and the kids' protective teddy bears are too cute and cloying. The fun here is the wild dream of rebellion, the cacophony of animals silly enough to act like people, and the satisfying return to order.". The Horn Book Magazine called it a "convoluted and unbelievable tale" and wrote "Pinkney's artwork is as lively and attractive as ever, but it doesn't rescue the poorly written story."

Albidaro and the Mischievous Dream has also been reviewed by Publishers Weekly, Kirkus Reviews, School Library Journal, and The Bulletin of the Center for Children's Books.
