= Just Us Books =

American children's book publisher

- Founded: 1988; 38 years ago
- Founders: Wade Hudson and Cheryl Willis Hudson
- Country of origin: United States
- Headquarters location: West Orange, New Jersey
- Publication types: Children and Young Adult Books
- Nonfiction topics: Diversity
- Imprints: Sankofa Books; Marimba Books
- Official website: justusbooks.com

Just Us Books is an independent children's book publisher specializing in books about African American history, culture, experiences, and multicultural themes.

== History ==
In 1987, after several commercial publishers rejected their project, Cheryl Willis Hudson and Wade Hudson self-published AFRO-BETS ABC Book, an alphabet book where the letters are shaped using the form of various Black children as cartoon characters. The original inspiration for the book came after Cheryl Hudson could not find Black images to decorate her young daughter’s bedroom. She painted her daughter’s name using figures of Black cartoon children to spell out her name. Family and friends who saw the room wanted their children’s name as well. The couple designed T-shirts and sweatshirts with the Afro-Bets characters. The garments sold 4,000 units within nine months, which then led to creating the book.

AFRO-BETS ABC Book sold 5,000 copies within three months. The Hudsons followed it with the counting book AFRO-BETS 123 Book in 1988. They also established Just Us Books that year as an independent publishing company focused on books for African American children.

The Hudsons used $7,000 from their personal savings to start the new publishing company. Wade Hudson handled marketing and business development. Cheryl Willis Hudson directed editorial and art production. During the early years, Just Us Books distribution mix consisted of 50 percent to independent bookstores, 35 percent to educational sales, and 15 percent to libraries and direct mail.

The company achieved $425,000 in sales for 1990 and by 1991 Just Us Books had seven titles and 325,000 books in print. Distribution had grown to include national retailers and bookstore chains including Barnes & Noble, B. Dalton, Waldenbooks, Brentano's, and Toys "R" Us.

By 1996, Just Us Books had more than three million books in print, an inventory of about 30 titles, and annual sales approaching $1.5 million. Its books continued to be sold through African American-owned bookstores and major US retailers including Kmart and Target.

By 2008, the company expanded its product line to include titles for young adult readers, following requests from parents asking for books for African American teenagers. Among its young adult titles was Omar Tyree's 12 Brown Boys, a collection of short stories.

== Publishing focus and approach ==
By 2018, Just Us Books was publishing about four titles a year. Publishers Weekly described it as a small press dedicated to multicultural children's books and noted the company's longstanding focus on books about Black history, culture and experiences.

By 2025, Just Us Books titles included picture books, chapter books, middle-grade books, fiction and non-fiction. AFRO-BETS ABC Book remained one of the company's bestselling titles.

== Authors and illustrators ==
Authors and illustrators whose work has been published by Just Us Books include George Ford, who illustrated Bright Eyes, Brown Skin (1990) and Jamal’s Busy Day (1991), Mari Evans, author of Singing Black: Alternative Nursery Rhymes for Children (1998) and Dear Corinne, Tell Somebody! Love, Annie (1999), Sharon M. Draper, author of the Ziggy and the Black Dinosaurs series, Loretta Long, author of Courtney’s Birthday Party (1998), Don Tate, who illustrated books in Dwayne J. Ferguson’s Kid Caramel, Private Investigator series beginning in 1996, and Kelly Starling Lyons, whose first book, NEATE: Eddie’s Ordeal, was published by Just Us Books in 2004, followed by One Million Men and Me in 2007.

== Awards and honors ==
Books published by Just Us Books have received awards and honors including:

Year	Book	Author	Illustrator	Award or honor
2008	The Secret Olivia Told Me	N. Joy	Nancy Devard	Coretta Scott King Illustrator Honor
2022	Kwame Nkrumah's Midnight Speech for Independence	Useni Eugene Perkins	Laura Freeman	Children's Africana Book Award, Best Book for Young Children

== Imprints and partnerships ==
The imprint Sankofa Books was introduced in 2004 to reissue works by African American authors that were no longer available from their original publishers. Its first release was Reflections of a Black Cowboy: Buffalo Soldiers by Robert Miller.

In 2009, Wade Hudson and Cheryl Willis Hudson, together with their children Katura and Stephan, introduced Marimba Books, a multicultural imprint created to publish children's books reflecting a broader range of cultures.

Just US Books has also collaborated with traditional children's book publishers including Abrams, Candlewick, Scholastic, and Crown Books for Young Readers. In 2018, they collaborated with Crown on We Rise, We Resist, We Raise Our Voices, an activism-focused anthology for young readers.

== Role in American children's publishing ==
The Horn Book Magazine credited Just Us Book with influencing a grassroots movement of independent publishing houses addressing underrepresentation in children’s literature.

In 2015, Just Us Books was among eleven publishers and four review journals that initially committed to participate in the inaugural Diversity Baseline Survey, an industry study created to measure diversity among book-publishing employees and book reviewers.

== See also ==
- List of publishers of children's books
- African-American book publishers in the United States, 1960–80
- Timeline of African American children's literature
- We Need Diverse Books
