= When Dad Killed Mom =

Book by Julius Lester

- First edition
- Author: Julius Lester
- Language: English
- Genre: Book; Children's Literature
- Publisher: Harcourt
- Publication date: 2001
- Publication place: United States
- Media type: Print Hardcover
- Pages: 216

Julius Lester’s When Dad Killed Mom (2001) tells, through two-first person narrative voices, the story of siblings, Jeremy age 12 and Jenna age 14, coping with the traumatic events of their mother’s murder at the alleged hands of their college psychologist father. In alternating chapters, the story unfolds, revealing that each sibling has insight into the possible motivation for the act. As the narrative unfolds, the siblings struggle to maintain order amidst their new lives. Grappling with the emotional, physical, sexual and social paradigms that resulted from their mother’s death and father’s imprisonment, Lester weaves a narrative that provides insight into the children’s new lived reality.

== Book Challenges ==
The novel was initially banned in 2002 by Wyoming’s Teton County of Education in a controversial vote by the School Board. The sexual content and genital references were cited to for the reasons that the book’s initial banning. However, not all Board members were in favor of the ban. As a result of this ban, questions were raised about the system used to identify books for banning. Library and book sellers requested a loan by permission opportunity.

== Awards ==
In the same year as the ban, Lester’s novel won selection for the Young Adult Library Services Association’s “Quick Picks for Reluctant Young Adult Readers.” As well, it was chosen for the Boston Globe/Horn Book Award and the Newbery Honor medal.
