= The Old African =

Book by Julius Lester

- First edition cover of The Old African
- Author: Julius Lester
- Illustrator: Jerry Pinkney
- Language: English
- Genre: Children's literature, picture book, US folklore
- Published: 2005 (Dial Press)
- Publication place: United States
- Media type: Print (hardback)
- Pages: 79
- ISBN: 9780803725645
- OCLC: 53375920

The Old African is a 2005 book by Julius Lester and illustrated by Jerry Pinkney. It is based on an incident at Igbo Landing and is about Jaja, a slave who leads a group of plantation slaves back to Africa by walking into the ocean.

== Reception ==
The Horn Book Magazine, in a review of The Old African, wrote "This is an eloquent visual expression of the heroism of the suffering Africans who were ensnared onto those vicious ships." and Booklist, in a starred review, wrote "Complemented by Pinkney's powerful illustrations, this picture book presents an unflinching account of the brutal history and of personal courage, told with a lyrical magic realism that draws on slave legend and the dream of freedom."

The Old African has also been reviewed by Publishers Weekly, School Library Journal, Voice of Youth Advocates, Kirkus Reviews, Africa Access Review, and The New York Times.

== Awards ==
- 2006 Children's Africana Older Children Book Award - Honor
- 2006 Massachusetts Book Award for Children's / Young Adult Literature - Honor
- 2006 Notable Book for a Global Society
