= Joan Steinau Lester =

- Joan Steinau Lester
- Born: May 28, 1940 (age 86); Asheville, North Carolina, U.S.
- Education: University of Massachusetts Amherst (doctorate in multicultural education)
- Occupations: Writer; Civil rights activist
- Spouses: Julius Lester (m. 1962–1970) Carole Johnson (m. 2008)
- Children: 2
- Writing career
- Genres: Biography; Fiction; Memoir; Essays
- Subjects: Race, gender, and family
- Notable works: Fire in My Soul; Black, White, Other: In Search of Nina Armstrong; Mama's Child; Loving Before Loving: A Marriage in Black and White
- Notable awards: National Lesbian and Gay Journalists Association award (1996); PEN Oakland Josephine Miles Literary Award (2022)
- Website: www.joanlester.com

Joan Steinau Lester (born 1940) is an American writer and civil rights activist. She co-founded the Equity Institute and has written about race, gender, and family. Her books include the biography Fire in My Soul, the novels Black, White, Other and Mama's Child, and the memoir Loving Before Loving: A Marriage in Black and White. The memoir received a 2022 PEN Oakland Josephine Miles Literary Award.

== Early life and activism ==
Lester attended Antioch College and was a member of its class of 1962. During the civil rights movement, she worked with the NAACP at Antioch, the Congress of Racial Equality in New Haven, and the Student Nonviolent Coordinating Committee in New York. She also helped organize a supermarket boycott over prices in New York.

In 1967, Lester co-founded New Women, a feminist group in New York. She represented it at a 1968 women's liberation conference. In a published essay, Lester recalled helping establish a Free School on Martha's Vineyard and later running one in Brooklyn.

== Career ==
Lester earned a doctorate in multicultural education from the University of Massachusetts Amherst. She co-founded the Equity Institute in 1981. Based first in Amherst, Massachusetts, and later in Emeryville, California, it provided organizational consulting and training on racism, sexism, and homophobia. Lester served as its executive director and later worked with the Equity Consulting Group.

=== Writing ===
Lester's essays and commentary have appeared in newspapers and magazines, and she contributed commentary to National Public Radio. Her early books were The Future of White Men and Other Diversity Dilemmas (1994), a collection of essays, and Taking Charge: Every Woman's Action Guide to Personal, Political and Professional Success (1996).

In Fire in My Soul (2003), Lester wrote an authorized biography of Eleanor Holmes Norton, whom she had met at Antioch College. The book drew on Norton's cooperation and interviews with her friends and family, and included a foreword by Coretta Scott King.

Her novel Black, White, Other: In Search of Nina Armstrong (2011) concerns a teenager's biracial identity and her family history. Her second novel, Mama's Child (2013), follows a white mother and her biracial daughter amid the civil rights and women's movements. Lester discussed the novel's structure in a 2013 interview with Shelf Awareness.

Lester's memoir Loving Before Loving: A Marriage in Black and White (2021) recounts her civil rights activism, her first marriage before the 1967 Loving v. Virginia decision, and her later life with Carole Johnson.

== Personal life ==
Lester married the writer and civil rights activist Julius Lester in 1962. They had two children, and their marriage ended in 1970. She later married Carole Johnson. In a 2021 interview, Lester recalled that she and Carole moved from New England to Berkeley in 1991. They first married during San Francisco's issuance of same-sex marriage licenses in 2004 and married again in 2008 after the earlier marriages were invalidated.

== Awards and recognition ==
Lester received a 1996 National Lesbian and Gay Journalists Association award for her National Public Radio commentary. The manuscript of Mama's Child was a Bellwether Prize finalist in 2011.

Loving Before Loving received a 2022 PEN Oakland Josephine Miles Literary Award. It was a 2021 Foreword INDIES finalist in autobiography and memoir, a nominee for the 2022 Northern California Book Awards in creative nonfiction, and a finalist for the 2022 Eric Hoffer Book Award Montaigne Medal. University of Wisconsin Press also lists it as a finalist for the 2021 Sarton Memoir Award.

== Selected works ==
- The Future of White Men and Other Diversity Dilemmas (Conari Press, 1994)
- Taking Charge: Every Woman's Action Guide to Personal, Political and Professional Success (Conari Press, 1996)
- Fire in My Soul (Atria Books, 2003)
- Black, White, Other: In Search of Nina Armstrong (Zondervan, 2011)
- Mama's Child (Atria Books, 2013)
- Loving Before Loving: A Marriage in Black and White (University of Wisconsin Press, 2021)
