= Blanche Seale Hunt =

American children's writer

- Born: March 18, 1912; Fort Myers, Florida, U.S.
- Died: April 7, 1973 (aged 61); Wellston, Oklahoma, U.S.
- Occupations: Writer, teacher, postmaster
- Spouse: Eugene A. Hunt (m. 1937; died 1981)
- Children: one son
- Writing career
- Period: 1935–1964 (as a writer)
- Genre: children's
- Notable works: Stories of Little Brown Koko; Little Brown Koko Has Fun

Signature
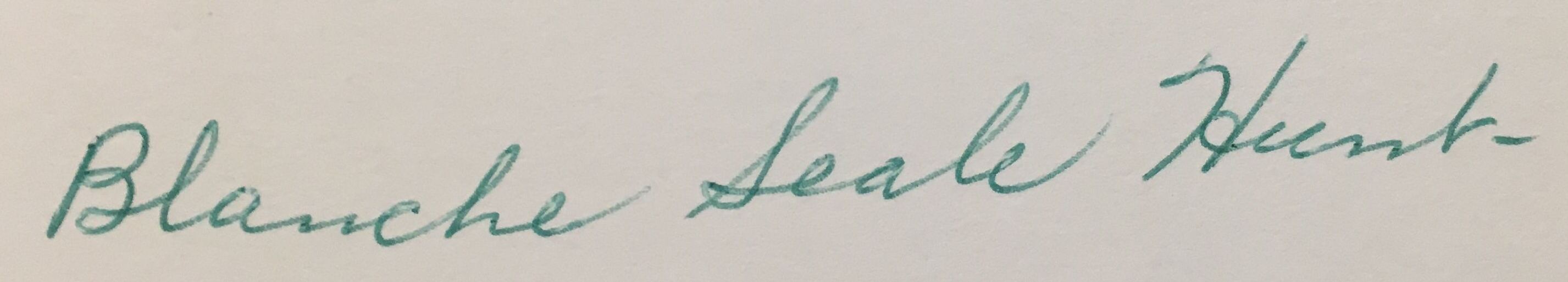

Blanche Seale Hunt (1912–1973) was the creator of the Little Brown Koko series of children stories, which initially appeared monthly in The Household Magazine for more than a decade. In full-length book form, Little Brown Koko titles sold more than 600,000 copies.

Hunt's stories drew criticism from the National Association for the Advancement of Colored People (NAACP) for their stereotypical and derogatory portrayals of Black Americans.

== Personal life ==
Blanche Seale Hunt was born in 1912 to Rufus and Pearl Dryman Seale in Fort Myers, Florida. She was two years older than her brother, Daniel. The family later relocated to Lincoln County in central Oklahoma. Hunt started teaching in 1934 and taught thirteen years at different Lincoln County school districts at Fallis, Mt. Vernon and Wellston schools.

In 1937, Hunt married Eugene A. Hunt, a fellow educator. Eugene Hunt also cultivated a commercial iris garden, offering for sale more than 150 commercial varieties. Each spring, one publication reported, hundreds would come to the Hunt home to purchase flowers and meet the author of the Little Brown Koko stories.

The Hunt home, called Koko Knoll, included a dedicated "Little Brown Koko" room with a 30" × 36" water color picture of the character by illustrator Sybil Short Fudge.

== Postmaster ==
Hunt was appointed postmaster for the Fallis Post Office, Lincoln County, Oklahoma in 1948 and served twenty one years until retirement in 1969. She also served a term as president of the Oklahoma League of Postmasters.

== Writing career ==
One of Hunt's second-grade students, Jacqueline Joy Stone, needed a story to recite for a speech contest. Hunt asked her friend, writer Beulah Rhodes Overman, to create a story, but Overman declined because she did not write for children and suggested Hunt pen a story. Hunt later recalled that "because I was writing it especially for this little girl who dearly loved stories, it came quite easily." The story was Little Brown Koko and the student won the speech contest.

Overman insisted a copy of the Little Brown Koko story be sent to The Household Magazine, a monthly magazine and mail-order publication targeting small town markets. Arthur Capper, the magazine's publisher, claimed a circulation of over 1.5 million subscribers. The story was accepted for publication and Hunt received $20. A new Little Brown Koko story appeared in each monthly issue for over a dozen years with payments to Hunt eventually increasing to $75 per story.

== Little Brown Koko ==
The characters Hunt created for the Little Brown Koko stories include Little Brown Koko, a six-year-old boy; Mammy, his mother; and his pets Shoog, a dog, and Inky-Poo, a black cat. The short stories are self-contained and typically involve Little Brown Koko getting out of a mischievous, sometimes humorous, situation. The black characters are portrayed stereotypically, speak using poor grammar and have exaggerated-sized lips and eyes.

From 1935, The Household Magazine published 197 monthly Little Brown Koko stories. Topeka, Kansas, artist Dorothy M. Wagstaff (Arens) illustrated each of the Little Brown Koko stories in Household. Wagstaff illustrated for other children's magazines such as Home Art and Wee Wisdom.

Little Brown Koko shuffles and dances through 22 lovable stories with his little dog Shoog and his good, ole, big, fat, black mammy to present thoroughly human and delightful sketches of a 6-year-old boy in the southern cotton fields in Blanche Seale Hunt's book, "Little Brown Koko."

The lazy, gluttonous Koko, with all his human faults, is a lovable little boy whose antics will amuse and delight younger readers. In fact, adults may find the Little Koko tales interesting. These stories also lend themselves nicely to reading aloud.

— The Semi-Weekly Spokesman Review, Spokane, Washington, July 1940

The stories became popular nationwide. Responding to letters from children, parents and teachers, The Household Magazine through Capper Publications, selected several Little Brown Koko stories to place in book format in 1940. Household editors also published Little Brown Koko coloring books, a mechanical bank, patterns for children's clothes, rugs, tea towels potholders, quilts, doorstops and yard fixtures. Little Brown Koko stories were read aloud during library story times and even featured on radio programs. The first two books sold 500,000 copies. Hunt received 1.25 cents royalty for each of the first two books.

In the early 1950s, a new editor at The Household Magazine repositioned the magazine from family-focused to appeal to adult women and the Little Brown Koko feature was discontinued.

Hunt contacted Benjamin "Bennie" Lee Fudge, the owner of C.E.I Publishing Company in Athens, Alabama, about publishing future Little Brown Koko books. Fudge's wife, Sybil Fudge, worked at the publishing company and recounted that "the NAACP insisted we could not publish [more Little Brown Koko books] without changes ... the spokesman for the NAACP insisted all references to black had to be changed to brown, kinky had to be changed to curly and Mammy to Mommy and in the illustrations none were to have thick lips."

Hunt selected Sybil Fudge and Jody Hawkins, of Albuquerque, New Mexico, and graduate of the Famous Artists School, to illustrate the updated collection of stories. In 1959, Little Brown Koko at Work and Play and Little Brown Koko's Pets and Playmates were published by C.E.I Publishing.

In 1964, Hunt published two volumes of Little Brown Koko Bible Stories from the Old Testaments with illustrations by Bradley Whitfield. The illustrations again featured black characters with exaggerated-sized lips and eyes. The biblical figures appear to be White and did not have distorted features.

== Context of children's literature ==
During the 1940s and 1950s, when Little Brown Koko was most popular, children's books with authentic and positive images and stories about African American children and families were rare. Modern scholarship in children's literature, specifically African American children's literature, recognizes that Little Brown Koko stories were not alone in depicting African Americans in stereotypes, with a focus on entertaining white audiences and were often cherished artifacts within families.

== Protests in Waterloo, Iowa ==
The use of Hunt's story "Little Brown Koko and the Preacher's Watermelon" in a Waterloo, Iowa, junior high school class sparked protests in 1972. Alice Margaret Hayes, a teacher at West Junior High School since 1945, read aloud the story to her speech and drama class, as she had for over a decade. The school's student body of 1,200 included 45 African American students. One of Hayes' students complained to school officials that the story was inappropriate. On May 24, twenty-five African American parents, students and community members staged a sit-in in Hayes' classroom saying that reading the story in class was "demeaning" and "racist in nature" and demanded she be dismissed. The principal agreed the Little Brown Koko story was inappropriate and suspended the teacher. The next day, white students protested the suspension and refused to attend classes. Later in the day, African American parents and students occupied the school administration building and barred the superintendent in his office until law enforcement freed him. Thirty-two protesters were arrested and charged with trespassing. On May 26, the school board rescinded the suspension, but Hayes declined to return to teach for the remainder of the school year.

== Popular culture influences ==
Little Brown Koko books sold more than 600,000 copies and were part of many children's memories in positive and negative ways. Wesley McNair, poet laureate of Maine (2011–2016), has shared fond memories of the Little Brown Koko stories his mother read to him and his siblings. He imagined he identified with Little Brown Koko because both had "mamas", no father visible in their home lives, and descriptions of "sumptuous" food McNair's family lacked. The first book McNair created was a scrapbook of Little Brown Koko short stories.

Award-winning poet Shane McCrae's 2014 Forgiveness Forgiveness explores identity, race, family and abuse through interactions with Little Brown Koko. The book's main character, a black man, finds a copy of the children's book in his grandparents' home and deals with questions of identity and race represented by Little Brown Koko.

== Bibliography ==
- Hunt, Blanche Seale (1940), Stories of Little Brown Koko, illustrated by Dorothy Wagstaff, New York: American Colortype Company, p. 96
- Hunt, Blanche Seale (1940), Little Brown Koko Has Fun, illustrated by Dorothy Wagstaff, New York: American Colortype Company, p. 96, OCLC 3641387
- Hunt, Blanche Seale (1941), Little Brown Koko Coloring Book, illustrated by Dorothy Wagstaff, Topeka, Kansas: Capper Publications, Inc.
- Cook, Marion Belden (1946), Children of the U.S.A.: Stories from the South, Blanche Seale Hunt wrote the Oklahoma story., Silver Burdett Company, p. 287, OCLC 1649194
- Hunt, Blanche Seale (1959), Little Brown Koko at Work and Play, illustrated by Sybil Fudge and Jody Hawkins, Athens, Alabama: The C.E.I. Publishing Company, p. 96, OCLC 15544790
- Hunt, Blanche Seale (1959), Little Brown Koko's Pets and Playmates, illustrated by Sybil Fudge and Jody Hawkins, Athens, Alabama: The C.E.I. Publishing Company, p. 96, OCLC 15544792
- Hunt, Blanche Seale (1964), Little Brown Koko's Bible Stories: God's Chosen People, Old Testament Book One, illustrated by Bradley Whitfield, Nashville, Tennessee: Christian Publications, Inc., p. 96, OCLC 268788581
- Hunt, Blanche Seale (1964), Little Brown Koko's Bible Stories: From Slavery to Freedom, Old Testament Book Two, illustrated by Bradley Whitfield, Nashville, Tennessee: Christian Publications, Inc., p. 96, OCLC 268788584

== Death ==
Hunt died on April 7, 1973. Her services were held at the Wellston Church of Christ, with burial at Carney Cemetery in Lincoln County, Oklahoma. Hunt was survived by her husband, Eugene, and son.

== See also ==
- Golliwogg
- Little Black Sambo
