= Jambo Means Hello =

1975 Caldecott Honor book

Jambo Means Hello: Swahili Alphabet Book
- Author: Muriel Feelings
- Illustrator: Tom Feelings
- Genre: Children's picture book
- Publisher: Dial Press
- Publication date: June 3, 1974
- Publication place: United States
- Awards: Boston Globe–Horn Book Award (1975); Caldecott Honor (1975)
- ISBN: 0140546529

Jambo Means Hello: Swahili Alphabet Book is a 1974 picture book written by Muriel Feelings and illustrated by Tom Feelings. It is an abecedarium of Swahili terms for the 24 letters in the Swahili alphabet.

Jambo Means Hello won the 1974 Boston Globe–Horn Book Award for Picture Book and was awarded a Caldecott Honor in 1975.

== Reception ==
Kirkus Reviews highlighted how "Tom Feelings' white robed figures go about their daily work and play in a softly glowing gray mist that gives their way of life a dreamily utopian quality in keeping with the author's intentions."

== Awards ==
Awards for Jambo Means Hello
Year	Award	Result	Ref.
1974	Boston Globe–Horn Book Award for Picture Book	Winner	
1975	Caldecott Medal	Honor	
1982	National Book Award for Children's Books, Picture Books	Finalist	
