= John Clapp (artist) =

Visual artist

John Clapp is a visual artist from the San Francisco Bay Area. He was educated at Art Center College of Design in Pasadena, California, and is a professor in the School of Art & Design at San Jose State University in San Jose, California.

== Bibliography ==
As of 2006, Clapp has illustrated five books for children.

- The Stone Fey by Robin McKinley, Harcourt Brace & Company, 1998. ISBN 0-15-200017-8
- Right Here on This Spot by Sharon Hart Addy, Houghton Mifflin Company, 1999. ISBN 0-395-73091-0
- The Prince of Butterflies by Bruce Coville, Harcourt Brace & Company, 2002. ISBN 0-15-201454-3.
- On Christmas Eve by Liz Rosenberg, Roaring Brook Press, 2002. ISBN 0-7613-1627-2.
- Shining by Julius Lester, Silver Whistle, 2003. ISBN 0-15-200773-3.
