= Muriel Feelings =

American children's book author (1938–2011)

- Born: Muriel Grey; July 31, 1938; Philadelphia, Pennsylvania, U.S.
- Died: September 29, 2011 (aged 73); Philadelphia, Pennsylvania, U.S.
- Education: Pennsylvania Museum and School of Industrial Art; Los Angeles State College
- Spouse: Tom Feelings (m. 1969; divorced in 1974)
- Writing career
- Notable works: Moja Means One: A Swahili Counting Book (1971); Jambo Means Hello: A Swahili Alphabet Book (1974)

Muriel Feelings (July 31, 1938 – September 29, 2011) was an American children's book author. She is known for her collaborations with her illustrator husband Tom Feelings. The two produced the books Moja Means One: A Swahili Counting Book (1971) and Jambo Means Hello: A Swahili Alphabet Book (1974). Their notable books are considered part of rise of the Afrocentric literature in the 1970s.

== Biography ==
Muriel Feelings, née Grey, was born on July 31, 1938, in Philadelphia, Pennsylvania. She attended the Pennsylvania Museum and School of Industrial Art and Los Angeles State College. She became a member of the Organization of Afro-American Unity and in 1966 traveled to Uganda, where she taught for several years.

She returned to the United States and in 1969 married the illustrator Tom Feelings. In 1970, the couple collaborated on their first book Zamani Goes to Market. The couple then moved to Guyana. While there, the couple created their books Moja Means One: A Swahili Counting Book and Jambo Means Hello: Swahili Alphabet Book. Moja Means One was awarded a Caldecott Honor in 1972. Jambo Means Hello won the 1974 Boston Globe–Horn Book Award for Picture Book, and was awarded a Caldecott Honor in 1975.

The couple divorced in 1974. Feelings died on September 29, 2011, in Philadelphia.
