= John W. Cooper =

American ventriloquist and entertainer (1873–1966)

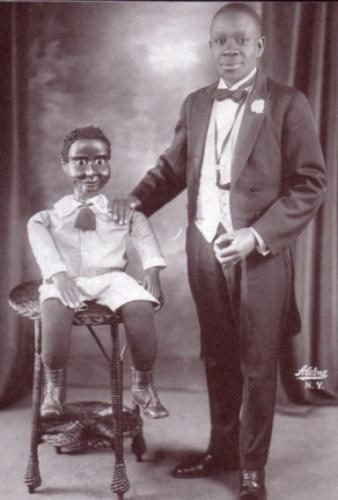
John W. Cooper circa 1900

John Walcott Cooper Jr. (February 17, 1873 – April 1966) was an African-American ventriloquist and singer with the Southern Jubilee Singers. He was known as the "Black Napoleon of Ventriloquism" and also performed under the pseudonym Hezekiah Jones. Over the course of his lifetime Cooper was a member of the Negro Actors Guild of America, the Colored Vaudeville Benevolent Association, and the International Brotherhood of Ventriloquists.

== Biography ==
=== Early years ===
He was born in 1873 in Brooklyn to John Walcott Cooper Sr. and Annie Morris. His parents originally lived in the southern part of the United States; John Cooper Sr. was originally from Beaufort, South Carolina, and Annie Morris was originally from Georgia. In 1871, the family moved north.

Cooper dropped out of school in the third grade at age 8, in 1881. Before his 13th birthday, in 1886, both of Cooper's parents died. Cooper took on a job as an exercise boy at Sheepshead Bay Race Track in Brooklyn. While working at Sheepshead Bay Race Track, Cooper was introduced to ventriloquism by a white ventriloquist who attempted to convince and frighten Cooper into believing that the horses he was working with could talk. This was one of the various examples that many speculate prompted Cooper to become a ventriloquist.

=== Career ===
John W. Cooper began his career in 1886 with the Southern Jubilee Singers, touring parts of New England, Canada, and the Mid-Atlantic States for four years. While he toured with the Southern Jubilee Singers, he began to formulate his ventriloquism act. Cooper wrote and performed his pieces in front of predominantly white audiences.

In 1900–01, Cooper joined Richards and Pringles Georgia Minstrels. Unlike the other minstrel performers in the group, Cooper performed as a ventriloquist and did not wear blackface as part of their act. The minstrels, an act that got its start in the 1830s before vaudeville and burlesque, typically participated in an overtly racist style of performance known as blackfacing in which the singers and dancers would paint their faces with black cosmetics that mocked African Americans. Cooper essentially performed in minstrel shows but was not a minstrel himself and introduced a performance style that contrasted blackfacing. After touring with Richards and Pringles Georgia Minstrels, he became known as “the Black Napoleon of ventriloquism.” He then joined Rusco and Holland's Big Minstrel Festival at the end of 1901.

In 1902, Cooper participated in independent performances. One of his most famous acts was "Fun in a Barber Shop". This act involved five different puppet characters where Cooper portrayed each one in different voices. It was a scene that took place in a barbershop for whites with black employees. Cooper operated all five dummies and the projection of six voices. The extra voice was his, as he also had a role in the performance. In this scene, he multitasked by one of the dummies "cut the customer's hair" with his hands while using his feet to operate the other dummies. Two of the dummies were customers who talked while waiting their turn as well as a manicurist who sang while doing the fifth dummy's nails.

=== The White Rats ===
Cooper's break into the vaudeville circuit came as a result of a white vaudeville union's strike in 1901. The White Rats, the notorious name for the white vaudeville union, was facing administrative issues where performers could not reach any sort of negotiation with their managers in the heavily monopolized business.

In the meantime, Cooper ignored the strike and in the desperate need for talent during the strike, he became a fixture on the vaudeville circuit. This led to performances on many radio shows throughout the rest of his life including weekly performances while touring with the troupe "The Major Bowes Original Amateur Hour".

=== Father Quinn’s entertainers ===
During the 1920s, Cooper was the lead performer in a group of five performers called Father Quinn's Entertainers, named for the famed Brooklyn priest Bernard J. Quinn. Throughout this decade, they toured Catholic churches in the United States. By the 1930s, a decline in the popularity of Vaudeville occurred. After twenty years of performing in clubs, halls, and theaters, Cooper began to tour alone with his dummy named Sam Jackson. For the rest of his career, he and Sam provided entertainment to children in the homes of wealthy patrons and in the hospitals of New York City. In 1960, at the age of 86, Cooper retired from show business.

=== Sam Jackson ===
Through the later part of his vaudeville days in the 1930s, parts of Cooper's act featured his dummy Sam Jackson. Often claiming Sam was a "cousin" of Charlie McCarthy, the famous dummy of Edgar Bergen, background research performed as part of a PBS series discovered that both McCarthy and Jackson were made by Theodore Mack, a prominent puppet maker from Chicago.

The puppet also had a variety of fairly large features such as enlarged eyes. Dummies featured large features because audiences would be packed into large theaters and the enlarged features allowed audiences from as far back as the balcony to enjoy the show.

John W. Cooper, now under the alias Hezikiah Jones, and Sam toured the country with The Major Bowes Original Amateur Hour. A few years later during World War II, Cooper and Sam independently performed in veterans hospitals as well as in the USO camp shows across the country. Alongside this, they made appearances at private parties and nightclubs including the well-known Kit-Kat and El Morocco clubs in New York City.

=== Death ===
He died in April 1966 in Brooklyn.

== Personal life ==
Cooper was a devout Catholic convert and a member of St. Peter Claver Catholic Church in Brooklyn.

== Legacy ==
Because dummies like Cooper's Sam Jackson were used so often, it was not uncommon that performers would replace them with new figures. John W. Cooper's late daughter, Joan Maynard (preservationist), was the custodian of Sam Jackson. In order to promote his legacy, Maynard set up exhibits about her father at the Brooklyn Historical Society. A series of documents and files containing genealogical information as well as letters sent to John W. Cooper during his career are parts of the exhibits. There are also various scripts and writings by Cooper relaying a dialogue between him and Sam.
