= Joan Maynard (preservationist) =

American artist and preservationist

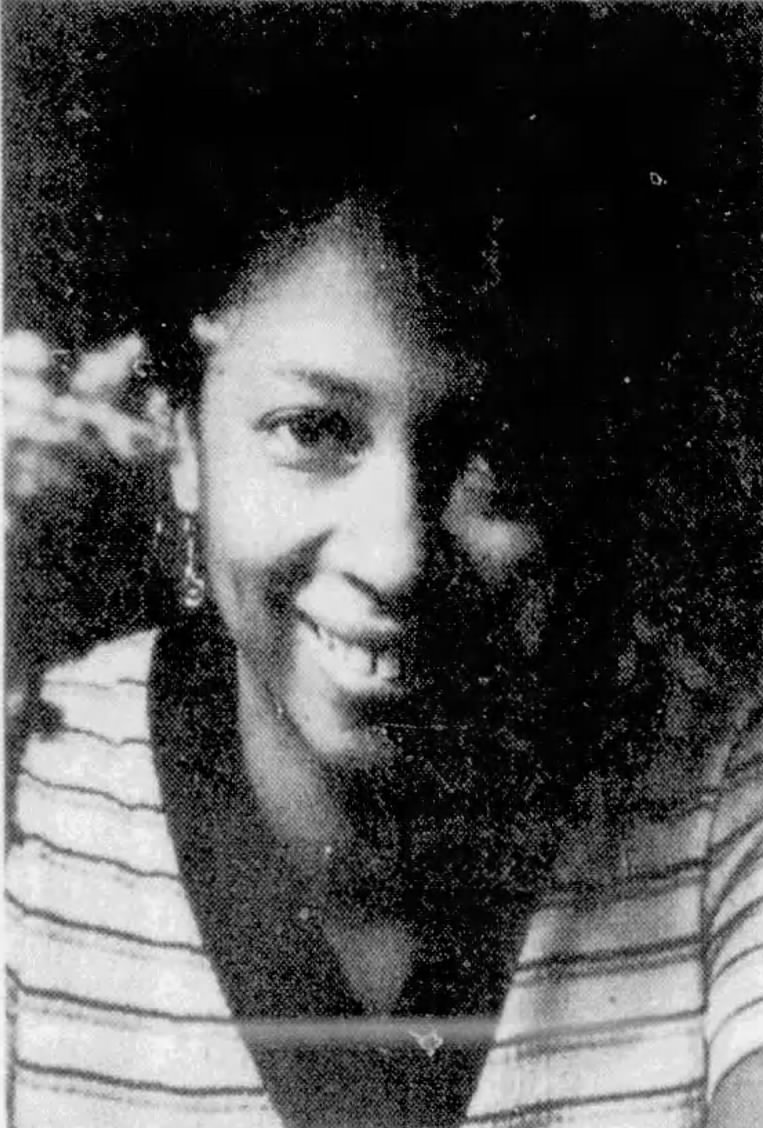
- Maynard c. 1977
- Born: Joan Bacchus Cooper; August 29, 1928; Brooklyn, New York
- Died: January 22, 2006 (aged 77)
- Other name: Joan Bacchus
- Education: Empire State College of the State University of New York
- Occupations: Artist, Community organizer & preservationists

Joan Bacchus Maynard (née Cooper; August 29, 1928 − January 22, 2006) was an American artist, author, community organizer, and preservationist. She was one of the founding members of a late 1960s grassroots group to preserve the legacy of Weeksville, a pre-Civil War African American community in Brooklyn, New York.

== Early life ==
Maynard was born in Brooklyn, New York. She attended Bishop McDonnell Memorial High. Her father was John W. Cooper, a ventriloquist. Her mother, Julia St. Bernard, was from the Caribbean island of Grenada. She received a scholarship to attend the Art Career School in Manhattan. She graduated from Empire State College. She was a Revson Fellow at Columbia University.

== Career ==
Maynard was a cover artist for The Crisis magazine, the official magazine of the National Association for the Advancement of Colored People.

She was awarded an honorary doctorate from the Bank Street College of Education.

In 1966, Maynard (as Joan Bacchus) was a writer and artist for the Golden Legacy comic series started by Bertram Fitzgerald. She worked with Tom Feelings on the Saga of Harriet Tubman volume. She also wrote and pencilled issues about Matthew Henson, Joseph Cinqué, and La Amistad mutiny.

=== Weeksville ===
Weeksville was a community of escaped slaves and free blacks which was founded in the 1830s. The free blacks owned property, which made black males eligible to vote. The community lasted for nearly a century. Members of the founding grassroots preservation group were Maynard, James Hurley, Dewey Harley, Dolores McCullough, and Patricia Johnson.

Maynard later became the director of the Society for the Preservation of Weeksville and Bedford Stuyvesant. It later became Weeksville Heritage Center. She was involved in the preservation of Weeksville for over 25 years, to restore the legacy which was missing from maps of the area.

Maynard and Gwen Cottman co-authored and published Weeksville, Then & Now: The Search to Discover, the Effort to Preserve, Memories of Self in Brooklyn, New York.

From 1972 to 1974, Maynard was President of the Society of the Preservation of Weeksville and Bedford Stuyvesant. From 1974 to 1999, she was Executive Director of the Weeksville Heritage Society.

In October 2017, Brooklyn City Councilman Robert Cornegy and Weeksville trustees named a block of Buffalo Avenue in honor the legacy of Maynard.

== Awards ==
Maynard received a Louise DuPont Crowninshield Award from the National Trust for Historic Preservation. She was awarded an honorary doctorate from the Bank Street College of Education.
