= Julius Lester =

American author, photographer and educator (1939–2018)

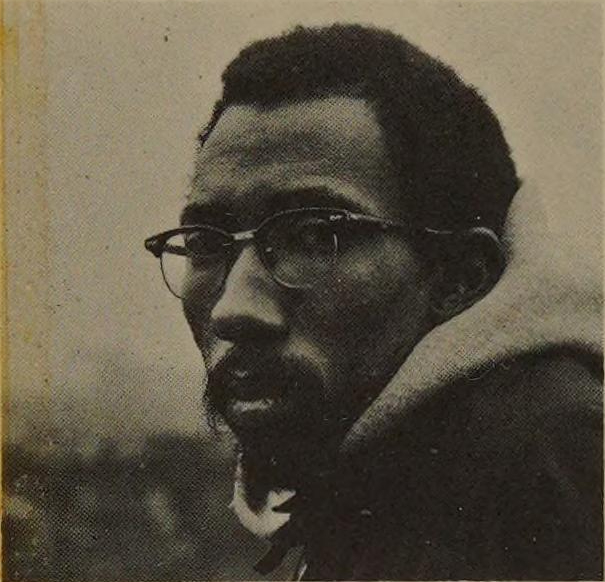
- Portrait from the first edition of To Be a Slave (1968; photo by David Gahr)
- Born: Julius Bernard Lester; January 27, 1939; St. Louis, Missouri, U.S.
- Died: January 18, 2018 (aged 78); Palmer, Massachusetts, U.S.
- Education: Fisk University (BA)
- Occupations: Author; musician; photographer; professor
- Spouses: Joan Steinau (m. 1962; div. 1970) Alida Carolyn Fechner (m. 1979; div. 1991) Milan Sabatini (m. 1995)

Julius Bernard Lester (January 27, 1939 – January 18, 2018) was an American writer of books for children and adults and an academic who taught for 32 years (1971–2003) at the University of Massachusetts Amherst. Lester was also a civil rights activist, a photographer, and a musician who recorded two albums of folk music and original songs.

== Early life and family ==
Born on January 27, 1939, St. Louis, Missouri, Julius Lester was the son of W. D. Lester, a Methodist minister, and Julia (Smith) Lester. In 1941, the family moved to Kansas City, Kansas, and then to Nashville, Tennessee, in 1952. He also spent his summers with his grandmother on her farm in Pine Bluff, Arkansas. In 1960 he received his BA from Fisk University in Nashville, Tennessee, with a major in English and minors in Art and Spanish.

In 1961 he moved to New York City where he was a folk singer and a photographer for the Student Nonviolent Coordinating Committee.

Lester married Joan Steinau in 1962. They had two children, Jody Simone (1965) and Malcolm Coltrane (1967). They divorced in 1970. In 1979 he married Alida Carolyn Fechner, who had a daughter, Elena Milad. Fechner and Lester had a son together named David Julius. They divorced in 1991. He married Milan Sabatini in 1995. His stepdaughter from this marriage is Lián Amaris.

== Civil rights years ==
During college, Lester became involved in the Student Nonviolent Coordinating Committee (SNCC). Among his major efforts in those years was participation in the 1964 Mississippi Summer Project. His experiences during "Freedom Summer" were documented in a 2014 documentary The Folk Singer, which aired as part of the American Experience series on PBS. Lester also traveled to North Vietnam with SNCC to photograph and write about the damage caused by U.S. bombing missions there.

During his New York years, Lester hosted Uncle Tom's Cabin, a radio show on WBAI-FM (1968–75); and co-hosted (with Jonathan Black) Free Time, a television show on WNET-NY (Channel 13), for two years. He taught guitar and banjo and worked as a folk singer "singing at rallies, and hootenannies and fundraising events in New York for SNCC." He recorded two albums of traditional and original songs for Vanguard Records: Julius Lester (1966) and Departures (1967). And he performed on the coffeehouse circuit. A compilation of songs from both albums was released on a CD, Dressed Like Freedom, on Ace Records in 2007.

Lester's 1966 essay "The Angry Children of Malcolm X," is considered one of the definitive African-American statements of its era. As his reputation grew, Lester wrote Look Out, Whitey! Black Power's Gon' Get Your Mama! (Dial, 1968), which he characterized as the "first book about the black power movement by someone inside the black power movement".

== Conversion to Judaism ==
In 1982, Lester converted to Judaism. He has said that his conversion journey began when he was seven and learned that his maternal great-grandfather, Adolph Altschul, was a Jewish immigrant from Germany, who married a freed slave. He adopted the Hebrew name Yaakov Daniel ben Avraham v’Sarah. He was a leader of the Beth El Synagogue in St. Johnsbury, Vermont, from 1991 to 2001.

== Academic career ==
From 1968 to 1970, alongside his activities as a radio host in New York, Lester taught Afro-American history at the New School for Social Research. In 1971 he began teaching at the University of Massachusetts Amherst as a visiting lecturer in the Afro-American Studies department; he became an associate professor in the department in 1975 and a full professor in 1977.

In 1988, Lester came into conflict with his colleagues in the Afro-American Studies department upon the publication of his book Lovesong, which chronicles his conversion to Judaism. In the book he refers to a lecture at the university by the author James Baldwin several years earlier, and characterizes certain remarks that Baldwin made as antisemitic. In March 1988, in a unanimous step, the Afro-American Studies faculty wrote a letter to the university administration recommending that Lester be reassigned to a different department. Following negotiations that involved the chancellor of the university, the dean of the faculty, and Lester himself, Lester transferred to the Judaic and Near Eastern Studies department (where he had held a joint appointment since 1982), and remained there for the rest of his university career, until his retirement at the end of 2003.

During his 32 years at the university, Lester taught courses in five departments: Comparative Literature ("Black and White Southern Fiction"), English ("Religion in Western Literature"), Afro-American Studies ("The Writings of W. E. B. Du Bois"), ("Writings of James Baldwin"), ("Literature of the Harlem Renaissance"), ("Blacks and Jews: A Comparative Study"), and Judaic Studies ("Biblical Tales and Legends") and ("The Writings of Elie Wiesel"), History ("Social Change and the 1960s"), one of the university's largest and most popular courses.

Lester was awarded all three of the university's most prestigious faculty awards: the Distinguished Teacher's Award, the Faculty Fellowship Award for Distinguished Research and Scholarship, and the Chancellor's Medal, the university's highest honor. The Council for Advancement and Support of Education selected him as the Massachusetts State Professor of the Year 1986.

=== Creative endeavors ===
In addition to performing songs and recording albums, Lester wrote eight nonfiction books, 31 children's books, one book of poetry and photographs (with David Gahr), and three adult novels. His first book was an instructional guide to playing the 12-string guitar, co-authored with Pete Seeger. Among the awards his books received were the Newbery Honor, Boston Globe-Horn Book Award, Coretta Scott King Award, National Book Award finalist, ALA Notable Book, National Jewish Book Award finalist, National Book Critics Circle Honor Book, and the New York Times Outstanding Book Award. His books have been translated into eight languages.

He published more than 200 essays and book and film reviews for such publications as The New York Times Book Review, The New York Times Op-Ed page, The Boston Globe, Village Voice, The New Republic, Sing Out!, Moment, Forward and Dissent.

His photographs have been included in an exhibit of images from the civil rights movement at the Smithsonian Institution. He had solo shows at the University of Massachusetts Student Union Gallery, the Forbes Library, Northampton, Mass., Valley Photo Center, Springfield, Mass., and the Robert Floyd Photography Gallery, Southampton, Mass.

Lester's work was included in the 2025 exhibition Photography and the Black Arts Movement, 1955–1985 at the National Gallery of Art.

=== Death ===
Lester died of complications from chronic obstructive pulmonary disease (COPD) on January 18, 2018, after a brief hospitalization.

== Written works ==
- The Folksinger's Guide to the 12-String Guitar as Played by Leadbelly, Lester and Pete Seeger (1965)
- Look Out, Whitey! Black Power Gon' Get Your Mama (1968)
- To Be a Slave (1968)
- Search for the New Land (1969)
- Revolutionary Notes (1969)
- Black Folktales (1969)
- The Seventh Son: The Thoughts and Writings of W. E. B. DuBois (1971)
- Two Love Stories (1972)
- Long Journey Home: Stories from Black History (1972)
- The Knee-High Man and Other Tales, illustrations by Ralph Pinto (1972)
- Who I Am, photographs by David Gahr (1974)
- All Is Well (1976)
- This Strange New Feeling (1982)
- Do Lord Remember Me (1984)
- The Tales of Uncle Remus: The Adventures of Brer Rabbit, illus. Jerry Pinkney (1987)
- Lovesong: Becoming a Jew (1988)
- More Tales of Uncle Remus: Further Adventures of Brer Rabbit, His Friends, Enemies, and Others, illus. Jerry Pinkney (1988)
- How Many Spots Does a Leopard Have? And Other Tales, illus. David Shannon (1989)
- Further Tales of Uncle Remus: The Misadventures of Brer Rabbit, Brer Fox, Brer Wolf, the Doodang, and Other Creatures, illus. Jerry Pinkney (1990)
- Falling Pieces of the Broken Sky (1990)
- The Last Tales of Uncle Remus, illus. Jerry Pinkney (1994)
- The Man Who Knew Too Much, illus. Leonard Jenkins (1994)
- And All Our Wounds Forgiven (1994)
- John Henry, illus. Jerry Pinkney (1994)
- Othello: A Novel (1995)
- Sam and the Tigers, illus. Jerry Pinkney (1996)
- From Slaveship to Freedom Road, paintings by Rod Brown (1998)
- Black Cowboy, Wild Horses: A True Story, illus. Jerry Pinkney (1998)
- What a Truly Cool World, illus. Joe Cepeda (1999)
- When the Beginning Began, illus. Emily Lisker (1999)
- Albidaro and the Mischievous Dream, illus. Jerry Pinkney (2000)
- Pharaoh's Daughter: A Novel (2000)
- The Blues Singers: Ten Who Rocker the World, illus. Lisa Cohen (2001)
- When Dad Killed Mom (2001)
- Ackamarackus: Julius Lester's Sumptuously Silly Fantastically Funny Fables, illus. Emilie Chollat (2001)
- Why Heaven Is Far Away, illus. Joe Cependa (2002)
- Shining, illus. John Clapp (2003)
- The Autobiography of God (2004)
- Let's Talk About Race, illus. Karen Barbour (2005)
- On Writing for Children and Other People (2005)
- Day of Tears: A Novel in Dialogue (2005)
- The Old African, illus. Jerry Pinkney (2005)
- Time's Memory (2006)
- Cupid: A Novel (2007)
- Guardian (2008)
- The Hungry Ghosts (2009)
- The Girl Who Saved Yesterday (2016)

== Awards ==
=== Book awards ===
- Newbery Honor, 1969, and Lewis Carroll Shelf Award, 1971, both for To Be a Slave
- Lewis Carroll Shelf Award, 1972, and National Book Award finalist, 1973, both for The Long Journey Home: Stories from Black History
- Lewis Carroll Shelf Award, 1973, for The Knee-high Man and Other Tales
- Coretta Scott King Honor, 1983, for This Strange New Feeling, and 1988, for Tales of Uncle Remus: The Adventures of Brer Rabbit
- Parents' Choice Story Book award, 1987, for The Tales of Uncle Remus, and 1990, for Further Tales of Uncle Remus
- Reading Magic Award, 1988, for More Tales of Uncle Remus
- Boston Globe–Horn Book Award, American Library Association Notable Book, and Caldecott Honor, 1995, for John Henry
- ALA Notable Book, 1996, for Sam and the Tigers: A New Telling of Little Black Sambo, illustrated by Jerry Pinkney – runner-up for the 2016 Phoenix Picture Book Award
- Coretta Scott King Award, 2006, for Day of Tears: A Novel in Dialogue

=== Other awards ===
- Distinguished Teacher's Award, 1983–84
- Faculty Fellowship Award for Distinguished Research and Scholarship, 1985
- National Professor of the Year Silver Medal Award, Council for Advancement and Support of Education, 1985
- Massachusetts State Professor of the Year and Gold Medal Award for National Professor of the Year, Council for Advancement and Support of Education, both 1986
- Distinguished Faculty Lecturer, 1986–87.
