= Granville Woods =

American inventor (1856–1910)

Granville Tailer Woods
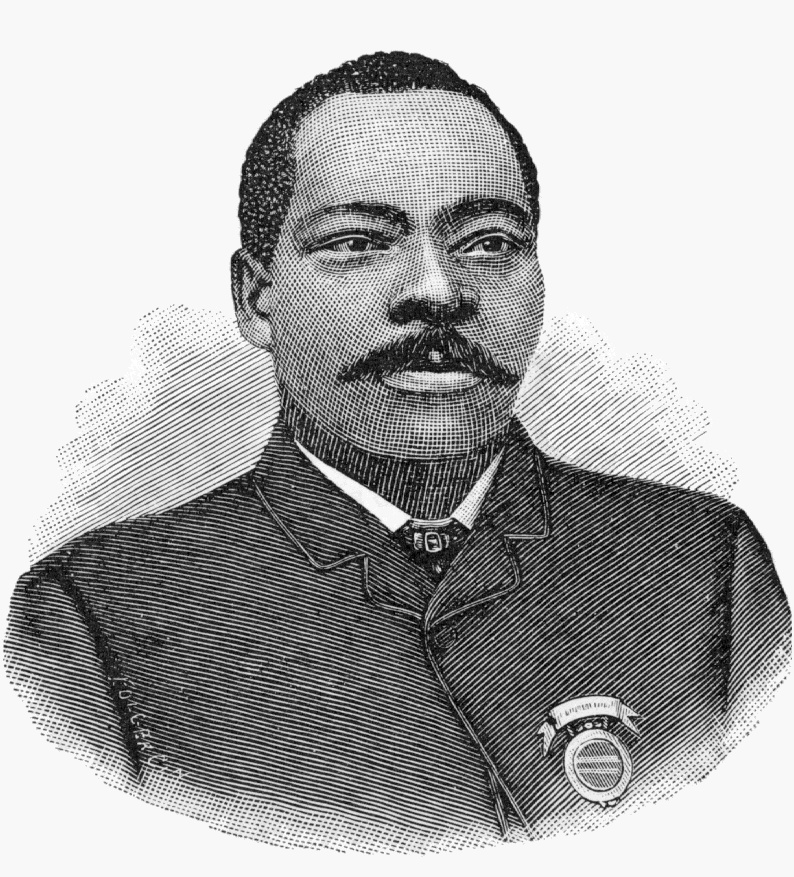
- Illustration of Woods, c. 1887
- Born: April 23, 1856; Columbus, Ohio, United States
- Died: January 30, 1910 (aged 53); New York City, United States
- Resting place: St. Michael's (Episcopalian) Cemetery, East Elmhurst, New York
- Occupation: Inventor

Granville Tailer Woods (April 23, 1856 – January 30, 1910) was an American inventor who held more than 50 patents in the United States. He was the first African American mechanical and electrical engineer after the Civil War. Self-taught, he concentrated most of his work on trains and streetcars. One of his inventions is the Synchronous Multiplex Railway Telegraph, a variation of the induction telegraph that relied on ambient static electricity from existing telegraph lines to send messages between train stations and moving trains.

Granville T. Woods invented and patented Tunnel Construction for the electric railroad system, electrical rollercoasters.

== Early life ==
Granville T. Woods was born to Martha J. Brown and Cyrus Woods. He had a brother named Lyates and a sister named Rachel. His mother was part Native American, and his father was African American. Granville attended school in Columbus, Ohio, until age 10 but had to leave due to his family's poverty, which meant he needed to work. He served an apprenticeship in a machine shop and learned the trades of machinist and blacksmith. Some sources of his day asserted that he also received two years of college-level training in "electrical and mechanical engineering", but little is known about where he might have studied.

== Career ==
In 1872, Woods obtained a job as a fireman on the Danville and Southern Railroad in Missouri. He eventually became an engineer and in December 1874, moved to Springfield, Illinois, where he worked at a rolling mill, the Springfield Iron Works. He studied mechanical and electrical engineering in college from 1876 to 1878.

In 1878, he took a job aboard the steamer "Ironsides" and became chief engineer within two years. When he returned to Ohio, he became an engineer with the Dayton and Southwestern Railroad in Ohio. He moved to Cincinnati, Ohio in 1880, and established his own business as an electrical engineer and inventor. After receiving the multiplex telegraph patent, he reorganized his Cincinnati company as the Woods Electric Co.

In 1892, he moved his research operations to New York City, where he was joined by his brother, Lyates Woods, who also had several inventions.

== Inventions ==
Over the course of his lifetime, Granville Woods obtained more than 50 patents for his inventions, including an automatic brake and an egg incubator, and for improvements to other technologies, such as the safety circuit, telegraph, telephone, and phonograph.

In 1884, Woods received his first patent, for a steam boiler furnace. In 1885, Woods patented an apparatus that was a combination of a telephone and a telegraph. The device, which he called "telegraphony", would allow a telegraph station to send voice and telegraph messages through Morse code over a single wire. He sold the rights to this device to the American Bell Telephone Company. In 1887, he patented the Synchronous Multiplex Railway Telegraph, which allowed communications between train stations and moving trains by creating a magnetic field around a coiled wire under the train. Woods caught smallpox prior to patenting the technology, and so Lucius Phelps (Note: Lucius Joshua Phelps is the father of Earle B. Phelps (1876—1953), the American chemist, bacteriologist and sanitation expert.) patented it first in 1884. In 1887, Woods used notes, sketches, and a working model of the invention to secure the patent. The invention was so successful that Woods began the Woods Electric Company in Cincinnati, Ohio, to market and sell his patents. However, the company quickly became devoted to invention creation until it was dissolved in 1893. Thomas Edison later filed a claim to the ownership of the induction telegraph patent, stating that he had first created a similar telegraph and that he was entitled to the patent for the device. Woods often had difficulties in enjoying his success as other inventors made claims to his devices. Woods was twice successful in defending himself, proving that there were no other devices upon which he could have depended or relied upon to make his device. After Thomas Edison's second defeat, he decided to offer Granville Woods a position with the Edison Company, but Woods declined.

In 1888, Woods manufactured a system of overhead electric conducting lines for railroads modeled after the system pioneered by Charles van Depoele, a famed inventor who had by then installed his electric railway system in thirteen United States cities.

Following the Great Blizzard of 1888, New York City Mayor Hugh J. Grant declared that all wires, many of which powered the above-ground rail system, had to be removed and buried, emphasizing the need for an underground system. Woods' patent built upon previous third rail systems, improving the safety by using wire brushes to make connections with metallic terminal heads, without exposing wires by installing electrical contactor rails. Once the train car had passed over, the wires were no longer live, reducing the risk of injury. It was successfully tested in February 1892 in Coney Island on the Figure Eight Roller Coaster. It is often stated that Woods invented underground third rail systems - this is false, as many other inventors were active in the field at the time and Woods ultimately simply made small contributions.

Later that year, he was arrested and charged with libel after taking out an advertisement in a trade magazine warning against patronizing the American Engineering Company of New York City. The company had provided funds for Woods to market the invention, but a crucial component of the invention was missing from the deal, which the manager of the company, James Slough Zerbe, later stole. A jury acquitted Woods, but Zerbe had already patented a version of the design, which was valued at $1 million, in Europe. Woods patented the invention in 1893, and in 1901, he sold it to General Electric.

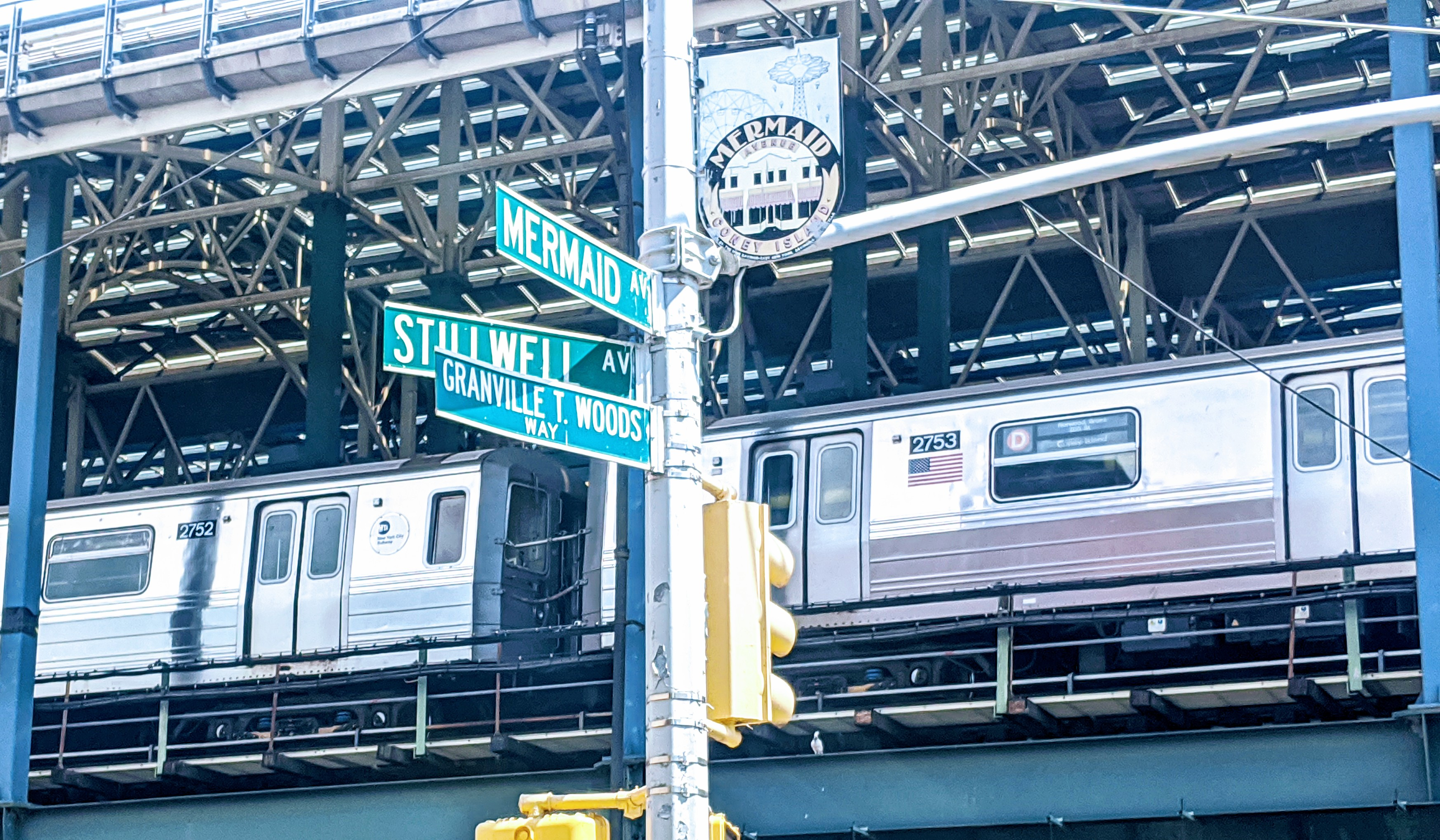
Woods improved the Westinghouse air brake and subway tunnels

In 1896, Woods created a system for controlling electrical lights in theaters, known as the "safety dimmer", which was economical, safe, and efficient, saving 40% of electricity use.

Woods is also sometimes credited with the invention of the air brake for trains in 1904; however, George Westinghouse had patented the air brake almost 40 years earlier, making Woods' contribution an improvement to the invention.

== Personal life ==
Although the newspapers of his day generally referred to him as a bachelor, Woods was married to Ada Woods; however, she was granted a divorce from him in 1891.

In 1902, the Kansas City American Citizen described Woods as an articulate, well-spoken man who was meticulous in his style of clothing and preferred to dress in black. At times, he would refer to himself as an immigrant from Australia, in the belief that he would be given more respect if people thought he was from a foreign country, as opposed to African American. In his day, Black newspapers frequently expressed their pride in his achievements, saying he was "the greatest of Negro inventors", and referring to him as "professor" despite his lack of such a college education.

== Death and legacy ==
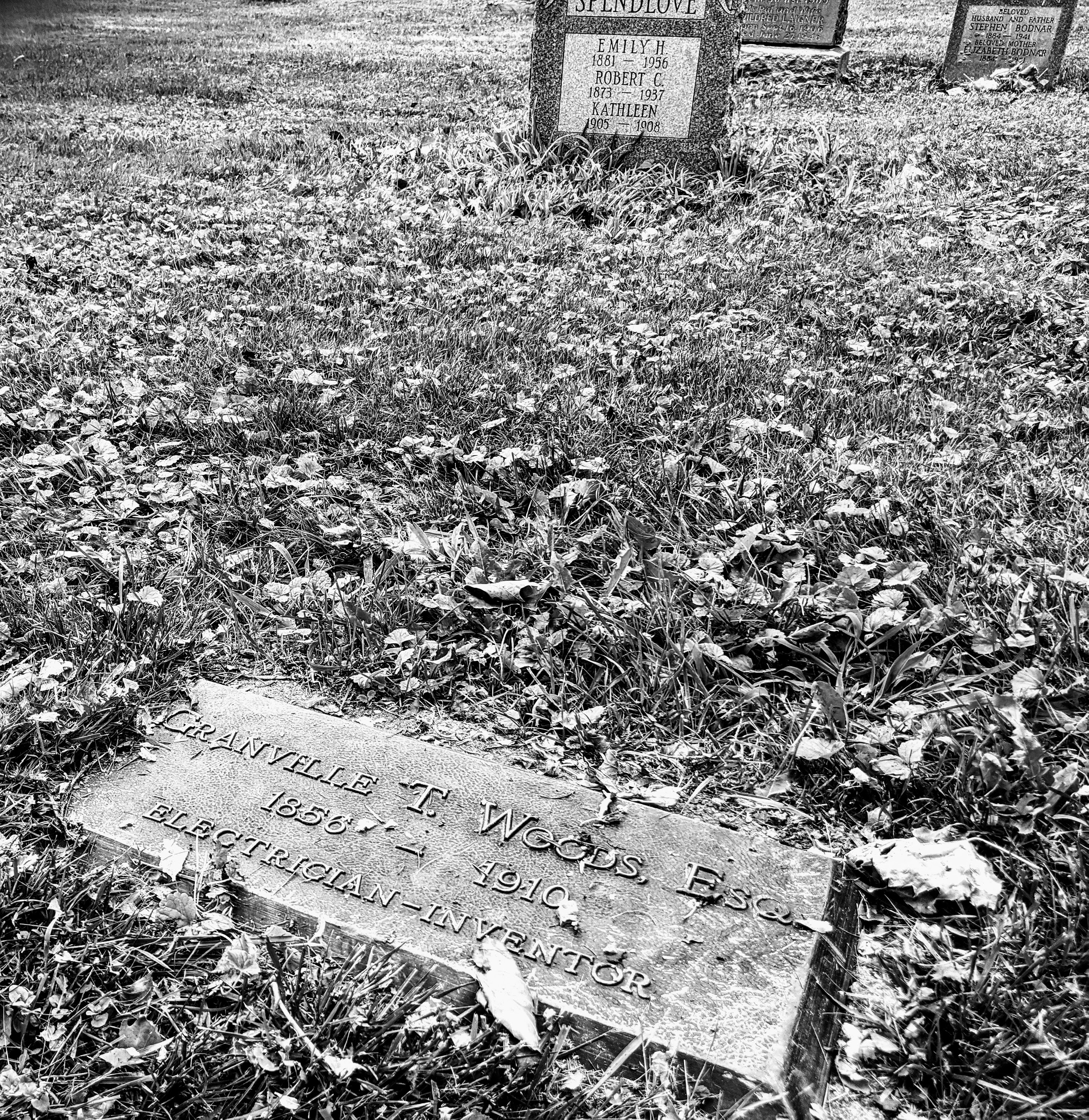
Woods' grave marker in St. Michael's Cemetery

Woods died penniless, of a cerebral hemorrhage at Harlem Hospital in New York City on January 30, 1910, having sold a number of his devices to such companies as Westinghouse, General Electric, and American Engineering. Woods was interred at St. Michael's Cemetery in Elmhurst, Queens in an unmarked grave. Historian M.A. Harris helped raise funds, persuading several of the corporations that used Woods' inventions to donate money in order to purchase a headstone, which was erected at Woods' gravesite in 1975.

Baltimore City Community College established the Granville T. Woods scholarship in memory of the inventor.

In 2004, the New York City Transit Authority organized an exhibition on Woods that utilized bus and train depots and an issue of four million MetroCards commemorating the inventor's work on third rail electrification.

In 2006, Woods was inducted into the National Inventors Hall of Fame.

In 2008, the corner of Stillwell and Mermaid Avenues in Brooklyn was named Granville T. Woods Way to honor Woods. Its location is situated across Stillwell Avenue, opposite the Coney Island–Stillwell Avenue rail and bus terminal.
