= George Ford (illustrator) =

American illustrator (born 1926)

George Cephas Ford (born August 3, 1926) is an American illustrator. He was the first illustrator to receive a Coretta Scott King Award, earning the inaugural honor in 1974 for his work on Ray Charles by Sharon Bell Mathis. Over a career spanning more than five decades, Ford has illustrated more than 30 children’s books and has been recognized as a significant figure in the development of diverse and authentic representation in U.S. children’s literature.

== Early life and education ==
Ford was born in Brooklyn, New York on August 3, 1926. He was raised in the Brownsville neighborhood of Brooklyn, New York. He has credited the Stone Avenue branch of the Brooklyn Public Library with playing a formative role in his artistic development, noting that the library provided early exposure to a broad range of books and music.

Before 1950, limited opportunities for Black artists in publishing restricted both the hiring of Black illustrators and the appearance of Black characters in children’s literature. Ford began his career drawing seasonal and holiday scenes for a greeting card company. In 1965, after being encouraged by a Brooklyn Public Library administrator, he contacted Mel Williamson of Viking Press, then the only Black art director at a major publishing house, which initiated his transition into book illustration.

== Career ==
Ford’s first illustrated book, Tales Told Near a Crocodile, was published in 1967. His 1969 book Freddy Found a Frog is considered among the early children’s books to depict Black children in a realistic and central manner.

In 1974, Ford received the inaugural Coretta Scott King Illustrator Award for Ray Charles. He later stated that the award symbolized increased recognition for Black authors and illustrators during a period when they were rarely acknowledged by major literary prizes.

Ford illustrated Bright Eyes, Brown Skin (1991), written by Cheryl Willis Hudson and Bernette Ford, a title that received the Benjamin Franklin Award. His illustration work for The Story of Ruby Bridges (1995), written by Robert Coles, has been noted by educators and critics as an important element in presenting the historical narrative of Ruby Bridges’ integration of an all-white school in New Orleans in 1960.

== Selected Works ==
- Ray Charles by Sharon Bell Mathis (1973)
- The Story of Ruby Bridges
- Wild Wild Hair
- Baby Jesus Like My Brother
- Willie's Wonderful Pet
- Jamal's Busy Day
- Bright Eyes Brown Skin
- The Best Time of Day

== Artistic style ==
Ford’s work is characterized by expressive, realistic depictions of Black children and families, with particular attention to facial expression and body language. His illustration process typically begins with repeated readings of a manuscript to determine tone and thematic direction. Ford works in several media, including watercolor, acrylic, tempera, and oil. For Ray Charles, he used black-and-white illustrations to emphasize emotional content and musical rhythm, including a visual device depicting Charles at multiple ages within a single spread.

== Advocacy and professional involvement ==
Ford served as president of the Council on Interracial Books for Children and was an active member of Black Creators for Children. Through these organizations, he advocated for broader inclusion of Black authors and illustrators in children’s publishing. In interviews, he has stated that the Coretta Scott King Book Awards emerged in response to the underrecognition of Black creators by major award committees.

== Personal life ==
Ford was married to Bernette Ford, a children’s book editor and author who was the first African American vice president at Grosset & Dunlap and later founded the Cartwheel Books imprint at Scholastic. The couple met in the mid-1970s through their work with Black Creators for Children. They have one daughter, Olivia. Ford resides in Brooklyn, New York, and is known as a longtime jazz enthusiast.

== Legacy ==
Ford has been featured in exhibitions recognizing Coretta Scott King Illustrator Award recipients. His emphasis on research, cultural authenticity, and representational accuracy has influenced subsequent generations of illustrators. His work is regarded as an important contribution to increasing representation of Black children in American picture books.
