= Tom Feelings =

American artist and author (1933–2003)

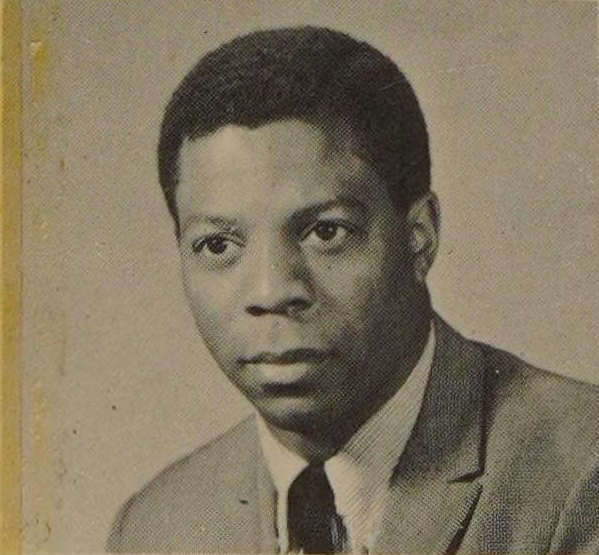
- Portrait from the first edition of To Be a Slave (1968)
- Born: May 19, 1933 Brooklyn, New York, U.S.
- Died: August 25, 2003 (aged 70) Mexico
- Areas: Cartoonist, illustrator
- Notable works: Tommy Traveler In the World of Negro History (1991); To Be a Slave (1968); The Middle Passage: White Ships/Black Cargo (1995)
- Awards: Caldecott Honor, 1972, 1975; Coretta Scott King Award, 1996
- Spouse: Muriel Feelings (m. 1969–1974)

Tom Feelings (May 19, 1933 – August 25, 2003) was an American artist, cartoonist, children's book illustrator, author, teacher, and activist. Many of his books focus on African-American and African culture, such as To Be a Slave (1968), Jambo Means Hello (1974), and The Middle Passage: White Ships/Black Cargo (1995).

Feelings was the recipient of numerous awards for his art in children's picture books. Feelings was the first African-American artist to receive a Caldecott Honor, and was the recipient of a grant from the National Endowment for the Arts in 1982. Born in Brooklyn, New York, he lived in New York City, Ghana, Guyana, and Columbia, South Carolina.

== Biography ==
Tom Feelings was born on May 19, 1933, in the Bedford-Stuyvesant section of Brooklyn, New York. He studied cartooning at the Cartoonists and Illustrators School from 1951 to 1953 and, after serving in the United States Air Force working in the Graphics Division, returned to New York to study illustration at the now-renamed School of Visual Arts from 1957 to 1960.

Feelings' earliest known (signed) comic book work may be the story "Scandal" in Key Publication's third issue of Radiant Love (February 1953). He created the groundbreaking comic strip Tommy Traveler In the World of Negro History for the New York Age in 1958. Tommy Traveler is a black youth's dream adventures in American history while reading of notable black heroes. This material was released in book form in 1991.

In 1960, Feelings illustrated The Street Where You Live, a four-color comic for the NAACP's pamphlet on voter registration. Another example of Feelings' early work are the illustrations that accompanied "The Negro in the U.S." for Look Magazine in 1961.

Feelings moved to Tema, Ghana, in 1964 and served as illustrator and consultant for the African Review, a magazine published by the Ghanaian government, until 1966.

In 1967, Feelings illustrated Crispus Attucks and the Minutemen, the third in Bertram Fitzgerald's Golden Legacy series of comic books about black history that eventually included 16 volumes and was published until 1976. Crispus Attucks, the first casualty of the American Revolution, was also one of the historical figures that Feelings included in the Tommy Traveler comic strip.

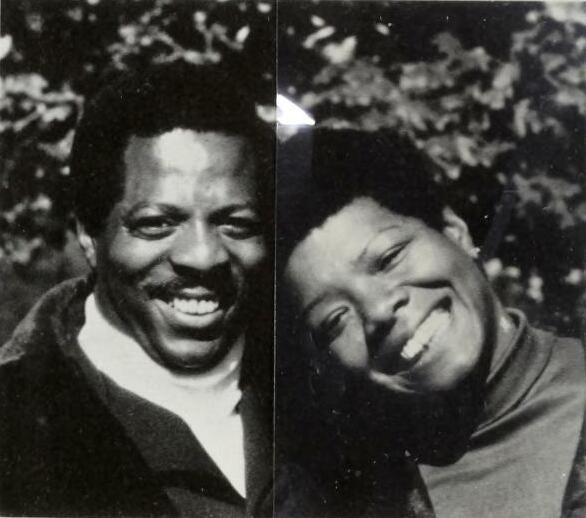
Feelings with Maya Angelou, c. 1987

From the late 1960s through the 1990s, Feelings concentrated on children's books, illustrating other authors' works as well as writing his own. Notable titles included To Be a Slave (written by Julius Lester), Moja Means One: Swahili Counting Book, Jambo Means Hello: A Swahili Alphabet Book, and The Middle Passage: White Ships/Black Cargo.

Feelings was married to fellow children's book author and his frequent collaborator Muriel Feelings from 1969 to 1974.

Feelings was an artist in residence and professor of art at the University of South Carolina in Columbia, SC from 1990 to 1996.

On August 25, 2003, Feelings died at age 70 in Mexico, where he had been receiving treatment for cancer.

== Bibliography ==
=== Comic books ===
- Tommy Traveler in the World of Negro History (1958-?)
- "Crispus Attucks and the Minutemen", Golden Legacy #3 (1967)

=== Book illustrations ===
- Bola and Oba's Drummer by Letta Schatz (1967)
- To Be a Slave by Julius Lester (1968)
- Zamani Goes to Market by Muriel Feelings (1970)
- Moja Means One: Swahili Counting Book by Muriel Feelings (1971)
- Jambo Means Hello: Swahili Alphabet Book by Muriel Feelings (1974)
- Something on My Mind by Nikki Grimes (1978)
- Black Child by Joyce Carol Thomas (1981)
- Daydreamers by Eloise Greenfield (1981)
- Now Sheba Sings the Song by Maya Angelou (1987)

=== Words and pictures ===
- Tommy Traveler in the World of Black History by Tom Feelings (1991)
- Soul Looks Back in Wonder edited and illustrated by Tom Feelings (1993)
- The Middle Passage: White Ships/Black Cargo by Tom Feelings (1995)

=== Artists' books ===
- With Care by Ruth E. Edwards, illustrations by Tom Feelings

== Awards ==
To Be a Slave was recognized in 1969 as a Newbery Honor Book, an ALA Notable Book, a Hornbook Fanfare Best Book, the Library of Congress Children's Literature Center Best Children's Book, the School Library Journal's Best Book of the Year, and the Smithsonian Best Book of the Year. It was given a Lewis Carroll Shelf Award in 1970.

Feelings received a 1972 Caldecott Medal Honor along with his wife, Muriel Feelings, for their book Moja Means One: Swahili Counting Book. The pair won the 1975 Caldecott Medal for Jambo Means Hello: A Swahili Alphabet Book, which also won a 1974 Boston Globe–Horn Book Award.

In 1979, Feelings won his first Coretta Scott King Illustrator Award for Something on My Mind. He would go on to win the award again in 1994 for Soul Looks Back in Wonder and in 1996 for The Middle Passage: White Ships/Black Cargo. The Middle Passage also won a special commendation at the 1996 Jane Addams Children's Book Award ceremonies.

In 2001, the South Carolina Department of Education honored Feelings in its African-American History Month calendar alongside Merl Code, Sanco Rembert, Mamie Johnson, Bill Pinkney, and other notable black South Carolinians.
