= ECBACC =

Comic convention in Philadelphia, Pennsylvania

East Coast Black Age of Comics Convention
- Status: Active
- Genre: Comic books
- Venue: Enterprise Center
- Location: Philadelphia, Pennsylvania
- Country: United States
- Inaugurated: 2002
- Organizer: Yumy Odom
- Filing status: 501 (c)(3)
- Website: ecbacc.com

The East Coast Black Age of Comics Convention (ECBACC) is the Philadelphia region's first black comic book convention, bringing together hundreds of comic book, science fiction, and fantasy creators, their colleagues, and their fans. The ECBACC is a 501 (c)(3) non-profit community-based organization focused on education, literacy and the arts. ECBACC, Inc. was founded in 2002 by Yumy Odom, a multidisciplinary educator, scientist and researcher affiliated with Temple University, and Maurice Waters.

ECBACC is an outgrowth of the "Black Age of Comics", a movement (ca. 1981–present) and era (ca. 1990–1997) dedicated to people of African descent creating a plethora and range of Black (Pan-African/Africentric/Afrocentric/African-centered) characters in the U.S. comic book industry. (The earliest documented "Black Age" comic book character is NOG: Protector of the Pyramids, introduced in 1981 by Chicago-based artist Turtel Onli ["NOG" is an acronym for "Nubian of Greatness."])

ECBACC is generally held on a May weekend in Philadelphia, with festivities kicking off on Friday evening for the Glyph Comics Awards ceremonies (often held at the African American Museum in Philadelphia), followed by a full-day convention on Saturday. The ECBACC STARS Workshop (an acronym for Storytelling That Advances Reading Skills) is an ECBACC initiative designed to use comic book art and imagery as a vehicle to foster creativity and promote literacy, with a secondary focus on introducing participants to the various career options that exist within the comic book industry. ECBACC STARS participants learn what it is like to be comic book creators via the "Create Your Own Hero" exercises while they put their imaginations to work as they pen their own stories for the characters they create. Along with panels, seminars, and workshops with comic book professionals, ECBACC now features a costume contest.

== History ==
Originally slated to be called the Pan-African Comic Convention (PAC-Con) or First World Komix Con (1st World Con), and after over a decade of deliberations, networking and consortium-building (from 1990 to 2001), the first convention was held in Temple University's Ritter Hall, in the Walk Auditorium, on May 11, 2002. Guests at the inaugural show included Arvell Jones, William H. Foster, III, Lance Tooks, and Jerry Craft.

The 2003 show had 50 attendees coming to see such guests as William H. Foster, III, Jerry Craft, and Anthony Jappa.

In 2004, ECBACC inaugurated the ECBACC Pioneer Lifetime Achievement Award; beginning in 2005, the convention expanded to two days. Starting in 2006, the Glyph Comics Awards became part of the annual ECBACC convention.

The 2007 show featured guests Dwayne McDuffie, Kyle Baker, and Taimak.

The 2008 show was dedicated to celebrating black women in comics; guests included Jerry Craft and special featured guest Nichelle Nichols, who received the ECBACC Pioneer /Lifetime Achievement Award in-person.

The 2009 convention featured such guests as Kevin Grevioux, Jamal Igle, Reggie Byers, Leslie Esdaile Banks, and Eric Battle.

The 2010 show included Eric Battle, Reggie Byers, Shawn Martinbrough, and Larry Stroman.

The 2011 ECBACC featured guests Jerry Craft, Alex Simmons, and Eric Battle. And was celebrated as the event's 10th anniversary.

The 2012 show featured ECBACC's first annual costume contest, dubbed "AfriCoz", was held on Saturday, May 19. Guests at the show included William H. Foster, III, Alex Simmons, and Eric Battle.

The 2013 ECBACC included the screening of the documentary film White Scripts and Black Supermen and the second annual costume contest.

The 2014 show featured ECBACC's second celebration of Black women in the comic book and sci-fi industry.

The 2015 show was billed as ECBACC AT THE MOVIES, which highlighted up and coming filmmakers of Black Sci-Fi content.

The 2016 show was held on May 21, and included guests; Milton Davis, Tony Isabella, Bashea Imana, Balogun Ojetade and international cartoonist Tayo Fatunla.

The 2017 show was held on May 20, and featured guests such as: Naseed Gifted, N. Steven Harris, Karama Horne, Kurenai Kiba, Don McGregor, and Uraeus.

The 2018 show was held on May 19, and included guests; Eric Battle, Mshindo Kuumba I, Sheeba Maya, and Regine Sawyer.

The 2019 show was held on May 18, and featured guests such as: Aaron Beatty.

The 2020 ECBACC had to be cancelled due to the COVID-19 pandemic; as an alternative, a one-day virtual event, entitled, ECBACC's first "E-Convention", was held on July 11, 2020.

The 2021 ECBACC was cancelled due to the COVID-19 pandemic.

The 2022 show, which marked the organization's return to a physical event, was billed as ECBACC IN THE PARK, and featured guests as: Kaloni Davis, Nakia Dillard, Ariell Johnson, and Javier Winnik.

== Events ==
=== Awards ===
==== ECBACC Pioneer Lifetime Achievement Award ====
The ECBACC Pioneer Lifetime Achievement Award honors those men and women, many unsung, who have made innovative, dynamic, and lasting contributions to the comic book and science-fiction industry, and who have paved the way for others.

- 2004: Samuel Joyner — political cartoonist of Philadelphia Tribune fame
- 2005: Bertram Fitzgerald — creator of Golden Legacy comics
- 2006:
  - Tony Tallarico — creator of Lobo, the first African-American character to headline his own comic
  - Turtel Onli, the "Father of the Black Age" concept
- 2007: Larry Fuller — "One of the Kings of Underground Comix"
- 2008: Nichelle Nichols — Star Trek's Lt. Nyota Uhura
- 2009: No ECBACC PLA Award honoree
- 2010: No ECBACC PLA Award honoree
- 2011, three posthumous ECBACC PLA Awards:
  - Orrin Cromwell Evans & George J. Evans, Jr. — creators of All-Negro Comics (1947), the U.S.'s first independent black comic book
  - Dwayne McDuffie — co-founder of Milestone Media (1993), a subsidiary of DC Comics, which created numerous multicultural characters, among them: Hardware, Icon, Static, Blood Syndicate, and Shadow Cabinet

==== Glyph Comics Awards ====
The Glyph Comics Awards, recognizing the best in comics made by, for, and about people of color from the preceding calendar year, are generally held on the Friday evening before the convention at the African American Museum in Philadelphia.

=== AFRICOZ and AFRICOZPLAY ===
ECBACC's AFRICOZPLAY costume contest is a new way in which ECBACC can fulfill its mission of celebrating positive images of Blacks (African-descended people) in the comic book and sci-fi industry. "AfriCoz" cosplay is defined as pop-culture cosplay with a cultural or aesthetic focus on portrayals of Black characters. "AfriCoz" not only celebrates Black characters but also allows costumers and cosplayers of African descent to fully engage the recreation of fantasy costuming without the cultural biases that brand Black characters as second-rate, inferior, and/or unpopular. A costumer who costumes as a character of Black or African descent is described as an Africozer or and Africosplayer.

Side note: Some Black cosplayers have felt they had few options but to dress as White (European-descended) superheroes and science-fiction characters, or even as Asian or Manga-styled characters, although doing so afforded them very little positive feedback, little notoriety, and a great lack of support from cosplayers at-large.

== Similar conventions ==
Other ongoing conventions with an Afrocentric theme include Onyxcon (Atlanta, GA), Motor City Black Age of Comics (Detroit) and the Schomburg Center's Black Comic Book Festival (New York City).

== See also ==
- Portrayal of black people in comics
