= Glyph Comics Awards =

Comics awards

- Awarded for: The best in comics made by, for, and about people of color
- Location: Philadelphia, Pennsylvania
- Country: United States
- Hosted by: East Coast Black Age of Comics Convention
- First award: 2006
- Website: www.ecbacc.com/glyph-comics-awards.html

The Glyph Comics Awards is an annual award ceremony for comic creators who are people of color. The ceremony was initiated with the goal of inspiring young writers from diverse backgrounds to participate in the comics industry.

The awards are named after Glyphs: The Language of the Black Comics Community, at Pop Culture Shock, a blog founded in 2005 by comic journalist Rich Watson as "a means to provide news and commentary on comics with black themes, as well as tangential topics in the fields of black science-fiction/fantasy and animation."

The Glyph Comics Awards have been presented at the East Coast Black Age of Comics Convention, in Philadelphia, since 2006.

== Judges ==
=== 2006 ===
- Omar Bilal, creator of the Museum of Black Superheroes website
- Guy LeCharles Gonzalez, senior comics editor at Pop Culture Shock
- Stephanie Brandford, moderator of the Dwayne McDuffie forum at VHive
- Eliot Johnson, co-founder of the fan club STEEL (Stop Trying to Eliminate Ethnic Legends) and former columnist with Broken Frontier
- Rich Watson, Glyph Comics Awards founder

=== 2007 ===
- Johanna Draper Carlson, founder of the review website ComicsWorthReading.com
- Pam Noles, professional writer and former Eisner Awards judge
- Calvin Reid, senior editor for Publishers Weekly and former Eisner Awards judge
- Hannibal Tabu, online comics reviewer and professional fiction writer
- Rich Watson, Glyph awards founder

=== 2008 ===
- Cheryl Lynn Eaton, comics journalist and founder of the Ormes Society
- Prof. William Foster, comics historian and lecturer
- Tony Isabella, comics writer and columnist
- Katherine Keller, editor-in-chief, Sequential Tart
- Rich Watson, Glyph awards founder

=== 2009 ===
- Valerie D'Orazio, president of the Friends of Lulu
- Nathan Erhardt, writer, Comics Nexus
- Ed Mathews, columnist, Pop Image
- Tim O'Shea, writer/interviewer, TalkingWithTim.com
- Elayne Riggs, comics reviewer and commentator

=== 2010 ===
- David Brothers, comics blogger (4th Letter!)
- Carol Burrell, editorial director, Graphic Universe/Lerner Publishing Group
- Brian Cronin, writer, Comic Book Resources
- Katie & Dan Merritt, co-owners, Green Brain Comics

=== 2011 ===
- Jennifer Contino, comics journalist
- Martha Cornog, graphic novel columnist for Library Journal
- Joseph Phillip Illidge, writer, Expo Weekly
- J. Calendar Mozzocco, writer for Newsarama
- Chad Nevett, writer for Comics Should Be Good

=== 2012 ===
- Omar Bilal, webmaster, BlackSuperhero.com
- Robin Brenner, editor-in-chief, NoFlyingNoTights.com
- David Brothers, comics blogger, 4thLetter.com
- Tim Callahan, comics blogger, Comic Book Resources

=== 2013 ===
- Maurice Waters, owner and operator of Blackscifi.com
- Hannibal Tabu, review columnist at Comic Book Resources
- Omar Bilal, Owner and Operator of Museum of Black Superheroes
- Eric Deggans, TV and media critic, Tampa Bay Times

=== 2014 ===
- Pamela Thomas, Glyph Comics Awards Chairperson and curator of the Museum of UnCut Funk, a virtual museum that celebrates 1970s Black culture
- Omar Bilal, founder of the Museum of Black Superheroes
- Johanna Draper Carlson, founder of ComicsWorthReading.com
- Hannibal Tabu, author, comics reviewer, and editor-in-chief of Komplicated at The Good Men Project
- Maurice Waters, owner of Black-Scifi.com
- Joseph Wheeler III, president of the New Art Order, founder of the OnyxCon convention, and creator of the UAC ANKh Project

=== 2016 ===
- Pamela Thomas, Glyph Comics Awards chair
- Michael A. Gonzales, author, writer, blogger
- Regina L. Sawyer, owner of Lockett Down Publications
- Grace D. Gipson, doctoral student, University of California, Berkeley
- Jiba Molei Anderson, CEO of Griot Enterprises
- Mark A. Randolph, writer, educator, and collector

=== 2020 ===
- Shenkarr Davis, Glyph Comics Award chair
- Crystal Sparrow, freelance writer
- Carla Wiley, co-founder of Progeny's Legacy Jamaa
- William Mason Jones, founder of Afrofuturism Network
- Deirdre Hollman, founder of the Black Comics Collective
- Tatiana Bacchus, videographer/filmmaker

== List of Glyph Comics Awards winners ==
=== Pioneer Award ===
- 2004: Samuel Joyner, cartoonist
- 2005: Bertram Fitzgerald, editor and publisher, Golden Legacy Comics
- 2006: Turtel Onli, creative artist and educator
- 2007: Larry Fuller, underground comics artist and publisher

=== Story of the Year ===
- 2006: Nat Turner, Kyle Baker, writer and artist
- 2007: Stagger Lee, Derek McCulloch, writer, Shepherd Hendrix, artist
- 2008: Sentences: The Life of MF Grimm, Percy Carey, writer, Ronald Wimberly, artist
- 2009: Bayou, Jeremy Love, writer and artist
- 2010: Unknown Soldier #13-14, Joshua Dysart, writer, Pat Masioni, artist
- 2011: Fist, Stick, Knife, Gun, Geoffrey Canada, writer, Jamar Nicholas, artist
- 2012: Princeless, Jeremy Whitley, writer, M. Goodwin, artist
- 2013: Monsters 101, Muhammad Rasheed, writer/artist
- 2014: Watson and Holmes #6, Brandon Easton (writer) and N. Steven Harris (artist)
- 2015: Shaft, David F. Walker (writer) and Bilquis Evely (artist)
- 2016: Revelation: Brotherman-Dictator of Discipline, Dawud Anyabwile (artist), Guy A. Sims (writer), and Brian McGee (colorist)
- 2017: March Book Three, John Lewis and Andrew Aydin (writers) and Nate Powell (artist)
- 2018: Matty's Rocket: Book One, Tim Fielder (writer/artist)
- 2019: Is'Nana the Were-Spider, Vol 2: The Hornet’s Web, Greg Anderson Elysee (writer) and Daryl Toh (artist)
- 2020: Malika — Fallen Queen Part One, Roye Okupe (writer); Sunkanmi Akinboye and Etubi Onucheyo (artists)

=== Best Writer ===
- 2006: Lance Tooks, Lucifer's Garden of Verses: Darlin' Niki
- 2007: Derek McCulloch, Stagger Lee
- 2008: James Sturm, Satchel Paige: Striking Out Jim Crow
- 2009: Jeremy Love, Bayou
- 2010: Alex Simmons, Archie & Friends
- 2011: Joshua Dysart, Unknown Soldier
- 2012: Jeremy Whitley, Princeless
- 2013: Brandon M. Easton, Shadowlaw
- 2014: Brandon M. Easton, Watson and Holmes #6
- 2015: Keef Cross, Day Black
- 2016: Juliana "Jewels" Smith, (H)Afrocentric
- 2017: John Lewis & Andrew Aydin, March Book Three
- 2018: Jamar Nicholas, Leon: Protector of the Playground
- 2019: Greg Anderson Elysee, Is 'Nana the Were-Spider, Vol 2: The Hornet’s Web
- 2020: Newton Lilavois, Crescent City Monsters

=== Best Artist ===
- 2006: Kyle Baker, Nat Turner
- 2007: Kyle Baker, The Bakers
- 2008: Kyle Baker, Nat Turner: Revolution
- 2009: Jeremy Love, Bayou
- 2010: Jay Potts, World of Hurt
- 2011: Richard Koslowski, BB Wolf and the 3 LPs
- 2012: Sara Pichelli, Ultimate Comics: Spider-Man
- 2013: Chris Samnee, Ultimate Comics: Spider-Man #6
- 2014: N. Steven Harris, Watson and Holmes #6
- 2015: Nelson Blake 2, Artifacts
- 2016: Dawud Anyabwile, Brotherman: Dictator of Discipline: Revelation Book One
- 2017: Brian Stelfreeze, Black Panther
- 2018: Shauna J. Grant, Princess Love Pon
- 2019: Khary Randolph, Roger Robinson, and Manuel Garcia, Noble, Vol 2: Never Events
- 2020: Gian Carlo Bernal, Crescent City Monsters

=== Best Male Character ===
- 2006: Huey Freeman, The Boondocks; Aaron McGruder, writer/artist
- 2007: Stagger Lee, Stagger Lee; Derek McCulloch, writer, Shepherd Hendrix, artist; inspired by the life of Lee Shelton
- 2008: Emmet Wilson, Satchel Paige: Striking Out Jim Crow; co-created by James Sturm, writer, and Rich Tommaso, artist
- 2009: Black Lightning, Final Crisis: Submit; Grant Morrison, writer, Matthew Clark, Norm Rapmund, Rob Hunter, and Don Ho, artists
- 2010: Isaiah Pastor, World of Hurt; created by Jay Potts, writer and artist
- 2011: Geoff, Fist, Stick, Knife, Gun; created by Geoffrey Canada, writer, and Jamar Nicholas, artist
- 2012: Miles Morales; Ultimate Comics: Spider-Man; Brian Michael Bendis, writer, Sara Pichelli, artist; inspired by the character created by Stan Lee & Steve Ditko
- 2013: Mort; Monsters 101; Muhammad Rasheed, writer/artist
- 2014: Jack Maguire; Nowhere Man: You Don't Know Jack; Jerome Walford, writer/artist
- 2015: Bass Reeves; Bass Reeves: Tales of the Talented Tenth; Joel Christian Gill, writer/artist
- 2016: Arron Day (Blackjack); BlackJack: There Came a Dark Hunter; Alex Simmons, writer; Tim Fielder, artist
- 2017: Matt Trakker; M.A.S.K. — Mobile Armored Strike Kommand; Brandon Easton, writer; Tony Vargas & Tommy Lee Edwards, artists
- 2018: Is 'nana the Were-Spider; Is 'nana the Were-Spider: The Hornet's Web #1, Greg Anderson-Elysee, writer/artist
- 2019: Noble; Noble, Vol 2: Never Events, Brandon Thomas (writer), Khary Randolph, Roger Robinson, and Manuel Garcia (artists)
- 2020: Is'nana the Were-Spider; Is 'nana the Were-Spider: The Ballads of Rawhead and John Henry, Greg Anderson Elysee (writer) and David Brame & Walter Ostlie (artists)
- 2026: Dwayne "Dady" Glover; Beware of Toddler, George Gant (writer and artist)

=== Best Female Character ===
- 2006: Darlin' Niki, Lucifer's Garden of Verses: Darlin' Niki
- 2007: Thomasina Lindo, Welcome to Tranquility; co-created by Gail Simone, writer, Neil Googe, artist
- 2008: Amanda Waller, Checkmate; Greg Rucka, writer, Joe Bennett & Jack Jadson, artists
- 2009: Lee Wagstaff, Bayou,, Jeremy Love, writer and artist
- 2010: Aya, Aya: The Secrets Come Out, created by Marguerite Abouet, writer, Clement Oubrerie, artist
- 2011: Selena, 28 Days Later, created by Michael Alan Nelson, writer, Declan Shalvey and Marek Oleksicki, artists
- 2012: Adrienne; Princeless; created by Jeremy Whitley, writer, and M. Goodwin, artist
- 2013: Dyana; Night Stalker; Orlando Harding, writer; David Miller, artist
- 2014: Ajala Storm; Ajala: A Series of Adventures; Robert Garrett (writer) and N. Steven Harris (artist)
- 2015: Ajala Storm; Ajala: A Series of Adventures; Robert Garrett (writer) and N. Steven Harris & Walt Msonza Barna, (artists)
- 2016: Moon Girl; Moon Girl and Devil Dinosaur; Brandon Montclare and Amy Reeder (writers) and Natacha Bustos and Amy Reeder (artists)
- 2017: Lily Brown; Malice in Ovenland vol. #1; Micheline Hess, writer/artist
- 2018: Matty Watty; Matty's Rocket: Book One Tim Fielder (writer/artist)
- 2019: Blackstarr; Blackstarr: Birth of a Supernova Part 1, by Charlene R. Jones (writer) and Corey Thomas (artist)
- 2020: Iyanu; Iyanu, Child of Wonder Chapter One, by Roye Okupe (writer) and Godwin Akpan (artist)

=== Rising Star Award ===
- 2006: Robert Roach, The Roach
- 2007: Spike Trotman, Templar, Arizona
- 2008: Marguerite Abouet, Aya
- 2009: Damian Duffy and John Jennings, The Hole: Consumer Culture
- 2010: Jay Potts, World of Hurt
- 2011: Jamar Nicholas, Fist, Stick, Knife, Gun
- 2012: Whit Taylor, Watermelon
- 2013: Raymond Ayala, writer, H.O.P.E.
- 2014: Alverne Ball (writer), Jason Reeves and Luis Guerrero (artists), One Nation #1
- 2015: Alverne Ball & Jason Reeves (writers), Lee Moyer and Ari Syahrazad (artists), One Nation: Old Druids
- 2016: Chuck Collins (writer and artist), Bounce!
- 2017: Marcus Williams and Greg Burnham, Tuskegee Heirs: Flames of Destiny
- 2018: Greg Anderson-Elysee, (writer and artist), Is'Nana the Were-Spider: The Hornet's Web #1
- 2019: Austine Osas (writer) and Yusuf Shittuh (artist), Under the Sun
- 2020: Allison Chaney Whitmore (writer) and Carola Borelli (artist), Love University
- 2021: George Gant (writer and artist), Beware of Toddler

=== Best Reprint Publication ===
- 2006: Birth of a Nation: a Comic Novel softcover, Crown
- 2007: Deogratias: A Tale of Rwanda, First Second Books; Mark Siegel, editor, Alexis Siegel, translator
- 2008: Aya, Drawn & Quarterly; Chris Oliveros, publisher, Helge Dascher, translator
- 2009: Me and the Devil Blues V1, , Del Rey Manga; David Ury, translator/adapter
- 2010: Aya: The Secrets Come Out, Drawn & Quarterly
- 2011: Superman vs. Muhammad Ali Deluxe Hardcover, DC Comics
- 2012: No award given
- 2013: No award given
- 2014: Martin Luther King and the Montgomery Story, Fellowship of Reconciliation/Top Shelf Productions
- 2015: Techwatch, Chameleon Creations
- 2016: Concrete Park vol. 2: R-E-S-P-E-C-T, Dark Horse Comics
- 2017: E.X.O.: The Legend of Wale Williams, Part One, YouNeek Studios
- 2018: Moon Girl and Devil Dinosaur vol. 3: Smartest There Is, Marvel Comics
- 2019: Malika – Warrior Queen Part One, YouNeek Studios
- 2020: Blackstarr: Birth of a Supernova Part One, Shugalene Publications

=== Best Cover ===
- 2006: Nat Turner #1, Kyle Baker, illustrator
- 2007: Stagger Lee, Shepherd Hendrix, artist
- 2008: Sentences: The Life of MF Grimm; Ronald Wimberly, illustrator
- 2009: Unknown Soldier #1; Igor Kordey, illustrator
- 2010: Luke Cage Noir #1; Tim Bradstreet, illustrator
- 2011: Unknown Soldier #5; Dave Johnson, illustrator
- 2012: Chew #27; Rob Guillory, illustrator
- 2013: Indigo Hit List 1.0; Charlie Goubile and Mshindo Kuumba I, artists
- 2014: Route 3 #2: A Date... A Destiny; Sean Hill, artist
- 2015: Offset #1: "The Man Who Travels with a Piece of Sugarcane": Tristan Roach, artist
- 2016: Blue Hand Mojo: Dust to Dust, John Jennings, artist
- 2017: Black #1, Khary Randolph, artist
- 2018: Matty's Rocket: Book One, Tim Fielder, artist
- 2019: Noble, Vol 2: Never Events, Khary Randolph, artist
- 2020: Crescent City Monsters #2, Gian Carlo Bernal, artist

=== Best Comic Strip or Webcomic ===
- 2006: The K Chronicles, Keith Knight, writer/artist
- 2007: The K Chronicles, Keith Knight, writer/artist
- 2008: The K Chronicles, Keith Knight, writer/artist
- 2009: Bayou, Jeremy Love, writer/artist
- 2010: The K Chronicles, Keith Knight, writer/artist
- 2011: The K Chronicles, Keith Knight, writer/artist
- 2012: Fungus Grotto, Shatia Hamilton, writer
- 2013: Mama's Boyz, Jerry Craft, writer/artist
- 2014: The Adigun Ogunsanwo, Carles C. J. Juzang, writer/artist
- 2015: Kamikaze; Alan and Carrie Tupper (writers and artists); Havana Nguyen (artist)
- 2016: Bounce!; Chuck Collins, writer/artist
- 2017: Tuskegee Heirs: Flames of Destiny; Marcus Williams (writer) and Greg Burnham (artist)
- 2018: (H)afrocentric vols. 1–4; Juliana "Jewels" Smith (writer); Ronald Nelson (artist)
- 2019: Weapon of the People: Decoded; Muhammad Rasheed (writer/artist)
- 2020: Isshoni, by Alfred Stewart (writer/artist)
- 2023: Beware of Toddler; George Gant (writer/artist)

=== Fan Award for Best Comic / Best Work ===
- 2006: Black Panther: Who is the Black Panther?, Reginald Hudlin, John Romita, Jr., Klaus Janson, Axel Alonso
- 2007: Storm, Eric Jerome Dickey, David Yardin & Lan Medina and Jay Leisten & Sean Parsons
- 2008: Fantastic Four: The New Fantastic Four; Dwayne McDuffie, writer, Paul Pelletier & Rick Magyar, artists
- 2009: Vixen: Return of the Lion; G. Willow Wilson, writer, Cafu, artist
- 2010: Luke Cage Noir; Mike Benson and Adam Glass, writers, Shawn Martinbrough, artist
- 2011: Captain America/Black Panther: Flags of our Fathers; Reginald Hudlin, writer, Denys Cowan, artist
- 2013: Ascended: The Omega Nexus, Roger Reece and Jerry Reece (writers)
- 2014: Watson and Holmes #6, Brandon Easton (writer) and N. Steven Harris (artist)
- 2015: OneNation: SafeHouse, Jason Reeves (writer), Samax Amen & Deon De Lange (artists)
- 2016: Bounce!; Chuck Collins, writer/artist
- 2017: M.A.S.K.: Mobile Armored Strike Kommand, Brandon Easton (writer) and Tony Vargas (artist)
- 2018: Is 'Nana the Were Spider: The Hornet's Web #1, Greg Anderson-Elysee (writer/artist)
- 2019: Endigo Society: The Golden Age, Norwick Robinson (writer), Mikhail Sebastian & Brandon Treadway
- 2020: Crescent City Monsters, Newton Lilavois (writer) and Gian Carlo Bernal (artist)
