= Jamar Nicholas =

American cartoonist (born 1973)

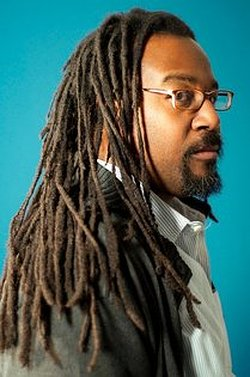
- Born: March 18, 1973 (age 53) Philadelphia, Pennsylvania
- Areas: Cartoonist, Writer, Artist
- Notable works: Fist, Stick, Knife, Gun; Detective Boogaloo: Hip-Hop Cop; Leon: Protector of the Playground
- Awards: See list

Jamar Nicholas (born March 18, 1973) is an African American cartoonist, graphic novelist, and educator based in Philadelphia, Pennsylvania. He is known for original graphic novel, Leon: Protector of the Playground, and his graphic novel adaptation of Fist, Stick, Knife, Gun, a memoir written by African American social activist Geoffrey Canada in 1995. Nicholas's work discusses topics such as bullying and violence while providing alternative, positive portrayals of black individuals.

== Early life ==
Nicholas grew up in Philadelphia, Pennsylvania, where he often watched Spider-Man on Saturday mornings and obsessively studied the frames of comic strips like Peanuts, Andy Capp, and Blondie. He attended Philadelphia High School for Creative and Performing Arts, graduating in 1990.

== Career ==
=== Cartoonist ===
Nicholas studied animation at University of the Arts (Philadelphia) beginning in 1991. In 1993, while working at La Salle University, he created The Adventures of Jamar & Patrick, or Patrick & Jamar, Whatever... alongside his friend and co-writer, Patrick White. The weekly, half-page comic appeared in The Collegian (La Salle University) from 1993 to 1994.

Nicholas began his professional career as a comic book artist in 1997 by self-publishing The Jamar Chronicles, which consists of two full-length comic books. In 2002, he created Detective Boogaloo: Hip-Hop Cop, a weekly webcomic that was originally published on Kevin Smith's website MoviePoopShoot.com, which went on hiatus for over a decade. Then in 2003, Nicholas served as editorial cartoonist of the Philadelphia Tribune, the oldest continually publishing African American newspaper in the United States. While at the Philadelphia Tribune, Nicholas produced two editorial cartoons each week for three years.

The graphic novel adaptation of Geoffrey Canada's 1995 memoir Fist, Stick, Knife, Gun, which Jamar Nicholas illustrated and adapted, was published in 2010 by Beacon Press. Chosen by Canada himself, Nicholas reportedly "called on his experience growing up in Philadelphia when he illustrated [the graphic novel]," which portrays Canada's formative years in the South Bronx. Nicholas stated to Ashley Huber of The Philadelphia Inquirer that he hoped the graphic novel would "open people's minds to the plight of young men," coming of age in underserved neighborhoods. The graphic novel received several awards, including Glyph Comics Awards for Story of the Year and Best Male Character in 2011. Nicholas also received the Rising Star Award from the Glyph Comics Awards that same year. The Young Adult Library Services Association later added the graphic adaptation to their booklist for the 2011 Great Graphic Novels for Teens.

In 2015, Detective Boogaloo returned in the Philadelphia, New York City, and Boston newspapers published by Metro International as a daily comic strip. Nicholas describes the comic as his "love letter to hip hop," citing his childhood, which took place during the birth of the genre. Detective Boogaloo was nominated for Best Comic Strip/Webcomic at the 2016 Glyph Awards.

Nicholas's work is featured in Black Comix: African American Comics, Art and Culture, a 2010 publication authored by cartoonists Damian Duffy and John Jennings that compiles the work of over fifty African American comic book artists. His work is featured again in the 2018 publication sequel, Black Comix Returns.

In September 2017, Baltimore Comic-Con announced Nicholas's launch of his original graphic novel, Leon: Protector of the Playground, which made its debut at the 2017 Baltimore Comic Con in October. At the end of the year 2017, Nicholas received The Artblog's 2017 Liberta Award for "Author! Author! BEST Books by Philadelphians." His graphic novel then went on to win the 2018 Dwayne McDuffie Award for Diversity in Comics, and Nicholas received the 2018 Glyph Comics Award for Best Writer.

In October 2022, Scholastic published "Leon the Extraordinary," an original graphic novel (and semi-reboot of his earlier self-published work). The book was met with overwhelmingly positive reviews, including a starred review in Publishers Weekly, and glowing reviews in School Library Journal and Kirkus Reviews.

=== Writer, educator, and host ===
Nicholas has taught courses at Arcadia University, Drexel University, and Moore College of Art and Design as an adjunct professor. The subjects of such courses include storytelling, animation, illustration, creative writing, and pop culture. Nicholas has hosted the Glyph Comic Awards for nearly ten consecutive years. He is also a columnist for Draw! Magazine, a "how-to" publication edited by comic book artist Mike Manley that discusses comics, cartooning, and animation. Beyond interviewing other notable comic book creators, he is the magazine's "Crusty Critic," maintaining a column on product and tool reviews. Alongside Rich Faber and John Gallagher, creators of Roboy Red and Buzzboy, Nicholas hosted the Comic Book Diner, a virtual studio and podcast focused on the business of comics.

== Bibliography (abridged) ==
=== Graphic novels and comic books ===
- Leon The Extraordinary (2022)
- Leon: Protector of the Playground (2017)
- Fist Stick Knife Gun: A Personal History of Violence (2010)
- The Grosse Adventures: Trouble at Twilight Cave, (vol. 3) (2007)
- The Grosse Adventures: Stinky & Stan Blast Off!, (vol. 2) (2007)
- Asteroid Girl & The Space Cadets, (vol. 1) (2000)
- GUMBO #2 (2000)
- The Jamar Chronicles, (vol. 2) (1998)
- The Jamar Chronicles, (vol. 1) (1997)

=== Comic strips and webcomics ===
- Stan: The Street Fighting Bowler (2010–present)
- Detective Boogaloo: Hip-Hop Cop (2002-2015)
- The Jamar Chronicles Weekly (2000)
- Low Rent (1994-1996)
- The Adventure of Jamar & Patrick, or Patrick & Jamar, Whatever... (1993-1994)

=== Exhibitions ===
- Jamar Nicholas: World Building, Arcadia University Art Gallery, Glenside, PA (2014)
- ON THE WALL Group Show, Painted Bride Art Center, Philadelphia, PA (2011)
- PARTY CRASHERS Group Show, Arlington Arts Center, Arlington, VA (2010)

=== Societies and organizations ===
- Member, Phi Beta Delta International Honors Society
- Member, Philadelphia Sketch Club
- Member, Philadelphia Cartoonist Society
- Member, Kids Love Comics! Creators’ Collective
- Member, COMIC BOOK DINER Virtual Studio

== Awards and nominations ==
Year	Nominee / work	Award	Result
2018	Leon: Protector of the Playground	Glyph Comics Award for Best Writer	Won
2018	Leon: Protector of the Playground	Glyph Comics Award for Best Artist	Nominated
2018	Leon: Protector of the Playground	Glyph Comics Award for Best Male Character	Nominated
2018	Leon: Protector of the Playground	Glyph Comics Fan Award for Best Work	Nominated
2018	Leon: Protector of the Playground	Dwayne McDuffie Award for Diversity in Comics	Won
2017	Leon: Protector of the Playground	Artblog Liberta Awards Author! Author! BEST Books by Philadelphians	Won
2016	Jamar Nicholas	Philly Geek Awards Comic Creator of the Year	Nominated
2016	Detective Boogaloo: Hip Hop Cop	Glyph Comics Award for Best Comic Strip or Webcomic	Nominated
2011	Fist, Stick, Knife, Gun	Glyph Comics Rising Star Award for Best Self-Publisher	Won
2011	Fist, Stick, Knife, Gun	Glyph Comics Award for Best Male Character	Won
2011	Fist, Stick, Knife, Gun	Glyph Comics Award for Story of the Year	Won
