= Fox School of Business and Management =

Business school of Temple University

Coordinates: 39.980287°N 75.155825°W

Richard J. Fox School of Business and Management
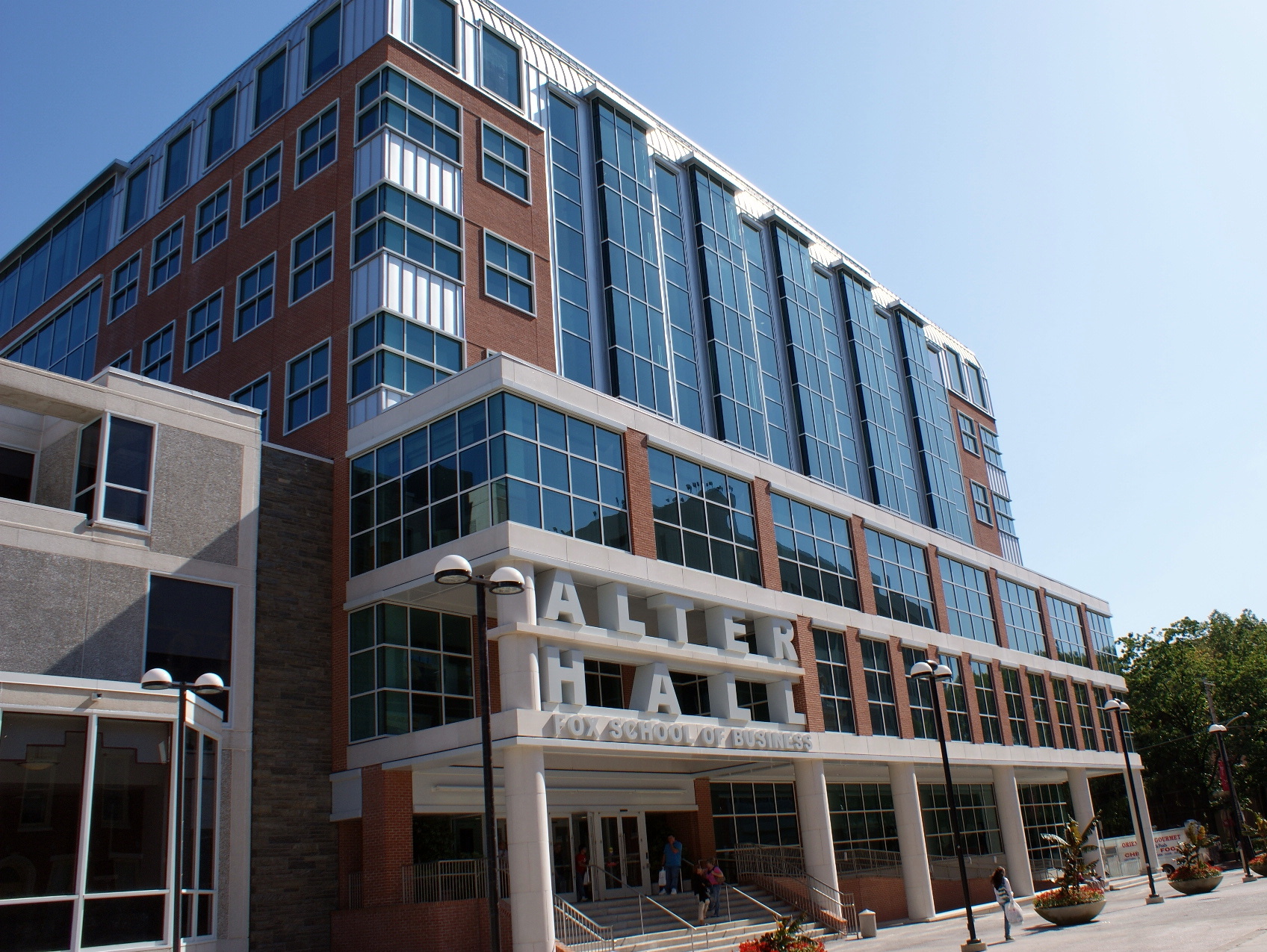
- Alter Hall on Montgomery Avenue and 13th Street
- Type: Business School
- Established: 1918
- Dean: Larry W. Hunter
- Academic staff: 225 Full-time
- Students: 6,500
- Undergraduates: 5,400
- Postgraduates: 1,100
- Location: Philadelphia, Pennsylvania, United States
- Campus: Urban
- Colors: Cherry and White
- Website: www.fox.temple.edu

The Richard J. Fox School of Business and Management is the business school of Temple University. Located in Philadelphia, the Fox School offers several Master of Business Administration (MBA) programs (full-time MBA, part-time MBA, international MBA, executive MBA and online MBA); several other master's degree programs; and several Ph.D. programs, including in accountancy, finance, marketing, international business, entrepreneurship, management of information systems, risk management and insurance, strategic management, and tourism/sports. The school has some 6,500 students, 155 full-time faculty, and over 42,000 graduates, of which about two-thirds live and work in the Philadelphia metropolitan area. It is the largest business school in the Philadelphia region and one of the largest in the world.

Established in 1918, it was named in honor of Richard J. Fox in 1999. The MBA program began in 1942. The school has been accredited by the International Association for Management Education (now the Association to Advance Collegiate Schools of Business (AACSB)) since 1973. The PhD in Economics program was established in 1976.

== Alter Hall ==
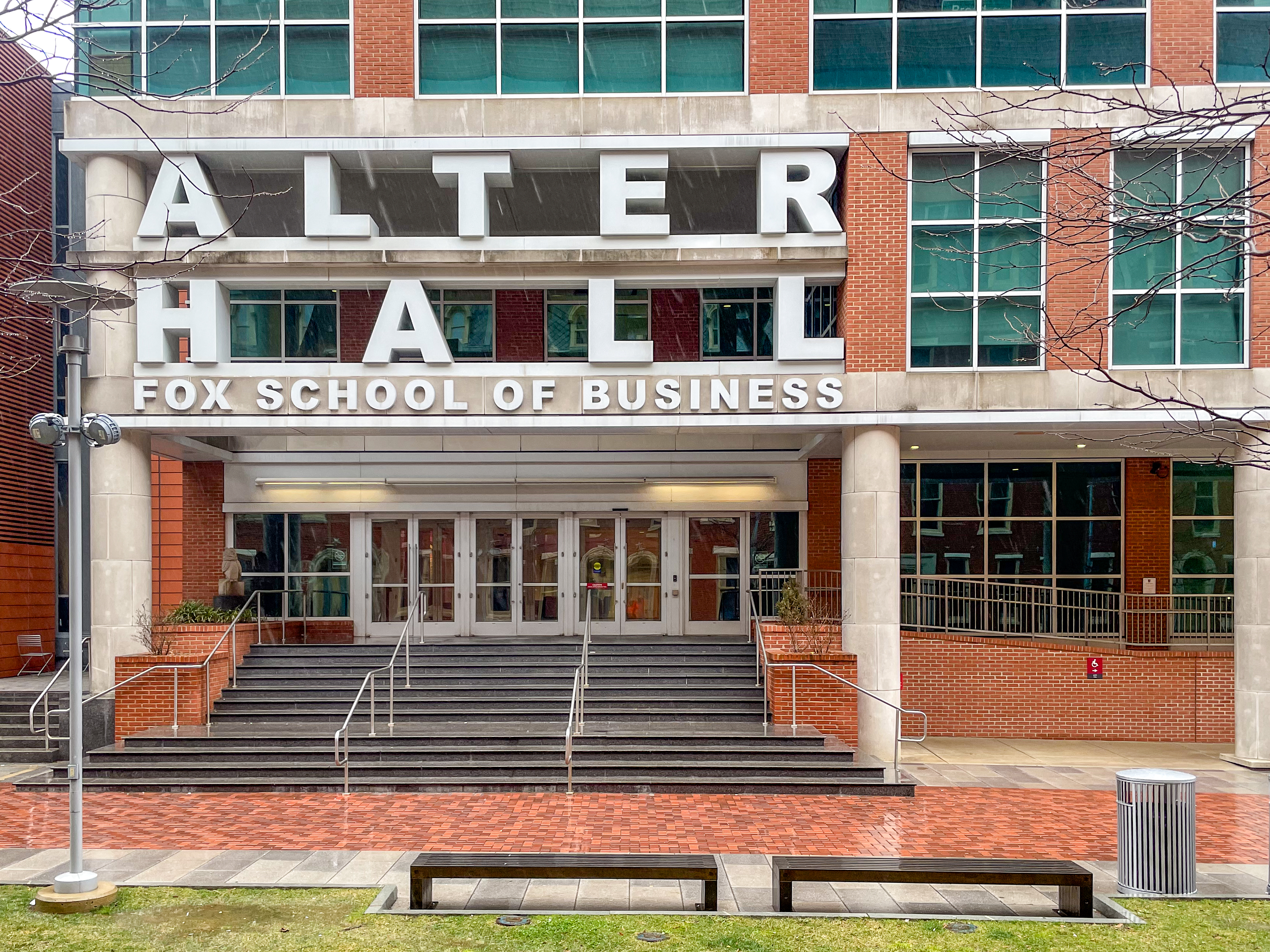
The main entrance to Alter Hall.

The Fox School opened an $80 million, 200,000 square foot facility named Alter Hall in April 2009. The seven-story building was constructed using smart classroom design components and features a trading room and business simulation center, along with one of the longest stock tickers in the United States.

== Notable alumni and faculty ==
- Cody Calafiore – actor, model
- John Carrig - former COO and president for ConocoPhillips
- Sam Greenblatt - vice president of technology and architecture in Enterprise Solution Group of Dell
- Jai Gulati - CEO of Systel
- Ariell Johnson - business owner
- Subodha Kumar
- Larry Miller - president of Jordan Brand, former president of Portland Trail Blazers
- Zach Pfeffer (born 1995) - soccer player
- Ash Vasudevan - founding Managing Partner of Edge Holdings

== See also ==
- List of United States business school rankings
- List of business schools in the United States
