= Promise Neighborhoods =

Promise Neighborhoods is a United States Department of Education program authorized under the Every Student Succeeds Act (ESSA). The Promise Neighborhoods program is based on the experience of programs such as the Harlem Children's Zone. The program's mission is to improve educational outcomes for students in distressed urban neighborhoods, rural neighborhoods, and Indian tribes.

== History ==
Promise Neighborhoods was initially a campaign promise by Barack Obama during the 2008 US presidential election. The program was part of the Obama administration's efforts on place-based initiatives.

=== Prior to ESSA ===
The Obama administration's Department of Education began Promise Neighborhoods almost immediately upon Obama's first term in office. The program was initially established under the legislative authority of the Fund for the Improvement of Education Programs. The Promise Neighborhoods program was initiated in two phases. The first phase was a call for proposals released in May 2010, resulting in 21 one-year Promise Neighborhoods planning grants to communities across the United States. $10 million was allocated in fiscal 2010 to support 21 communities with one year of funding to plan for the implementation of "cradle-to-career" services. The second phase requested implementation grant proposals, which were awarded in 2011 and 2012. The 2011 application cycle saw 20 awardees. In 2012, 17 more implementation grants were awarded. Between 2013 and 2015 no grants were awarded.

=== ESSA to Present ===
In 2015, the Promise Neighborhoods program was incorporated into the Every Student Succeeds Act. In 2016, six organizations were awarded more than $150 million. In 2017, four organizations were awarded nearly $120 million. The 2017 Promise Neighborhood recipients were Berea College, Cal State University East Bay Foundation, and the South Ward Children's Alliance.

The Trump administration proposed decreasing funding for this program and sought to cut the budget from $73 million in FY2017 to $60 million in FY2018; however, in the most recent FY2018 spending bill that was signed by President Trump, the program's budget was increased slightly.

== Goals ==
The Promise Neighborhoods program is a neighborhood-level education reform effort that relies on the collective action of community members, educational institutions, and nonprofits. Its primary goal is to reduce poverty through cradle to career social and educational interventions.

Promise Neighborhoods has five goals:

1. Identifying and increasing the capacity of eligible entities that are focused on achieving results for children and youth throughout an entire neighborhood;

2. Building a complete continuum of cradle-to-career solutions of both educational programs and family and community supports, with great schools at the center;

3. Integrating programs and breaking down agency "silos" so that solutions are implemented effectively and efficiently across agencies;

4. Developing the local infrastructure of systems and resources needed to sustain and scale up proven, effective solutions across the broader region beyond the initial neighborhood; and

5. Learning about the overall impact of the Promise Neighborhoods program and about the relationship between particular strategies in Promise Neighborhoods and student outcomes, including through a rigorous evaluation of the program.

— Promise Neighborhoods program website, https://innovation.ed.gov/what-we-do/parental-options/promise-neighborhoods-pn/

According to Sonya Douglass Horsford and Carrie Sampson, Promise Neighborhoods grounds its theory of action in finding ways to mitigate the effects of concentrated, intergenerational poverty on student success. Linda Valli, Amanda Stefanski, and Reuben Jacobson associate Promise Neighborhoods with a different theory of action in their typology of school-community partnerships. Categorizing Promise Neighborhoods as community development models of education reform, Valli and colleagues proposed a theory of action for Promise Neighborhoods as follows: "strengthening the community infrastructure and improving schools are interdependent goals that need to occur simultaneously". While the two proposed theories of action differ, they seem in agreement with each other and the US government's Promise Neighborhoods policy documentation.

== Collaboration and Partnerships ==
The Promise Neighborhood award system encourages collaboration between institutions and agencies with similar goals, in order to leverage resources in the target area. The Promise Neighborhoods initiative provides much needed incentive for community-based organizations to coalesce and communicate around the singular topic of how to support children from cradle to career. Promise Neighborhoods are unique in their practice of information sharing for collective impact.

Institutions of higher education hold a significant role in the Promise Neighborhoods with regards to program and service implementation, partnership-maintenance, capacity-building, and mission-related contributions. In many Promise Neighborhood grant applications, higher education institutions were set to contribute to workforce capacity training, research, youth programs, and administration. However, the information regarding the role of higher education institutions was identified from grant applications, and may not reflect actual practices in the Promise Neighborhoods.

=== Promise Neighborhoods Institute ===
The Promise Neighborhoods Institute is a technical assistance agency established by PolicyLink to assist communities participating in or with interest to participate in the Promise Neighborhoods program. Three partner agencies make up the institute: PolicyLink, the Center for the Study of Social Policy, and the Harlem Children's Zone.

== Challenges ==
Because federal grants only provide funding for 3 to 5 years, Promise Neighborhoods face sustainability issues. Grant awardees must consider where supplemental funding will come from and may have to partner with other agencies to maximize funds.

The "cradle-to-career" approach also poses challenges to Promise Neighborhoods because it creates a large age range to be served: prenatal to college-age. Additionally, because Promise Neighborhood programs are serving specific neighborhoods, it may be difficult to determine the effectiveness of services, since clients are not restricted to receiving services in that neighborhood. Another challenge in measuring the results of programs is the mobility of families, which may be moving in and out of the neighborhood.

The Government Accountability Office (GAO) found that many Promise Neighborhood grant awardees faced challenges with data access and collection, since FERPA requires written consent to access student information. The GAO also determined that the Department of Education did not link award grantees with federal programs and organizations that share Promise Neighborhood goals. Additionally, the Department of Education asks Promise Neighborhood grant awardees to collect data, but has no method to assess its validity. This makes it difficult to determine the effectiveness of Promise Neighborhood programs.

== Criticism ==
Promise Neighborhoods have received some criticism as both a school reform and as a community reform. William Julius Wilson acknowledged early in the initiative's life that knowing whether equity is being realized through the Promise Neighborhoods policy will take considerable time. A 2010 report by Whitehurst and Croft also offered speculation about the effectiveness of Promise Neighborhoods, saying that "there is no compelling evidence that investments in parenting classes, health services, nutritional programs, and community improvement in general have appreciable effects on student achievement".
