= Daryl Toh =

- Born: Daryl Toh Liem Zhan; April 15, 1986 (age 40) Malaysia
- Notable works: Tobias and Guy; Is'nana the Were-Spider; Cheater Code

Daryl Toh (born April 15, 1986) is a Malaysian comic book artist and writer. Toh first gained attention through his supernatural webcomic Tobias and Guy, published on his Tumblr account, and focusing on the relationship between the human Guy and demon Tobias. Toh would go on to work on various independent comics or self-published projects.

In 2018, Toh worked on the second volume of Greg Anderson-Elysée's Is'nana the Were-Spider, focusing on the son of mythological figure Anansi; the comic would win a Glyph Comics Award the following year. In 2020, Toh worked alongside Steve Foxe on the graphic novel Cheater Code, which was published by Oni Press.

Citing H. P. Lovecraft and Junji Ito as some of his inspirations, many of Toh's works connect to the horror genre and often include LGBT characters and themes in them.

== Early life ==
According to Toh, ever since he read the science fiction-horror novella At the Mountains of Madness, he became interested in H. P. Lovecraft's other works. Some of his inspirations as an artist include Mike Mignola, especially concerning horror, as well as Richard Corben, Tyler Crook, Guy Davis, Junji Ito, and Masahiro Ito.

== Career ==
Toh first gained notoriety through his Tumblr-based webcomic Tobias and Guy, which started in 2015, and focused on the human Guy and his demon boyfriend Tobias. ComicsVerse described the series as one of the best magical-themed LGBT webcomics, praising its ability to humorous and heartwarming, but also dealing with topics such as coming out, depression, and mourning. In the same year, Toh also worked as an artist on Luc Labelle's psychological horro graphic novel Outer God, based on the Cthulhu Mythos by H. P. Lovecraft. During the same year, Toh would work on another Cthulhu-inspired project, as an illustrator for Imp House Game Company' dice game Chaos of Cthulhu. In designing the Elder Gods, Toh attempted to ensure they resembled frescos.

Toh worked with comic writer Ryan King in 2016, on the horror comic The Games We Played. They would work again a second time in 2017, publishing the comic series Nico's Fortune, which was funded through Kickstarter. The comic was described as an LGBT-friendly horror story that took inspiration from films such as Rear Window and Fright Night. Another Kickstarter-funded project Toh worked on was the second volume of Greg Anderson-Elysée's Is'nana the Were-Spider. Anderson-Elysée had been a fan of Toh's Tobias and Guy and was amazed at a pin-up he had drawn, which started their friendship and resulted in Toh working on the comic. In 2019, during the 14th Glyph Comics Awards, an award ceremony recognizing the best comics created by and for people of colour, the comic won Story of the Year.

In 2018, Toh would again work with Imp House Game Company on the game Mad Love. Since 2019, Toh has been illustrating the webcomic Black Key Incubus, written by James Schleisman. The comic focuses on witch Norman Castor who in an attempt to prove his abilities summons forth a Caliban, a demonic prince participating in a battle royal. The two men quickly realize they are soulmates and begin a relationship, while attempting to navigate both of their supernatural-based issues.

As part of its Limerence Press imprint, which focuses on erotic and sex-education comics, Oni Press released Cheater Code in 2020, with Toh working alongside writer Steve Foxe. The graphic novel focuses on Kennedy who is a gamer and, after having a fight with his boyfriend, is sucked into his video game library. Foxe described the story as taking inspiration from Shortbus, wanting it to contain sex but also "real emotional undercurrent and [a] worthwhile story". In 2021, Toh worked alongside Caleb Palquist on another Kickstarter-funded comic titled Unicorn: Vampire Hunter.

In 2022 it was announced that Toh was working on the anthology title Young Men in Love, published by A Wave Blue World and featuring 20 different stories focuses on gay romances. All of the stories are written and illustrated by queer men and assigned male at birth non-binary individuals that are attracted to men. Toh worked on two stories; the pirate-themed "The Treasure Map to My Heart" written by Oliver Gerlach, and "Bright Idea" written by Charles Pulliam-Moore.

== Bibliography ==
- Tobias and Guy (also writer; 2015–2016)
- Outer God (with Luc Labelle; 2015)
- The Games We Played (with Ryan King; 2016)
- Nico's Fortune (with Ryan King; 2017)
- Is'nana the Were-Spider (with Greg Anderson-Elysée's; 2018)
- Black Key Incubus (with James Schleisman; 2019—present)
- Cheater Code (with Steve Foxe; 2020)
- Unicorn: Vampire Hunter (with Caleb Palmquist; 2021)
- Young Men in Love (2022)
