= Ariell Johnson =

American business owner

- Born: 1983 (age 42–43); Baltimore
- Education: Temple University (BBA)
- Occupation: Comic book retailer
- Known for: Amalgam Comics and Coffeehouse

Ariell Johnson is a business owner and accountant and is the first African-American to own a comic store on the east coast of the United States.

== Early life and education ==
Johnson was born in Baltimore, Maryland. Growing up, she originally wanted to be a dancer, and even auditioned for Philadanco. She earned her Bachelor of Business Administration in accounting from the Fox School of Business and Management at Temple University in 2005. While at school, she came up with the idea of opening a comic book shop, saying: "I enjoy accounting, but I couldn't do it all day, everyday. There's a part of me that loves sitting and staring at spreadsheets, but I need a creative aspect to my work."

As a child, Johnson recalls seeing the superhero Storm on television, which was "the first black woman heroine that [she] ever laid eyes on". Wanting to learn more about the character, she began reading comics.

== Career ==
Johnson opened Amalgam Comics and Coffeehouse in Kensington, Philadelphia in 2015. At the time of the store opening, there were only five comic stores in the country owned by African-Americans. Johnson emphasizes that "all are welcome" in her store, citing her own experiences shopping as a comic fan driving her to open Amalgam in the first place: "You feel scrutinized being the only person that looks like you."

The East Coast Black Age of Comics (ECBACC) closed out its 2016 convention in Amalgam Comics. In 2017, Johnson received a grant from the Knight Foundation to add programming space to the store where she could offer classes and other resources to assist aspiring comic book creators.

Amalgam Comics and Coffeehouse closed its storefront in October 2022 due to the loss of business from the COVID-19 pandemic. Johnson is hopeful to reopen a physical store in the future, citing the closure and re-opening of St. Mark's Comics in New York City as inspiration.

== Awards and recognition ==
- In 2016, Johnson was depicted on a variant cover of the November issue of The Invincible Iron Man #1 featuring Ironheart.
- In 2016, Johnson was nominated for Philadelphia's "Geek of the Year" award for offering "an inclusive and welcoming atmosphere for geeks of all kinds"
- In 2019, Johnson was awarded the "Jerry Clark Making a Difference Award" by the Anti-Defamation League in recognition of her efforts to make communities "more respectful, inclusive, and welcoming"
- In 2020, Johnson was awarded the "Equitable Entrepreneur Award" by the Philadelphia Association of Community Development Corporations
