= Richard J. Fox =

American property developer and philanthropist (1927–2020)

- Born: November 8, 1927; Philadelphia, Pennsylvania
- Died: February 9, 2020 (aged 92); Philadelphia, Pennsylvania
- Education: Central High School
- Alma mater: Georgia Institute of Technology
- Occupation: Property developer
- Years active: 1953 to 2020
- Board member of: Temple Board of Trustees
- Spouse: Geraldine Fox
- Children: Harry Fox, Jennifer Fox, Frederic Fox, Celia Fox, Michael Fox
- Parent(s): Fred Fox, Zena Witlin Fox

Richard James Fox (November 8, 1927 – February 9, 2020) was an American property developer, entrepreneur and philanthropist. He served as the Chairman of Fox Companies, a property construction, development and management company in Eastern Pennsylvania and Southern New Jersey, and Planalytics, a weather analytics company. He was a member of the Temple University Board of Trustees for 53 years and the Fox School of Business and Management was named after him. He co-founded the Republican Jewish Coalition.

== Early life ==
Richard J. Fox was born November 8, 1927. He grew up in the Germantown-Mount Airy neighborhoods of Philadelphia.

Fox was educated at the Central High School, a public high school from which he graduated in 1945. Fox enlisted in the Navy to serve in World War II, where he learned how to fly, which became a lifelong passion of his. He graduated from the Georgia Institute of Technology in 1950, where he received a bachelor of science degree in engineering. He served in the Korean War of 1950–1953.

== Career ==
Fox co-founded Fox Companies, a property construction, development and management firm in Eastern Pennsylvania and Southern New Jersey, with his brother Robert. He served as its Chairman. The firm has developed many buildings and apartment complexes, including the Wachovia Center in Philadelphia. Additionally, they developed the town of Chesterbrook, Pennsylvania.

Fox was chairman of Planalytics, a weather analytics company he established with his son Fred Fox in Berwyn, PA. He was also CEO of Quantum Pest Management, a revolutionary, non-chemical, insect management technology.

== Political activity ==
Fox co-founded the Republican Jewish Coalition, serving as its first Chairman and its honorary chairman. He was the Chairman of the Jewish Policy Center, a right-wing group which opposed the Israeli-Palestinian peace process. Fox was involved in several Republican presidential campaigns in the 1980s, including serving as the Pennsylvania State Chairman for Ronald Reagan's 1980 and 1984 presidential campaigns and the national finance chair of Jack Kemp's 1988 presidential campaign. In 1983, he criticized Reagan's policies towards Israel as not meeting the expectations of Jewish Republicans.

Fox served as the co-chairman of the New Horizon Council. He donated money to support the establishment of Freedom's Watch, a conservative lobbying group founded in 2007.

== Philanthropy ==
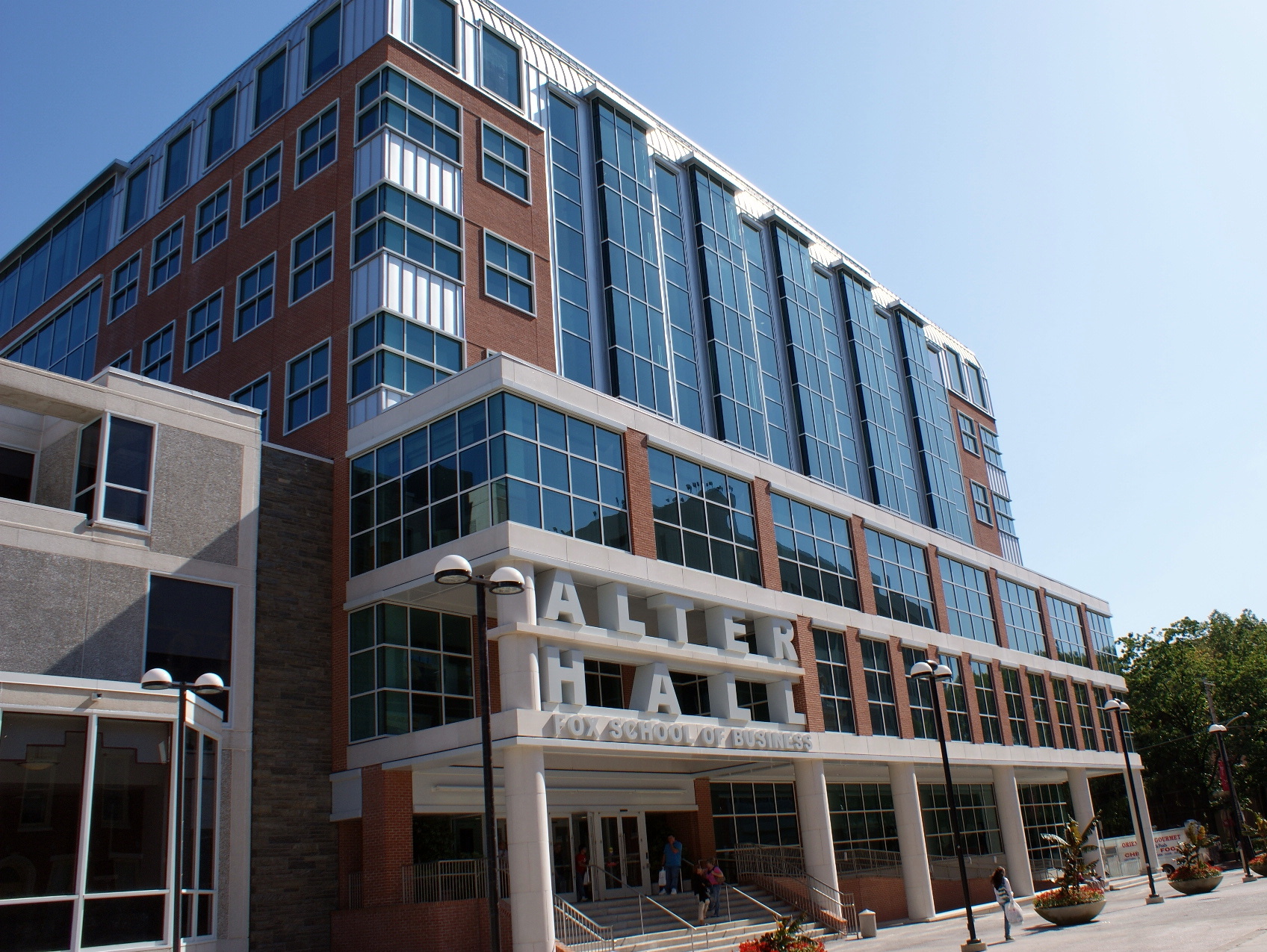
Alter Hall, home to the Fox School of Business and Management at Temple University.

Fox served on the Board of Trustees of Temple University continuously for 53 years. He served as its Chairman for 17 years from 1982 to 1999, when the Fox School of Business and Management was named in his honor. In 1987, he founded the Center for Frontier Sciences to study new scientific ideas. Martin Gardner criticized the center as promoting fringe science. Fox was the 1996 recipient of an honorary doctorate of humane letters.

== Death ==
Fox died from natural causes on February 9, 2020, in his Center City Philadelphia apartment at the age of 92.

== Personal life ==
Fox was married to his wife, Geraldine for 67 years. Together they had 5 children and 7 grandchildren. Fox flew planes for 64 years from the age of 17 until he stopped at the age of 81. He enjoyed politics, Jewish affairs and golf.
