= Gay Heart Throbs =

Underground comic

Cover of second issue, illustrated by Mike Kuchar.

Gay Heart Throbs was an underground comic featuring gay erotica. Only three issues were published, in 1976, 1979, and 1981. It has been described as the first gay comic. It was edited by Larry Fuller.

The short-lived comic struggled to find an audience. It has been compared to the more successful and influential Gay Comix, which debuted in 1980 and opted for more emotionally nuanced content, as opposed to the "campy erotica" of Gay Heart Throbs.

The title is thought to be a reference to Heart Throbs, a romance comic published from 1949 to 1972.

The second and third issue were illustrated by Mike Kuchar, who described the artwork in the first issue as "not good". Though already known as an underground filmmaker, Gay Heart Throbs was Kuchar's first job as an illustrator, and he was contacted for many more jobs involving erotic illustration on the strength of his work on the comic.
