= Turtel Onli =

American comics artist (1952–2025)

- Born: January 25, 1952 Chicago, Illinois, U.S.
- Died: January 15, 2025 (aged 72)
- Areas: Cartoonist, Writer, Artist
- Notable works: NOG, Protector of the Pyramides
- Awards: Glyph Comics Awards Pioneer Lifetime Achievement Award, 2006

Turtel Onli (January 25, 1952 – January 15, 2025), nee Alvin Phillips, was an American artist, businessman, author, art therapist, educator and publisher.

Over Onli's career, his work has touched upon a variety of disciplines in fine and applied visual art, producing works in painting, drawing, illustration, publishing, fashion, and multimedia production. Onli has authored and illustrated numerous comic books and graphic novels, including NOG, Protector of the Pyramids, Malcolm 10, Nog Nu and Grammar Patrol. He is known as "the Father" of the "Black Age of Comics," a movement dedicated to the promotion, creation, and support of Afrocentric comic books and graphic novels. Onli coined the term "Rhythmism" to define and interpret his stylizations, which fuse primitive and futuristic concepts. A retired public school art teacher, Onli worked in the Chicago Public Schools for more than two decades.

== Biography ==
=== Early life and education ===
Onli was born on January 25, 1952 and was raised by his grandparents, including the Reverend Samuel David Phillips, in the Hyde Park neighborhood in Chicago. Rev. Phillips created artistic depictions based on the bible and young Onli would pitch in. After graduating from high school in 1970, Onli earned an associate's degree from Olive-Harvey College. He then transferred to the School of the Art Institute of Chicago where he received a Bachelor of Fine Arts and later a Master of Arts in Art Therapy. His education includes studies in Paris, France, at The Sorbonne and the Centre Georges Pompidou.

=== Career ===
In 1970, Onli founded the Black Arts Guild (BAG), which featured touring art exhibitions and published work by its members. In 1974, in conjunction with BAG, he published Funk Book and a series of greeting cards. In 1980, he co-published a zine called PAPER with the Osun Center of the Arts. In the early 1980s he created five issues of another early comics zine, Future Funk.

Onli's illustration clients include Playboy Magazine, Chicago Magazine, Avant Garde Magazine, McDonald's, Motown Productions, Holt, Rinehart & Winston, MODE magazine, and Paris Métro magazine. His work is in the collections of Miles Davis, Alice Coltrane, the Chicago Children's Museum (The Rhythmistic Bench), and Johnson Publishing Company which, when he was 19, bought the first painting he sold.Onli has been a visiting artist at the University of Illinois at Chicago.

In 2005, Onli curated "Reverend Phillips and Turtel Onli: An Artistic and Spiritual Legacy," at the Center for the Visual and Performing Arts in Munster, Indiana, an exhibition featuring the visionary charts created by his late grandfather, the Rev. Samuel David Phillips, and Onli's own Rhythmistic paintings.

In 2010 he opened the new Onli Studios at the Bridgeport Arts Center in Chicago.

=== Educator ===
From 1984 to 1989, Onli worked as an art therapist with young people in Chicago's Robert Taylor Homes. He worked as an art instructor in the Chicago Public Schools.

Onli taught at Columbia College Chicago, and was an adjunct professor of Art Appreciation & Drawing at Harold Washington College.

Onli was also the founder of B.A.G the Black Arts Guild where his “Rhythmistic” style and approach provides a futuristic think tank for young emerging artist to evolve in various mediums.

=== Comics ===
Throughout his career, Onli has created Afrocentric Rhythmistic-powered characters who tap into humanity’s innate attraction to exaggeration, the supernatural, and pseudo-theological mythology. They represent Onli's belief in the ideal of the powerful defending the weak. He uses the "hero vs. villain" paradigm as his vehicle for reaching beyond “perceived” norms.

Onli's character NOG, Nubian of Greatness, one of the earliest Afrocentric comic book characters, was featured in the Chicago Defender, starting in 1979, before transitioning to the comic book NOG, Protector of the Pyramides from 1981-82. NOG returned in NOG is Back!! in 1994 and Nog Nu!! in 2011.

==== Black Age of Comics ====
In 1993, Onli spearheaded the inaugural Black Age of Comics convention at the Southside Community Arts Center in Chicago, where it was held for three consecutive years. Black Age of Comics Conventions have since been held in Atlanta, Los Angeles, and Detroit; with Philadelphia's annual ECBACC being the most prominent. Other recent Black Age of Comics conventions were held in Chicago's Bridgeport Arts Center and Kenwood Academy.

=== Death ===
Onli died on January 15, 2025, at the age of 72.

== Honors and awards ==
- 2006: Glyph Comics Awards Pioneer Award – for bringing positive, diverse images to the world of graphic novels and comic books

== Work ==
=== Bibliography ===
- NOG: Protector of the Pyramides (self-published, 1981–1982)
- Future Funk (BAG, 1980s)
- Malcolm 10 (self-published, 1992)
- Sustah-Girl (Castel Publications, 1993) – with Cassandra Washington
- Grammar Patrol (Castel Publications, 1994) – with Cassandra Washington
- Nog is Back (self-published, 1994)
- The Origins of Team Blanga: Heroes of the Black Age (Onli Studios, 2007) – includes an original CD soundtrack by Hardy Headz
- Let's Go Green in the City (Onli Studios, 2008)
- Sasa (Onli Studios, 2010)
- Nog Nu!! (Onli Studios, 2011)
- East/West Zodiac & Journal (Onli Studios) – with Kocao Winbush
- The Legend of the AZANIAC

=== Exhibitions ===
- 1977: Second World Festival of Black and African Art and Culture (FESTAC) (Lagos, Nigeria) – group show
- 1991: Prairie Avenue Gallery (Chicago, Illinois) – "The Return of Watermelon: The Redefining of a Stereotype" – group show
- 2001: The African American Cultural Center (Chicago)
- 2005: Center for the Visual and Performing Arts (Munster, Indiana) – “Reverend Phillips and Turtel Onli: An Artistic and Spiritual Legacy”
- 2006: The Kennedy center – "Turtel Onli as a Tortellini"
- 2007: "Cool Globes: Hot Ideas for a Cooler Planet Chicago" group show – "It'z A Rhythmsitic World." Never Boring!!!“
- 2011: Tubman African American Museum (Macon, Georgia) – "Afro Futurism in the Visual Arts" – group show
- 2011: ETA Creative Arts Foundation (Chicago) – “Passion Fruit: The Other Chicago Black Movement” – solo exhibition
- 2013: DuSable Museum of African American History (Chicago) – "AFRICOBRA: Art and Impact" – group show
- 2015: Harold Washington Library Center (Chicago) – Rhythmistic Journey: The Art Enterprises of Turtel Onli
- 2020: Hyde Park Arts Center (Chicago) "Rhythmistic Residency"
- 2024: Cafe Logan at the Reva and David Logan Center for the Arts (Chicago)
