= Prince of Cats (graphic novel) =

Graphic novel by Ronald Wimberly

- Cover of the 2012 edition
- Creator: Ronald Wimberly
- Page count: 144 pages
- Publisher: Vertigo (DC Comics)

Original publication
- Date of publication: 11 September 2012

Prince of Cats is a 2012 graphic novel by Ronald Wimberly. The story focuses on Tybalt, a character from Romeo and Juliet, and is set in 1980s New York. After being out of print for four years, the book was re-worked and re-released in 2016.

Legendary Entertainment won the filming rights to the graphic novel in July 2018, and Lakeith Stanfield was set to play the lead role of Tybalt. Spike Lee was attached to direct.
