= Paul Tough =

Canadian-American writer and broadcaster (born 1967)

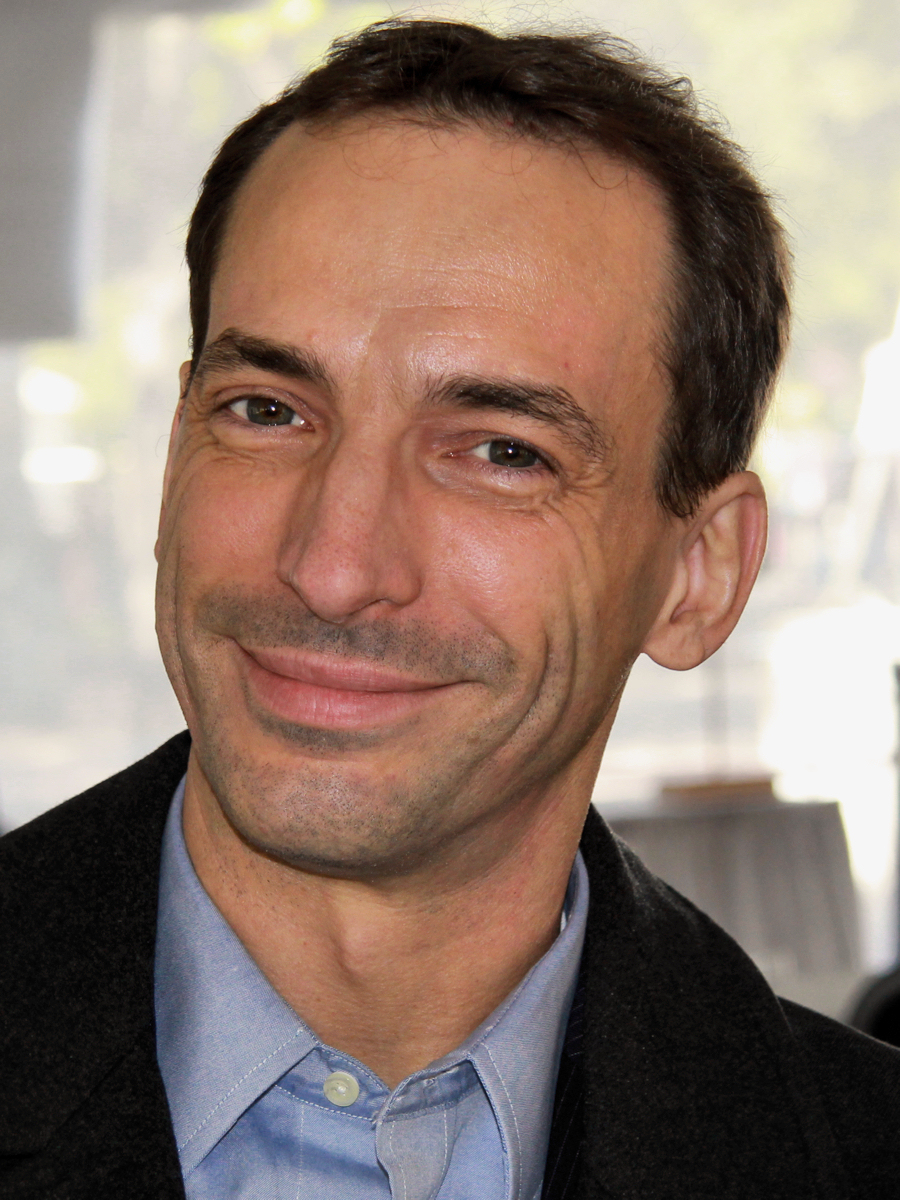
- Tough at the 2012 Texas Book Festival
- Born: 1967 (age 58–59)
- Occupations: Author, broadcaster, journalist

Paul Tough (born 1967) is a Canadian-American writer and broadcaster. He is best known for authoring the works Whatever It Takes: Geoffrey Canada's Quest to Change Harlem and America and How Children Succeed: Grit, Curiosity, and the Hidden Power of Character.

== Background and career ==
He grew up in Toronto and was educated at the University of Toronto Schools. As a teenager, he was co-host of Anybody Home, a weekly youth-oriented programme broadcast nationally on CBC Radio until the show's cancellation in 1983. He has also served as an editor of The New York Times Magazine.

Tough attended Columbia University for one semester in the fall of 1985. He then continued his studies at McGill University in Canada for three semesters. Ultimately, he left college without earning a degree. Tough moved back to the United States in 1988 and worked for Harper's Magazine. In 1990, he received the Livingston Award, along with Jack Hitt, for an article they wrote about computer hackers that was published in Esquire.

He returned to radio, becoming senior editor of This American Life. in the mid-1990s. In 1998, he returned to Canada to serve as editor of Saturday Night. By 2000, Tough had returned to the United States to found Open Letters, an online magazine.

He has written extensively about education, poverty and politics, including cover stories in the New York Times Magazine on the Harlem Children's Zone, the post-Katrina school system in New Orleans, the No Child Left Behind Act, and charter schools. He returned to This American Life in the early 2000s, where he reported, more recently, on the parents enrolled in the Harlem Children's Zone's Baby College. His writing has appeared in Slate, GQ, Esquire, and The New Yorker.

== Books ==
Tough is the author of Whatever It Takes: Geoffrey Canada's Quest to Change Harlem and America and How Children Succeed: Grit, Curiosity, and the Hidden Power of Character, which he published through Houghton Mifflin in 2008 and 2012 (respectively).

Whatever It Takes detailed the Harlem Children's Zone project, a multi-pronged effort within a ninety-seven block area of New York City founded in 1997 by Geoffrey Canada. Tough described how Canada has "believed that he could find the ideal intervention for each age of a child’s life, and then connect those interventions into an unbroken chain of support", with the Zone functioning as a social and economic "conveyor belt" working from children's birth to their college age. The New York Times ran a supportive review by Linda Perlstein of the National Education Writers Association; she wrote, "when it comes to an introduction to the debate about poverty and parenting in urban America, you could hardly do better than Tough’s book."

How Children Succeed built upon the work of James Heckman, University of Chicago economist and Nobel lauterate, that stated that education should focus more on promoting the psychological traits of "conscientiousness" among children at young ages rather than more IQ-related studies later in life. Tough wrote explicitly, "There is no anti-poverty tool that we can provide for disadvantaged young people that will be more valuable than character strengths". He cited research such as the famous Perry Preschool Project to state that nurturing, supportive personal relationships with adults in educational settings promote non-cognitive attributes that lead to higher incomes, less criminality, and other benefits, even when children face harsh early environments, to deliver a message that Tough found "a bit warm and fuzzy" but "rooted in cold, hard science". As a key example, he cites the work of Stanford psychologist Carol Dweck, who studied how students instructed that people can boost themselves intellectually get higher grades than those who believe in a fixed idea of intelligence.

The Washington Monthly ran a positive review by Thomas Toch, who stated that Tough made "a compelling case" in "an engaging book that casts the school reform debate in a provocative new light". The Boston Globe ran a supportive article by Jenifer B. McKim; she wrote, "In this concise book, Tough provides deep research, expert testimony, and eloquently described real-life characters to make his case."

== See also ==
- Harlem Children's Zone
- HighScope
