= Sentences: The Life of MF Grimm =

Graphic novel

- Date: September 5, 2007
- Publisher: Vertigo (DC Comics)

Creative team
- Writer: Percy Carey
- Artist: Ronald Wimberly
- Penciller: Ronald Wimberly
- Letterer: DC Lettering
- Colourist: Ronald Wimberly

Sentences: The Life of MF Grimm is a 2007 graphic novel written by hip hop artist Percy Carey, better known as MF Grimm. The comic details his life from childhood through his adult years, ending with the writing of the book. The story sees his highs and lows, as he suffers from a life of crime as well as being a recording artist. The comic has received two Eisner Award nominations, and two Glyph Awards.

== Background and creation ==
Carey came to write Sentences: The Life of MF Grimm after he was prompted by others to share his life story. Vertigo picked up the story and released it, drawn by Ronald Wimberly.

== Story ==
The plot of the comic follows the story of MF Grimm's life from early childhood in the 1970s to around the year 2006. Through that time period it follows his exploits, from working with some of hip hop's biggest stars, to being paralyzed in an assassination attempt, to being sentenced to life imprisonment, and finally being released after only three years served.
