= Ronald Wimberly =

American cartoonist and illustrator (born 1979)

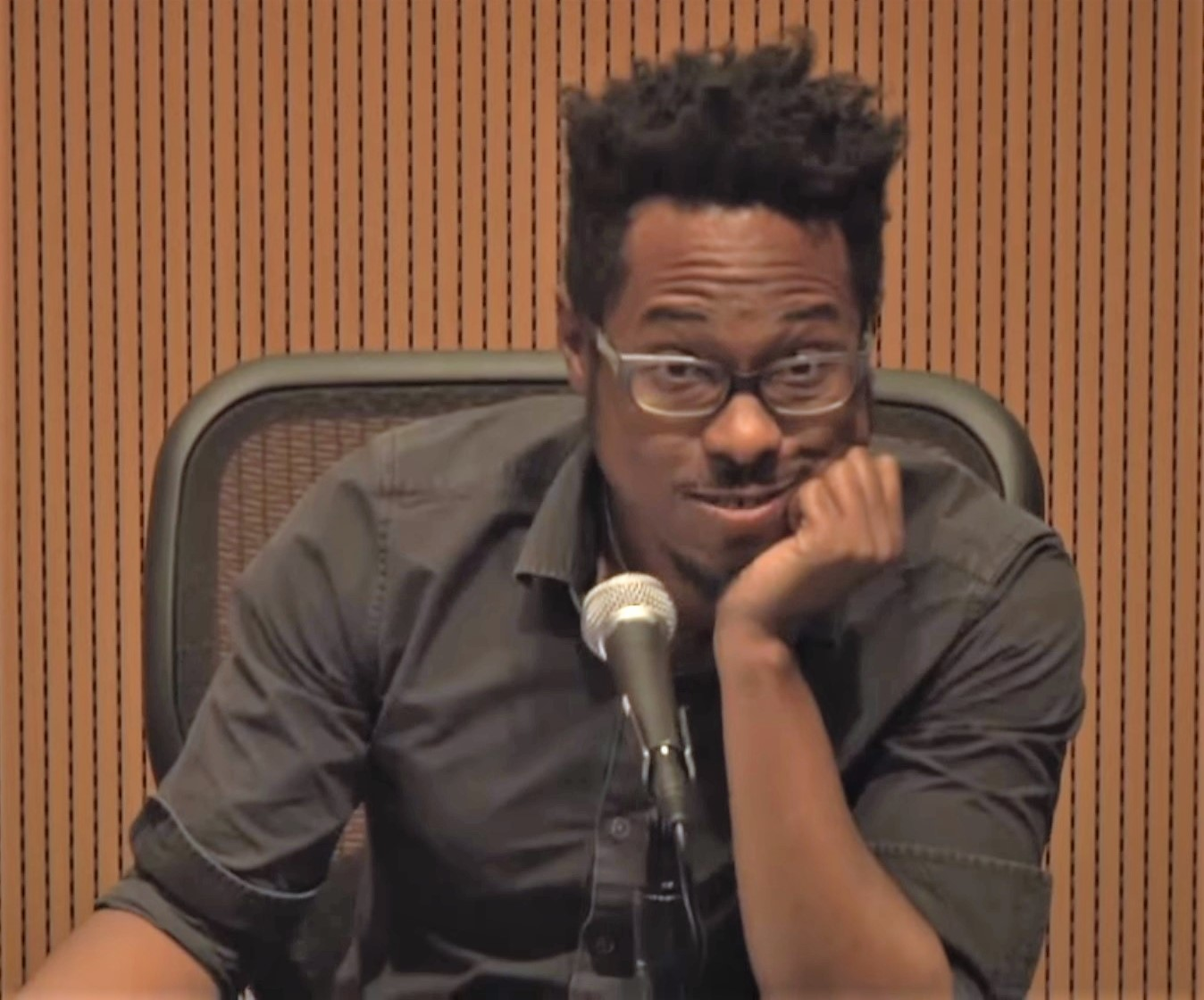
- Wimberly moderates a panel at Small Press Expo 2016
- Born: April 28, 1979 (age 47)
- Areas: Cartoonist, Artist
- Notable works: Sentences: The Life of MF Grimm; Prince of Cats "Lighten Up"
- Awards: see full list

Ronald Wimberly (born April 28, 1979) is an American cartoonist. He has published several graphic novels, as well as shorter works for The New Yorker, DC/Vertigo, Nike, Marvel, Hill and Wang, and Dark Horse Comics. Wimberly was the 2016 Columbus Museum of Art comics resident, and was a two-time resident cartoonist at Angoulême's Maison des Auteurs. He is the recipient of the 2008 Glyph Comics Award, and has been nominated for two Will Eisner Comic Industry Awards.

== Early life and education ==
Ronald Wimberly was born on April 28, 1979, and raised in and around Washington, D.C. He studied illustration in Brooklyn at Pratt Institute from 1997 to 2001, and now lives and works in New York City.

== Career ==
Wimberly's first professional published work was Gratuitous Ninja: Tangerine which was published in the 2004 Dark Horse Comics anthology Strip Search. Wimberly quickly established a reputation as a cartoonist and storyteller with a particular interest in physical action and human anatomy, and in stories exploring narrative subjectivity. By 2007, he had worked for various companies as an artist and designer on a number of titles, including Swamp Thing, Lucifer, Metal Hurlant, Deadman and Dark Horse Presents.

In 2007, Wimberly illustrated his first book-length project, Sentences: The Life of MF Grimm, a collaborative graphic memoir written by the hip hop artist Percy Carey (better known as MF Grimm), and released by DC/Vertigo. Sentences was nominated for two 2008 Eisner Awards, and received two 2008 Glyph Awards (for Best Story and Best Cover).

In 2012, Wimberly created, wrote and illustrated his first solo graphic novel, Prince of Cats, a modern urban remix of Romeo and Juliet. It was released by DC/Vertigo to wide acclaim, and later come out in a hardcover edition from Image Comics.

Following a stint on Marvel's She-Hulk, Wimberly wrote and illustrated a comic for The Nib entitled "Lighten Up," in which he analyzed the approach to race, skin color, and continuity by the Marvel Comics editorial team, as well as the comics industry in general. The strip was widely read and discussed, and was nominated for a Will Eisner Comics Industry Award for Best Digital Comic.

In 2016, Image Comics announced an ongoing partnership with Wimberly that included the new edition of Prince of Cats, 2017's Black History In Its Own Words, and several other forthcoming projects.

In 2018 Prince of Cats was optioned for cinematic adaptation by Legendary Entertainment, and is now in development by screenwriter Selwyn Hinds with actor Lakeith Stanfield attached to star. Wimberly has also created LAAB, an ongoing newspaper-format art magazine, a "pop-culture dialectic".

Wimberly's forthcoming books include Slave Punk and Sunset Park for Image Comics, and the ongoing project LAAB Magazine for Beehive Books.

== Awards and honors ==
- 2008 – Eisner Award nominee for Best Reality-Based Work (for Sentences)
- 2008 – Glyph Award for Best Cover (for Sentences)
- 2008 – Glyph Award for Best Story (for Sentences)
- 2016 – Eisner Award nominee for Best Digital Comic (for "Lighten Up")
- 2015 – Angoulême Maison Des Auteurs Cartoonist In Residence
- 2016 – Angoulême Maison Des Auteurs Cartoonist In Residence
- 2016 – Graphic Novel Residency - Columbus Museum of Art
- 2019 – Eisner Award nominee for LAAB Magazine No. 0: Dark Matter, edited by Ronald Wimberly and Josh O'Neill (Beehive Books)
- 2020 – Eisner Award nominee forLAAB Magazine, vol. 4: This Was Your Life, edited by Ronald Wimberly and Josh O’Neill (Beehive Books)
- 2024 – Eisner Award nominee for LAAB Magazine, vol. 2: Eat / Shit edited by Ronald Wimberly and Josh O’Neill (Beehive Books); designed by Chloe Scheffe and Natalie Shields.

== Bibliography ==
- Wimberly, Ronald; Johnson, Mat (2006). Hellblazer: Papa Midnight limited series. Written by Mat Johnson. USA: DC Comics. ISBN 978-1401210038.
- Wimberly, Ronald (September 5, 2007). Sentences. Written by Percey Carey. USA: DC Comics. ISBN 978-1401210465.
- Wimberly, Ronald (2016). Prince of Cats. USA: Image Comics. ISBN 978-1632159267.
- (January, 2014) Mighty Avengers Vol. 2; issue #3. Variant cover
- (June 11, 2014) She-Hulk Vol. 3; issue #5. Pencils and inks.
- (July 16, 2014) She-Hulk Vol. 3; issue #6. Pencils, inks, and colors.
- (July 2014) All-New Ultimates Vol 1; issue 2. Variant cover
- (August, 2014) Superior Foes of Spider-Man Vol 1; issue #12. Cover art
- (October 15, 2014) Wolverine & the X-Men Vol. 2; issue #10; pages 6–11. Artist
- — (March 18, 2015). Bors, Matt (ed.). "Lighten Up". Classic Comics. The Nib.
- —; Wimberly, Ronald (August 24, 2015). Mouly, Francoise (ed.). "Ten Years After". Comic Strip. The New Yorker. Condé Nast.
- —; Wimberly, Ronald (October 5, 2016). Mouly, Francoise (ed.). "A Radio Station Takes Root Inside an Old Shipping Container in Brooklyn". Culture Desk. The New Yorker. Condé Nast.
- Wimberly, Ronald (2017). Black History in Its Own Words (Print ed.). Image Comics. ISBN 978-1534301535.
- Wimberly, Ronald, ed. (2018). "Various". LAAB Magazine. No. Dark Matter.
- Wimberly, Ronald, ed. (2019). "Various". LAAB Magazine. No. 4: This Was Your Life!.
- Wimberly, Ronald, ed. (2020). "Various". LAAB Magazine. No. 2: Eat / Shit.
- Wimberly, Ronald (2020). GratNin: KGMR. LAAB LLC.
- — (December 28, 2020). "Pandemic paper doll". Comics. The New Yorker. Vol. 96, no. 42. pp. 42–43.
- — (January 17, 2022). "King Arrested for Loitering, 1958". Art. The New Yorker. Vol. 97, no. 45. pp. cover.
- Wimberly, Ronald; Revel, Brahm (2023). Now Let Me Fly. Macmillan. ISBN 9781626728523.
- Wimberly, Ronald (2024). GratNin: KGMR (Print ed.). Beehive Books.
