= Harlem Children's Zone =

American nonprofit organization

Harlem Children's Zone, Inc.
- Founded: 1990
- Founder: Geoffrey Canada
- Purpose: Combating effects of poverty; improving child and parent education
- Location: New York City
- Region served: Harlem
- Method: Donations
- Key people: Geoffrey Canada, President and first CEO, Kwame Owusu-Kesse, current CEO
- Website: hcz.org

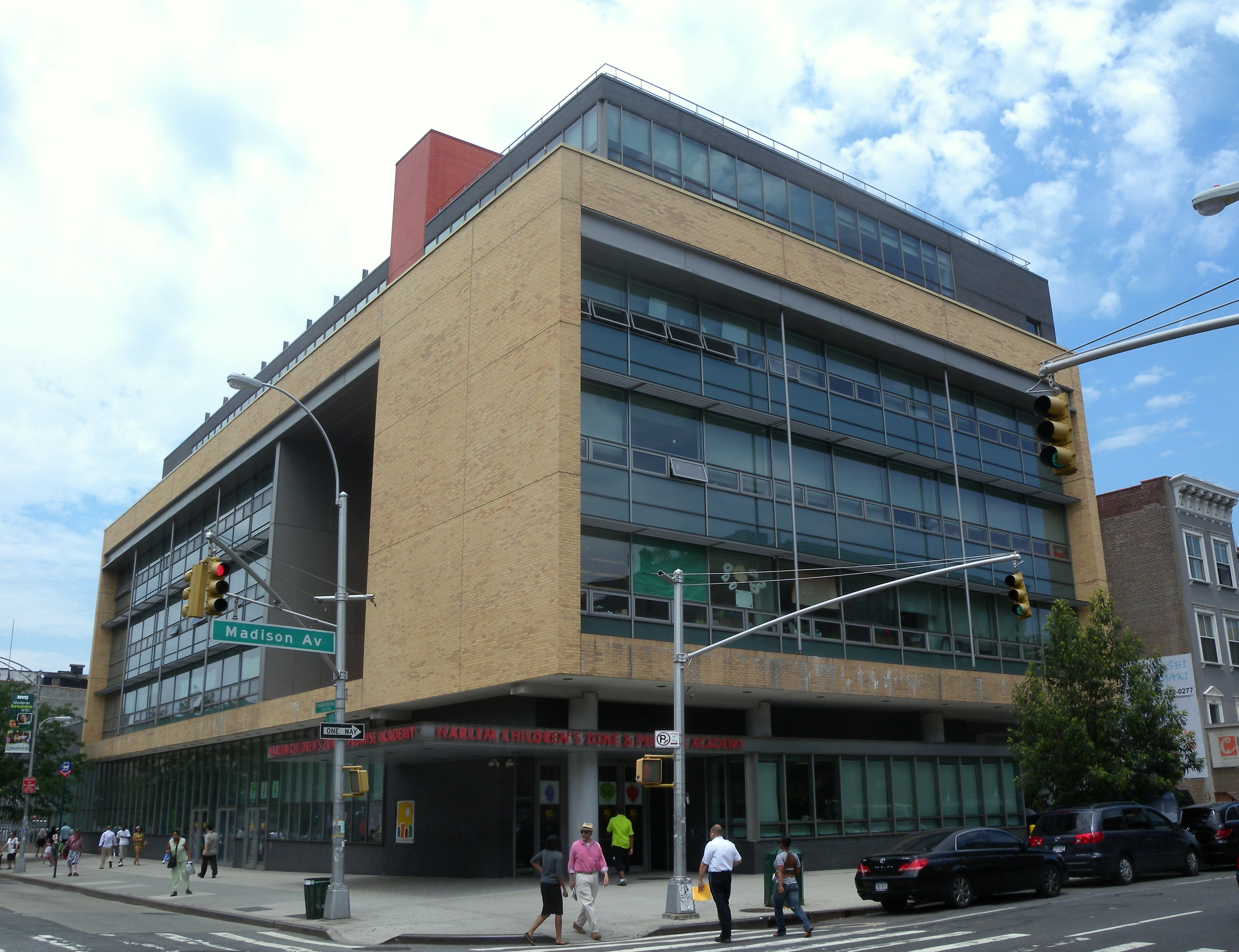
Harlem Children's Zone and Promise Academy

The Harlem Children's Zone (HCZ) is a nonprofit organization for children and families living in Harlem, providing free support in the form of parenting workshops, a preschool program, three charter schools, and child-oriented health programs for thousands of children and families. The HCZ is "aimed at doing nothing less than breaking the cycle of generational poverty for the thousands of children and families it serves."

The Harlem Children's Zone Project has expanded the HCZ's comprehensive system of programs to nearly 100 blocks of Central Harlem and aims to keep children on track through college and into the job market. "We’re not interested in saving a hundred kids," founder Geoffrey Canada says. "Even three hundred kids. Even a thousand kids to me is not going to do it. We want to be able to talk about how you save kids by the tens of thousands, because that’s how we’re losing them."

The Obama administration announced a Promise Neighborhoods program, which hopes to replicate the success of the HCZ in under resourced areas of other U.S. cities. In the summer of 2010, the U.S. Department of Education's Promise Neighborhoods program accepted applications from over 300 communities for $10 million in federal grants for developing HCZ implementation plans.

== Principles and programs ==
The HCZ designs, funds, and operates a holistic system of education, social-services and community-building programs in Harlem to counter the negative influences of crime, drugs and poverty and help children complete college and go on to the job market. Providing this "full network of services... to an entire neighborhood from birth to college" is a key element of the Obama administration's Promise Neighborhoods program modeled after the HCZ.

The two fundamental principles of The Zone Project are to help kids as early in their lives as possible and to create a critical mass of adults around them who understand what it takes to help children succeed.

Components of the HCZ programs include the following:

- The Baby College, a series of workshops for parents of children ages 0–3
- All-day pre-kindergarten
- Extended-day charter schools (Promise Academy)
- Health clinics and community centers for children and adults during after-school, weekend and summer hours
- Youth violence prevention efforts
- Social services such as a foster-care prevention service
- After-school programs equipped with academic resources and extracurricular activities
- College admissions and retention support
- Post-high school programs aimed to help students during their college years and beyond
- Hosting and speaking at summits and conferences dedicated to improving educational outcomes among children

Through its "pipeline program design", the Harlem's Children Zone ensures that a child is never neglected; having a range of programs that are geared and targeted to both the parents, and children for every stage in life. In addition to early childhood programs, such as Baby College, mentioned above, The Harlem's Children Zone has programs for school aged children through its Promise Academy K-12 Charter Schools. The comprehensive and wholesome programs that are available to not only the students, but the parents of students, in the Promise Academy include counseling and benefits assistance. Not all students are able to be granted admission to the Promise Academy K-12 Charter Schools, students are accepted based on a lottery system. Children within the Harlem's Children Zone who are not chosen through the lottery system can participate in programs such as Peacemakers, which provides academic support to thousands of students in the various public schools in the zone. Physical, mental, and emotional well-being of children are ensured through other programs such as the Case Management program for middle-school aged children; this program assigns an HCZ staff member to monitor a child's progress. Past the K-12 system, students receive help from the Harlem Children's Zone College Success Office, which helps students become not only high school graduates, but college graduates.

== Replication in other cities ==
A number of large U.S. cities have initiated their own programs styled after the HCZ, in advance of any federally funded efforts stemming from the Obama administration's HCZ-inspired anti-poverty initiatives. Philadelphia, Miami, Chicago, Cleveland, North Carolina and cities in Maryland are planning or considering HCZ replication.

Author Paul Tough has discussed the HCZ replication proposal.

The HCZ, in partnership with PolicyLink, organized a two-day conference on November 9–10, 2009 in New York City with the aim of providing guidance to community leaders from around the U.S. in their efforts to launch similar, large-scale projects like the HCZ in their areas.

In 2008 President Obama, inspired by the Harlem Children's Zone immense progress toward breaking the generational cycle of poverty, proposed the creation of Promise Neighborhoods. Obama's commitment to alleviating poverty is put into place with this initiative which uses HCZ's "cradle to college" approach. "The initiative seeks to help selected local communities dramatically improve outcomes and opportunities for children and families in defined neighborhoods. The initiative will be diverse in its application, reflecting local needs and context." The initiative's goal follows the HCZ's paradigm to improve every aspect of life in impoverished communities, its purpose states: "all children growing up in Promise Neighborhoods have access to effective schools and strong systems of family and community support that will prepare them to attain an excellent education and successfully transition from college to career." This purpose statement directly reflects the mission of HCZ. HCZ, in collaboration with the national action institute PolicyLink, assists in providing ongoing guidance for the Obama administration in this initiative.

In 2010, the Obama administration allocated $75 million in the federal budget for the program. More than 330 communities across the nation applied for Promise Neighborhood planning grants. Twenty-one communities were awarded one-year grants between $400,000 and $500,000. Planning grantees are given a year to produce a strategic paradigm which will address the issues specific to their community in pursuit of an implementation grant. The grantees submitted their plans that summer, with the implementation phase for Promise Neighborhoods expected to begin in September 2011.

== Media coverage ==
The 60 Minutes television program profiled the HCZ, including an interview with founder Geoffrey Canada, on May 14, 2006 and a follow-up program on December 6, 2009. Canada has also appeared twice in televised interviews with Charlie Rose on January 2, 2008 and June 22, 2004, and with Stephen Colbert on December 8, 2008, July 20, 2009, and January 4, 2011.

The New York Times ran an article on October 12, 2010, "Lauded Harlem Schools Have Their Own Problems", in which they exposed the "low student performance in most of the neighborhood's public schools" and the dismissal, by the board of trustees, of an entire class of 8th graders when their performance was deemed "too weak to found a high school on." They also report that "because it lost more ground than comparable schools, it got a C from the city on its annual A-to-F report card, and an F in the student progress category," while giving credit for the increased math scores of many students in the school.

The U.S. radio show This American Life produced an episode about the HCZ which aired on September 26, 2008, October 11, 2008, and August 14, 2009.

Barack Obama announced his plan in a 2008 presidential campaign speech in Washington, D.C., to replicate the HCZ in 20 cities across the United States. Federal government would provide half of the funding with the rest coming from philanthropy and businesses at a cost of a few billion per year. Senator Obama also noted the HCZ in a 2007 campaign speech.

The Wall Street Journal featured the HCZ in an article about the financial troubles experienced by this and other charitable organizations in the wake of the recession. The HCZ initiated a 100-day public service campaign started on January 23, 2009 to help counteract the effects of the economic downturn.

An article in the January/February 2009 issue of Mother Jones showcases Geoffrey Canada, the HCZ, and its recognition by the Obama 2008 presidential campaign and administration. The author of this article, Paul Tough, published a book in August 2008 about the HCZ titled, Whatever It Takes: Geoffrey Canada's Quest to Change Harlem and America.

National Public Radio produced a 30-minute story on the HCZ on 28 July 2009 titled "Harlem Children's Zone Breaks Poverty Pattern."

The Washington Post published a story about the HCZ on 2 August 2009, noting that the Obama administration has set aside $10 million in the 2010 budget for planning its Promise Neighborhoods program, which seeks to replicate the HCZ.

18 March 2010, the HCZ was covered in the BBC's flagship Today programme with a view to possible recreation in Great Britain.

=== Waiting for Superman ===
The HCZ and its promotion as a model of education to aspire to, especially in the recent documentary Waiting for "Superman", have been criticized as an example of the privatization of education in the U.S. University of San Francisco Adjunct Professor in Education Rick Ayers writes that Waiting for "Superman" "never mentions the tens of millions of dollars of private money that has poured into the Harlem Children's Zone, the model and superman we are relentlessly instructed to aspire to." One year after this film was made, the Grassroots Education Movement made a film titled The Inconvenient Truth Behind Waiting for Superman, which accused the original film of exaggerating the success of the HCZ.

== Evaluation ==
In part because not enough time has passed, there is not evidence available to know whether the HCZ achieves its central goal of ending intergenerational poverty.

HCZ has had many impacts, on its students, community, and federal programs. President Obama created a grant program to copy HCZ's block-by-block approach to ending poverty. Obama requested $210 million for the program.

Thirty-eight percent of Promise Academy I's students in third through sixth grade passed the 2010 English test, placing it in the lower half of charter schools citywide and below the city's overall passing rate of 42 percent. It outperformed Harlem as a whole, where just 29 percent of children passed.

Promise Academy II, an elementary school that occupies part of a public school building, did better, with 62 percent passing in English, among the top 10 percent of charters. But because it lost more ground than comparable schools, it got a C from the city on its annual A-to-F report card and an F in the student progress category. Both schools continued to outperform the city in math, with 60 percent passing in one school and 81 percent in the other.

One Harvard study found that Promise Academy students who entered the sixth grade in 2005 had raised their test scores so much by the eighth grade that they had "reversed the black-white achievement gap in mathematics" and reduced it in English. In 2009, nearly all the students passed the math test.

HCZ's after-school college advice office has helped place 650 students in college. Its asthma initiative has drastically reduced emergency room visits and missed school days among its 1,000 participants. Preschool students have made bounds in kindergarten readiness. Parent satisfaction in the charter schools, as measured by city surveys, is high.

A Brookings report finds that the HCZ increased middle school math test scores more than other academic indicators, yet it finds inconclusive data to support the holistic approach taken by the HCZ. For elementary school years, however, some research has concluded that the HCZ has positive impacts on both math and English language arts.

A March 2010 report in City Limits discusses the "stunning rate of teacher turnover the Promise Academies have posted. In 2006-07, a third of Promise Academy I's teachers left or were dismissed. The year before 48 percent were fired or quit. Only one of the original teachers is still with the Promise Academy middle school." It goes on to quote the treasurer of the board of the HCZ, Mitch Kurz as saying, "We developed a lot of grand plans, educational philosophies, and we overlooked sort of the fundamental aspect of running a successful school, and that is managing the culture of the school."

== See also ==
- AmeriCorps VISTA
- War on Poverty
- Fist, Stick, Knife, Gun (memoir)
