= Jai Gulati =

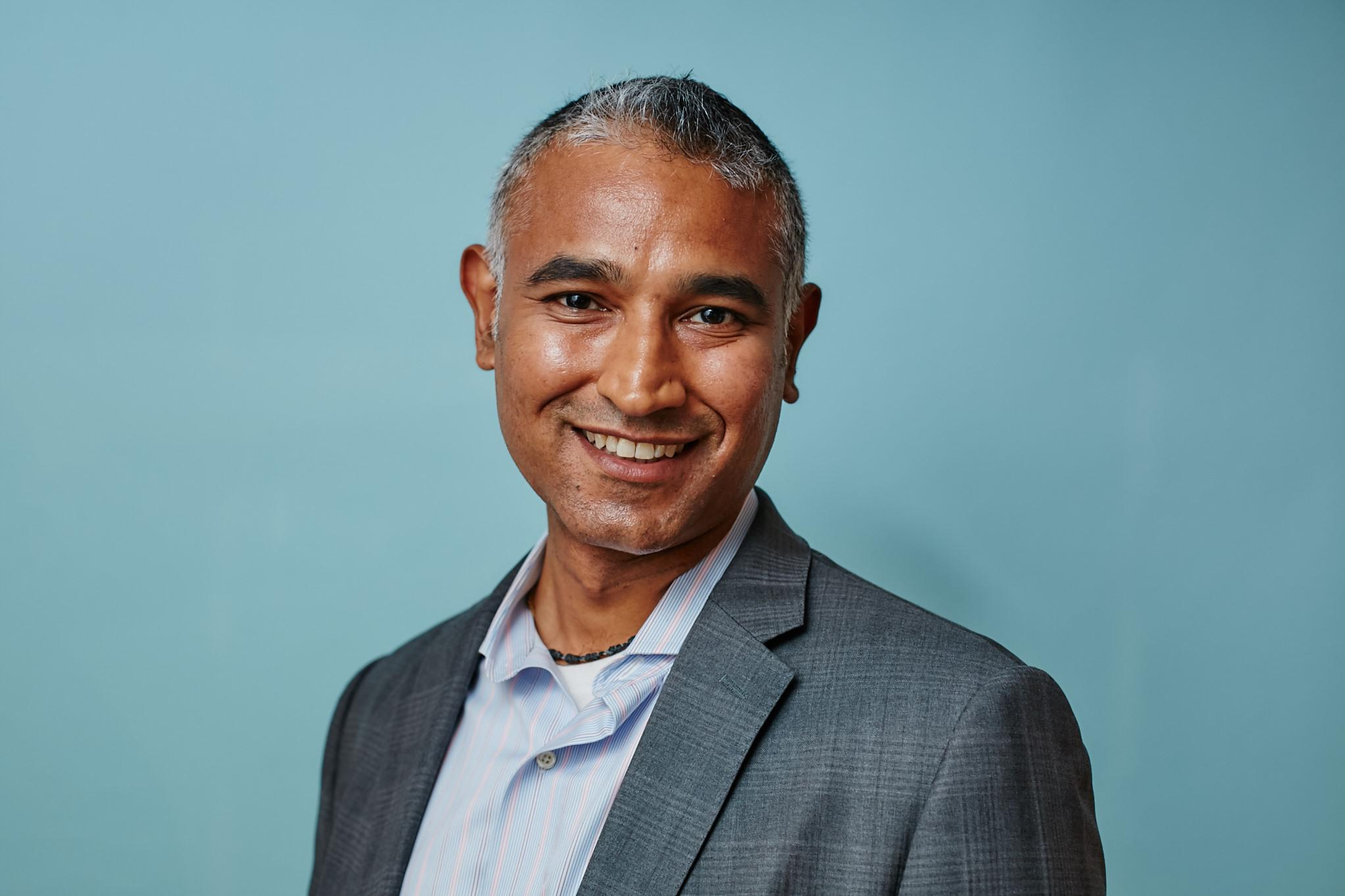
Jai Gulati

Jai Gulati is an Indian born management professional and was the CEO of Systel Inc., a Global Professional Services Company. He also serves on the boards of educational institution and non-profit organizations.

== Early life and education ==
Gulati has completed BA in economics with a minor in Computer Science from Stony Brook University. He is also an alumnus of Cornell University and completed his master's degree in business management from Temple University - Fox School of Business and Management.

== Career ==
After his graduation, Gulati has worked at Information technology operations, talent management and leadership positions at TD Ameritrade, NASDAQ, Comcast and BlackRock. Gulati took over as CEO of Systel in 2016 to help the company in driving towards its strategic goals & exited the company in 2018.

Apart from his business responsibilities, he is on the EMBA Alumni Advisory Board of Temple University and also serves as a career advisor for Stony Brook University.

== Awards and recognitions ==
- Received USPAACC Fast 100 Asian American companies in 2016
- Received USPAACC Fast 100 Asian American companies in 2017
