= Center for Child and Family Health =

U.S. nonprofit organization

The Center for Child and Family Health (CCFH) is a collaboration between Duke University, The University of North Carolina at Chapel Hill, North Carolina Central University, Child & Parent Support Services, and the community, created to improve prevention and treatment of childhood trauma. Founded in 1996, CCFH has benefited approximately 16,000 children through direct treatment and established training programs. In addition to services delivered in the state of North Carolina, CCFH has provided assistance in the aftermath of national tragedies such as 9/11 and Hurricane Katrina.

== Services and programs ==
Prevention
CCFH focuses its attention on the prevention of child abuse and neglect in children between the ages of 0–5. Through Healthy Families Durham, an intensive, home-based support program for low-income, high risk families, CCFH works to prevent child abuse, identify special needs, and promote child health and development. Through the Durham Connects program, nurses conduct home visits with families with newborns to identify whether they are at risk and to provide referrals for medical and community-based resources. Additional parent-focused interventions include the Attachment and Biobehavioral Catchup, Parent Child Interaction Therapy, Child Parent Psychotherapy and the Incredible Years. The center is a leader in the East Durham Children's Initiative, which is a local replication and implementation of the Harlem Children's Zone.

Training
CCFH has directed a range of training programs including the Period of Purple Crying: Keeping Babies Safe in North Carolina, which aims to reduce traumatic brain injuries in infants. Another program, the North Carolina Domestic Violence and Children Training Academy, resulted in a toolkit and online courses through the NC Area Health Education Centers designed to improve capacities of domestic violence shelter and agency staff to screen, intervene and refer children experiencing distress related to their exposure to violence and other adverse events. CCFH has applied collaborative learning and quality improvement methods to dissemination of best practices for the treatment of child traumatic stress and is a partner in the Duke Evidence Based Practice Implementation (EPIC) and the North Carolina Child Treatment Program with the University of North Carolina Chapel Hill.

Treatment
CCFH offers direct psychiatric services in the community including parent-child interaction therapy, structured psychotherapy for adolescents responding to chronic stress, child–parent psychotherapy for family violence, trauma focused cognitive behavioral therapy, abuse focused cognitive behavioral therapy and trauma focused coping, which was developed by CCFH faculty in response to an industrial disaster. In 2001, the US Office for Victims of Crime highlighted CCFH as one of the most effective child treatment centers in the US. In addition, CCFH creates partnerships to maximize effectiveness and outreach. For example, CCFH currently collaborates with Durham police officers as part of the North Carolina Child Response Initiative (NCCRI) to reduce the effects of violence on children. Due to the success of this program, a 2007 report recommended an expansion in its comprehensive gang assessment.

Legal
The legal program addresses the complex legal needs of families served by CCFH and provides current legal information to CCFH staff. The legal director is made available by North Carolina Central University School of Law through its Clinical Programs Department. The program offers legal support to all of the CCFH programs, and works to expand the program's involvement on a university, state and national scale. Furthermore, the legal program focuses on state policy related to child well-being, training on mental health law and expert witness testimony, and court preparation for child witnesses.

== Research and publications ==
CCFH is designated by the National Child Traumatic Stress Network as a Community Treatment and Services Center. Through this designation, CCFH bridges the gap between community-based practice and research on empirically proven interventions for childhood trauma. The center has multiple publications by faculty and staff including:

- The Child Status Index
- Child Maltreatment:What We're Learning and Where We're Going
- Dissociation Predicts Later Attention Problems in Sexually Abused Children
- Evidence-Based Psychosocial Treatment for Children and Adolescents Exposed to Traumatic Events
- Improving Law Enforcement Response and Mental Health Services for Child Trauma Victims in North Carolina
- The Durham Family Initiative:A Preventive Care System
