= Larry Fuller (cartoonist) =

American underground comix writer

- Areas: Writer, Penciller, Inker, Editor, Publisher
- Pseudonyms: A. Christian Black; A. Christian White
- Notable works: Ebon; White Whore Funnies; Gay Heart Throbs; The New Funny Book
- Awards: Glyph Comics Awards Pioneer Award, 2007

Larry Fuller is an African-American underground comix writer, publisher, and promoter. Along with other such notables as Richard "Grass" Green, Guy Colwell, and Fuller's long-time business partner and friend, Raye Horne, Fuller made sure that the voices of black comic book creators were heard in a time when their artistic efforts were largely ignored. On the topics of race and sexuality, Fuller mastered the art of delivering social commentary in humorous form.

== Biography ==
=== Military service ===
In the mid-1960s Fuller served with the U.S. Air Force at the Strategic Air Command Minot Air Force Base, in North Dakota.

=== Ebon and early career ===
Moving to the San Francisco Bay Area (the heart of the underground comix industry), in his late twenties, Fuller came up with the idea of an "authentic" African-American superhero, Ebon. After searching for an artist for more than a year, Fuller took art classes with the assistance of the G.I. Bill, and then ended up drawing Ebon himself, "swiping" many poses from established superhero artists like Gil Kane and John Buscema. Ebon #1 was published in January 1970 by Gary Arlington. (The back cover was a house ad for Arlington's comic book shop, the San Francisco Comic Book Company, an epicenter of the underground comix movement). Ebon is considered by many to be the first comic book title to star a black superhero (Marvel's Black Panther predating Ebon but not having his own title). Nonetheless, Ebon was a bad fit with the largely white, adult audiences of underground comix, and didn't meet with much success.

Shortly afterward, Fuller (in the guise of "Hairy" Larry Fuller) adapted H.P. Lovecraft's "The Ter'ble Old Man" for Last Gasp's 1971 comic Laugh in the Dark #1.

=== Ful-Horne Productions ===
In 1975, Fuller teamed up with Raye Horne to form Ful-Horne Productions (later known as Fulhorne), putting out the sex-themed comics White Whore Funnies and the then ground-breaking Gay Heart Throbs. White Whore Funnies was produced on high-quality paper; it was one of the few underground comics to also be distributed in porn shops. Fuller and Horne also published the anthology series The New Funny Book from 1975 to 1978, which featured contributions by artists such as Danny Bulanadi, Alex Niño (issue #2 cover), Nestor Redondo (issue #3 cover), Dan O'Neill, Ian Akin, and numerous others.

Later forming Fuller Inkwell, Fuller went on to periodically publish other sex-themed titles, such as Adults Only! (1979–1987) and HandJob Library (1991).

== Awards ==
In 2007, Fuller was the recipient of the Pioneer Award at the 2007 Glyph Comics Awards.

== Bibliography ==
Publisher

- The New Funny Book (3 issues, Ful-Horne/Fulhorne/Larry Fuller Presents, 1975–1978)
- White Whore Funnies (3 issues, Fuller Inkwell, 1975–1979)
- Gay Heart Throbs (also known as Gay Heartthrobs) (3 issues, Ful-Horne Productions, 1976–1981)
- Adults Only! (3 issues, Fuller Inkwell, 1979–1987)
- HandJob Library (Fuller Inkwell, 1991)

Writer/artist

- Ebon (Gary Arlington, 1970)
- "H.P. Lovecraft's The Ter'ble Old Man," Laugh in the Dark #1 (Last Gasp, 1971)
- "Draw!" (Kid Cunt), White Whore Funnies #2 (Fuller Inkwell, 1978)

Writer

- "Big Guns on the Panseyrosa" (Kid Cunt), Gay Hearthrobs #1 (Ful-Horne Productions, 1975)
- "Egad! The Fantastic Hunter" and "Lorok" (art by Danbold [Danny Bulanadi]), The New Funny Book #2 (Fulhorne, 1977)
- "The Ballad of Kid Sadistic" and "The Wild Sex Fantasy of Mrs. White" (art by James Davis), White Whore Funnies #2 (Fuller Inkwell, 1978)
- "Some Tight White Ass" (pornographic limericks illustrated by James Davis), White Whore Funnies #3 (Fuller Inkwell, 1979)

Inker

- The Decorator (written and illustrated by "Grass" Green) (Eros Comix, 1992)
- Horny No. 4,"Up from The Ghetto! Part 4", "Honey-Talk Tomson in One Horrible Lonely Night...", (written and illustrated by "Grass" Green) (Rip Off Press, 1992)
