= The Artblog =

Former arts publication in Philadelphia

The Artblog (styled Artblog) was a nonprofit online arts publication based in Philadelphia, founded in 2003 by Roberta Fallon and Libby Rosof to cover the city's visual arts scene. The outlet announced its closure in June 2025 after more than 20 years of publication, though its website remains accessible as an archive.

== History ==
Artblog launched in 2003 as a blog by artists and critics Roberta Fallon and Libby Rosof and expanded over time to include guest writers, interns, and contributing editors. It published reviews, interviews, and the "Artblog Radio" podcast. In 2011–2013, Artblog collaborated with WHYY/NewsWorks to distribute the podcast, with support from the Knight Foundation and J-Lab/William Penn funding.

In 2014, Rosof stepped down from active editing but continued to serve on the board, while Fallon remained as the executive director and editor. In May 2025, WHYY and The Philadelphia Inquirer reported that Artblog would shut down. The site posted a farewell on June 30, 2025. The publication has been selected for preservation in the University of Pennsylvania's Fisher Fine Arts Library Web Archive.

== Content ==
Artblog published exhibition reviews, artist and curator interviews, features, comics, and the "Artblog Radio" podcast.
