= Fist, Stick, Knife, Gun =

1995 memoir by Geoffrey Canada

- Author: Geoffrey Canada
- Language: English
- Subject: Memoir, family conflict, youth violence
- Publisher: January 31, 1995 Beacon Press
- Publication place: United States
- Media type: Print (Paperback and Hardcover)
- Pages: 192
- ISBN: 978-0-8070-0423-4
- Followed by: Reaching Up For Manhood: Transforming the Lives of Boys in America

Fist Stick Knife Gun: A Personal History of Violence is a memoir by American social activist Geoffrey Canada. Beacon Press published the book on January 31, 1995.

Beacon published a graphic novel adaptation of the book in 2010, illustrated by Jamar Nicholas.

== Overview ==
Canada recalls growing up in an inner city neighborhood of [the South Bronx] in the 1950s and 1960s. He details the social expectations and culture that promoted violence among children such as himself and his brothers. He writes about how he and the other boys in the area had parents command them to counter violence and threats (real or perceived) by fighting back. That parental mindset, argues Canada, is certainly well-intentioned but has devastating consequences for children. He also recalls his own familial issues being raised in fatherless poverty.

Canada writes, "many times children as young as six and seven would bring weapons to school, or pick up bottles, bricks, or whatever was at hand." He also says, "The first rules I learned on Union Avenue stayed with me for all of my youth. They were simple and straightforward. Don't cry. Don't act afraid. Don't tell your mother. Take it like a man. Don't let no one take your manhood" (emphasis in original).

Canada asserts that the culture of violence has been compounded in the decades since he grew up. He cites increases in recreational drug use and handgun usage. He specifically refers to the about 50,000 American children killed by guns between 1979 and 1991 to support his argument. Canada concludes that inner-city neighborhoods must enact measures restricting handgun manufacture and possession as well as create safe haven areas for children.

== Graphic novel adaptation ==
A panel from the graphic novel, with the young Geoffrey Canada at left

In the mid-2000s, Beacon Press began considering publishing an alternate graphic novel version. Illustrator Jamar Nicholas and editor Allison Trzop created Fist Stick Knife Gun: A Personal History of Violence (A True Story in Black and White), which was released in stores on September 14, 2010.

== Reception ==
Publishers Weekly praised the book, stating that "A more powerful depiction of the tragic life of urban children and a more compelling plea to end 'America's war against itself' cannot be imagined."

The Los Angeles Times published a mostly positive review by author and arts critic Jabari Asim. Asim wrote that "[i]nterspersing his personal memoir with calls for policy reform gives Canada's book a patina of street-cred' that often compensates for his pedestrian language." He also remarked that "Canada is unlikely to convert naysayers to his cause... preaching to the choir seldom results in anything" while also praising Canada's "eloquence and admirable passion.

The literary magazine San Francisco Book Review praised the graphic novel version, stating:

The problem with gang violence is that it is rarely explored in a personal fashion, and from the perspective of the black male as a victim of his society. Fist Stick Knife Gun is... an excellent personal story and has a nice flowing narrative; it is nice to see an autobiography that also works as an actual story. More to the point, it also works as a warning, as he explores his feelings toward the various escalations and why he feels that is necessary to use the particular weapon at that time, and his final rejection of that lifestyle, as it leads ultimately to death.

== See also ==
- Harlem Children's Zone
- 1995 in literature
- List of autobiographies
