= Regine Sawyer =

- Occupations: Comic writer, manager, and entrepreneur

Regine L. Sawyer is an American comics writer, editor, and founder of Women in Comics NYC Collective International. She is the author of The Rippers, Eating Vampires and Ice Witch. She is the owner, writer, and creator of Lockett Down Productions, a small press company that employs all-female comic book artists with an emphasis on women of color. She moderated the Women in Comics Panel at San Diego Comic-Con in 2017.

Lockett Down Productions Publications was first established in December 2007 by Regine Sawyer. It made its public debut at New York Comic Con in April 2008. Sawyer created this multi-media company to specialize in comic books and promotional apparel. LDP Publications has published several comics: The Rippers, Ice Witch, and Eating Vampires are all written and created by Sawyer.

Women in Comics NYC Collective International or "WinC" is dedicated to giving a voice to women who work in the comic book industry and helping them better brand themselves and promote their projects. Sawyer started this organization in May 2012 after hosting a Women in Comics Panel at Bronx Heroes Comic Con. At the panel, Sawyer recognized a highly underrepresented community of women of color in the comic book industry. WinC stresses being open to all women of any ethnicity, culture, or background with the goal of giving a monetary reason to continue in this field. WinC has grown to have more than 100 members and holds workshops and panels all across the United States.

== Early life ==
Throughout her childhood, Sawyer expressed a passion for comics. She read them with her brother and her father would read the Sunday funnies to her. Her mother was a painter and encouraged her to read everything and anything. Sawyer used her creativity to make her own characters along with stories and her own original illustrations. She once convinced her mother to call the head of Marvel Comics to inquire if he wanted to buy any of her characters.

== College ==
Rather than pursuing a passion for comics, Sawyer attended college with the intention to "buckle down" and find a "real job". She received a bachelor's degree in technology and management which she used right after college when she received a job as a manager.

== After college ==
In 2006, Sawyer was reminded of her passion for comics after meeting Rob Taylor, owner of the independent comic company Superhuman Works. She accepted a job at his company where she would edit his scripts, scout for talent, take submissions from artists, and set up convention appearances for him. It only took a year for her to realize that this was something she could do.

== Career ==
She founded her own company, Lockett Down Productions, and published two comics, The Rippers and Eating Vampires. In 2012, Ray Felix, the executive director for Bronx Heroes Comic Con asked Sawyer to host a panel on women in the industry where she met numerous female comic creators and was inspired to create a space specifically for women in the comics industry. That year she founded Women in Comic Collective.

== Publications ==
Sawyer started writing The Rippers when she was 17-years old. In the series, an intergalactic, government-regulated bounty hunter named Rhiannon O'Cair is accused of a crime that she does not remember committing.

Her newest project is Eating Vampires, about a young girl named Evelyn who is the last of a race of Healers. Her vampire-eating guardian Rigel goes to great lengths in order to protect her from preternatural beings that want her dead.
