= Sam Greenblatt =

Samuel Greenblatt
- Born: Mt. Airy, Philadelphia, Pennsylvania
- Education: BBA and MBA in Information Technology from Temple University in 1972
- Occupations: VP Technology and Architecture

Sam Greenblatt was the chief technology office and architecture (CTO) in the Enterprise Solution Group of the Dell Corporation. Prior he was Chief Technology Officer for webOS and its technical strategy and project at Hewlett-Packard Prior to that he was in charge of Enterprise Business Solutions architecture as the CTO, previously CTO for HP.com and CTO for the LaserJet Enterprise Solutions group and General Manager of Core Technologies IPG within Hewlett-Packard's Imaging and Printing Group. He also ran the Core Technology Group which is responsible all software within both LaserJet and Inkjet Technology. Greenblatt spearheaded HP's move into alliance partnerships with Adobe and Microsoft by transitioning internal developed software to partner software. He has transformed HP's IPG software development process by moving them to Agile software development, metrics-based testing, and joint quality programs with customer support and external partners to increase IPG market share through usability and quality.

== Career ==
Greenblatt also served as Senior Vice President of Strategic Programs for the corporate office of Hewlett-Packard and was responsible for competitive analysis and industry analysis of HP's position in the marketplace. He presented to the board of directors and the executive committee on key analysis of HP's position.

Prior to joining Hewlett Packard, Greenblatt was the senior vice president of Innovation for Computer Associates International, Inc. (CA). He ran CA's intellectual property portfolio, labs and technical leadership council. Previously he was Chief Architect for the Linux Technology Group at CA, where he was responsible for the cross brand integration of Linux technology. He worked with CA's strategic customers and the IT industry to help formulate strategy in emerging Linux technologies. A recognized expert in networked computing, system management and object technology, Mr. Greenblatt worked closely with customers to deliver solutions that focus on emerging technologies. Greenblatt joined CA in 1994 and has held senior management positions in development and cross-platform product strategy. He contributed to the development of CA's Unicenter and eTrust solutions and has served on technical advisory boards for several of CA's largest customers.

Before CA, Greenblatt was Chief Technology Officer and Vice President of Research and Development at Candle Corporation, where he managed key software application projects in communications, distributed processing, applications and development tools, and project management techniques in systems management. Prior to Candle, Greenblatt held management positions at ARCO, Commodore International and Arthur Andersen.

== Boards and Teaching ==
Greenblatt has served on the graduate faculties of Temple University and La Salle University, was on the board of the Object Management Group and sat on the Open Source Development Lab Board (Linux Foundation), Eclipse and the Plone Foundation which he founded. He sat on the board of Ingres. He was a member of the Architecture Board at The Open Group and was the chairman of the DMI Committee on systems management. He is well known for his work on object protocols and their abstraction. He is a recognized expert in Linux and open source. He was on the Advisory board of Linux World Magazine for which he has also been an author. He was the keynote at Linux World 2004 and Linux World Japan in 2003.

== Patents ==
Greenblatt is a co-inventor on three key U.S. patents: USP 5848234 entitled “Object Procedure Messaging Facility” covering object message passing, and USP 5809238 entitled “Data Server with Event Driven Sampling” covering object data stores and USP 6718399 “Communications on a Network”.

== See also ==
- Inkjet technology
