= Geoffrey Canada =

American educator, social activist and author

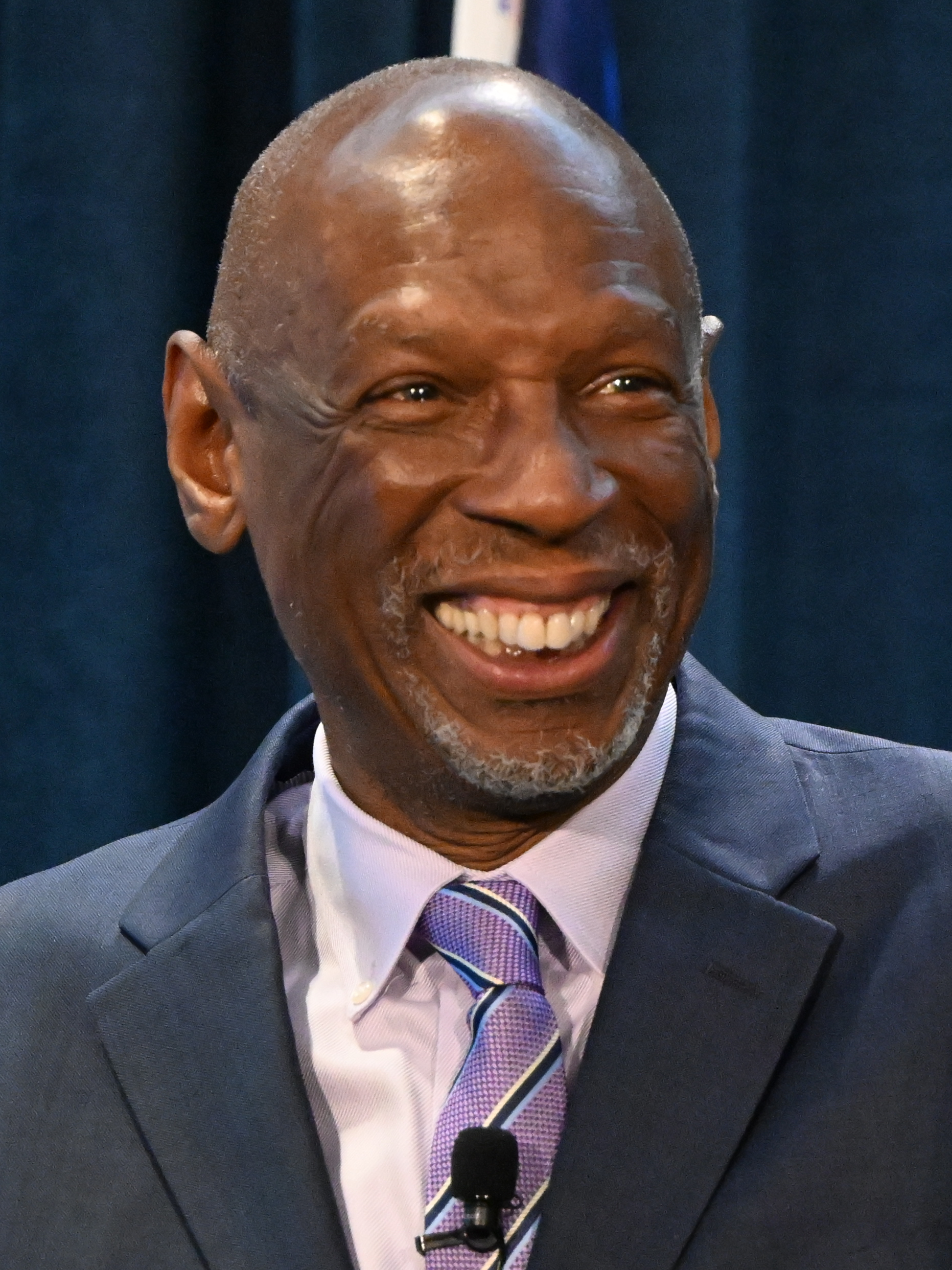
- Canada in 2024
- Born: January 13, 1952 (age 74); Bronx, NY, U.S.
- Education: Bowdoin College (BA); Harvard University (MEd)

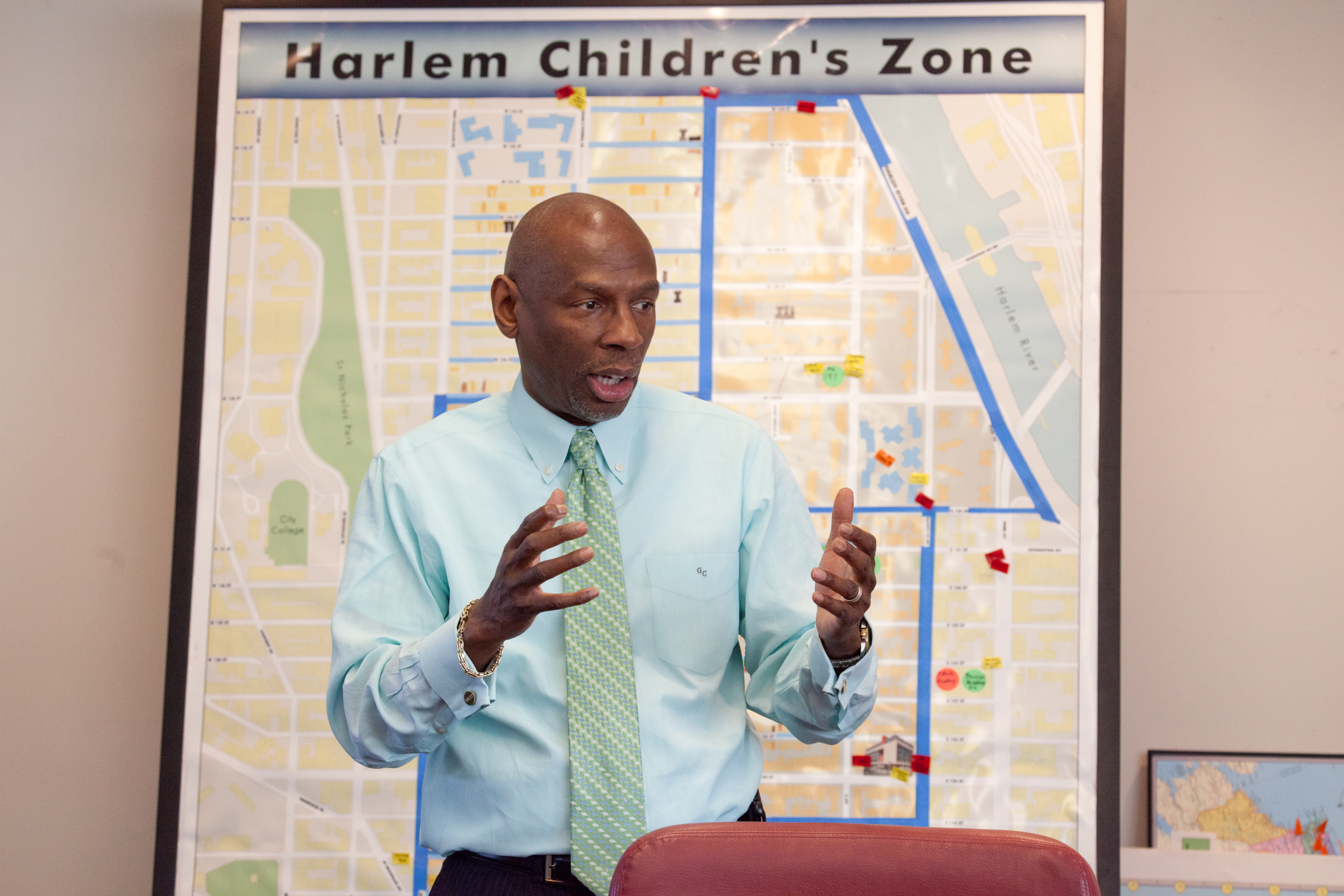

Geoffrey Canada (born January 13, 1952) is an American educator, social activist and author. Since 1990, Canada has been president of the Harlem Children's Zone in Harlem, New York, an organization that states its goal is to increase high school and college graduation rates among students in Harlem. This initiative serves a 97-block area of Harlem replete with at-risk children. Canada serves as the chairman of Children's Defense Fund's board of directors. He was a member of the board of directors of The After-School Corporation, a nonprofit organization that aims to expand educational opportunities for all students. Canada's recommendation for educational reform is to start early using wide-ranging strategies and never give up.

== Early life and education ==
Canada was born in the South Bronx, the third of four sons born to Mary Elizabeth Canada (née Williams), a substance abuse counselor, and McAlister Canada. The marriage of his parents ended in 1956; he was raised by his mother. His father played little part in the life of his children and did not contribute to their financial support. Canada was raised among "abandoned houses, crime, violence and an all-encompassing sense of chaos and disorder".

When Canada was in his mid-teens, his mother sent him to live with her parents in Wyandanch, New York. He attended Wyandanch Memorial High School. During his senior year, he won a scholarship from the Fraternal Order of Masons.

He holds a Bachelor of Arts degree in psychology and sociology from Bowdoin College, from which he graduated in 1974, and a master's degree in education from the Harvard Graduate School of Education.

Canada's brother Derrick Canada was a Harlem Globetrotters player.

== Harlem Children's Zone ==
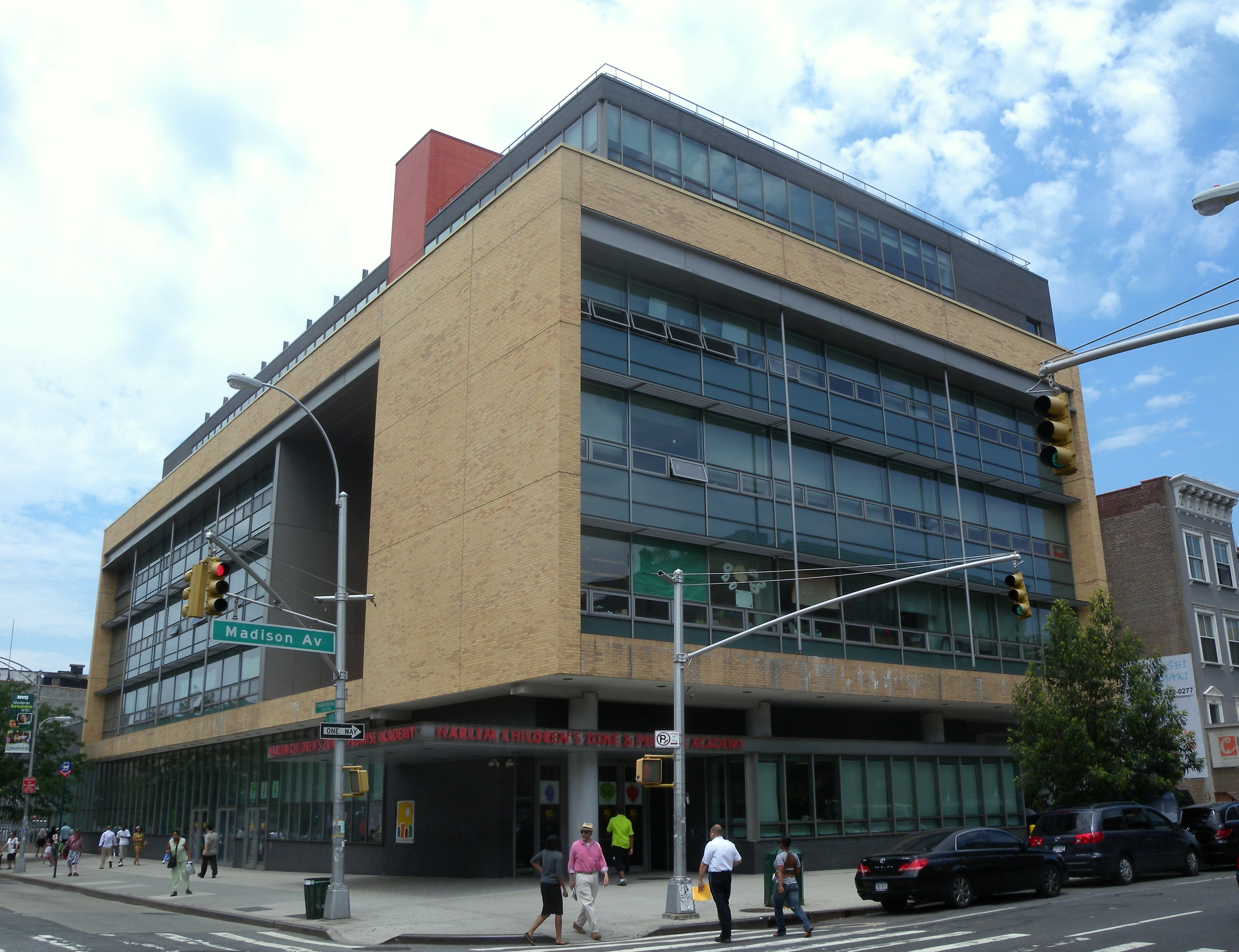
Harlem Children's Zone and Promise Academy

Canada receiving an honorary key to Miami-Dade County in September 1999, presented by County Mayor Alex Penelas (left) and County Commissioners Katy Sorenson and Betty Ferguson

In 1990, Canada began working with the Rheedlen Centers for Children and Families as its president. Unsatisfied with the scope of Rheedlen, Canada transformed the organization into the Harlem Children's Zone (HCZ), a center which followed the academic careers of youths in a 24-block area of Harlem. The area of focus has grown to 97 blocks in the ensuing years. Canada served as president and CEO of the Harlem Children's Zone until July 2014, when the position went to Chief Operating Officer Anne Williams-Isom.

The Harlem Children's Zone was profiled in the New York Times Magazine during 2004 in a story by Paul Tough. The author described the organization as "one of the biggest social experiments of our time". In 2008, Tough published a book entitled, Whatever It Takes: Geoffrey Canada's Quest to Change Harlem and America. Additionally, U.S. News & World Report named Canada one of America's Best Leaders in its October 2005 issue.

Canada has made a number of high-profile television appearances, including a profile interview on 60 Minutes, two televised interviews with Charlie Rose, a guest appearance on The Oprah Winfrey Show, a guest appearance on Late Night with Jimmy Fallon, and three appearances on the Colbert Report. In 2010, Canada appeared in an American Express commercial that premiered during the Academy Awards. The commercial provided an extended look at his work and success at the Harlem Children's Zone.

In 2009, U.S. President Barack Obama announced plans to replicate the HCZ model in 20 other cities across the nation.

Canada is featured prominently in Waiting for Superman (2010), Academy Award-winner Davis Guggenheim's documentary on the state of American public education. The film received the Audience Award for best documentary at the 2010 Sundance Film Festival.

Canada was offered the position of New York City Schools Chancellor by Mayor Michael Bloomberg, but he declined the job.

In 2013, Canada toured college campuses with Stanley Druckenmiller urging reform in taxation, health care, and Social Security to ensure intergenerational equity.

In July 2013, The New Yorker Festival released a video entitled Geoffrey Canada on Giving Voice to the Have-nots, of a panel that was moderated by George Packer. Along with Canada, the panelists included Abhijit Banerjee, Katherine Boo, and Jose Antonio Vargas.

== Books ==
Canada's first book, Fist Stick Knife Gun: A Personal History of Violence in America, was first released in 1995. In the book, Canada recounts his exposure to violence during his childhood and offers a series of recommendations on how to alleviate violence in inner cities. In the mid-2000s (decade), Beacon Press began considering publishing an alternate graphic novel version. Illustrator Jamar Nicholas and editor Allison Trzop created Fist Stick Knife Gun: A Personal History of Violence (A True Story in Black and White), which was released in stores on September 14, 2010.

Publishers Weekly praised Fist, Stick, Knife, Gun, commenting that "[a] more powerful depiction of the tragic life of urban children and a more compelling plea to end 'America's war against itself' cannot be imagined."

In 1998, Canada published his second book, Reaching Up For Manhood: Transforming the Lives of Boys in America.

== Awards and honors ==
- The First Annual Heinz Award in the Human Condition (1995)
- Doctor of Humane Letters, Bowdoin College (2007)
- National Jefferson Award for Greatest Public Service Benefiting the Disadvantaged (2007)
- Doctor of Humane letters, Tulane University (2010)
- Doctor of Laws, Columbia University (2010)
- "Local Hero" honor at 2010 BET Awards
- Doctor of Laws, Princeton University (2011)
- Doctor of Humane Letters, Tufts University (2011)
- Doctor of Humane Letters, University of Pennsylvania (2012)
- Doctor of Humane Letters, Dartmouth College
- Doctor of Humane Letters, Brandeis University (2014)
- Doctor of Humane Letters, Bates College (2017)
- Honorary Degree, Berea College (2022)

== Appointments ==
Geoffrey Canada was chosen by Mayor Michael Bloomberg of New York in 2006 to serve as co-chair of the Commission on Economic Opportunity tasked to formulate a scheme that would considerably trim down poverty. In 2011, he was selected to join the New York State Governor's Council of Economic and Fiscal Advisers. He is also an adviser to and board member of many non-profit entities.
