= Deaths in April 2021 =

The following is a list of notable deaths in April 2021.

Entries for each day are listed alphabetically by surname. A typical entry lists information in the following sequence:

- Name, age, country of citizenship at birth, subsequent country of citizenship (if applicable), reason for notability, cause of death (if known), and reference.

== April 2021 ==
=== 1 ===
- Lee Aaker, 77, American actor (The Adventures of Rin Tin Tin, Hondo, Mister Scoutmaster), stroke.
- Isamu Akasaki, 92, Japanese physicist, Nobel Prize laureate (2014), pneumonia.
- Chandranath Mishra Amar, 96, Indian writer and poet, complications from a fall.
- Klairi Angelidou, 88, Cypriot educator and politician, member of the House of Representatives (1991–1996) and minister of education and culture (1993–1997).
- Hanna Arsenych-Baran, 50, Ukrainian writer, COVID-19.
- Third Bardor Tulku Rinpoche, 71, Tibetan Buddhist teacher.
- Michèle Boegner, 79, French pianist.
- Jorge Chiarella Krüger, 77, Peruvian theatre director and actor.
- Antonio Delgado, 63, Spanish athlete, Paralympic champion (1976), throat cancer.
- Bruce Dinwiddy, 75, British diplomat, Governor of the Cayman Islands (2002–2005).
- Michael Fitchett, 93, Australian footballer (Hawthorn) and cricketer (Victoria).
- Martha Lou Gadsden, 91, American restaurateur.
- Emmanuel Gaillard, 69, French lawyer.
- Giorgio Gatti, 72, Italian baritone, COVID-19.
- Marshall Gelfand, 93, American music entrepreneur.
- Nemam Ghafouri, 52, Iraqi-born Swedish physician, Kurdish activist and humanitarian, COVID-19.
- Gerald Irons, 73, American football player (Oakland Raiders, Cleveland Browns).
- Jack Johnson, 76, American racing driver, complications from amyotrophic lateral sclerosis.
- Rayappu Joseph, 80, Sri Lankan Roman Catholic prelate, bishop of Mannar (1992–2016).
- Patrick Juvet, 70, Swiss model and singer-songwriter.
- Henri Marescaux, 77, French army general and deacon.
- Loránd Milassin, 73, Hungarian Olympic hurdler (1972).
- Wakio Mitsui, 78, Japanese politician, member of the House of Representatives (2000–2012) and minister of health (2012).
- Angelo Perugini, 65, Brazilian politician, mayor of Hortolândia (2005–2012, since 2017) and São Paulo MLA (2015–2016), COVID-19.
- Hugo Portisch, 94, Austrian journalist and writer.
- Hans-Dieter Tippenhauer, 77, German footballer (Fortuna Düsseldorf, Arminia Bielefeld, Borussia Dortmund).
- Divo Zadi, 90, Italian Roman Catholic prelate, bishop of Civita Castellana (1989–2007).

=== 2 ===
- Valentin Afonin, 81, Russian footballer (SKA Rostov-on-Don, CSKA Moscow).
- Shaukat Ali, 76, Pakistani folk singer, liver failure.
- April, 20, American giraffe, euthanized.
- Simon Bainbridge, 68, British composer.
- H. Balasubramaniam, 88, Indian translator, COVID-19.
- Phebe Cramer, 85, American clinical psychologist.
- Marek Czekalski, 67, Polish politician and engineer, mayor of Łódź (1994–1998).
- Pete Giesen, 88, American politician, member of Virginia House of Delegates (1964–1996).
- Ron Herbert, 87, English rugby player (Warrington Wolves).
- Robert Howarth, 93, British politician, MP (1964–1970).
- Arthur Kopit, 83, American playwright (Indians, Wings, Nine).
- Mykhailo Kushnerenko, 82, Ukrainian politician, deputy (1990–1994), complications from COVID-19.
- Clara LaMore, 94, American Olympic swimmer (1948).
- Gabi Luncă, 82, Romanian folk and lăutărească singer, complications from COVID-19.
- Mohammed Oreibi Al-Khalifa, 51, Iraqi judge (Trial of Saddam Hussein), COVID-19.
- Benito Orgiana, 83, Italian politician, deputy (1992–1994).
- Chepina Peralta, 90, Mexican chef and TV personality.
- Nelu Ploieșteanu, 70, Romanian fiddler and lăutărească singer, complications from COVID-19.
- Jean Luc Rosat, 67, Brazilian Olympic volleyball player (1976, 1980), complications from COVID-19.
- Norman C. Stone, 81, American psychotherapist and philanthropist.
- Quindon Tarver, 38, American R&B singer, traffic collision.
- Christian Tumi, 90, Cameroonian Roman Catholic cardinal, bishop of Yagoua (1979–1982), archbishop of Garoua (1984–1991) and Douala (1991–2009).
- Bernard Vallée, 76, French Olympic fencer (1968, 1972).
- Gordon Weaver, 84, American novelist and short story writer.
- Marvin Weintraub, 96, Polish-born Canadian plant pathologist.
- Zafar Ali Zafari, 90, Pakistani field hockey player, Olympic champion (1960).

=== 3 ===
- José Adauto Bezerra, 94, Brazilian politician, governor of Ceará (1975–1978), Ceará MLA (1959–1979) and deputy (1979–1983), COVID-19.
- C. Sidney Burrus, 86, American electrical engineer.
- Remus Câmpeanu, 82, Romanian footballer (Universitatea Cluj).
- Innocent Chukwuma, 55, Nigerian businessman and investor.
- Kathie Coblentz, 73, American librarian and author.
- Jill Corey, 85, American singer ("Love Me to Pieces", "Let It Be Me").
- Pier Giacomo De Nicolò, 92, Italian Roman Catholic prelate, apostolic nuncio to Costa Rica (1984–1993).
- Lois de Banzie, 90, Scottish-born American actress (Morning's at Seven, Annie, Sister Act).
- Guram Dochanashvili, 82, Georgian writer (The First Garment).
- John Edgar, 70, New Zealand sculptor and medallist.
- Mark Elliott, 81, American voice-over artist, heart attack.
- Elidio Espinoza, 65, Peruvian politician, mayor of Trujillo (2015–2018), COVID-19.
- Hubert Gerbeau, 84, French writer and historian.
- Lee Meitzen Grue, 87, American poet.
- Jim Haynie, 81, American actor (Pretty in Pink, The Bridges of Madison County, Silverado), pneumonia.
- Gloria Henry, 98, American actress (Dennis the Menace, Miss Grant Takes Richmond, Rancho Notorious).
- Ho Lien Siew, 88, Singaporean Olympic basketball player (1956), pulmonary infection.
- Carl Hodges, 84, American atmospheric and climate scientist, complications from Alzheimer's disease.
- James B. Holderman, 85, American academic, president of the University of South Carolina (1977–1990).
- Martin Hyman, 87, British Olympic long-distance runner (1960).
- Mehli Irani, 90, Indian cricketer (Mumbai).
- Ahmad Kamil Jaafar, 83, Malaysian politician and diplomat, ambassador to Switzerland, China, Japan, and Thailand (1989–1996).
- Herb Johnson, 92, American football player (New York Giants).
- N. M. Kamble, 95, Indian politician, mayor of Mumbai (1957–1962) and MP (1974–1982, 1984–1988).
- Robert D. Kennedy, 88, American businessman.
- Willy Kurant, 87, Belgian cinematographer (Les Créatures, Masculin Féminin, The Immortal Story).
- Luo Ying-shay, 69, Taiwanese politician, minister of justice (2013–2016) and governor of Fujian Province (2013), breast cancer.
- Cyprian Kizito Lwanga, 68, Ugandan Roman Catholic prelate, archbishop of Kampala (since 2006).
- Sam Obi, 59, Nigerian politician, acting governor of Delta State (2010–2011).
- Yinka Odumakin, 54, Nigerian human rights activist and politician, complications from COVID-19.
- John Paragon, 66, American actor (Pee-wee's Playhouse, UHF, Elvira: Mistress of the Dark), cardiovascular disease.
- Wali Rahmani, 77, Indian Islamic scholar and politician, founder of Rahmani30 and Bihar MLC (1974–1996).
- Brother Stair, 87, American Pentecostal evangelical pastor and radio preacher (The Overcomer Ministry).
- Stan Stephens, 91, Canadian-born American politician, member (1969–1985) and president (1983–1985) of the Montana Senate, governor of Montana (1989–1993).
- Masakazu Tamura, 77, Japanese actor (Higashi Shinakai, Onna-rō Hizu, Last Love), heart failure.
- Agnaldo Timóteo, 84, Brazilian singer and politician, deputy (1986–1996), COVID-19.
- Philippe Venault, 73, French director and screenwriter.
- Yevgeniy Zagorulko, 78, Russian high jump coach, complications from COVID-19.
- Carla Zampatti, 78, Italian-Australian fashion designer, complications from a fall.

=== 4 ===
- António Almeida Henriques, 59, Portuguese politician, mayor of Viseu (since 2013) and deputy (2002–2011), COVID-19.
- Jens-Peter Bonde, 73, Danish politician, MEP (1979–2009).
- Thomas D. Brock, 94, American microbiologist, complications from a fall.
- Roberto Calero, 77, Ecuadorian bolero singer, kidney disease.
- Khalil Dhantejvi, 85, Indian poet.
- Jean Dupuy, 95, French-born American artist.
- Paolo Filippi, 58, Italian politician, president of the Province of Alessandria (2004–2014), heart attack.
- Dame Cheryl Gillan, 68, British politician, MP (since 1992), secretary of state for Wales (2010–2012).
- Francisco Haghenbeck, 56, Mexican writer and comics screenwriter, COVID-19.
- Aslamul Haque, 59, Bangladeshi politician, MP (since 2018), cardiac arrest.
- Sugako Hashida, 95, Japanese screenwriter (Oshin), lymphoma.
- Paul Humphrey, 61, Canadian musician (Blue Peter), multiple system atrophy.
- Digvijaysinh Jhala, 88, Indian politician, MP (1980–1989) and Gujarat MLA (1962–1972).
- Adolf Kabo, 61, Indonesian footballer (Perseman Manokwari, national team).
- Kim In, 77, South Korean Go player, Guksu champion (1965–1970), stomach cancer.
- Victoria Kovalchuk, 67, Ukrainian illustrator, designer and writer, complications from COVID-19.
- Henri Lemay, 81, Canadian politician, Quebec MNA (1981–1985).
- Ingela Lind, 78, Swedish art critic and writer.
- Robert D. Linder, 87, American historian.
- Eddy van der Maarel, 87, Dutch ecologist.
- Zygmunt Malanowicz, 83, Polish actor (Knife in the Water, Hunting Flies, Cserepek).
- Paddy McMahon, 87, British showjumper.
- Frank Mdlalose, 89, South African politician, premier of KwaZulu-Natal (1994–1997), COVID-19.
- Robert Mundell, 89, Canadian economist, Nobel Prize laureate (1999), cholangiocarcinoma.
- Mako Nakagawa, 84, American educator.
- Chandra Nayudu, 88, Indian cricket player and commentator.
- Alfonso Quijano, 78, Ecuadorian footballer (Barcelona S.C., national team).
- Keosaychay Sayasone, 62, Laotian socialite, first lady (2006–2016), drowned.
- Ralph Schuckett, 73, American keyboardist (Utopia).
- Shashikala, 88, Indian actress (Sujata, Aarti, Anupama).
- Bhagwati Singh, 88, Indian politician, MP (2004–2009) and Uttar Pradesh MLA (1977–2003), heart attack.
- Roland Thöni, 70, Italian alpine ski racer, Olympic bronze medalist (1972).

=== 5 ===
- Robert de Almendra Freitas, 73, Brazilian doctor and politician, mayor of José de Freitas (2005–2010) and Piauí MLA (1987–2003), COVID-19.
- P. Balachandran, 69, Indian actor (Gandhi, Hotel California, Operation Java) and screenwriter.
- Isabel Joy Bear, 94, Australian chemist.
- Philip K. Chapman, 86, Australian-born American astronaut (NASA Astronaut Group 6).
- Sir Paul Cosford, 57, British health official, medical director at Public Health England, lung cancer.
- Jon Michael Dunn, 79, American philosopher.
- Veronica Dunne, 93, Irish soprano.
- Robert Fletcher, 98, American costume designer (Star Trek, Fright Night, The Last Starfighter).
- Uri Gallin, 92, Israeli Olympic discus thrower (1952).
- Ulrike Gauss, 79, German art historian and professor.
- Vladimir Gendlin, 84, Russian television journalist and sports commentator (NTV, NTV Plus, Channel One), complications from COVID-19.
- Tom Gibney, 84, Canadian television journalist (CFTO).
- Terry Gunn, 85, English cricketer (Sussex).
- Haja El Hamdaouia, 91, Moroccan singer-songwriter.
- Socratis Hasikos, 64, Cypriot politician, minister of defence (1999–2003, 2014) and interior (2013–2017).
- Sarah Hughes, 48, British journalist, cancer.
- Joye Hummel, 97, American comic book writer (Wonder Woman).
- Jan-Olav Ingvaldsen, 67, Norwegian politician, MP (1985–1989).
- Frank Jacobs, 91, American comics writer (Mad).
- Krzysztof Krawczyk, 74, Polish baritone pop singer, guitarist and composer.
- Paulino Lukudu Loro, 80, South Sudanese Roman Catholic prelate, bishop of El Obeid (1979–1983) and archbishop of Juba (1983–2019).
- Izz al-Din Manasirah, 74, Palestinian poet, critic and academic, complications from COVID-19.
- Jaroslav Mareš, 83, Czech biologist, traveller and author.
- Bill Markham, 98, American politician, member of the Oregon House of Representatives (1969–1993).
- Antoine Martin, 66, French writer.
- Gene Mullin, 83, American politician, member of the California State Assembly (2002–2008), mayor of South San Francisco (1997–1998, 2001–2002).
- Lefteris Mytilineos, 74, Greek singer, COVID-19.
- Cécile Renault, French astrophysicist, traffic collision.
- Paul Ritter, 54, English actor (Friday Night Dinner, Chernobyl, No Offence), heart failure.
- Marshall Sahlins, 90, American anthropologist (Sahlins–Obeyesekere debate).
- Sir Jack Shaw, 88, Scottish accountant and businessman, Governor of the Bank of Scotland (1999–2001).
- Malcolm Kela Smith, 77, British-Australian politician, governor of Eastern Highlands Province (2002–2012), complications from COVID-19.
- Susan L. Smith, 73–74, American art historian, complications from cancer.
- Henry Stephen, 79, Venezuelan singer, complications from COVID-19.
- György Vókó, 74, Hungarian criminalist and professor of law.
- Qabdesh Zhumadilov, 84, Kazakh author.

=== 6 ===
- Peter Ainsworth, 64, British politician, MP (1992–2010), heart attack.
- Réginald Bernut, 84, French politician, vice-president of the Congress of New Caledonia (2004–2007), mayor of Le Mont-Dore (2001–2003).
- Alan Braden, 94, English composer.
- Kittie Bruneau, 91, Canadian painter and printmaker.
- Alice Headley Chandler, 95, American Hall of Fame horsebreeder (Sir Ivor) and racing stable owner, Eclipse Award of Merit (2009).
- Midwin Charles, 47, American lawyer and legal analyst (CNN, MSNBC).
- Dick Colpaert, 78, American baseball player (Pittsburgh Pirates).
- Charles H. Coolidge, 99, American technical sergeant, Medal of Honor recipient.
- Chuck Darling, 91, American basketball player (Iowa Hawkeyes), Olympic champion (1956).
- Rodolfo da Ponte, 82, Paraguayan Olympic fencer (1968).
- François de Cossé-Brissac, 92, French aristocrat, 13th Duke of Brissac (since 1993).
- Dante Della Terza, 96, Italian literary scholar.
- Prathima Devi, 88, Indian actress (Krishnaleela, Jaganmohini, Paalige Bandadde Panchamrutha).
- Denis Donoghue, 92, Irish literary critic.
- Reese Erlich, 73, American author, cancer.
- Firmino Filho, 57, Brazilian economist and academic, mayor of Teresina (1997–2004, 2013–2020) and Piauí MLA (2011–2012).
- Hans Kristian Gaarder, 60, Norwegian conspiracy theorist, COVID-19.
- Paul Greenberg, 84, American journalist (Arkansas Democrat-Gazette), Pulitzer Prize winner (1969).
- Pierre Guichard, 81, French historian and academic.
- K. A. Siddique Hassan, 75, Indian scholar.
- Alcee Hastings, 84, American politician and jurist, member of the U.S. House of Representatives (since 1993), judge of the U.S. District Court for Southern Florida (1979–1989), pancreatic cancer.
- Tim F. Hayes, 74, Irish Gaelic footballer (Clonakilty).
- Mattie Hetherton, 69, Irish Gaelic footballer (Cavan).
- Grischa Huber, 76, German actress (Under the Pavement Lies the Strand, The Serpent's Egg, The Garden).
- Michel Koeniguer, 49, French comic book artist, heart attack.
- Joe Krebs, 78, American television news anchor, cancer.
- Hans Küng, 93, Swiss Roman Catholic priest, theologian and author (On Being a Christian, Islam: Past, Present and Future).
- Julen Madariaga, 88, Spanish Basque nationalist militant and lawyer, co-founder of ETA.
- Alfred Leonhard Maluma, 65, Tanzanian Roman Catholic prelate, bishop of Njombe (since 2002).
- Packy McGarty, 87, Irish Gaelic football player (Leitrim).
- Al Mengert, 91, American golfer.
- Lily Oddie, 83, Canadian politician, Ontario MPP (1985–1990).
- Arcadi Oliveres, 75, Spanish economist, academic and social activist, pancreatic cancer.
- Walter Olkewicz, 72, American actor (Grace Under Fire, Twin Peaks, The Client).
- Umbu Landu Paranggi, 77, Indonesian artist and poet, COVID-19.
- Jan Purwinski, 86, Latvian-born Ukrainian Roman Catholic prelate, bishop of Kyiv-Zhytomyr (1991–2011), COVID-19.
- Paul Rabinow, 76, American anthropologist.
- Bobby Schilling, 57, American politician, member of the U.S. House of Representatives (2011–2013), cancer.
- Louis Siminovitch, 100, Canadian molecular biologist.
- Sonny Simmons, 87, American jazz saxophonist.
- Maj Britt Theorin, 88, Swedish politician, MP (1971–1995) and MEP (1995–2004).
- Marie Toole, 94, Canadian curler.
- Nestor Torre Jr., 78, Filipino screenwriter, director and journalist, complications from COVID-19.
- Predrag Živković Tozovac, 85, Serbian folk musician and actor, COVID-19.
- Uci Turtusi, Indonesian Muslim cleric and preacher.
- Jack Veneno, 78, Dominican professional wrestler (WWC) and politician, pancreatic cancer.
- Anna Wasilewska, 63, Polish politician, deputy (since 2015).
- Gene Youngblood, 78, American media theorist and writer (Expanded Cinema), complications from a heart attack.
- Fatima Zakaria, 85, Indian journalist (The Times of India) and educationist, complications from COVID-19.

=== 7 ===
- Farid Alakbarli, 57, Azerbaijani historian.
- Ina Marija Bartaitė, 25, Lithuanian actress (Peace to Us in Our Dreams, Seneca's Day), traffic collision.
- Anne Beatts, 74, American humorist and television writer (National Lampoon, Saturday Night Live, Square Pegs).
- Mitiku Belachew, 78, Ethiopian-born Belgian surgeon.
- Rafael Benjumea Cabeza de Vaca, 82, Spanish aristocrat and engineer, cardiac arrest.
- Alfredo Bosi, 84, Brazilian literary critic, member of the Brazilian Academy of Letters, COVID-19.
- Manfred Buder, 85, German ice hockey player (SG Dynamo Weißwasser).
- Antonio Calpe, 81, Spanish football player (Levante, Real Madrid) and manager.
- Jorge Coelho, 66, Portuguese politician, deputy (1989–2006), heart attack.
- Jerry Davie, 88, American baseball player (Detroit Tigers).
- Emmanuel Evans-Anfom, 101, Ghanaian physician and academic administrator, commissioner for health and education (1979), vice chancellor of KNUST (1967–1973).
- Lucyna Mirosława Falkowska, 70, Polish oceanographer.
- Victor Garber, 101, American politician, member of the Wyoming House of Representatives (1959–1965, 1979–1981).
- James Hampton, 84, American actor (F Troop, The Longest Yard, Teen Wolf) and director, complications from Parkinson's disease.
- Susumu Kagawa, 76, Japanese urologist.
- Simon Keay, 66, British archaeologist and academic.
- Viktor Kurentsov, 80, Russian weightlifter, Olympic champion (1968).
- Janice Lauer, 88, American scholar.
- Peter Manso, 80, American author, heart attack.
- Paul Marland, 81, British politician, MP (1979–1997).
- Kai Nielsen, 94, American philosopher.
- Namkabuan Nongkeepahuyuth, 48, Thai Muay Thai fighter, lung cancer.
- Bill Owens, 85, American songwriter.
- Karel Pacner, 85, Czech author.
- Wayne Peterson, 93, American composer.
- Paul Popovici, 72, Romanian football player (Bihor Oradea, UTA Arad, national team) and manager, heart attack.
- Colette Privat, 95, French politician, deputy (1967–1968, 1978–1981).
- Indra Mohan Rajbongshi, 75, Bangladeshi folk singer, COVID-19.
- Tommy Raudonikis, 70, Australian rugby league player (Western Suburbs, Newtown, national team), cancer.
- Jack Smith, 85, American baseball player (Los Angeles Dodgers, Milwaukee Braves), Alzheimer's disease.
- Théophile Sowié, Burkinabe actor (Les Visiteurs, Lumumba).
- Heinz Stübig, 81, German educator.
- Richard Sutton, 83, English businessman, stabbed.
- György Szomjas, 80, Hungarian film director (Tight Quarters) and screenwriter.
- Éliane Thibaut-Comelade, 92, French journalist, writer and cook.
- Takis Vougiouklakis, 82, Greek director and producer.
- Howard Weitzman, 81, American entertainment and criminal lawyer, cancer.

=== 8 ===
- Phillip Adams, 32, American football player (Seattle Seahawks, Oakland Raiders, New York Jets) and mass murderer (2021 Rock Hill shooting), suicide by gunshot.
- Iñaki Aldekoa, 81, Spanish politician, deputy (1986–1987) and member of the Parliament of Navarre (1979–1983), lymphoma.
- Michel Berson, 75, French politician, deputy (1981–1997) and senator (2011–2017), mayor of Crosne (1977–1998).
- Margaret Wander Bonanno, 71, American science fiction writer (Dwellers in the Crucible, Strangers from the Sky).
- John da Silva, 86, New Zealand boxer and Olympic wrestler (1956).
- Jovan Divjak, 84, Bosnian army general (Bosnian War, Siege of Sarajevo).
- Hester van Eeghen, 62, Dutch fashion accessory designer.
- Conn Findlay, 90, American sailor and rower, Olympic champion (1956, 1964).
- Angelo Gelsomini, 89, Italian Olympic wrestler (1960).
- Ian Gregory, 78–79, British ceramic sculptor.
- Miklós Hajdufy, 88, Hungarian screenwriter and director.
- Cliff Hill, 78, English rugby league player (Wigan, Oldham, national team).
- Doug Holden, 90, English footballer (Bolton Wanderers, Preston North End, national team).
- Ton van den Hurk, 88, Dutch footballer (FC Eindhoven, VVV-Venlo, Sittardia).
- Diána Igaly, 56, Hungarian sport shooter, Olympic champion (2004), COVID-19.
- Jetta Jones, 95, American lawyer and philanthropist, complications from dementia.
- Antal Kiss, 85, Hungarian racewalker, Olympic silver medalist (1968).
- Roseli Machado, 52, Brazilian Olympic long-distance runner (1996), COVID-19.
- Red Mack, 83, American football player (Pittsburgh Steelers, Green Bay Packers).
- Mahyuddin N. S., 73, Indonesian politician and academic, governor of South Sumatra (2008), member of the People's Representative Council (2009–2014), COVID-19.
- John Naisbitt, 92, American futurologist and author.
- Ñito, 81, Spanish footballer (Tenerife, Valencia, Granada).
- César Ramón Ortega Herrera, 82, Venezuelan Roman Catholic prelate, bishop of Margarita (1983–1998) and Barcelona (1998–2014).
- Michele Pasinato, 52, Italian volleyball player, world champion (1998).
- Alan Pastrana, 76, American football player (Denver Broncos), complications from COVID-19.
- Riyaz Punjabi, 74, Indian academic administrator, vice chancellor of the University of Kashmir (2008–2011), cancer.
- Richard Rush, 91, American film director (The Stunt Man, Color of Night, Freebie and the Bean).
- Peter Terson, 89, British playwright.
- Horst Trimhold, 80, German footballer (Borussia Dortmund, FSV Frankfurt, national team).

=== 9 ===
- Raosaheb Antapurkar, 63, Indian politician, Maharashtra MLA (since 2019), complications from COVID-19.
- Maryan Bakalarczyk, 93, Polish-Belgian footballer (R.F.C. Tilleur, R. Charleroi S.C., Standard Liège).
- Daniel Benítez, 33, Venezuelan footballer (Deportivo Táchira, Deportivo La Guaira), cancer.
- Paddy Cahill, 44, Irish filmmaker and cycling advocate.
- Shyama Charan Gupta, 76, Indian politician, MP (2004–2009, since 2014), COVID-19.
- Ramsey Clark, 93, American lawyer (Saddam Hussein, Slobodan Milošević), attorney general (1966–1969) and deputy attorney general (1965–1967).
- Gavriel Cohen, 92, Israeli historian and politician, member of the Knesset (1965–1969).
- Arthur Cox, 87, British actor (Doctor Who, Yes Minister).
- DMX, 50, American rapper ("Party Up (Up in Here)", "X Gon' Give It to Ya") and actor (Cradle 2 the Grave), cocaine-induced heart attack.
- Ralph Erskine, 87, British cryptologist and historian.
- Ekkehard Fasser, 68, Swiss bobsledder, Olympic champion (1988).
- Sandra J. Feuerstein, 75, American jurist, judge of the U.S. District Court for Eastern New York (since 2003), traffic collision.
- Rudolf Furmanov, 82, Russian actor (The Circus Burned Down, and the Clowns Have Gone, I Want to Go to Prison) and stage director, People's Artist of Russia (2008).
- Red Gendron, 63, American ice hockey coach (Maine Black Bears, Albany River Rats, Indiana Ice).
- Ian Gibson, 82, British politician, MP (1997–2009).
- Michel Girouard, 76, Canadian journalist.
- Nikki Grahame, 38, English television personality (Big Brother, Princess Nikki, Big Brother Canada), anorexia nervosa.
- Abdul Hamid Sebba, 86, Brazilian lawyer and politician, Goiás MLA (1995–2003), COVID-19.
- Bob Hardy, 84, British Anglican prelate, Bishop of Lincoln (1987–2002).
- Md Abul Hashem, 98, Bangladeshi politician, Pakistan MNA (1970–1971).
- Shay Healy, 78, Irish songwriter ("What's Another Year") and television broadcaster (Nighthawks).
- Bob Herman, 92, American urban sociologist, complications from a fall.
- Charles Jenkins, 69, American Episcopal prelate, bishop of Louisiana (1998–2009), pancreatic cancer.
- Mahesh Joshi, 82, Indian politician, Madhya Pradesh MLA (1967–1972, 1980–1990).
- Roman Kanafotskyi, 83, Ukrainian footballer (Dnipro, Kryvbas Kryvyi Rih, Elektrometalurh-NZF Nikopol).
- Wolfgang Kaniber, 81, German footballer (Fortuna Düsseldorf, VfL Osnabrück, RC Strasbourg).
- Giorgos Karaivaz, 52, Greek journalist, shot.
- André Le Ruyet, 88, French writer and poet.
- Eduardo Malaquina, 84, Uruguayan politician, intendant of Salto (1985–1990, 1995–2005) and senator (2011–2015).
- Gervais Mendo Ze, 76, Cameroonian linguist and academic.
- Jack Minker, 93, American scientist.
- June Newton, 97, Australian photographer and model.
- John W. Nyquist, 88, American vice admiral, cancer.
- Martin Aristide Okouda, 69, Cameroonian politician, minister of economy, planning and regional development (2000–2004).
- Willis S. Olson, 91, American Olympic ski jumper (1952, 1956).
- Dahuku Péré, 68, Togolese politician, president of the National Assembly (1994–1999).
- Prince Philip, Duke of Edinburgh, 99, Greek-born British royal consort of Queen Elizabeth II (since 1952).
- Kirsten Aschengreen Piacenti, 92, Danish art historian, civil servant and essayist.
- Stefan Polónyi, 90, Hungarian-born German civil engineer.
- Konstantin Provalov, 71, Russian diplomat, ambassador to Estonia (2000–2006).
- Rubens Recalcatti, 72, Brazilian politician and lawyer, Paraná MLA (since 2017), heart attack.
- Judith Reisman, 85, American author and anti-pornography activist.
- Helímenas de Jesús Rojo Paredes, 94, Venezuelan Roman Catholic prelate, bishop (1980–1995) and archbishop (1995–2001) of Calabozo.
- Julien Van Roosbroeck, 85, Belgian footballer (national team).
- Yasumasa Shigeno, 79, Japanese politician, member of the House of Representatives (2000–2003, 2005–2012), heart attack.
- Trinity, 67, Jamaican reggae toaster and producer.
- Ross Young, 59, Canadian politician, Prince Edward Island MLA (1991–1996).

=== 10 ===
- Edwin E. Aguilar, 46, Salvadoran-born American animator (The Simpsons, Transformers, G.I. Joe), stroke.
- Sabiamad Abdul Ahad, 65, Malaysian Olympic sports shooter (1984).
- John Angelicoussis, 72, Greek shipping magnate, heart attack.
- Mehtap Ar, 64, Turkish actress.
- István Bérczi, 75, Hungarian Olympic gymnast (1972), complications from COVID-19.
- LaDonna Brave Bull Allard, 64, American Lakota historian and Native American rights activist (Dakota Access Pipeline protests), brain cancer.
- Edward Cassidy, 96, Australian Roman Catholic cardinal, apostolic pro-nuncio to China (1970–1979) and Bangladesh (1973–1979), president of the PCPCU (1989–2001).
- Tulio Manuel Chirivella Varela, 88, Venezuelan Roman Catholic prelate, bishop of Margarita (1974–1982) and archbishop of Barquisimeto (1982–2007), COVID-19.
- Quinton Claunch, 99, American musician, record producer and record label owner.
- Chandler Davidson, 84, American academic administrator and voting rights activist, brain inflammation.
- Félix del Blanco Prieto, 83, Spanish Roman Catholic prelate, papal almoner (2007–2012), apostolic nuncio to Equatorial Guinea (1996–2003) and archbishop of Vannida (since 1991).
- Rossana Di Bello, 64, Italian politician, mayor of Taranto (2000–2006), COVID-19.
- Lee Dunne, 86, Irish author.
- Fred Erdman, 87, Belgian lawyer and politician, senator (1991–1999) and MP (1999–2003).
- Börje Holmberg, 97, Swedish educator and writer.
- Bruno Iwuoha, 68, Nigerian actor, complications from diabetes.
- Roger Kasperson, 83, American geographer.
- Kas Kastner, 92, American motorsports manager and car builder.
- Satish Kaul, 74, Indian actor (Warrant, Shiva Ka Insaaf, Ilzaam), COVID-19.
- Nikolai Martynyuk, 86, Russian vice admiral.
- Édouard Maunick, 89, Mauritian poet.
- Guillaume Oyônô Mbia, 82, Cameroonian writer.
- Garba Mohammed, 76, Nigerian politician, governor of Sokoto State (1985–1987).
- Victor Mukete, 102, Cameroonian politician and traditional chief, senator (since 1959).
- Mike Olton, 82, Trinidadian-English cricketer (Kent, Trinidad and Tobago national team).
- Varghese Paul, 77, Indian writer, journalist, and priest.
- Max Pons, 94, French poet and editor.
- Bob Porter, 80, American Hall of Fame record producer, discographer and broadcaster, complications from esophageal cancer.
- Michel Quévit, 81, Belgian writer and Walloon activist.
- M. Richard Rose, 88, American academic, president of Alfred University (1974–1978) and the Rochester Institute of Technology (1979–1992).
- Hassan Shahriar, 74, Bangladeshi journalist (The Daily Ittefaq, Newsweek, The Indian Express).
- Imre Simkó, 82, Hungarian Olympic sport shooter (1960, 1964).
- Bosse Skoglund, 85, Swedish drummer (Peps Persson).
- Lynn Stevenson, 97, American physicist.
- Sindisiwe van Zyl, 45, South African physician and HIV activist, complications from COVID-19.
- Marcio Veloz Maggiolo, 84, Dominican writer, archaeologist and anthropologist, complications from COVID-19.
- Lin Whitworth, 87, American politician, member of the Idaho Senate (1994–2000), dementia.
- Ivan Zhukov, 86, Russian military pilot, Hero of the Soviet Union (1982).
- Noel Brown, 95, American tennis player.

=== 11 ===
- Colin Baker, 86, Welsh footballer (Cardiff City, national team).
- Guillermo Berrío, 53, Colombian football player and coach (Atlético Huila), heart attack.
- Marco Bollesan, 79, Italian rugby union player and manager (national team).
- Nelson Bornier, 71, Brazilian politician and lawyer, deputy (1991–1996, 2003–2012) and mayor of Nova Iguaçu (1997–2002, 2013–2016), COVID-19.
- Noel Brown, 95, American tennis player.
- Todd J. Campbell, 64, American jurist, judge (since 1995) and chief judge (2005–2012) of the U.S. District Court for Middle Tennessee, multiple system atrophy.
- Normand Cherry, 82, Canadian politician, Quebec MNA (1989–1998).
- Tony Curtsinger, 82, American politician.
- Massimo Cuttitta, 54, Italian rugby union player (national team) and manager, COVID-19.
- Giannetto De Rossi, 78, Italian make-up artist (Emanuelle in America, Zombi 2, Dune).
- Leokadiya Drobizheva, 88, Russian sociologist.
- Philippe Dubourg, 82, French politician and surgeon, deputy (1993–1997, 2002–2007), mayor of Illats (since 1977).
- Micky Erbe, 74, Canadian film and television composer (Earth: Final Conflict, Ticket to Heaven, Adderly), cancer.
- Dick Fenton-Smith, 89, Australian footballer (Melbourne).
- Pedro Ivo Ferreira Caminhas, 68, Brazilian politician, Minas Gerais MLA (2001–2011), COVID-19.
- Jacques Giès, 71, French sinologist and art historian, president of the Guimet Museum (2008–2011).
- Mita Haque, 58, Bangladeshi singer, complications from COVID-19.
- Donald Henson, 64, British archaeologist and prehistorian.
- Milou Hermus, 73, Dutch painter.
- Füzuli Javadov, 70, Azerbaijani footballer (SKA Rostov-on-Don, Neftçi PFK, Daugava Riga), COVID-19.
- Justo Jorge Padrón, 77, Spanish poet, essayist and translator, COVID-19.
- Miguel López Abril, 66, Spanish basketball player.
- Stanislav Lugailo, 83, Ukrainian volleyball player, Olympic champion (1964).
- Fillipus Nandenga, 78, Namibian military officer.
- Artturi Niemelä, 97, Finnish homesteader and politician, MP (1970–1975).
- Colombe Pelletier, 97, Canadian pianist, coach and accompanist.
- Phumlani Pikoli, 33, Zimbabwean-born South African author and journalist. (body discovered on this date)
- Alix Renaud, 75, Haitian-born Canadian writer.
- Daisuke Ryu, 64, Japanese actor (Kagemusha, Ran, Gojoe), intracranial hemorrhage.
- Lotte Sandberg, 64, Norwegian art historian and journalist.
- Enzo Sciotti, 76, Italian artist and illustrator (The Beyond, Demons, The Blood of Heroes).
- Syed Yahya Shah, 93, Pakistani politician, Gilgit-Baltistan MLA (1975–1980).
- Zoran Simjanović, 74, Serbian composer and musician (Siluete, Elipse), COVID-19.
- Joseph Siravo, 66, American actor (The Sopranos, American Crime Story, Oslo), colon cancer.
- Ady Steg, 96, Slovak-born French urologist and Holocaust survivor.
- Gerren Taylor, 30, American television personality (Baldwin Hills, America the Beautiful).
- K. Thippeswamy, 80, Indian politician, Andhra Pradesh MLA (1978–1983).
- Mauro Viale, 73, Argentine journalist and television presenter, COVID-19.
- Shirley Williams, 90, British politician and life peer, MP (1964–1979, 1981–1983), education secretary (1976–1979), and co-founder of the SDP.
- John Williamson, 83, British-born American economist.

=== 12 ===
- Nadiya Babych, 77, Ukrainian linguist.
- Oldemiro Balói, 66, Mozambican politician, minister of foreign affairs (2008–2017).
- Kunja Bojji, 95, Indian politician, Andhra Pradesh MLA (1985–1999).
- Thomas E. Delahanty II, 75, American lawyer and jurist, U.S. Attorney for the District of Maine (1980–1981, 2010–2017), pancreatic cancer.
- Roland Delmaire, 79, French historian and academic.
- Peter Goy, 82, English footballer (Arsenal, Southend United, Watford).
- Ho Yen Chye, 54, Singaporean Olympic judoka (1992), heart failure.
- Angèle Jacq, 83, French writer.
- Dhanare Paskal Janya, 49, Indian politician, Maharashtra MLA (2014–2019), COVID-19.
- Lazare Kaptué, 82, Cameroonian academic and virologist.
- André Maranne, 94, French-born British actor (The Pink Panther, The Square Peg, Night Train to Paris).
- David Mercier, 81, Canadian politician, British Columbia MLA (1986–1991).
- Mamikon Mnatsakanian, 78, Armenian physicist.
- Michel Noël, 76, Canadian writer.
- John Pelan, 63, American editor, publisher, and author, heart attack.
- Yogesh Praveen, 82, Indian historian.
- Irondi Pugliesi, 73, Brazilian politician, Paraná MLA (1983–1991, 1995–1999), COVID-19.
- Ibn Abdur Rehman, 90, Pakistani human rights activist.
- András Serfőző, 70, Hungarian politician, MP (1994–2006).
- Paull Shin, 85, American politician, member of the Washington House of Representatives (1993–1995) and Senate (1999–2014).
- Pedro Soares Martínez, 95, Portuguese politician and lawyer, minister of health (1962–1963).
- Carles Trullols i Clemente, 72, Spanish roller hockey player and coach, COVID-19.
- Vincent Vitetta, 95, French racing cyclist.
- Martin Wachs, 79, American urban planner.
- Galen Weston, 80, Canadian food processing executive, chairman of George Weston Limited (1975–2006).
- Yang Xiong, 67, Chinese politician, mayor of Shanghai (2012–2017), heart attack.
- Jalal Yousef, 41, Venezuelan nine-ball pool player.

=== 13 ===
- Farid Ahmed, 60, Bangladeshi composer and music director, COVID-19.
- Maqbul Ahmed, 81, Bangladeshi politician, COVID-19.
- Patricio Hacbang Alo, 81, Filipino Roman Catholic prelate, bishop of Mati (1984–2014).
- Jean-Pierre Arrignon, 78, French historian and academic.
- Rachel Bakam, 38, Nigerian television presenter and actress, complications from anaemia.
- Harold Bradley Jr., 91, American football player (Cleveland Browns, Philadelphia Eagles) and actor (Seven Rebel Gladiators).
- Geoff Crowther, 77, British travel writer, complications from dementia.
- Yvan Daumas, 77–78, French painter.
- R. W. Davies, 95, British historian and writer.
- Rocco Filippini, 77, Swiss classical cellist, COVID-19.
- Vasiliy Golovanov, 60, Russian writer and journalist.
- Gerald Haslam, 84, American author (Straight White Male).
- Dewey King, 95, American college football coach (San Jose State).
- Bruce Larson, 94, American college basketball coach (Arizona Wildcats).
- Isi Leibler, 86, Belgian-born Australian-Israeli activist.
- Bobby Leonard, 88, American Hall of Fame basketball coach (Indiana Pacers) and player (Los Angeles Lakers, Washington Wizards).
- Simon Marandi, 73, Indian politician, MP (1989–1996).
- Jaime Mota de Farias, 95, Brazilian Roman Catholic prelate, bishop of Alagoinhas (1986–2002), complications from Alzheimer's disease.
- Ted Murphy, 85, Irish wine historian and writer.
- Bernard Noël, 90, French writer and poet.
- Paul Oquist, 78, American-born Nicaraguan politician and presidential advisor, COVID-19.
- Jamal Al-Qabendi, 62, Kuwaiti footballer (Kazma, national team), complications from diabetes.
- George Reynolds, 84, British businessman and football club owner (Darlington).
- José Carlos Schiavinato, 66, Brazilian engineer and politician, deputy (since 2015) and mayor of Toledo (2005–2013), COVID-19.
- Ruth Roberta de Souza, 52, Brazilian Olympic basketball player (1992), world champion (1994), COVID-19.
- Walter Spitzer, 93, Polish-born French Holocaust survivor and painter, COVID-19.
- Amedeo Tommasi, 85, Italian pianist and composer.
- Peter Warner, 90, Australian sailor, winner of the Sydney to Hobart Yacht Race (1961, 1963, 1964), drowned.
- Helen Weaver, 89, American writer and translator.
- Bob Wheeler, 90, American ice hockey player.
- George Vande Woude, 85, American scientist, Parkinson's disease.

=== 14 ===
- Yıldırım Akbulut, 85, Turkish politician, prime minister (1989–1991), minister of interior (1984–1987) and speaker of the Grand National Assembly (1987–1989, 1999–2000).
- Maamoon Sami Rasheed al-Alwani, 63, Iraqi politician, governor of Anbar (2005–2009).
- Frank Card, 76, American basketball player (Minnesota Pipers, Carolina Cougars, Denver Rockets).
- Einar Enevoldson, 88, American aviator and test pilot.
- Eduardo Enríquez Maya, 72, Colombian politician, senator (since 2006) and representative (1998–2006), COVID-19.
- Trader Faulkner, 93, Australian-born British actor (A Killer Walks, The Murder Game, A High Wind in Jamaica).
- Hank Huckaby, 79, American politician, member of the Georgia House of Representatives (2011).
- Bernhard Kadenbach, German biochemist.
- Abdul Matin Khasru, 71, Bangladeshi politician, MP (1991–2001, since 2009), minister of law and justice (1997–2001), COVID-19.
- Shamsuzzaman Khan, 80, Bangladeshi folklorist, president of Bangla Academy (since 2020), COVID-19.
- Joaquín Larroya, 83, Spanish Olympic sprint canoer (1960).
- Graeme Lee, 81, Australian footballer (Launceston, East Devonport).
- Michel Louvain, 83, Canadian singer, esophageal cancer.
- Bernie Madoff, 82, American investment advisor, financier and convicted fraudster (Madoff investment scandal).
- Oleg Marusev, 76, Russian actor (Who If Not Us, The Fall of the Empire) and TV presenter, Merited Artist of the Russian Federation (1993).
- Bob Maskell, 80, Canadian politician, Alberta MLA (2001–2004).
- Marcelo Angiolo Melani, 82, Italian-born Argentine Roman Catholic prelate, bishop of Viedma (1995–2002) and Neuquén (2002–2011), COVID-19.
- Lindani Myeni, 29, South African rugby player, shot.
- Leo Nosworthy, 93, Australian rugby league player (Balmain) and coach.
- Sir Harry Ognall, 87, English jurist.
- Monique Pantel, 88, French film critic.
- Tati Penna, 61, Chilean singer, journalist and television personality, cancer.
- Inga Sarri, 86, Swedish actress.
- Stephanie Sinclaire, 67, American painter and theatre director.
- Roger Soloman, 81, Canadian politician, Prince Edward Island MLA (1993–1996).
- Nicholas Springer, 35, American wheelchair rugby player, Paralympic champion (2008).
- Lynn Thomas, 61, American football player (San Francisco 49ers, Oakland Invaders), Super Bowl champion (1982).
- Ahmed Usman, 69, Nigerian politician, military governor of Ondo State (1994–1996) and Oyo State (1996–1998).
- Ewa Wawrzoń, 83, Polish actress.
- Rusty Young, 75, American musician (Poco) and songwriter ("Crazy Love", "Shoot for the Moon"), heart attack.
- Kostas Zolotas, 87, Greek mountain guide.

=== 15 ===
- John Anthony Allan, 84, British geographer.
- Moshe Ber Beck, 86, Hungarian-born American rabbi and anti-Zionist campaigner, leader of the Neturei Karta, complications of COVID-19.
- Poul Bilde, 83, Danish footballer (Vejle, national team).
- Patricio Castillo, 80, Mexican actor (National Mechanics, Letters from Marusia, Amores perros).
- Dário de Castro, 72, Brazilian voice actor, COVID-19.
- Azmeera Chandulal, 66, Indian politician, MP (1996–1999), Andhra Pradesh MLA (1985–1989, 1994–1996) and Telangana MLA (since 2014), COVID-19.
- Aleksandr Churilin, 74, Russian diplomat, ambassador to Romania (2006–2011).
- Roger Dewint, 78, Belgian artist.
- Roscoe Dixon, 71, American politician, member of the Tennessee House of Representatives (1984–1994) and Senate (1994–2005).
- Clotilda Douglas-Yakimchuk, 89, Canadian nurse, COVID-19.
- Leon van den Eijkel, 80, Dutch-born New Zealand artist.
- Denis Field, 90, English triple jumper.
- Jorge Fitch, 87, Mexican baseball player (Tigres del México, Pericos de Puebla).
- Ron Giffin, 78, Canadian politician, Nova Scotia MLA (1978–1993).
- Vartan Gregorian, 87, Iranian-born Armenian-American academic, president of Carnegie Corporation.
- Eric Grove, 73, British naval historian.
- Knut Jøran Helmers, 64, Norwegian chess player, cerebral hemorrhage.
- Walter Kaufmann, 97, German-Australian writer.
- Leroy Keyes, 74, American Hall of Fame football player (Philadelphia Eagles, Kansas City Chiefs).
- Mao Ayuth, 76, Cambodian film director, COVID-19.
- John C. McAdams, 75, American political scientist.
- Bill McCall, 91, British trade union leader, general secretary of the IPMS (1963–1989).
- Evelyn McNicol, 93, Scottish explorer.
- Tom Sailí Ó Flaithearta, 89–90, Irish actor (Ros na Rún, Poitín).
- Nikolai Olovyannikov, 98, Russian military pilot, Hero of the Soviet Union (1944).
- Luisa Revilla, 49, Peruvian politician and LGBT rights activist, mayor of Trujillo Province (2015–2018), COVID-19.
- Hedley Ringrose, 78, English clergyman, archdeacon of Cheltenham (1998–2009).
- Pat Rizzo, 79, American saxophonist (Sly and the Family Stone).
- Akeel Al Saffar, Iraqi politician.
- Joe T. San Agustin, 90, Guamanian politician, member (1977–1996) and speaker (1989–1995) of the Senate.
- Kunio Shimizu, 84, Japanese playwright.
- Adelino Sitoy, 85, Filipino lawyer, COVID-19.
- Heather Spears, 86, Canadian-born Danish poet and novelist.
- Dimitrios Talaganis, 76, Greek architect, COVID-19.
- Vito Di Terlizzi, 90, Italian Olympic long-distance runner (1960).
- Bill Thieben, 86, American basketball player (Detroit Pistons).

=== 16 ===
- Hussain Ahmed, 89, Indian Olympic footballer (1956), COVID-19.
- Ole Anthony, 82, American minister, religious investigator and satirist, lung cancer.
- Edwin Apps, 89, English actor (The Bargee, The Messenger: The Story of Joan of Arc, Vatel).
- Fred Arbanas, 82, American football player (Dallas Texans/Kansas City Chiefs).
- Heinze Bakker, 79, Dutch sports journalist (Nederlandse Omroep Stichting).
- Umberto Battist, 81, French politician, deputy (1981–1986, 1988–1993).
- Al Bryant, 90, American football player (Edmonton Eskimos).
- Nader Dastneshan, 61, Iranian football player (Nassaji Mazandaran) and manager (Payam Mashad, Rayka Babol), COVID-19.
- John Dawes, 80, Welsh rugby union player (Barbarian, British & Irish Lions, national team).
- Robert Delgado, 46, American homeless man, shot.
- Jonathan Fryer, 70, British writer and politician, brain tumour.
- Charles Geschke, 81, American computer scientist, co-founder of Adobe Inc., co-developer of Interpress and PostScript.
- Henri Goetschy, 94, French politician, senator (1977–1995).
- Ludmila Guzun, 59, Moldovan politician, deputy (since 2019), COVID-19.
- Nelson Haggerty, 47, American college basketball coach (North Texas Mean Green, Central Missouri Mules, Midwestern State Mustangs), traffic collision.
- Fumio Hisamatsu, 77, Japanese manga artist (Super Jetter), mouth cancer.
- Bob Hodges, 77, Canadian Olympic speed skater (1968, 1972) and biochemist.
- Claude Jamet, 91, French footballer (LB Châteauroux).
- Jean Kaltenbach, 94, French politician, mayor of Eurville-Bienville (1965–2001).
- Daniel Kane, 73, Australian linguist.
- Krešimir Krnjević, 93, Croatian-born Canadian-British neurophysiologist.
- Ladi Ladebo, 78, Nigerian filmmaker.
- Lew Lewis, 65–66, English harmonica player (Eddie and the Hot Rods).
- Geoffrey Mains, 87, English cricketer (Gloucestershire).
- Barry Mason, 85, English songwriter ("Love Grows (Where My Rosemary Goes)", "The Last Waltz", "Delilah").
- Helen McCrory, 52, English actress (Peaky Blinders, Harry Potter, The Queen), breast cancer.
- Mike Mitchell, 77, American guitarist (The Kingsmen).
- Serhiy Novikov, 71, Russian judoka, Olympic champion (1976).
- Richard Parry-Jones, 69, British automobile designer (Ford Motor Company).
- Andrew Peacock, 82, Australian politician, minister for foreign affairs (1975–1980), leader of the opposition (1983–1985, 1989–1990) and MP (1966–1994).
- Johnny Peirson, 95, Canadian ice hockey player (Boston Bruins) and broadcaster.
- Anthony Powell, 85, English costume designer (Death on the Nile, Tess, Indiana Jones and the Last Crusade), Oscar winner (1973, 1979, 1981).
- Eldar Quliyev, 80, Azerbaijani film director (Babek), screenwriter and actor.
- Kakarla Subba Rao, 96, Indian radiologist.
- Éric Raoult, 65, French politician, deputy (2002–2012) and mayor of Le Raincy (1995–2014).
- Yessengaly Raushanov, 63, Kazakh poet.
- Liam Scarlett, 35, British choreographer (The Royal Ballet), suicide.
- Paul Schneider, 93, German sculptor, recipient of the Order of Merit of the Federal Republic of Germany.
- Robert Seibert, 79, American political scientist (Knox College).
- Felix Silla, 84, Italian-born American actor (The Addams Family, The Black Bird, Return of the Jedi) and stuntman, pancreatic cancer.
- Ranjit Sinha, 68, Indian police officer, director of the Central Bureau of Investigation (2012–2014), COVID-19.
- Sohaib Sultan, 40, American imam, chaplain at Princeton University, bile duct cancer.
- Mari Törőcsik, 85, Hungarian actress (Electra, My Love, Music Box, Sunshine).
- Loyce W. Turner, 93, American politician, member of the Georgia State Senate (1975–1998).

=== 17 ===
- Hisham Bastawisy, 69, Egyptian jurist.
- Ted Bates, 84, American football player (St. Louis Cardinals, New York Jets).
- Black Rob, 52, American rapper ("Whoa!", "Bad Boy for Life"), kidney failure.
- John Brereton, 86, Australian footballer (Footscray).
- Luiz Humberto Carneiro, 68, Brazilian politician, Minas Gerais MLA (since 2003), COVID-19.
- Vladimir Churkin, 68, Russian football player and manager.
- Erol Demiröz, 81, Turkish actor (The Herd, A Season in Hakkari, The Pain).
- Hubert Faure, 106, French World War II hero (Operation Overlord), Grand Cross of the Legion of Honour.
- Bob Fouracre, 83, American sportscaster.
- Fereydoun Ghanbari, 43, Iranian wrestler, pancreatitis.
- Paul Helminger, 80, Luxembourgish politician, mayor of Luxembourg City (1999−2011) and deputy (1984–1989, 1994–2012).
- Hsu Sheng-fa, 96, Taiwanese banker, auto executive and politician, MP (1981–1990), founder of Prince Motors and chairman of KGI Bank (1992–2007).
- Frank Judd, Baron Judd, 86, British politician, minister of state for foreign affairs (1977–1979), MP (1966–1979) and member of the House of Lords (since 1991).
- Kabori, 70, Bangladeshi actress (Titash Ekti Nadir Naam, Sareng Bou) and politician, MP (2008–2014), COVID-19.
- Franklin Khan, Trinidadian politician, MP (since 2002).
- Sebastian Koto Khoarai, 91, Lesothan Roman Catholic cardinal, bishop of Mohale's Hoek (1977–2014).
- Osamu Kobayashi, 57, Japanese animator (Ani*Kuri15, Naruto, Grandia), colon infection.
- Narendra Kohli, 81, Indian novelist and academic, COVID-19.
- Mick Lowe, 73, Canadian journalist (The Globe and Mail, Financial Post), complications from a fall.
- Bir Singh Mahato, 75, Indian politician, MP (1991–2004).
- Justin Malewezi, 77, Malawian politician, vice president (1994–2004).
- Gert Metz, 79, German Olympic sprinter (1968).
- Bill Mogk, 89, American baseball player (Michigan Wolverines).
- Manoj Kumar Mukherjee, 87, Indian jurist, judge of the Supreme Court (1993–1999).
- Josep Mussons, 95, Spanish sports and baking executive, vice president of FC Barcelona (1979–2000), COVID-19.
- John Ogilvie, 89, New Zealand cricketer (Wellington).
- Sir Michael Oswald, 86, British horse racing manager.
- Mario Pini, 82, Uruguayan footballer (Montevideo Wanderers).
- K. C. Ramrakha, 88, Fijian lawyer and politician, member of the Legislative Council (1966–1970) and House of Representatives (1970–1982).
- Robert Carl Suggs, 89, American archaeologist and anthropologist, heart failure.
- Sándor Szabó, 70, Hungarian Olympic swimmer (1968, 1972).
- Wayne Talkes, 68, English footballer (Southampton, AFC Bournemouth).
- Vivek, 59, Indian actor (Run, Saamy, Parthiban Kanavu) and comedian, cardiac arrest.
- Hans-Karl von Unger, 90, German politician, member of the Landtag of North Rhine-Westphalia (1980–1995).
- Harry W. Wellford, 96, American jurist, judge of the U.S. District Court for Western Tennessee (1970–1982) and the U.S. Court of Appeals for the Sixth Circuit (since 1982).
- Volodymyr Yavorivsky, 78, Ukrainian writer, journalist and politician, MP (1990–1998, 2002–2014), stroke.
- Al Young, 81, American poet, complications from a stroke.

=== 18 ===
- Naïma Ababsa, 58, Algerian singer.
- Xavier Ameil, 98, French engineer and spy.
- Ludovico Badoy, 69, Filipino politician, executive director of the NHCP (2002–2019), COVID-19.
- Helmut Barbe, 93, German composer.
- Bhumidhar Barman, 89, Indian politician, Assam MLA (1967–2016) and chief minister (1996).
- Michael Bedford-Jones, 78, Canadian suffragan bishop, COVID-19.
- Douglas Bell, 94, Canadian politician, commissioner of Yukon (1979–1986).
- Stefan Bratkowski, 86, Polish journalist and writer, opposition activist during Polish People's Republic.
- Jehanne Collard, 70, French lawyer and activist.
- Luigi Covatta, 77, Italian politician and journalist (Mondoperaio), deputy (1979–1983) and senator (1983–1994).
- Malcolm R. Currie, 94, American aerospace engineer.
- Marva Dawn, 72, American theologian and author.
- Mary Earle, 91, Scottish-born New Zealand food technologist.
- Flavia Fontes, 60, Brazilian filmmaker and editor.
- Elizabeth Furse, 84, Kenya Colony-born American politician, member of the U.S. House of Representatives (1993–1999), complications from a fall.
- Iain Gallaway, 98, New Zealand sports commentator and cricketer (Otago).
- Achyut Madhav Gokhale, 75, Indian civil servant, COVID-19.
- Ken Greenwood, 79, Australian footballer (Carlton, Footscray).
- Mohammad Hejazi, 65, Iranian military officer (IRGC), heart disease.
- Gazi M M Amjad Hossain, 71, Bangladeshi politician, MP (2014–2018).
- Choida Jamtsho, 56, Bhutanese politician, MP (since 2008), food poisoning.
- Jyoti Kalani, 70, Indian politician, Maharashtra MLA (2014–2019), heart attack.
- Hanna Lachert, 94, Polish architect.
- Frank McCabe, 93, American basketball player, Olympic champion (1952).
- Eric McGraw, 76, British publisher, founder of the Inside Time.
- S. M. Mohsin, 73, Bangladeshi actor, COVID-19.
- Abdullah Al Nauri, 62, Emirati novelist and police officer, chronic heart condition.
- Susan Odom, 40, British chemist, fall.
- Nowa Omoigui, 62, Nigerian military historian and cardiologist.
- Paul Oscher, 74, American blues musician, COVID-19.
- Albert Papilaya, 53, Indonesian Olympic boxer (1992).
- Bachi Singh Rawat, 71, Indian politician, MP (1996–2009), COVID-19.
- Zdeněk Růžička, 96, Czech gymnast, Olympic bronze medalist (1948).
- Anthony Russo, 74, American politician, mayor of Hoboken (1993–2001).
- Richard Schmid, 86, American artist.
- Howard Schuman, 93, American sociologist.
- Lucas Sirkar, 84, Indian Roman Catholic prelate, bishop of Krishnagar (1984–2000) and archbishop of Calcutta (2002–2012).
- Tremaine Stewart, 33, Jamaican footballer (Aalesund, Waterhouse, national team).
- A. Pappa Sundaram, 89, Indian politician, Tamil Nadu MLA (1989–2016), lung congestion.
- Yvette Swan, 75, Bermudian politician.
- Necdet Üruğ, 100, Turkish military officer, chief of the General Staff (1983–1987), commander of the First Army (1978–1981) and Land Forces (1983), complications from COVID-19.
- Wasim, 74, Bangladeshi actor.
- J. Welles Wilder Jr., 85, American mechanical engineer and real estate developer.

=== 19 ===
- Eddie Abel, 89, British chemist, president of the Royal Society of Chemistry (1996–1998).
- Monica Bandini, 56, Italian racing cyclist, world champion (1988), heart attack.
- Pedro Bastidas, 45, Venezuelan politician, mayor of Girardot Municipality (since 2008), COVID-19.
- Sumitra Bhave, 78, Indian film director (Doghi, Devrai, Kaasav), lung infection.
- Andrzej Białynicki-Birula, 85, Polish mathematician, member of the Polish Academy of Sciences.
- Rudolf Burger, 82, Austrian philosopher.
- Marjorie Caserio, 92, English chemist.
- Mewalal Chaudhary, 68, Indian politician, Bihar MLA (since 2015), COVID-19.
- Eduardo de Lázzari, 76, Argentine judge and academic, president of the Supreme Court of Justice of Buenos Aires (2004–2005, 2012–2013, 2019–2020), COVID-19.
- Michael Dormer, 83, New Zealand cricketer (Auckland).
- Nasir Durrani, 64, Pakistani police officer, inspector general of the Khyber Pakhtunkhwa Police (2013–2017), COVID-19.
- Ruth Farchi, 93, Austrian-Israeli stage actress.
- Mario Gonzalez, 26, American chef and construction worker, homicide.
- J. Philip Grime, 85, American ecologist.
- Shaler Halimon, 76, American basketball player (Philadelphia 76ers, Portland Trail Blazers, Dallas Chaparrals).
- Fred Jordan, 95, American book and magazine editor (Grove Press, Evergreen Review) and free speech activist.
- Michel Kilo, 80, Syrian writer and human rights activist, COVID-19.
- Willy van der Kuijlen, 74, Dutch footballer (PSV, MVV, national team), complications from Alzheimer's disease.
- Bob Lanois, 73, Canadian record producer and recording engineer.
- Vera Lantratova, 73, Russian volleyball player, Olympic champion (1968).
- Walter Mondale, 93, American politician, vice president (1977–1981), senator (1964–1976), and ambassador to Japan (1993–1996).
- Gérard Montassier, 83, French essayist and government official.
- Jagdish Singh Rana, 66, Indian politician, MP (2009–2014), COVID-19.
- Anto Raukas, 86, Estonian geologist and science organiser.
- Birgitte Reimer, 95, Danish actress (We Who Go the Kitchen Route, Summer Place Wanted, Vi er allesammen tossede).
- Reg Saner, 92, American poet.
- Gopal Krishna Saxena, 70, Indian politician, Uttar Pradesh MLA (1996–2002), COVID-19.
- Viktor Shuvalov, 97, Russian ice hockey player and footballer (VVS Moscow), Olympic champion (1956), COVID-19.
- Jim Speechley, 84, British politician, leader of the Lincolnshire County Council (1997–2002).
- Jim Steinman, 73, American musician, composer and lyricist ("Total Eclipse of the Heart", "I'd Do Anything for Love (But I Won't Do That)", "It's All Coming Back to Me Now"), kidney failure.
- Nalla Thomas, 75, Indian Baptist pastor.
- Dieter Timpe, 89, German historian.
- Franklin Toker, 76, Canadian-born American architectural historian.
- G. Venkatasubbiah, 107, Indian lexicographer, kidney disease.
- Marin Voinea, 85, Romanian footballer (Progresul București, Siderurgistul Galați, national team).
- Robin Wood, 67, American artist, cancer.
- Bill Wynne, 99, American World War II veteran, photojournalist and dog trainer (Smoky).

=== 20 ===
- Germaine Ahidjo, 89, Cameroonian socialite, first lady (1960–1982).
- Ruth H. Alexander, 83, American activist.
- Pierre Amiet, 98, French archeologist and conservator.
- Rex Aubrey, 86, Australian Olympic swimmer (1952).
- Leïla Bahria, Tunisian politician and judge, secretary of state to the minister of foreign affairs (2013–2014).
- Mick Burrs, 81, Canadian poet.
- Thomas F. Coleman, 70, Canadian mathematician and computer scientist, cancer.
- George Dancis, 88, Latvian-born Australian Olympic basketball player (1956).
- Idriss Déby, 68, Chadian military officer and politician, president (since 1990), shot.
- Mary Beth Edelson, 88, American artist.
- Nasser Ramdane Ferradj, 49, French political activist.
- Germán Gamonal, 89, Chilean journalist and writer.
- Roland J. Green, 76, American author (Conan the Valiant, Janissaries II: Clan and Crown, Great Kings' War).
- Monte Hellman, 91, American film director (Two-Lane Blacktop, Beast from Haunted Cave, The Shooting), fall.
- Willi Herren, 45, German actor and singer.
- Emilia Monjowa Lifaka, 62, Cameroonian politician, member (since 2002) and vice president (since 2009) of the National Assembly, chair of the Commonwealth Parliamentary Association (since 2017).
- Jiří Lopata, 84, Czech football player (Spartak Plzeň) and manager (RH Cheb, Dukla Prague).
- Wiesława Mazurkiewicz, 95, Polish actress (Pharaoh, The Deluge, Woman in a Hat).
- Les McKeown, 65, Scottish singer (Bay City Rollers).
- Ana Lúcia Menezes, 46, Brazilian actress, voice artist and dubbing director, stroke.
- Shyam Bihari Misra, 82, Indian politician, MP (1991–2004), COVID-19.
- Kishore Nandlaskar, 81, Indian actor (Thartharat, Vaastav: The Reality, Jis Desh Mein Ganga Rehta Hain), COVID-19.
- M. Narasimham, 93, Indian economist, governor of the Reserve Bank of India (1977).
- Shirley Ogle, 94, Australian sprinter.
- Sven-Olof Olson, 94, Swedish Air Force officer.
- Listianto Raharjo, 50, Indonesian footballer (Pelita Jaya, national team), heart attack.
- José Joaquín Puig de la Bellacasa, 89, Spanish diplomat, ambassador to the Holy See (1980–1983), secretary general of the Royal Household (1990–1991), member of the Council of State (1997–2005), COVID-19.
- Tom Robson, 75, American baseball player (Texas Rangers) and coach (New York Mets).
- Céline Roos, 67, French-Canadian chess player.
- Zurab Rtveliashvili, 53, Kazakh-born Georgian poet, blood clot.
- John Sarna, 86, American politician, member of the Minnesota House of Representatives (1973–1996).
- Aleksander Sopliński, 79, Polish politician and physician, deputy (2005–2011), deputy minister of health (2012–2015).
- Tempest Storm, 93, American burlesque star and actress.
- Alfred Teinitzer, 91, Austrian footballer (SK Rapid Wien, LASK Linz, national team).
- Roland Weyl, 102, French lawyer and militant.
- Panagiotis Xoblios, 25, Greek footballer (Veria, Panegialios, Kallithea), heart attack.

=== 21 ===
- Albert Bauer, 92, American politician, member of the Washington House of Representatives (1971–1981) and Senate (1981–2001).
- Ljerka Belak, 73, Slovenian actress, Prešeren Award (1989).
- Marc Bécam, 89, French politician, deputy (1967–1978), senator (1980–1986), mayor of Quimper (1977–1989).
- Håkon Brusveen, 93, Norwegian cross-country skier, Olympic champion (1960).
- A.K. Chatterjee, 95, Indian philosopher and Buddhist scholar.
- Gilbert Clain, 79, Réunionese sculptor.
- Mercedes Colás de Meroño, 95, Argentine human rights activist (Mothers of the Plaza de Mayo).
- Myriam Colombi, 81, French actress (The Burglars, The Weaker Sex) and theatre director (Théâtre Montparnasse).
- Lea Dali Lion, 47, Estonian singer, COVID-19.
- Bhitali Das, 51, Indian singer, COVID-19.
- Peter Dimond, 82, Australian rugby league player (Western Suburbs, New South Wales, national team).
- Ásgeir Eyjólfsson, 91, Icelandic Olympic alpine skier.
- Marc Ferro, 96, French historian, COVID-19.
- Thomas Fritsch, 77, German actor (Three Men in the Snow, Uncle Tom's Cabin, Adorable Julia).
- Shankha Ghosh, 89, Indian poet and literary critic, COVID-19.
- Alfredo Graciani, 56, Argentine footballer (Boca Juniors, Racing Club, Deportivo Español), heart attack.
- Ada Jesus, 23, Nigerian actress and comedian, kidney disease and cardiac arrest.
- Bernie Kahn, 90, American screenwriter (The Barefoot Executive, Bewitched, Super Friends).
- Wahiduddin Khan, 96, Indian Islamic scholar (Tazkirul Quran) and peace activist, COVID-19.
- Kari Kemény, 71, Norwegian translator, Bastian Prize recipient (2001).
- Marian Kosiński, 75, Polish football player (Stal Mielec) and manager (Karpaty Krosno).
- Johny Lal, Indian cinematographer (Partner, Aathanka, Rehnaa Hai Terre Dil Mein), COVID-19.
- Joe Long, 88, American bassist (The Four Seasons), COVID-19.
- Gerry Mackey, 87, Irish footballer (Shamrock Rovers).
- Manny Mantrana, 56, American college baseball coach (St. Thomas Bobcats, UTPA).
- Segismundo Martínez Álvarez, 78, Spanish-born Brazilian Roman Catholic prelate, bishop of Corumbá (2004–2018), COVID-19.
- Tom Michalopoulos, 71, Greek-born Canadian businessman, founder of Coffee Time.
- Guilherme Melo, 68, Brazilian politician, governor of Piauí (1994–1995) and Piauí MLA (1987–1991), brain cancer.
- Stanley A. Milner, 91, Canadian businessman and politician.
- Henri Mouton, 87, Belgian politician, senator (1981–1985).
- Antonio Palang, 77, Filipino Roman Catholic prelate, vicar apostolic of San Jose in Mindoro (2002–2018).
- Margaret Pokiak-Fenton, 84, Canadian Inuvialuit author.
- James Prigoff, 93, American photographer.
- D. Michael Quinn, 77, American historian of the Latter Day Saint movement.
- Diamantina Rodríguez, 100, Spanish singer.
- Donald W. Sherburne, 92, American philosopher.
- Henrietta M. Smith, 98, American academic, librarian and storyteller.
- Carl Spielvogel, 92, American marketing executive and diplomat, ambassador to Slovakia (2000–2001).
- Nort Thornton, 87, American swimming coach.
- Erasmo Vásquez, Dominican physician and politician, minister of public health (1996–1998), COVID-19.
- Elizabeth von Till Warren, 86, American historian and preservationist.
- Wojciech Ziemba, 79, Polish Roman Catholic prelate, bishop of Ełk (1992–2000), archbishop of Białystok (2000–2006) and Warmia (2006–2016).

=== 22 ===
- Wencelito Andanar, 73, Filipino lawyer, chairman of the Philippine Coconut Authority (1982–1992), liver cancer.
- Adnan al-Assadi, 68–69, Iraqi politician, member of the Council of Representatives (2010–2011, 2014–2018), COVID-19.
- Dewan Singh Bhakuni, 90, Indian chemist.
- Bill Cameron, 92, Australian footballer (St Kilda).
- Terrence Clarke, 19, American basketball player (Kentucky Wildcats), traffic collision.
- Purushottam Naresh Dwivedi, 55, Indian politician, Uttar Pradesh MLA (2007–2011) and convicted rapist, kidney disease.
- Donald W. Fox, 98, American politician, member of the Pennsylvania House of Representatives (1957–1974).
- Alípio Freire, 75, Brazilian writer and journalist, COVID-19.
- Charles Fries, 92, American producer (The Amazing Spider-Man, The Martian Chronicles, Cat People).
- Edmundo Galdino, 62, Brazilian politician, deputy (1989–1995) and Goiás MLA (1987–1989), cardiac arrest.
- Adrian Garrett, 78, American baseball player (Chicago Cubs, California Angels, Hiroshima Toyo Carp), pneumonia.
- John Gilbert, 86, Canadian actor (By Way of the Stars, Halloween 5: The Revenge of Michael Myers, Rabid).
- Edgar Godoy Samayoa, Guatemalan politician and brigadier general, minister of the interior (2020).
- Bogomil Gjuzel, 82, Macedonian poet, playwright, and translator.
- Selma Gürbüz, 61, Turkish sculptor and painter, COVID-19.
- Mirosław Handke, 75, Polish chemist and politician, rector of AGH University of Science and Technology (1993–1997), minister of national education (1997–2000).
- Thelma Harper, 80, American politician, member of the Tennessee Senate (1989–2019).
- Dennis Johnson, 81, Jamaican Olympic sprinter (1964), complications from COVID-19.
- Cynthia Kenny, 91, British painter.
- Jean-Pierre Kress, 91, French footballer (national team).
- Luo Qingquan, 75, Chinese politician, governor of Hubei (2003–2007) and member of the CCCPC (2002–2012).
- Krystyna Łyczywek, 100, Polish photographer, translator and journalist, Golden Medal for Merit to Culture (2010), Officer of the Legion of Honour (2013).
- Roy Masters, 93, English-born American author, radio evangelist.
- Jacqueline Mofokeng, 61, South African politician, MNA (since 2019), member of the Gauteng Provincial Legislature (1999–2019), COVID-19.
- Elizabeth Orr, 91, New Zealand lecturer and trade unionist.
- Larry Leon Palmer, 71, American diplomat.
- Sharon Pollock, 85, Canadian playwright, actor and director.
- Shravan Rathod, 66, Indian film composer (Aashiqui, Raja, Bewafaa), COVID-19.
- Sumila Ronghangpi, 12, Indian housemaid.
- Frances Rotblat, 74, British haematologist, complications from diabetes.
- Shock G, 57, American rapper (Digital Underground) and songwriter ("The Humpty Dance", "I Get Around"), accidental drug overdose.
- Roy Strandbakke, 90, Norwegian footballer (Raufoss, national team).
- Anthony Thwaite, 90, English poet and editor.
- Ashok Kumar Walia, 72, Indian politician, Delhi MLA (1993–2013), COVID-19.

=== 23 ===
- N. A. Adjin-Tettey, 90, Ghanaian athlete.
- Hans Rasmus Astrup, 82, Norwegian businessman and art collector, founder of Astrup Fearnley Museum of Modern Art.
- Tuncay Becedek, 78, Turkish footballer (Fenerbahçe, İzmirspor, national team).
- Lalit Behl, 71, Indian actor (Titli, Hotel Salvation, Judgementall Hai Kya), film director and writer, complications from COVID-19.
- Abderrahmane Benkhalfa, 71, Algerian economist, minister of finance (2015–2016), COVID-19.
- Dukha Bhagat, 67, Indian politician, MP (1999–2004), COVID-19.
- Charlie Black, 71, American country songwriter.
- J. Jon Bruno, 74, American Episcopal clergyman, bishop of Los Angeles (2002–2017).
- José Luis Comellas, 92, Spanish astronomer, historian and academic.
- Levy Fidelix, 69, Brazilian politician, president of Brazilian Labour Renewal Party (since 1994), complications from COVID-19.
- Fredi, 78, Finnish actor, singer and television presenter.
- Charlie Glotzbach, 82, American racing driver (NASCAR Winston Cup Series).
- Sue Hayes, 69, British film and television executive, ovarian cancer.
- James Heneghan, 90, British-born Canadian author (The Grave).
- Bill Johnston, 96, American golfer and golf course designer.
- Dan Kaminsky, 42, American computer security researcher, diabetic ketoacidosis.
- Carl LaBove, 62, American stand-up comedian, cancer.
- Mario Meoni, 56, Argentine politician, minister of transport (since 2019), mayor of Junín Partido (2003–2015) and Buenos Aires provincial deputy (1999–2003), traffic collision.
- Milva, 81, Italian singer and actress (La bellezza di Ippolita, Appuntamento in riviera, Via degli specchi).
- Amit Mistry, 47, Indian actor (Kya Kehna, Ek Chalis Ki Last Local, 99), cardiac arrest.
- Arun Nigavekar, 79, Indian physicist and educator, vice-chancellor of the University of Pune (1998–2000) and chairman of the UGC (2000–2005).
- Detta O'Cathain, Baroness O'Cathain, 83, Irish-born British businesswoman and life peer, member of the House of Lords (since 1991).
- Suresh Srivastava, 76, Indian politician, Uttar Pradesh MLA (1996–2012, since 2017), COVID-19.
- Deborah Swackhamer, 66, American environmental chemist.
- Sirje Tennosaar, 77, Estonian actress and television presenter.
- Rammurti Singh Verma, 70, Indian politician, Uttar Pradesh MLA (2012–2017).
- Bill Whittington, 71, American racing driver and convicted criminal, 24 Hours of Le Mans winner (1979), plane crash.
- Victor Wood, 75, Filipino singer and actor, complications from COVID-19.

=== 24 ===
- Katherine Aaslestad, 59, American scholar, professor of history at West Virginia University.
- Awatef Abdel Karim, 90, Egyptian composer.
- Mutaib Alsaqar, 62, Jordanian singer, complications from diabetes.
- Kent Angus, 68, Canadian businessman and uniform supplier to the International Ice Hockey Federation
- Oleg Anikanov, 87, Russian military officer.
- Katherine Barber, 61, British-born Canadian lexicographer, brain cancer.
- Walter Borthwick, 73, Scottish football player (East Fife, St Mirren, Dunfermline Athletic) and manager.
- Vytautas Bubnys, 88, Lithuanian writer and politician, MP (1992–1996).
- Frank Calhoun, 88, American politician.
- John Coster-Mullen, 74, American photographer and nuclear archaeologist, complications from amyotrophic lateral sclerosis.
- Alber Elbaz, 59, Moroccan-born Israeli fashion designer (Lanvin), COVID-19.
- Sergio Esquivel, 74, Mexican singer-songwriter.
- Bob Fass, 87, American radio personality (WBAI).
- Marcel Gaudion, 97, French handball player (national team).
- Victor Golla, 82, American linguist, complications from Parkinson's disease and a stroke.
- Duane Hagadone, 88, American newspaper publisher.
- Nathan Jung, 74, American actor and stuntman (Star Trek, The A-Team, Big Trouble in Little China).
- Ziaur Rahman Khan, 75, Bangladeshi lawyer and politician, MP (1991–2006), COVID-19.
- Dariyav Khatik, 75, Indian politician, Haryana MLA (1991–1996).
- Shunsuke Kikuchi, 89, Japanese composer (The Gate of Youth, Dragon Ball Z, Grendizer), pneumonia.
- La Camboria, 90, Spanish flamenco dancer, COVID-19.
- Marianne Lienau, 85, German presenter, radio journalist and contributing editor.
- Kaare Lindboe, 81, Norwegian football referee.
- Richard Hey Lloyd, 87, British organist and composer.
- Christa Ludwig, 93, German mezzo-soprano.
- Eddie Miller, 76, American racing driver.
- Sarolta Monspart, 76, Hungarian orienteering competitor, world champion (1972).
- Knut Magne Myrland, 73, Norwegian singer, songwriter, and guitarist.
- Siv Nordrum, 62, Norwegian journalist.
- Virgil Orr, 98, American politician and academic, member of the Louisiana House of Representatives (1988–1992).
- Allan Pietz, 95, Canadian politician, MP (1984–1988), mayor of Welland (1965–1978), complications from pneumonia.
- Yves Rénier, 78, Swiss-born French actor (Commissaire Moulin, The Count of Monte Cristo, Frantic), film director and screenwriter.
- A. M. M. Safiullah, 73, Bangladeshi academic, complications from COVID-19.
- Faye Schulman, 101, Polish Holocaust survivor and photographer.
- Byron Seaman, 97, Canadian businessman, part owner of the Calgary Flames.
- Mohan Shantanagoudar, 62, Indian jurist, judge of the Supreme Court (since 2017) and Karnataka High Court (2004–2016), chief justice of the Kerala High Court (2016–2017), lung infection.
- Robert Slavin, 70, American psychologist.
- Trevor Smith, Baron Smith of Clifton, 83, British politician, member of the House of Lords (1997–2019), septicaemia.
- Miloš Šobajić, 75, Serbian painter and sculptor, COVID-19.
- József Soproni, 90, Hungarian composer.
- Onkar Nath Srivastava, 78, Indian physicist, COVID-19.
- Hugo Stuven, 80, Chilean-Spanish television producer (Televisión Española), COVID-19.
- Riitta Vainionpää, 69, Swedish textile artist, COVID-19.
- John T. Ward Jr., 75, American racehorse trainer.
- Ashwin Yadav, 33, Indian cricketer (Hyderabad), heart attack.

=== 25 ===
- Ali Yahia Abdennour, 100, Algerian politician, lawyer and human rights activist, member of the People's National Assembly (1962–1965), minister of public works and transport (1965–1966) and agriculture and agrarian reform (1966–1968).
- Genebert Basadre, 37, Filipino boxer.
- James P. Blair, 90, American photographer.
- Lee Boysel, 82, American electrical engineer and entrepreneur.
- Pablo José Cámbar, 78, Honduran academic, researcher and physician, COVID-19.
- Óscar Castro Ramírez, 73, Chilean playwright, actor (There Were Days... and Moons) and director, complications from COVID-19.
- Mike Davis, 65, American football player (Oakland/Los Angeles Raiders).
- Raymond J. DeMallie, 74, American anthropologist.
- John Diamond, 86, British physician and author.
- Ben Dreith, 96, American football referee (American Football League, National Football League).
- Denny Freeman, 76, American blues guitarist and keyboardist.
- Ian Hamilton, 80, English footballer (Bristol Rovers).
- Ivan M. Havel, 82, Czech scientist and philosopher.
- John Hopkins, 82, American novelist and travel writer, fall.
- Hamid Jasemian, 84, Iranian footballer (Shahin, Persepolis), COVID-19.
- Toshiro Kandagawa, 81, Japanese chef (Iron Chef), COVID-19.
- Ago-Endrik Kerge, 82, Estonian ballet dancer and master.
- Désiré Kolingba, 64, Central African politician, member of the National Assembly (1998–2004), minister of youth and sports (2004–2009).
- John Konrads, 78, Latvian-born Australian swimmer, Olympic champion (1960).
- Joseph Maraite, 71, Belgian politician, minister-president of the German-speaking community (1986–1999).
- Rajan Mishra, 70, Indian khyal musician, complications from COVID-19.
- Cyrille Ndayirukiye, 66, Burundian politician, minister of national defence (2000–2002).
- Valerie Parv, 69, Australian author.
- Harry Setyawan, 45, Indonesian naval officer, submarine accident.
- Allen Taflove, 71, American electrical engineer.
- Zhenia Vasylkivska, 92, Ukrainian poet, translator and literary critic.
- Potti Veerayya, 73, Indian actor (Aggi Veerudu, Tata Manavadu, Yugandhar) and comedian.
- William T. Wiley, 83, American artist, complications from Parkinson's disease.
- André de Witte, 76, Belgian-born Brazilian Roman Catholic prelate, bishop of Ruy Barbosa (1994–2020), septic shock and infectious cellulitis.
- Jim Yates, 92, American politician.

=== 26 ===
- Manzoor Ahtesham, 73, Indian writer, COVID-19.
- José Luis Álvarez de Castro, 102, Spanish politician, member of the Cortes Españolas (1969–1971) and president of the province of Cuenca (1969–1971).
- Charles Beeson, 63, British television director (EastEnders, Supernatural, The Mentalist), heart attack.
- David Beriáin, 43, Spanish journalist and documentary filmmaker, shot.
- Waman Bhonsle, 89, Indian film editor (Inkaar, Dostana, Agneepath).
- Harold Boatrite, 89, American composer.
- Kavi Daad, 79, Indian poet.
- Rao Dharampal, 79, Indian politician, Haryana MLA (1987–1996, 2000–2005, since 2019).
- Austin Flynn, 87–88, Irish hurler (Waterford).
- Roberto Fraile, 47, Spanish journalist and cameraman, shot.
- Peter Gelson, 79, English footballer (Brentford, Hillingdon Borough, Hounslow).
- Sanjay Gupta, Indian entrepreneur.
- Julie Gutz, 94, American baseball player (Springfield Sallies, Muskegon Lassies, Kenosha Comets).
- Geno Hayes, 33, American football player (Tampa Bay Buccaneers, Jacksonville Jaguars, Chicago Bears), liver disease.
- Erik Heinrichs, 88, Finnish diplomat.
- Lia Hinten, 78, Dutch Olympic pentathlete (1964).
- Robert Houston, 85, American photographer.
- Hirotaka Izumi, 62, Japanese keyboardist, heart failure.
- Adam Kolton, 53, American environmentalist, cancer.
- Cees Koppelaar, 81, Dutch athlete and field hockey coach (HC Bloemendaal).
- Trudie Lamb-Richmond, 89, American Schaghticoke educator and author.
- Vassos Lyssarides, 100, Cypriot politician, member (1960–2006) and president (1985–1991) of the House of Representatives, founder of EDEK.
- Dick Mann, 86, American Hall of Fame motorcycle racer.
- Diego Martel, 73, Spanish Olympic swimmer (1968).
- Florence Piron, 54, French-Canadian anthropologist and ethicist.
- Tamara Press, 83, Ukrainian-born Russian shot putter and discus thrower, Olympic champion (1960, 1964).
- Ramu, 53, Indian film producer (A. K. 47, Lockup Death, Kalasipalya), COVID-19.
- Al Schmitt, 91, American recording engineer (RCA Records, Capitol Studios).
- Pam Seaborne, 85, British Olympic hurdler (1952).
- Sugrib Singh, 57, Indian politician, MP (2004–2009), COVID-19.
- Rashid Sweissat, 18, Jordanian boxer, injuries sustained in fight.
- Charles de Vaulx, 59, French investor, suicide by jumping.
- Jan Verhoeven, 80, Dutch singer.
- Peter Vogel, 81, Swiss Olympic cyclist (1960).

=== 27 ===
- Gonzalo Aguirre Ramírez, 81, Uruguayan politician, vice president (1990–1995) and senator (1985–1990).
- Fawzia Al-Abbasi, 80, Egyptian television journalist.
- Marghoob Banihali, 84, Indian poet.
- Sidnal Shanmukhappa Basappa, 85, Indian politician, MP (1980–1996).
- Nicholas Cheong Jin-suk, 89, South Korean Roman Catholic cardinal, bishop of Cheongju (1970–1998) and archbishop of Seoul (1998–2012).
- Paul Couter, 72, Belgian guitarist (TC Matic).
- Frank Cox, 80, British television director (Doctor Who, Take the High Road).
- Dave Cull, 71, New Zealand politician, mayor of Dunedin (2010–2019), pancreatic cancer.
- Manoj Das, 87, Indian writer.
- Ed Diener, 74, American psychologist and author.
- Miroslav Fryčer, 61, Czech ice hockey player (HC Vítkovice, Toronto Maple Leafs) and coach (Orli Znojmo).
- Jan Stefan Gałecki, 88, Polish Roman Catholic prelate, auxiliary bishop of Szczecin-Kamień (1974–2007), COVID-19.
- Imre Horváth, 76, Hungarian politician, member of the National Assembly (2014–2018).
- Louis Sager Hunsucker Jr., 87, American poker player.
- Aristóbulo Istúriz, 74, Venezuelan politician and academic, vice president (2016–2017) and minister of education (since 2018).
- Bleddyn Jones, 72, Welsh rugby commentator.
- Kakhi Kavsadze, 85, Georgian actor (White Sun of the Desert, Melodies of Vera Quarter, The Wishing Tree), complications from COVID-19.
- George P. Kazen, 81, American jurist, judge (1979–2018) and chief judge (1996–2003) of the U.S. District Court for Southern Texas.
- Anita Lane, 61, Australian singer-songwriter (Nick Cave and the Bad Seeds).
- John Latham, 83, British climate physicist.
- Marie-Françoise Leclère, 79, French journalist (Elle, Le Point), cancer.
- Isaac Mogase, 87, South African politician, mayor of Johannesburg (1995–2000).
- Leela Nambudiripad, 86, Indian children's author.
- René Padilla, 88, Ecuadorian evangelical theologian and missiologist.
- Rameshwar Patidar, 82, Indian politician, MP (1977–1979, 1989–1999), heart attack.
- Jean-Guy Pilon, 90, Canadian poet.
- Frances Sherwood, 80, American author.
- Karuna Shukla, 70, Indian politician, MP (2009–2014), COVID-19.
- Pedro Soto, 70, Spanish politician, deputy (1996–2000), stroke.
- Charles Strum, 73, American journalist (The New York Times) and author, glioblastoma.
- Thamira, 53, Indian film director (Rettaisuzhi, Aan Devathai), COVID-19.
- Chittoor Venugopal, 93, Indian military officer, cardiac arrest.
- Rory Young, 48, Irish conservationist, shot.
- Franklin Zielski, 80, Canadian Olympic rower (1960).

=== 28 ===
- Mara Abrantes, 86, Brazilian-Portuguese singer and actress (A Canção da Saudade, Malandros em Quarta Dimensão).
- Francisco de Andrade, 97, Portuguese Olympic sailor.
- Thomas R. Berger, 88, Canadian politician and jurist, MP (1962–1963) and British Columbia MLA (1966–1969), cancer.
- Michael Collins, 90, American astronaut (Apollo 11), assistant secretary of state for public affairs (1970–1971), cancer.
- Toni Dalli, 88, Italian musician and restaurateur.
- Madeline Davis, 80, American LGBT activist and historian.
- Celso Dayrit, 69, Filipino fencer and sports executive, COVID-19.
- Anish Deb, 69, Indian writer, COVID-19.
- Joseph Pokossy Doumbe, 88, Cameroonian politician, deputy (1970–1973).
- Hussein Faris, 85, Israeli politician, member of the Knesset (1988–1992).
- François Fédier, 85, French philosopher and translator.
- Miguel Ángel Furones, 71, Spanish writer and creative director (Leo Burnett Worldwide, Publicis), COVID-19.
- Eknath Gaikwad, 81, Indian politician, MP (2004–2014) and Maharashtra MLA (1985–1995, 1999–2004), COVID-19.
- Janardan Singh Gehlot, Indian sports administrator, founder of the International Kabaddi Federation.
- Karl Ingebrigtsen, 85, Norwegian politician, deputy MP (1973–1981).
- Claude Jasmin, 90, Canadian journalist, broadcaster, and writer.
- Walt Jenkins, 90, American football player (Detroit Lions, Hamilton Tiger-Cats).
- Anthony Johnson, 82, Jamaican politician, diplomat, and economist, MP (1980–2008).
- Clyde Leon, 37, Trinidadian footballer (Arima Fire, W Connection, national team).
- Jason Matthews, 69, American author (Red Sparrow), complications from corticobasal degeneration.
- Min Guirong, 87, Chinese thermophysicist and space technologist, Ho Leung Ho Lee Foundation award winner (1996).
- Jim Monachino, 91, American football player (San Francisco 49ers, Washington Redskins).
- Steve Perks, 58, English footballer (Shrewsbury Town).
- Louis Pierna, 88, French politician, deputy (1988–1997).
- El Risitas, 65, Spanish comedian, internet meme and actor (Torrente 3: El protector, Ratones coloraos), complications from vascular disease.
- Federico Salas, 70, Peruvian politician, prime minister (2000), COVID-19.
- Marian Simms, 69, Australian political scientist.
- Kesar Singh, 64, Indian politician, Uttar Pradesh MLA (since 2017), COVID-19.
- Liuwe Tamminga, 67, Dutch organist and harpsichordist.
- Chelato Uclés, 80, Honduran footballer (Atlético Español) and coach (Real España, national team), heart attack.
- Samisoni Viriviri, 67, Fijian rugby union coach.

=== 29 ===
- Riyaz Ahmad, 62, Indian politician, Uttar Pradesh MLA (1980–1985, 1990–1991, 2002–2017), COVID-19.
- Mongashti Amirian, 85, Iranian Olympic weightlifter (1960).
- Amris, 63, Indonesian general and politician, COVID-19.
- C. Aranganayagam, 90, Indian politician, Tamil Nadu MLA.
- Hans van Baalen, 60, Dutch politician, MP (1999–2009) and MEP (2009–2019), president of the ALDE Party (since 2015), cancer.
- Rajendrasingh Baghel, 75, Indian politician, Madhya Pradesh MLA (1985–1990, 1993–1998, 2003–2008), COVID-19.
- Mahinda Balasuriya, 67, Sri Lankan police officer, inspector general (2009–2012).
- Kunwar Bechain, 78, Indian poet, COVID-19.
- Martin Bookspan, 94, American music broadcaster (Live from Lincoln Center) and author.
- Hafid Bouazza, 51, Moroccan-Dutch writer, cirrhosis.
- Frank Brogan, 78, Scottish footballer (Celtic, Ipswich Town, Halifax Town).
- Anne Buydens, 102, German-born American philanthropist.
- R. S. G. Chelladurai, 84, Indian actor (Maari, Theri).
- Allan Cosio, 79, Filipino artist, COVID-19.
- Johnny Crawford, 75, American actor (The Rifleman, Village of the Giants, The Space Children) and singer, complications from Alzheimer's disease and COVID-19.
- Hassan Dardir, 82, Saudi Arabian actor.
- Mantfombi Dlamini, 68, Swazi royal, queen regent of the Zulu people (since 2021).
- André Evrard, 85, Swiss painter.
- Roger Fauteux, 97, Canadian artist.
- Michael W. Friedlander, 92, South African-born American physicist and skeptic.
- Pierce Fulton, 28, American disc jockey and record producer, suicide.
- José Francisco Gallardo Rodríguez, 74, Mexican army general and academic, COVID-19.
- Laxman Giluwa, 56, Indian politician, MP (2014–2019), COVID-19.
- Ronnie Govender, 86, South African playwright.
- Michael Greenwood, 86, English footballer (Bishop Auckland, national team).
- Terry Groom, 76, Australian politician, member of the South Australian House of Assembly (1977–1979, 1982–1993).
- Courtney Hall, 52, American football player (San Diego Chargers).
- Cate Haste, 75, English author and historian.
- Billie Hayes, 96, American actress (H.R. Pufnstuf, The Black Cauldron, Transformers: Rescue Bots).
- John Hinch, 73, British drummer (Judas Priest, Bakerloo).
- Kazimierz Kord, 90, Polish conductor.
- Pete Lammons, 77, American football player (New York Jets, Green Bay Packers), drowned.
- Libertad Leblanc, 83, Argentine actress (Harassed, La endemoniada, Deliciously Amoral).
- Michel Lejeune, 74, French politician, deputy (2002–2012) and mayor of Forges-les-Eaux (since 1995).
- Caleb Maduoma, 70, Nigerian Anglican prelate, bishop of Ideato (2004–2020) and archbishop of the Province of Owerri (2013–2020).
- Tony Markellis, 68, American bassist (Trey Anastasio Band).
- Willy Mckey, 40, Venezuelan poet and writer, suicide by jumping.
- Frank McRae, 80, American actor (*batteries not included, Licence to Kill) and football player (Chicago Bears), heart attack.
- Roy McWeeny, 96, English physicist and academic.
- Will Mecum, 48, American rock guitarist and songwriter (Karma to Burn, Year Long Disaster), fall.
- Filippo Mondelli, 26, Italian rower, world champion (2018), bone cancer.
- Kazuo Oka, 73, Japanese voice actor (Tsuki ga Kirei, Naruto, Romeo × Juliet).
- Panama Red, 76, American musician and songwriter.
- Andrew J. Reck, 93, American philosopher.
- Mary E. Rice, 94, American invertebrate zoologist.
- Onésimo Silveira, 86, Cape Verdean politician and writer, MP (2006–2011).
- Prince Muhammad bin Talal, 80, Jordanian royal.
- David B. Wake, 84, American herpetologist.
- Zhang Enhua, 48, Chinese footballer (Dalian Wanda, Grimsby Town, national team).
- Bogdan Žižić, 86, Croatian film director (The House, Don't Lean Out the Window, Early Snow in Munich) and screenwriter.
- Nell Znamierowski, 89, American textile artist.

=== 30 ===
- K. V. Anand, 54, Indian cinematographer (Thenmavin Kombath) and film director (Kana Kandaen, Anegan), cardiac arrest from COVID-19.
- Claudia Barrett, 91, American actress (A Life at Stake, The Happy Years).
- Aleksei Bespalikov, 73, Russian politician, Novosibirsk Oblast MLA (2005–2010) and senator (2010–2014).
- Eli Broad, 87, American philanthropist, art collector, and museum co-founder (The Broad).
- William Cain, 85, Manx lawyer, First Deemster (1998–2003).
- Kom Chuanchuen, 63, Thai actor (Heaven's Seven) and comedian, COVID-19.
- Hugh Coflin, 92, Canadian ice hockey player (Chicago Blackhawks).
- Dick Davis, 83, American football player (Dallas Texans).
- Shragee Gestetner, 33, Canadian-American Hasidic singer, Meron crowd crush.
- Kęstutis Glaveckas, 72, Lithuanian politician, deputy (2000–2012).
- Flemming Hansen, 81, Danish politician, minister of transport (2001–2007) and Nordic cooperation (2002–2005).
- Chris Heintz, 82, French-Canadian aeronautical engineer.
- John Dee Holeman, 92, American Piedmont blues guitarist, singer and songwriter.
- Khelan Ram Jangde, 74, Indian politician, MP (1984–1989, 1991–1996), cardiac arrest.
- Mišo Juzmeski, 55, Macedonian writer.
- Neltje Doubleday Kings, 86, American artist and philanthropist.
- Jagdish Lad, 34, Indian bodybuilder, COVID-19.
- Mark Lancaster, 82, English artist and set designer.
- Ling How Doong, 85, Singaporean politician, MP (1991–1997) and leader of the opposition (1993–1996).
- Anthony Payne, 84, English composer (Symphony No. 3).
- Azad Rahimov, 56, Azerbaijani politician, minister of youth and sports (since 2006).
- Ray Reyes, 51, Puerto Rican singer (Menudo, El Reencuentro), heart attack.
- Rohit Sardana, 41, Indian journalist (Zee News, Aaj Tak), complications from COVID-19.
- Sanjay Kumar Seth, 63, Indian judge, chief justice of the Madhya Pradesh High Court (2018–2019), COVID-19.
- Soli Sorabjee, 91, Indian jurist, attorney general (1989–1990, 1998–2004), COVID-19.
- Takashi Tachibana, 80, Japanese journalist, acute coronary syndrome.
- Chandro Tomar, 89, Indian sharpshooter, COVID-19.
- Jevgeni Tomberg, 72, Estonian politician, MP (1999–2003), COVID-19.
- Pio Vittorio Vigo, 85, Italian Roman Catholic prelate, archbishop of Monreale (1997–2002) and Acireale (2002–2011), COVID-19.
- Md Yusnan Yusof, 52, Malaysian politician, Kelantan MLA (since 2013).
