= Pedro Soto =

Pedro Soto is the name of:

- Pedro Soto (footballer), Mexican footballer
- Pedro Soto (politician), Spanish politician

== See also ==
- Pedro Blanco Soto, Bolivian general and politician
