= Yvan Daumas =

French painter (1943–2021)

- Born: 1943; Marseille, France
- Died: 13 April 2021 (aged 77–78)
- Occupation: Painter

Yvan Daumas (1943 – 13 April 2021) was a French expressionist painter.

== Biography ==
Daumas grew up in Carry-le-Rouet and studied at the École des beaux-arts de Marseille, where he was a student of François Bret. He later taught at the same school. In 1990, he directed a short film as part of his series "portrait sans paroles". In 1997, he illustrated the book Passant obstiné, written by Yves Broussard.

Yvan Daumas died on 13 April 2021.
