= Adam Kolton =

American environmentalist

- Born: Adam Michael Kolton; February 20, 1968; Chicago, Illinois, U.S.
- Died: April 26, 2021 (aged 53)
- Education: University of Wisconsin
- Occupation: Environmentalist
- Spouse: Laura Hopkins Geer (m. 2001)

Adam Michael Kolton (February 20, 1968 – April 26, 2021) was an American environmentalist. He was known for defending the Arctic National Wildlife Refuge against oil and gas drilling.

== Life and career ==
Kolton was born in Chicago. He attended the University of Wisconsin, earning his bachelor's degree in history and journalism in 1990.

Kolton was executive director of the Alaska Wilderness League from 2017 to 2021.

Kolton died on April 26, 2022, at the age of 53.
