= Bob Herman (sociologist) =

American urban sociologist (1928–2021)

- Born: Robert Dunton Herman; 1928; Champaign, Illinois, U.S.
- Died: April 9, 2021 (aged 92); Claremont, California, U.S.

Academic background
- Education: Pomona College (BA); University of Wisconsin–Madison (PhD)

Academic work
- Discipline: Sociology
- Sub-discipline: Urban sociology
- Institutions: Iowa State University; Pomona College

Robert Dunton Herman (1928 – April 9, 2021) was an American urban sociologist. He taught at Pomona College for four decades, and became known as an advocate for downtown Los Angeles.

== Early life and education ==
Herman was born in Champaign, Illinois, and raised in Hillsdale, Michigan. During his childhood, he lived in Tucson, Arizona, and Redlands, California. He earned a Bachelor of Arts degree in sociology from Pomona College in 1951 and a PhD in sociology from the University of Wisconsin–Madison.

== Career ==
Herman served as an electrical specialist in the United States Navy for two years. After earning his PhD, Herman taught at Iowa State University. He returned to Claremont, California, in 1960 and began teaching at Pomona College. He remained at the school for several decades and also served a chair of the Pomona College Sociology Department.
