= Marshall Gelfand =

American music entrepreneur (1927–2021)

Marshall Gelfand (December 14, 1927 - April 1, 2021) was an American music entrepreneur and founder of an entertainment business management and accounting firm.

Gelfand served in the U.S. Navy in World War II. Following the war, he earned a B.A. in accounting from Syracuse University School of Management in 1950. He was a member of Sigma Alpha Mu. He served again in the Korean War, and then earned a law degree from the New York University School of Law in 1956.

His firm initially was called Gelfand, MacNow, Rennert and Feldman. Later, the accounting firm reduced its name to Gelfand, Rennert & Feldman, which had offices in New York, Los Angeles, Nashville and London, England. He was the managing partner with his partner Martin Feldman, who died in April 2020. Both were the primary accountants and business managers to many well-known musicians (such as Bob Dylan, Neil Diamond, Peter, Paul and Mary, and others). Gelfand also represented actors and writers, such as Debra Winger and Herman Wouk. Feldman was one of the first individual accountants to accompany world tours of international artists starting in the early 1970's, a field that became referred to as a tour accountant. Gelfand was honored by the 64th Annual Grammy Awards for his contributions.
