= Irondi Pugliesi =

Brazilian politician (1947–2021)

Irondi Mantovani Pugliesi (3 August 1947 – 12 April 2021) was a Brazilian politician and member of the Democratic Movement Party.

== Biography ==
She served as a member of the Legislative Assembly of Paraná from 1995 to 1999 and 1983–1991.

She died on 12 April 2021, from COVID-19 in Arapongas during the COVID-19 pandemic in Brazil.
