= Ñito =

Spanish footballer (1939–2021)

Personal information
- Full name: Cipriano Antonio González Rivero
- Date of birth: 16 September 1939
- Place of birth: Santa Cruz de Tenerife, Spain
- Date of death: 8 April 2021 (aged 81)
- Place of death: Santa Cruz de Tenerife, Spain
- Height: 1.84 m (6 ft 0 in)
- Position: Goalkeeper

Senior career*
Years	Team	Apps	(Gls)
1959–1963	Tenerife	65	(0)
1963–1966	Valencia	21	(0)
1966–1973	Granada	155	(0)
1973–1974	Linares	2	(0)
1974–1975	Real Murcia	13	(0)
Total		256	(0)
- * Club domestic league appearances and goals

Cipriano Antonio González Rivero, known as Ñito (16 September 1939 – 8 April 2021) was a Spanish professional footballer who played as a goalkeeper.

== Career ==
Born in Santa Cruz de Tenerife, Ñito played for Tenerife, Valencia, Granada, Linares and Real Murcia.
