= Gérard Montassier =

French essayist and government official (1937–2021)

- Born: 5 June 1937; Bône, French Algeria
- Died: 19 April 2021 (aged 83)
- Occupations: Essayist; Government Official

Gérard Montassier (5 June 1937 – 19 April 2021) was an Algerian-born French essayist and government official.

== Biography ==
Born in modern-day Annaba, Algeria in 1937, Montassier earned a degree from Sciences Po in 1960 and an agrégation in classical literature from the École nationale d'administration (ENA) in 1967.

Montassier first became a teacher at the Lycée de Saint-Quentin before becoming a secretary at the Ministry of Foreign Affairs. He then became Secretary General of the Fonds d'intervention culturel and worked for the Ministry of Culture under Jacques Duhamel and Michel Guy. He was appointed Minister Plenipotentiary of the Ministry in 1990.

Montassier was a member of the Union for French Democracy (UDF) and led its division in Charente from 1977 to 1981. He divorced and subsequently remarried Valérie-Anne Giscard d'Estaing, who he met at the Ministry of Culture. In 1979, he ran in the Canton of Segonzac for the UDF, but was unsuccessful. In 1981, his candidacy for the National Assembly was invalidated due to late registration. A pro-European, he founded the Fondation internationale pour une histoire de la civilisation européenne and became its president in 1994. In 2013, he founded the Confrérie du cognac.

Gérard Montassier died on 19 April 2021 at the age of 83.

== Books ==
- Le Fait culturel (1980)
- Le 14 juillet 1989 (1982)
- Les Premiers Feux du plaisir : roman (1989)
- Les Nouveaux Conquérants : la France réconciliée (1989)
- L'Europe, cette inconnue (2007)
- Mazarin : l'étranger qui a fait la France (2015)
