= Rashid Sweissat =

Jordanian boxer (2002–2021)

Rashid Seissat
Personal information
- National team: Jordanian National Boxing Team
- Citizenship: Jordan
- Born: 18 May 2002
- Died: 27 April 2021 (aged 18)
- Resting place: Fuheis
- Occupation: Boxer

Rashid Sweissat (18 May 2002 – 26 April 2021) was a Jordanian boxer, and a member in the national boxing team for the youth category.

== Death ==
He died in the evening of 26 April 2021, as a result of an injury he suffered during his fight on 16 April 2021 during the World Youth Championships, which were held in the Polish city of Kielce.

He was later buried in his hometown Fuheis. The International Boxing Federation (AIBA) mourned his death by an official statement.

Sweissat was knocked out in front Estonian boxer Anton Vinogradov in the 81-kilogram fight, and necessitated his admission to the hospital for urgent surgery.
