= Leokadiya Drobizheva =

Soviet sociologist (1933–2021)

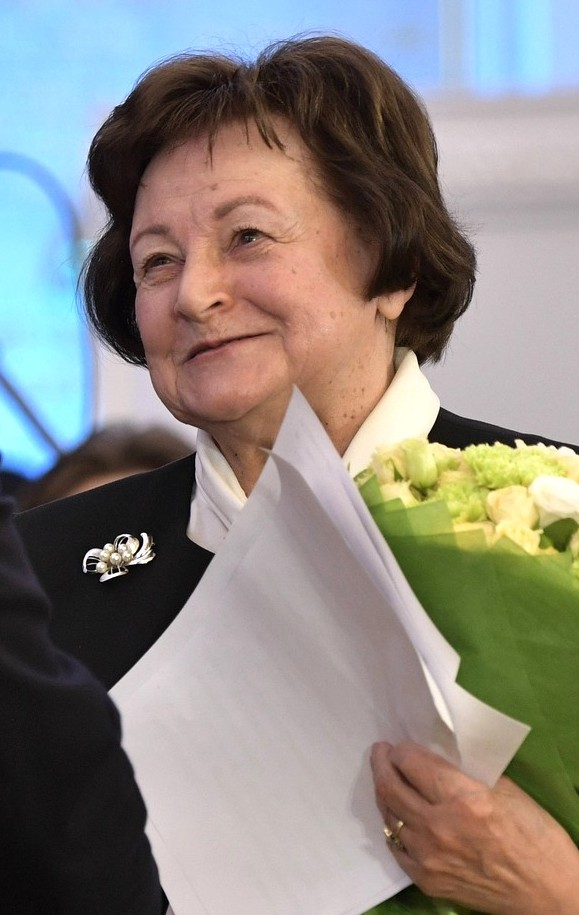
Leokadiya Drobizheva

Leokadiya Mikhailovna Drobizheva (Russian: Леокáдия Михáйловна Дро́бижева) (13 January 1933 – 11 April 2021) was a Russian sociologist. She was made an Honored Scientist of the Russian Federation in 1999, Laureate of the Prize of the President of the Russian Federation for Contribution to Strengthening the Unity of the Russian Nation (2019), and Honorary Doctor of the Institute of Sociology of the Russian Academy of Sciences.
