= Midwin Charles =

American attorney and TV personality (1973–2021)

- Born: July 17, 1973; Brooklyn, New York, United States
- Died: April 6, 2021 (aged 47)
- Occupations: Lawyer, television reporter
- Employer(s): CNN, MSNBC, Midwin Charles & Associates, LLC
- Known for: Television personality, lawyer

Midwin Charles (July 17, 1973 – April 6, 2021) was a Haitian-American defense attorney.

== Early life ==
Charles was born on July 17, 1973, in Brooklyn, New York, where she was raised, before becoming a graduate of Syracuse University with a bachelor's degree in African American Studies, moving on to earn a Juris Doctor degree at the American University Washington College of Law.

== Career ==
Charles was the founder of the Midwin Charles & Associates LLC law firm. She was prominent as a television personality, being the legal analyst for American television channels CNN and MSNBC. She also commented on Bloomberg TV, HLN and TV One, and her topics included such other broad subjects as pop culture and politics.

== Death ==
Charles died on April 6, 2021, her family announced on Twitter.
