= José Luis Álvarez de Castro =

Spanish politician (1918–2021)

José Luis Álvarez de Castro (December 1918 – 26 April 2021) was a Spanish politician.

He was born in 1918 in Granada, a city in Andalusia, to his parents Juan Álvarez Castilla and Mercedez De Castro Beltrán. In 1969 he became member of the Francoist Courts as he was president of the province of Cuenca Deputation, succeeding in both offices Rafael Mombiedro de la Torre. He held the office until 1971, when Tagus-Segura Water Transfer was approved by the Court, project to which he vehemently opposed. A street in Cuenca is named after him.

Álvarez de Castro died on 26 April 2021 at the age of 102.
