= Ron Herbert =

English rugby league footballer (1933–2021)

Personal information
- Full name: Ronald Herbert
- Born: 1933
- Died: 2 April 2021 (aged 87–88)

Playing information
- Position: Centre
Club
Years	Team	Pld	T	G	FG	P
1951–58	Warrington	41	20	0	0	60
- As of 26 Jul 2021

Ron Herbert (1933 – 2 April 2021) was an English professional rugby league footballer who played for the Warrington Wolves.

He made 41 appearances and scored 20 tries. On debut he was the youngest ever player for the Wolves. He came to the attention of the Wolves because of his blistering speed and spent 8 seasons with the club, his appearances were limited by recurrent shoulder injuries.

== See also ==
- List of Warrington Wolves players
