= Hubert Gerbeau =

French historian and writer (1937–2021)

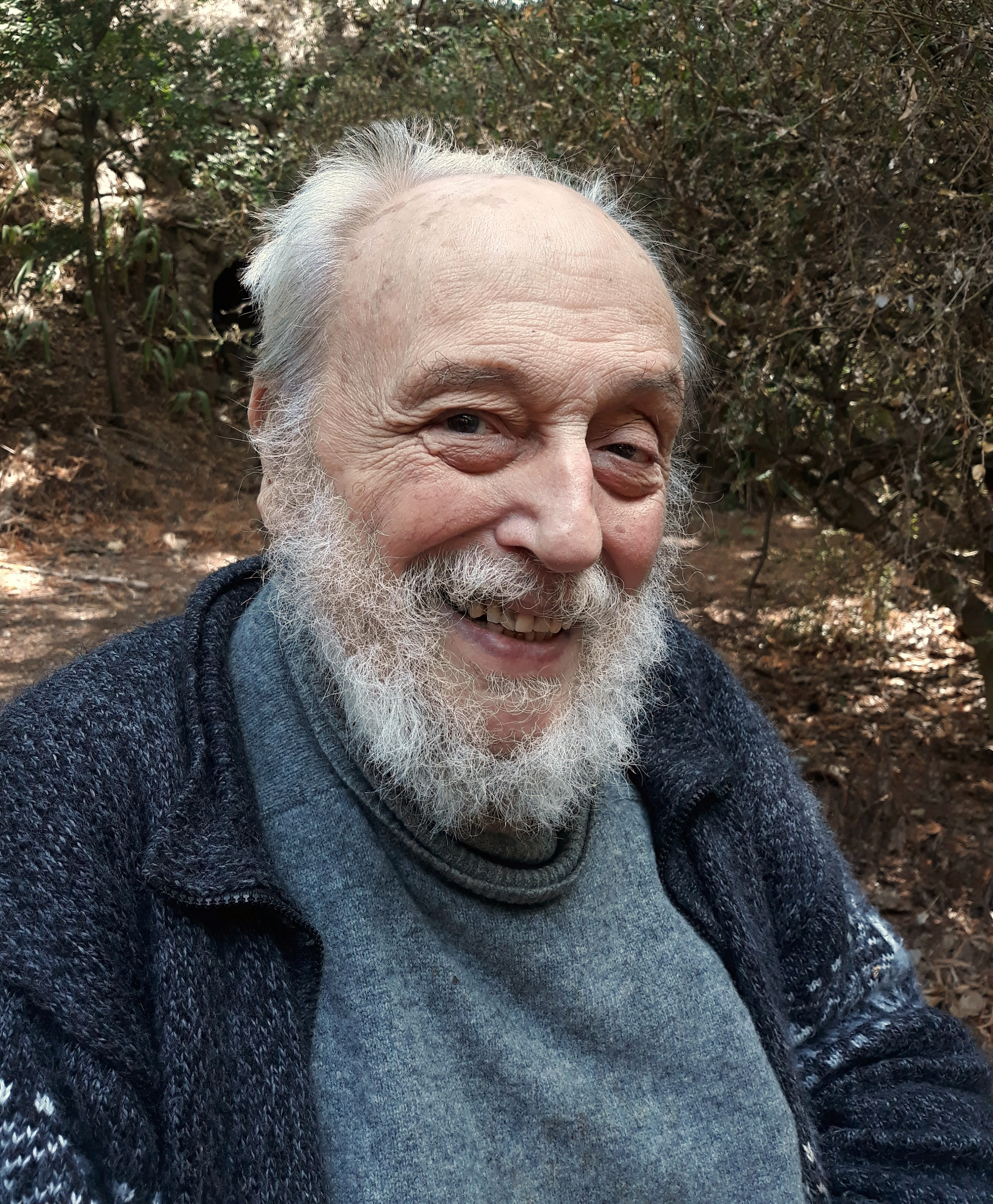
- Born: 17 January 1937; Marseille, France
- Died: 3 April 2021 (aged 84)
- Occupations: Historian; Writer

Hubert Gerbeau (17 January 1937 – 3 April 2021) was a French historian and writer. He travelled to several places in the French-speaking world, including Réunion. A graduate of the University of Provence, he wrote several essays and novels on themes such as slavery.

== Distinctions ==
- Knight of the Legion of Honour

== Works ==
=== Doctoral Thesis ===
- L'esclavage et son ombre : l'île de Bourbon aux XIXe et XXe siècles, thèse de doctorat d'Etat (2005)

=== Essays ===
- Martin Luther King (1968)
- Les esclaves noirs : pour une histoire du silence (1970)
- Les esclaves noirs : pour une histoire du silence (2013)
- Outre-terre, outre-mer : cultures, colonialisme, impérialismes : mélanges pour Jacques Weber (2019)

=== Novels ===
- Noc (2004)
- Lia : d'un paradis à l'autre (2006)
- La Négresse de paradis (2008)
