= Hans-Karl von Unger =

German politician (1930–2021)

Member of the Landtag of North Rhine-Westphalia
- In office 1980–1995

Personal details
- Born: 5 December 1930 Wunstorf, Germany
- Died: 17 April 2021 (aged 90)
- Party: CDU

Hans-Karl von Unger (5 December 1930 – 17 April 2021) was a German politician.

== Biography ==
After he completed his secondary studies, von Unger studied mechanical engineering at the University of Hanover from 1951 to 1957. After graduation, he worked for Friedrich Krupp AG. He served as director general of a subsidiary from 1980 to 1992 and subsequently became an independent consultant.

In 1963, von Unger joined the Christian Democratic Union of Germany (CDU) and served as a Municipal Councilor for Duisburg from 1979 to 1990. From 1980 to 1995, he was a member of the Landtag of North Rhine-Westphalia for the CDU.

Hans-Karl von Unger died on 17 April 2021 at the age of 90.

== Distinctions ==
- Knight of the Order of Saint John
