= Pedro Soares Martínez =

Portuguese politician (1925–2021)

Pedro Mário Soares Martínez

Portuguese Minister of Health
- In office 1962–1963

Personal details
- Born: 21 November 1925 Lisbon, First Portuguese Republic
- Died: 12 April 2021 (aged 95) Lisbon, Portugal
- Party: National Union

Pedro Mário Soares Martínez (21 November 1925 – 12 April 2021) was a Portuguese politician, academic, and lawyer. He served as Minister of Health from 1962 to 1963 under the government of António de Oliveira Salazar.
