= Lefteris Mytilineos =

Greek singer (1946–2021)

Lefteris Mytilineos Λευτέρης Μυτιληναίος
- Born: Eleutherios Mytilinidis; Greek: Ελευθέριος Μυτιληνίδης; 24 April 1946; Athens, Greece
- Died: 5 April 2021 (aged 74) Corinth, Greece
- Genres: Laïko
- Occupation: Musician
- Instrument: vocals
- Years active: 1970 - 2021

Lefteris Mytilineos (Greek: Λευτέρης Μυτιληναίος; 24 April 1946 – 5 April 2021) was a Greek singer. He released around 20 full-length studio albums, on labels such as Columbia Records, CBS Records International, EMI and others.

Mytilineos died from COVID-19 in Corinth on 5 April 2021, during the COVID-19 pandemic in Greece. He was 74, 19 days before his 75th birthday.

== Discography ==
He released the following albums:

- "Λευτέρης Μυτιληναίος" (Columbia, 1971)
- "Νο 2" (EMI (re-release), 1974)
- "Αυταπάτες" (Columbia, 1975, split album)
- "Νο 3" (Columbia, 1975)
- "Ένα Δάκρυ.." (Columbia, 1977)
- "Τα Φώτα Χαμηλώστε" (CBS, 1979)
- "Πού Νάσαι" (CBS, 1980)
- "Θά Σέ Λησμονήσω" (CBS, 1981)
- "Στάσου Μια Στιγμή" (CBS, 1983)
- "Λίγο Πριν Ξημερώσει" (CBS, 1984)
- "Θα Περιμένω" (CBS, 1985)
- "Ότι Έχω Και Δεν Έχω" (CBS, 1986)
- "Αντικανονικά... Σ' Αγαπώ" (Pan-Vox, 1987)
- "Λαικό Ξεφάντωμα" (Pan-Vox, 1988, split album)
- "Καμμιά Δεν Σου Μοιάζει" (EMI, 1988)
- "Για Προδομένους" (EMI, 1990)
- "Και Το Ρωτάς" (Music Box International, 1994)
- "Μονάχα Δυο Βραδιές" (Music Box International, 1996)
- "Η Δική Μου Υπογραφή" (Legend Recordings, 2002)
