= Zurab Rtveliashvili =

Georgian poet and multi-media performer (1967–2021)

Zurab Rtveliashvili (Georgian: ზურაბ რთველიაშვილი; 16 October 1967 – 20 April 2021) was a Georgian poet and multi-media performer. Rtveliashvili was born in Karaganda, Kazakhstan. He is featured in the 2009 documentary film At the Top of My Voice.

In 2010, Rtveliashvili was offered asylum in Stockholm, Sweden, from persecution in his native Georgia.

== Death ==
Rtveliashvili died in Tbilisi after a battle with cancer on 20 April 2021.

== Publications ==
- I-reqtsia (1997)
- Apokrifi (2001)
- Anarqi (2006)
