= José Carlos Schiavinato =

Brazilian politician (1954–2021)

Member of the Chamber of Deputies
- In office 1 February 2015 – 13 April 2021
- Constituency: Paraná

Mayor of Toledo
- In office 1 January 2005 – 1 January 2013

Personal details
- Born: 12 September 1954 Iguaraçu, Fourth Brazilian Republic
- Died: 13 April 2021 (aged 66) Brasília, Brazil
- Political party: PP

José Carlos Schiavinato (12 September 1954 – 13 April 2021) was a Brazilian politician and engineer.

== Biography ==
A member of the Progressistas, he served as Mayor of Toledo from 2005 to 2013. He was also a Member of the Chamber of Deputies for Paraná from 2015 until his death from COVID-19 in Brasília on 13 April 2021, at the age of 66.
