= John W. Nyquist =

United States Navy admiral (1933–2021)

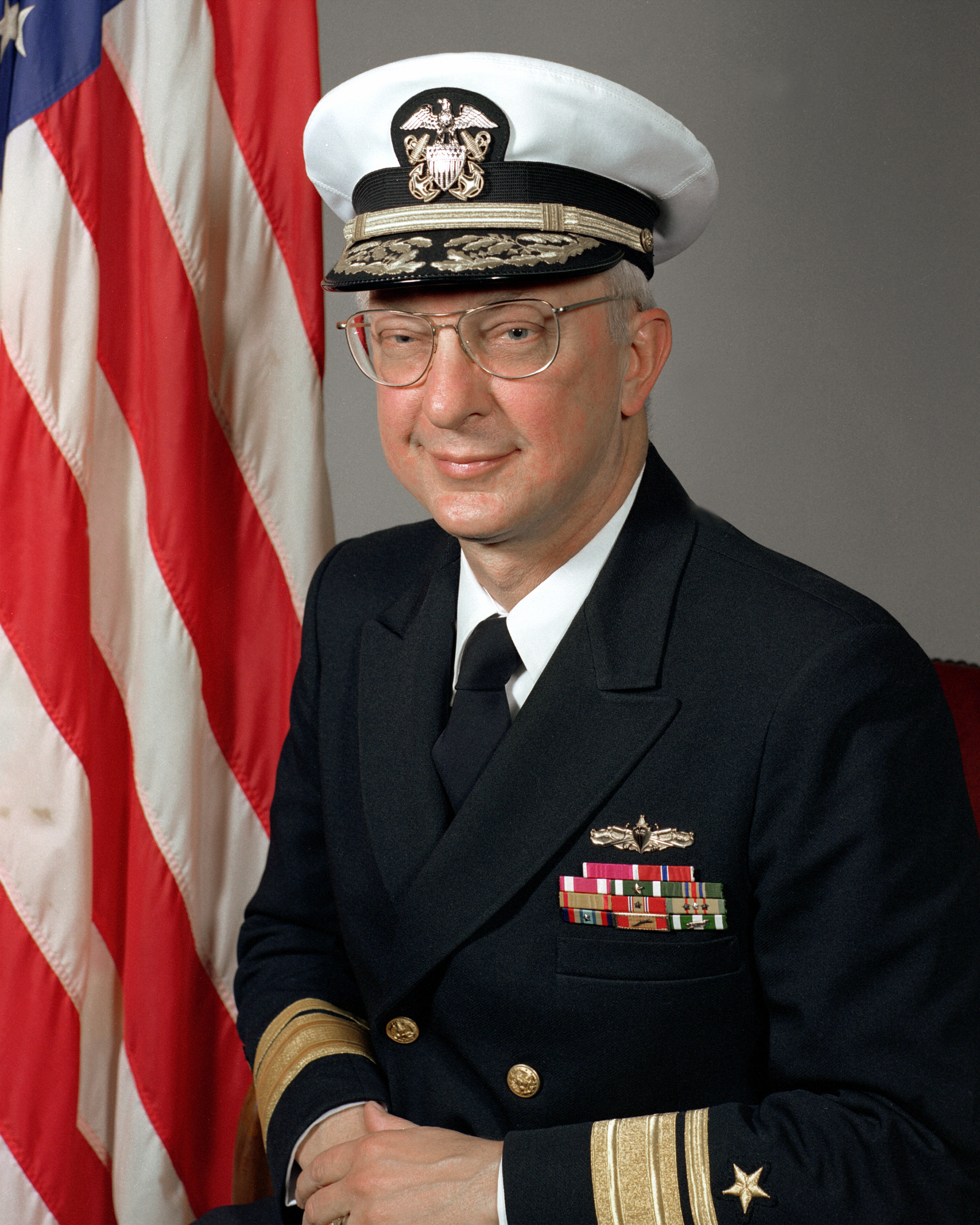
- Nyquist pictured as rear admiral in 1981
- Born: February 11, 1933; San Diego, California, U.S.
- Died: April 9, 2021 (aged 88); Coronado, California, U.S.
- Military career
- Allegiance: United States
- Branch: United States Navy
- Service years: c.1955–1991
- Rank: Vice admiral
- Unit: USS Prime (MSO-466) Executive Officer
- Commands: Assistant Chief of Naval Operations, Surface Warfare, others in text

John Walfrid Nyquist (February 11, 1933 – April 9, 2021) was a vice admiral in the United States Navy. He was born in San Diego, California, the son of rear admiral Nels Walfrid Nyquist and Irma Beske. He attended the University of Minnesota and United States Naval Academy, graduating from the latter in 1955. He was a former commander of Destroyer Squadron 26, Destroyer Squadron 20, USS Semmes (DDG-18) and Cruiser-Destroyer Group Five. He also worked in the Office of the Chief of Naval Operations as Assistant Deputy Chief of Naval Operations, Surface Warfare, and Assistant Chief of Naval Operations, Surface Warfare. He retired in 1991. His awards include the Distinguished Service Medal, the Legion of Merit, the Bronze Star, the Meritorious Service Medal, the Navy Commendation Medal, two Meritorious Unit Commendations. In retirement he worked for Trex Enterprises Corporation, and was a defense consultant. He resided in Coronado, California, with his wife Penelope Ann Lyon until his death in 2021 at the age of 88.
