= Michel Quévit =

Belgian writer and activist (1939–2021)

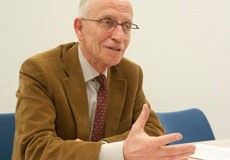
- Quévit in 2016
- Born: 11 October 1939; Rebecq, Belgium
- Died: 10 April 2021 (aged 81)
- Occupations: Writer; Activist

Michel Quévit (11 October 1939 – 10 April 2021) was a Belgian writer, political scientist, sociologist, and activist of the Walloon Movement. He was known to closely follow Wallonia and its economy. He was the author of the book Les causes du déclin wallon.

== Distinctions ==
- Officer of Mérite wallon (2012)

== Publications ==
- Les causes du déclin wallon (1978)
- La Wallonie, l'indispensable autonomie (1982)
- Impact de 1992 : Les Régions de Tradition Industrielle (1991)
- Regional Development trajectories and the attainment of the internal market (1991)
- Politique d'innovation au niveau local (1992)
- Réseaux d'innovation et milieux innovateurs : un pari pour le développement régional (1993)
- Transnational corporation and European Regional restructuring (1994)
- Flandre - Wallonie Quelle solidarité ? : De la création de l’État belge à l’Europe des Régions (2010)
