= Robert Seibert =

American political scientist (1941–2021)

Robert F. Seibert (1941 – April 16, 2021) was a Professor Emeritus of Political Science at Knox College in Galesburg, Illinois and a longtime political commentator.

== Early life and education ==
A native of a small Illinois town, Seibert graduated from Knox with an undergraduate degree in 1963 and then received his Ph.D. from Tulane University in 1969. He began teaching at Knox in 1967.

== Professional career ==
Seibert taught comparative politics, politics of the Middle East, and political communication. Together with Roy Andersen and Jon Wagner, Seibert was the coauthor of Politics and Change in the Middle East, a text on comparative politics in the Middle East.

Seibert also appeared as a commentator on National Public Radio, the BBC, the Canadian Broadcasting Company and Voice of America.

Seibert retired from Knox College in 2013.

== Death ==
Seibert died on April 16, 2021, in Chicago.
