= Florence Piron =

Canadian anthropologist and ethicist (1966–2021)

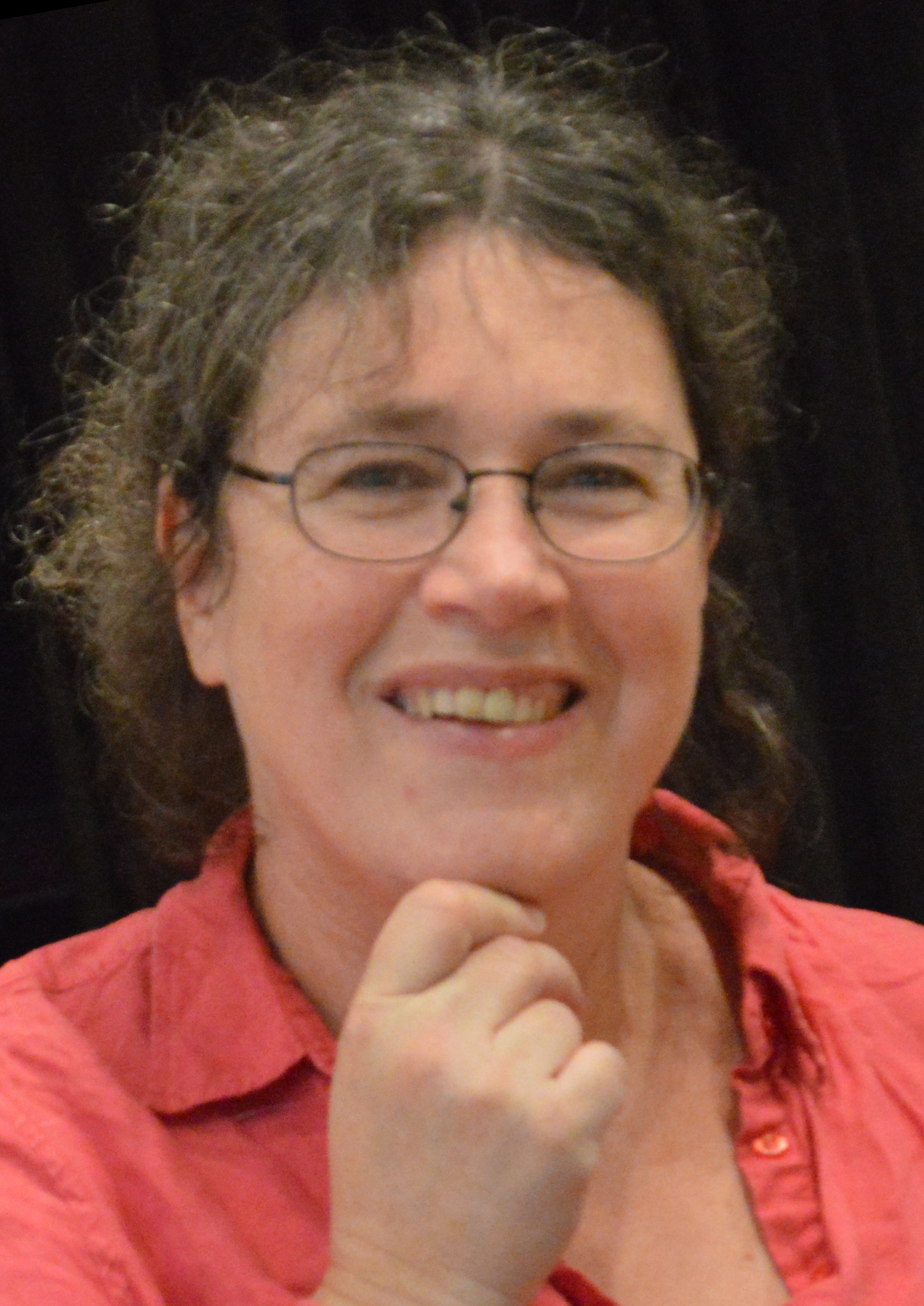
- Piron in 2016
- Born: 1966
- Died: 26 April 2021 (aged 54)
- Occupations: Anthropologist and ethicist

Florence Piron (1966 – 26 April 2021) was a French-born Canadian anthropologist and ethicist. She was full professor in the Department of Communication and Information at Laval University. She also acted as a Knight of the International Order of Academic Palms of CAMES (OIPA-CAMES). Her focus was on open access to knowledge and to enhance the scientific "heritage" of places like Africa and Haiti.

Piron died on 26 April 2021 at the age of 54.
