= Chandranath Mishra Amar =

Indian writer (1925–2021)

Chandranath Mishra Amar (2 March 1925 – 1 April 2021) was a Maithili writer and poet. He was the recipient of the Sahitya Akademi award for his 1982 work Maithili Patrakaritak Itahas. He also won the prestigious Sahitya Akademi Fellowship for the year 2010.

== Honours and awards ==
- Founder Secretary, Navratna Gosthi, Darbhanga (1943)
- General Secretary, All India Maithili Sahitya Parishad (1957)
- Language Director and Actor in First Maithili film Kanyadan directed by Phani Majumdar (1964)
- Member, Senate, KSDS University, Darbhanga (1982)
- Sahitya Akademi Award for Maithili Patrakaritak Itihas (1983)
- Member, Maithili Language Advisory Board, Sahitya Akademi, New Delhi (1983)
- Member, Executive Committee, Maithili Academy Patna (1988)
- Member, Programme Advisory Committee, All India Radio, Darbhanga (1993)
- Sahitya Akademi Translation Award for Parashuramak Bichhal Berayal Katha (1998)
- Convenor, Maithili Advisory Board Sahitya Akademi, New Delhi (2003)
- Sahitya Akademi Fellowship (2010)

== List of works ==
Poetry

- Gudgudi (1946)
- Yugachakra (1952)
- Ritupriya (1963)
- Unta Pal (1972)
- Asha-Disha (1975)
- Thahi-Pathahi (2001)

Novel, Short-Story & Criticism

- Veer Kanya (1950)
- Bidagari (1963)
- Jasamadhi (1972)
- M. M. Muralidhar Jha (1980)
- Kashikant Mishra 'Madhup'(1994)
- Dinanath Pathak Bandhu (1994)
- Zero Power (2006)

One-Act Play

- Samadhan (1995)
- Khajwa Topi (2005)

Memoir

- Kanyadan Filmak: Nepathya Katha (2003)

Miscellaneous

- Trifla (1948)
- Maithili Patrikaritak Itihas (1981)
- Swatantra Swar (1994)
- Parashuramak Bichhal Berayal Katha (1995)
- Maithili Sahitya Parishadak Itihas (1995)
- Maithili Mahasabhak Itihas (1995)

Translation

- Vidyapati Sukti Taranginee
- Bankim Chandra Chatterjee
- H. N. Apte

Editing

- Lok Sahitya (Research Papers)(2006)
- Maithili Ragmanch (Research Papers)(2007)
- Jagle Rahbai (Poetry) (2007)
- Labani Parak Deep (Poetry)
- Sandhi Samas (Short Story)
- Katha Kislay (2007)
