= Gilbert Clain =

Réunionese sculptor (1941–2021)

- Born: 17 August 1941; Saint-Louis, Réunion, France
- Died: 21 April 2021 (aged 79); Îlet Furcy, Réunion, France
- Occupation: Sculptor

Gilbert Clain (17 August 1941 – 21 April 2021) was a Réunionese sculptor.

== Biography ==
Clain was originally a planter of sugar cane before opening an art gallery in Îlet Furcy. He became one of the most famous sculptors in Réunion, primarily working with wood, basalt, and coral. Today, his works can be found in the Musée Léon-Dierx, the Fonds régional d'art contemporain de la Réunion, and the Musée de Saint-Pierre.

Gilbert Clain died in Îlet Furcy on 21 April 2021 at the age of 79.
