= Heinze Bakker =

Dutch sports journalist (1942–2021)

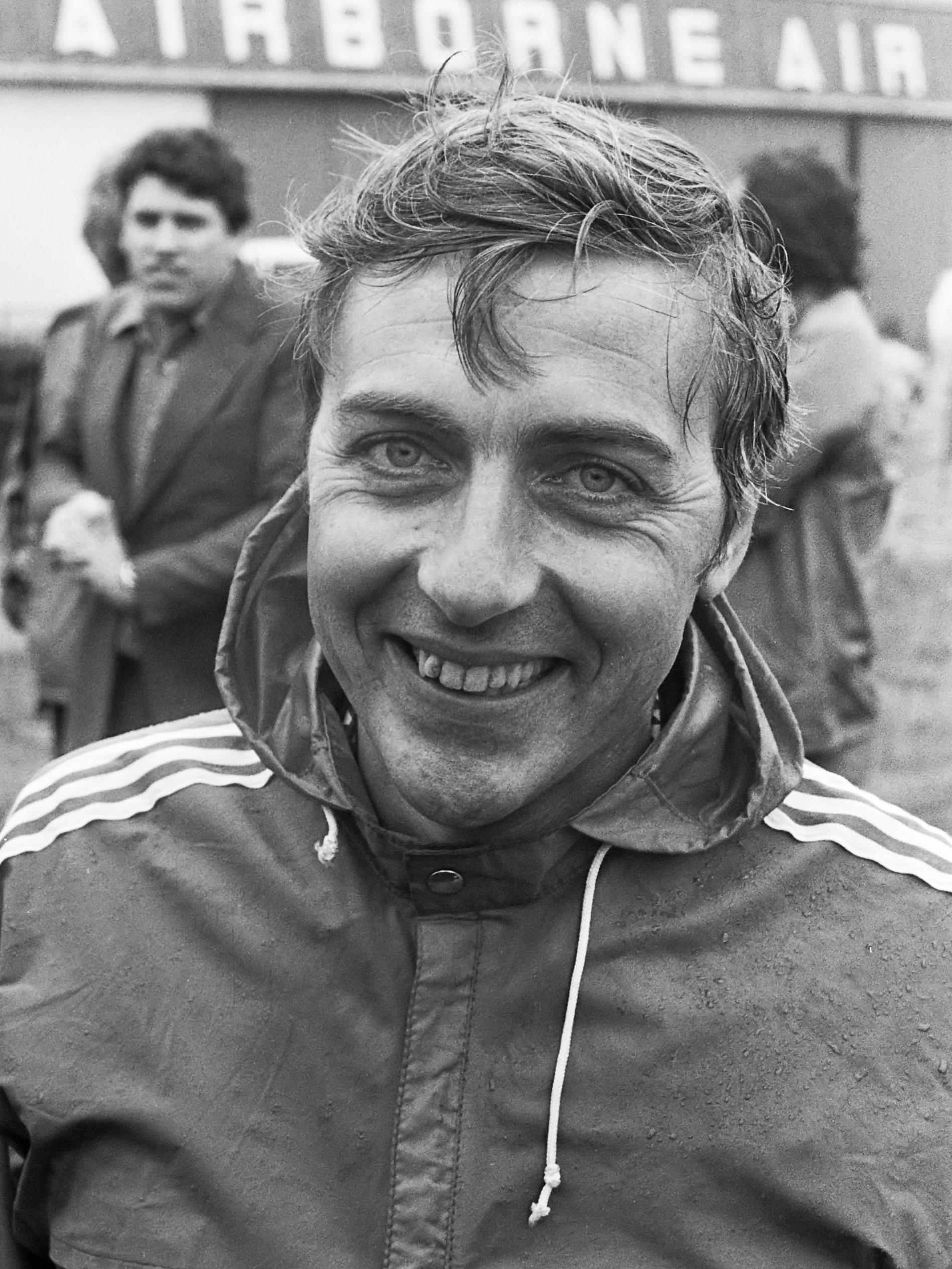
- Bakker in June 1978
- Born: 2 March 1942; Heerenveen, Friesland, Netherlands
- Died: 16 April 2021 (aged 79)

Heinze Bakker (2 March 1942 – 16 April 2021) was a Dutch sports journalist.
