= Qabdesh Zhumadilov =

Kazakh writer (1936–2021)

- Қабдеш Жұмаділов
- Born: April 24, 1936; Xinjiang Province, Republic of China
- Died: April 5, 2021 (aged 84); Almaty, Kazakhstan
- Citizenship: Republic of China, Soviet Union, Kazakhstan
- Occupations: Writer, politician

Qabdesh Zhumadilov (Kazakh: Қабдеш Жұмаділов, Qabdeş Jūmadılov; Russian: Кабдеш Жумадилов) (25 April 1936 – 5 April 2021) was a Kazakh author and national writer of Kazakhstan. He was born in Xinjiang.

Zhumadilov died on April 5, 2021, at the age of 84 from COVID-19 pandemic.

== Works ==
- Соңғы көш, Almaty: "Jazushy", 1998.
- Ata Meken, Almaty : Zhalyn, 1985.
- Taghdar, Almaty: "Jazushy", 1988.
