= Leïla Bahria =

Tunisian politician and judge (died 2021)

Secretary of State to the Tunisian Minister of Foreign Affairs
- In office 13 March 2013 – 29 January 2014
- Preceded by: Abdallah Triki
- Succeeded by: position abolished

Personal details
- Died: 20 April 2021
- Party: Independent

Leïla Bahira (died 20 April 2021) was a Tunisian politician and judge. She served as Secretary of State to Tunisian Minister of Foreign Affairs Othman Jerandi, overseeing African and Arab affairs from 2013 to 2014.
