= Ulrike Gauss =

German art historian (1941–2021)

- Born: 5 November 1941; Tübingen, Germany
- Died: 5 April 2021 (aged 79)
- Occupation: Art historian

Ulrike Gauss (5 November 1941 – 5 April 2021) was a German art historian.

Gauss is seen as one of the most renowned German art historians of her era. She became professor. She won the Schillerpreis der Stadt Marbach am Neckar in 1997.

Gauss died on 5 April 2021, aged 79.
