= Victor Garber (politician) =

American politician (1919–2021)

Member of the Wyoming House of Representatives
- In office 1959–1965
- In office 1979–1981

Personal details
- Born: September 14, 1919 Big Horn, Wyoming, U.S.
- Died: April 7, 2021 (aged 101) Big Horn, Wyoming, U.S.
- Party: Republican (1979–1981)
- Other political affiliations: Democratic (1959–1965)
- Spouse: Phyllis Miller (m. 1943; died 2001)
- Children: 4
- Education: Santa Paula High School; University of Wyoming
- Occupation: Agri-business

Victor Garber (September 14, 1919 – April 7, 2021) was an American politician in the state of Wyoming. He served in the Wyoming House of Representatives as a member of the Republican and Democratic parties. He attended the University of Wyoming and was a businessman in the agriculture industry. Garber turned 100 in September 2019 and died in April 2021 at the age of 101.
