= Umberto Battist =

French politician (1939–2021)

Member of the French National Assembly
- In office 12 June 1988 – 1 April 1993
- Constituency: Nord's 23rd constituency
- In office 21 June 1981 – 1 April 1986
- Constituency: Nord's 22nd constituency

Personal details
- Born: 6 September 1939
- Died: 16 April 2021 (aged 81)
- Party: PS

Umberto Battist (6 September 1939 – 16 April 2021) was a French politician. A member of the Socialist Party, he served on the National Assembly from 1981 to 1986 and again from 1988 to 1993.
