= Marianne Lienau =

German presenter, radio journalist, and contributing editor (1935–2021)

- fair use image from "WDR / Richter"
- Born: 19 December 1935; Königsberg
- Died: 24 April 2021 (aged 85)
- Occupations: presenter, radio journalist and contributing editor

Marianne Lienau (19 December 1935 – 24 April 2021) was a German presenter, radio journalist and contributing editor.

== Life ==
Lienau was born in 1935 and she is known for the WDR 3 radio series Kritisches Tagebuch (Critical Diary), which she and Hanno Reuther founded on 3 April 1967. She moderated the programme for many years. The programme ran from for 35 years from 1967 to 2003.

Lienau was also involved in the WDR series Neugier genügt. From 1989 to 1994 she moved to Mario Nordio in Rome as a radio correspondent for WDR and NDR. At her own request, she retired in 1997.

Lienau died on 24 April 2021, aged 85.
