= Edmundo Galdino =

Brazilian politician (1958–2021)

Edmundo Galdino da Silva (Araguaína, 28 October 1958 – Araguaína, 22 April 2021) was a Brazilian politician who served as a Goiás MLA and later as a National Deputy from 2002 till 2006 and 1989 to 1995.

Da Silva died of heart and kidney failure, as well as COVID-19, on 22 April 2021, in Araguaína.
