= Kathie Coblentz =

American rare book librarian (1947–2021)

- Born: November 4, 1947; Lansing, Michigan
- Died: April 3, 2021 (aged 73); New York City, New York
- Occupation: librarian

Kathie Coblentz (November 4, 1947 – April 3, 2021) was a rare book librarian and author, known for her collaborations with Robert Kapsis on books about film directors such as Clint Eastwood, Woody Allen, and Alfred Hitchcock. She was New York Public Library's third-longest serving employee, starting at the library right after graduating from the University of Michigan in 1969. She worked as a rare materials cataloger for NYPL's Spencer Collection, a collection of "illustrated word and book bindings." She also wrote posts for the NYPL's blog that considered the Spencer Collection's materials. Coblentz gave tours of the closed stacks at the library and published her stack tour "patter" on the library's website.

In 2003, Coblentz published The New York Public Library Guide to Organizing a Home Library. In her view, a home organizing system "doesn't have to be logical, it just has to work for you." The book came packaged with software to assist bibliophiles with classifying and cataloging their collections. She had an extensive home library with sixteen bookcases, containing approximately 3,600 books.

== Personal life ==
Coblentz was born on November 4, 1947, to Dr. Jacob Coblentz, a bacteriologist and Sidney Ellarea Coblentz, an art teacher and artist. She graduated from Michigan State University in 1968 with a degree in German and received an MLIS from the University of Michigan in 1969. She read or spoke thirteen languages. She was killed by an automobile leaving a parking garage in Midtown Manhattan.
