= Fawzia Al-Abbasi =

Egyptian journalist and television pioneer (1940–2021)

- Born: October 1940; Cairo Governorate, Kingdom of Egypt
- Died: 27 April 2021 (aged 80)
- Occupations: Journalist and television personality

Fawzia Al-Abbasi (Arabic: فوزية العباسي; October 1940 – 27 April 2021) was an Egyptian journalist and television pioneer.

== Artistic Works ==
She presented many television programs since the beginning of television broadcasting in Egypt in 1960, most notably: Twenty Questions, for Adults Only, The World of Literature. Fawzia Al-Abbasi moved to the United Arab Emirates, where she presented successful television programs. She returned to Egypt in 1986 and started two new programs: Letters and Numbers and Kalima in the Evening. The Kalima program continued on the network for seven years and is considered one of the most popular shows she put out on Egyptian television.

== Family ==
Fawzia Al-Abbasi was raised in a prominent family. Her father was Lieutenant Colonel Fouad Talaat Al-Abbasi, the warden of Tora Prison, and her grandfather was Brigadier General Ali Pasha Al-Abbasi, the governor of Dakahlia Governorate in Egypt. Her mother was Munira Al-Zeini, daughter of a prominent figure in the Dakahlia Governorate, Al-Saeed Bek Al-Zeini. Fawzia Al-Abbasi's husband was the late Dr. Amir Al-Rifai of the Arab League and was one of the most prominent members of the Zamalek Club's board of directors.

== Death ==
Al-Abbasi died on 27 April 2021, aged 80.
