= La Camboria =

Spanish flamenco dancer (1931–2021)

Carmen Salazar Vargas (4 May 1931 – 24 April 2021), known as La Camboria, was a Spanish flamenco dancer (bailaora).

== Biography and career ==
La Camboria was born in "La Macarena" neighborhood of Cádiz in 1931. She began her artistic career in 1962, with "Juerga Flamenca" and at the age of 13 she made her debut at the "Teatro Cómico" in Madrid, to later perform in Paris, replacing Carmen Amaya.

After a tour in Europe, in the Scala Theatre in London she met the British writer Agatha Christie with whom she became a lasting friend. Christie, according to Salazar, even wrote a novel for her, which she did not premiere.

In December 2010 she participated in gossip TV program ¿Dónde estás corazón?.

== Personal life and death ==
La Camboria married Spanish journalist Lauren Postigo with whom she had a son, but divorced after 50 years of marriage. She died from COVID-19 at the age of 89 on 24 April 2021, amid its pandemic.
