= Julien Van Roosbroeck =

Belgian footballer (1935–2021)

Personal information
- Date of birth: 9 October 1935
- Date of death: 9 April 2021 (aged 85)

International career
Years	Team	Apps	(Gls)
1964	Belgium	1	(0)

Julien Van Roosbroeck (9 October 1935 – 9 April 2021) was a Belgian footballer. He played in one match for the Belgium national football team in 1964.
