= Thomas F. Coleman =

Canadian mathematician and computer scientist (1950–2021)

- Born: 1950; Montreal, Quebec
- Died: 20 April 2021 (aged 70–71)
- Occupation: Professor

Academic background
- Education: University of Waterloo, Ph.D., Mathematics, 1979

Academic work
- Institutions: Department of Combinatorics and Optimization, University of Waterloo

Thomas F. Coleman (1950–2021) was a Canadian mathematician and computer scientist who is a Professor in the Department of Combinatorics and Optimization at the University of Waterloo, where he held the Ophelia Lazaridis University Research Chair. In addition, Coleman was the director of WatRISQ, an institute composed of quantitative and computational finance researchers spanning several Faculties at the University of Waterloo. His research focused on mathematical optimization.

== Education ==
Coleman earned his PhD from University of Waterloo in 1979 with the dissertation A Superlinear Penalty Function Method to Solve the Nonlinear Programming Problem supervised by Andrew Conn. He followed that up with a two-year postdoctoral appointment in the Applied Mathematics Division at Argonne National Laboratory.

== Career ==
From 1981 to 2005, Coleman was a professor of computer science at Cornell University. From 1998 to 2005 he served as the director of Cornell Theory Center, now Cornell University Center for Advanced Computing

From 2005 to 2010, Coleman served as the dean of the Faculty of Mathematics at the University of Waterloo. During his tenure as Cornell Theory Center director, Coleman founded and directed a computational finance academic-industry-government venture located at 55 Broad Street in New York, which shaped into Cornell Financial Engineering Manhattan.

He died of cancer on April 20, 2021.

== Awards and honors ==
Coleman was selected a SIAM Fellow in 2016 "for his contributions to financial optimization, sparse numerical optimization and leadership in mathematical education and industry engagement".
