= Hubert Faure =

French military personnel (1914–2021)

Hubert Faure (28 May 1914 – 17 April 2021) was a French soldier during World War II. He was a member of the Kieffer commandos.
