= John Hopkins (travel writer) =

American novelist and travel writer (1938–2021)

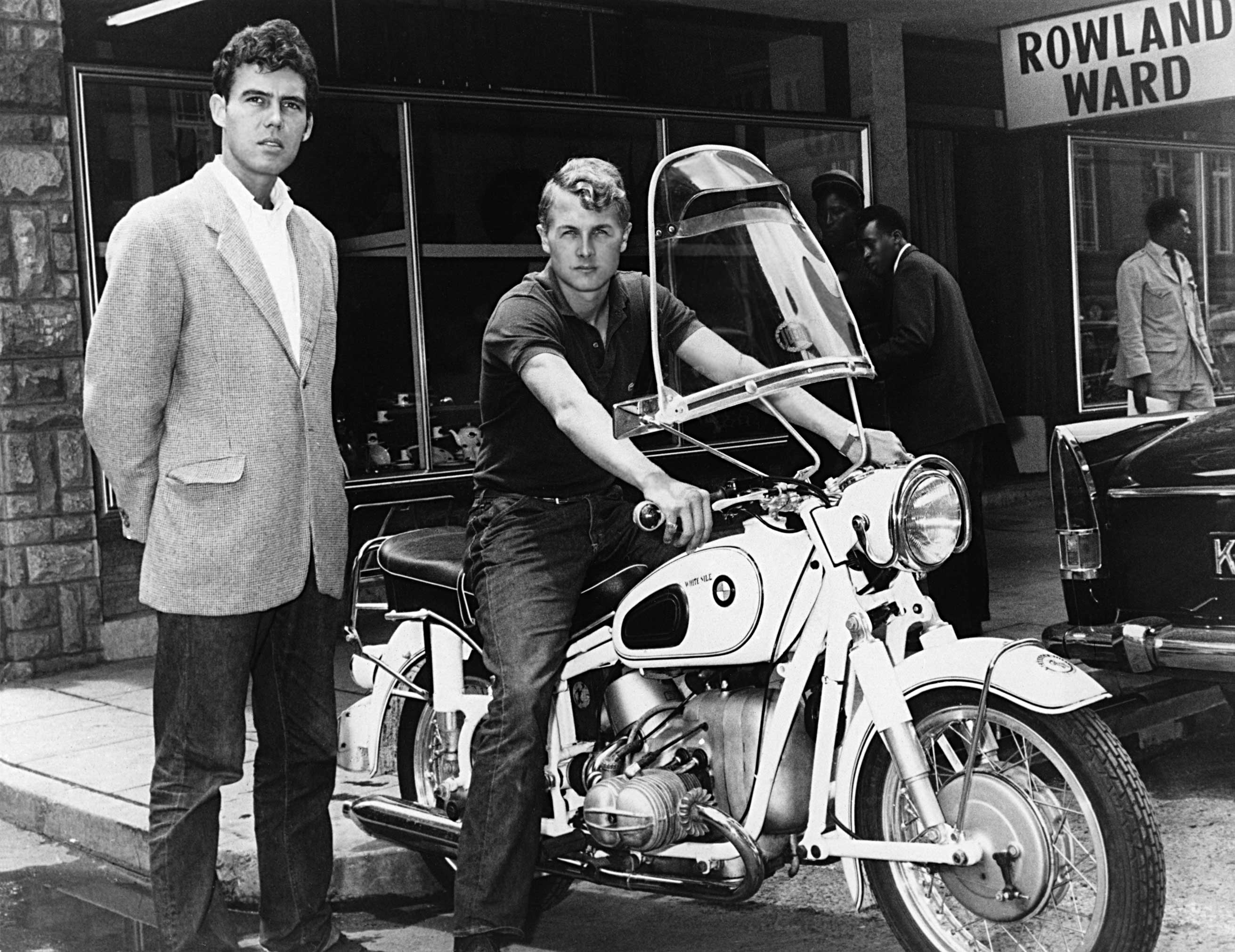
- John Hopkins (right) and Joe McPhillips (left) on ‘The White Nile’.
- Born: 5 August 1938; Orange, New Jersey, United States
- Died: 25 April 2021 (aged 82)
- Occupations: diarist, novelist
- Writing career
- Period: 1969–2021

John Livingston Hopkins Jr. (5 August 1938 – 25 April 2021) was an American novelist and travel writer.

== Biography ==
Hopkins was born in Orange, New Jersey.

Hopkins lived in Tangier, Morocco from 1962 to 1979 where he was a member of the Anglo/American literary crowd of the 1960s and 1970s, becoming friends with William Burroughs, Paul Bowles and Jane Bowles.

He wrote several novels, among them Tangier Buzzless Flies and The Flight of the Pelican, and travel memoirs including The Tangier Diaries, The South American Diaries and The White Nile Diaries.

Latterly Hopkins lived in Oxfordshire, England.

== Marriage and children ==
Hopkins married Ellen Ann Ragsdale in 1977. They had three sons.

== Bibliography ==
=== Novels ===
- The Attempt (1968)
- Tangier Buzzless Flies (1972)
- The Flight of the Pelican (1983)
- In the Chinese Mountains (1990)
- All I Wanted was Company (1999)

=== Diaries ===
- The Tangier Diaries 1962-1979 (1995)
- The South American Diaries (2007)
- The White Nile Diaries (2014)
