= Pedro Soto (politician) =

Spanish politician (1951–2021)

Pedro Soto García (1951 – 27 April 2021) was a Spanish politician who served as a Deputy.
