= Puerta (disambiguation) =

Puerta refers to the old original gates of the Walled City of Intramuros in Manila.

Puerta may also refer to:

== Places ==
- Puerta de Alcalá, a Neo-classical gate in the Plaza de la Independencia in Madrid
- Puerta de Alcántara, a city gate located in Toledo
- Puerta de Alarcones, a city gate located in the city of Toledo
- Puerta de Atocha, a gate in the city walls of Madrid
- Puerta de Bisagra, a city gate of Toledo
- Puerta de Bisagra Nueva, the best-known city gate of Toledo
- Puerta de Hierro, several places
- Puerta de los Doce Cantos, a city gate located in the city of Toledo
- Puerta de los Leones ("Lion's Gateway"), the main entrance to the first section of the Chapultepec Park, in Mexico City
- Puerta de San Andrés ("Gate of Saint Andrew"), a city gate in Segovia
- Puerta de San Fernando, a gate of the walled enclosure of Seville
- Puerta de San Vicente, a monumental gate located in the Glorieta de San Vicente in Madrid
- Puerta de Toledo, several places
- Puerta del Cambrón, a gate located in the city of Toledo
- Puerta del Carmen, a gate located in Zaragoza
- Puerta del Conde ("The Count's Gate"), the former main entrance to the fortified city of Santo Domingo
- Puerta del Puente, a Renaissance gate in Córdoba
- Puerta del Reloj, the main city gate of the historic center of Cartagena de Indias, Colombia
- Puerta del Vado, a 12th century city gate in Toledo
- Puerta Real, several places

== People ==
- Puerta (surname), Spanish surname

== Other uses ==
- Puerta 1808, an outdoor carbon steel sculpture by Manuel Felguérez
- Puerta 7, an Argentinian crime drama thriller television series
- Puerta del Sol, several things

== See also ==
- La Puerta
- De la Puerta
- Puertas, a municipality located in the province of Salamanca
- Puerto (disambiguation)
