= Puertas (surname) =

Puertas is a Spanish surname. Notable people with the surname include:

- Ángel Puertas (born 1980), Argentine footballer
- Antonio Puertas, Spanish footballer
- Cameron Puertas (born 1998), Spanish professional footballer
- Daniel Puertas Gallardo (born 1992), Spanish kickboxer
- Francisco Puertas (born 1963), Spanish rugby union footballer
- Geraldine Puertas (born 1988), Venezuelan softball player
- Javier Puertas Cabezudo, Spanish lightweight rower
- Paco Puertas (born 1995), Spanish professional footballer

== See also ==
- Puerta (surname), Spanish surname
- La Puerta (disambiguation)
- De la Puerta, Spanish surname
- Puertas, a municipality located in the province of Salamanca
