= Constructive dismissal =

Legal concept regarding termination of employment

In employment law, constructive dismissal (Note: Also called disguised dismissal, constructive discharge, or constructive termination.) occurs when an employee resigns due to the employer creating a hostile work environment. This often serves as a tactic for employers to avoid payment of statutory or contractual severance pay and benefits. In essence, although the employee resigns, the resignation is not truly voluntary but rather a response to intolerable working conditions imposed by the employer. These conditions can include unreasonable work demands, harassment, or significant changes to the employment terms without the employee’s consent.

The legal implications of constructive dismissal vary across jurisdictions, but generally, it results in the termination of the employee's obligations and grants them the right to pursue claims against the employer. Claims can arise from a single serious incident or a pattern of behaviour, and employees typically need to resign shortly after the intolerable conditions are imposed.

Guillermo Cabanellas explains that disguised dismissal occurs when the employer’s actions violate duties, forcing the employee to resign. This act, while not an explicit declaration of termination, effectively constitutes a dismissal.

== Overview ==
In the United States, there is no single federal or state law against constructive dismissal. However, it is recognized when intolerable working conditions violate employment legislation, such as the Family and Medical Leave Act, the Equal Pay Act, the Americans with Disabilities Act, and others. The burden of proof lies with the employee, who must demonstrate that the working conditions were so intolerable that a reasonable person in their position would feel compelled to resign. Canadian law also acknowledges constructive dismissal when an employer unilaterally changes the terms and conditions of employment to such an extent that the employee can consider the contract breached. This may include demotions, significant changes in job duties, or a hostile work environment. Employees must file a complaint within a specified period and may need to seek legal advice to pursue claims of constructive dismissal.

In all cases, the concept hinges on the employer's failure to meet contractual obligations, leading the employee to resign. The resignation is treated as a termination by the employer, allowing the employee to seek legal remedies for wrongful dismissal.

== United States law ==
In the United States, constructive discharge is a general term describing the involuntary resignation of an employee. There is no single federal or state law against constructive dismissal in general. From a legal standpoint, it occurs when an employee is forced to resign because of intolerable working conditions which violate employment legislation, such as:

- Family and Medical Leave Act of 1993 (FMLA)
- Equal Pay Act of 1963 (EPA)
- Change in schedules in order to force employee to quit (title 12)
- Americans with Disabilities Act of 1990 (ADA)
- Genetic Information Nondiscrimination Act of 2008 (GINA)
- Age Discrimination in Employment Act of 1967 (ADEA)
- Title VII of the Civil Rights Act of 1964 (Title VII)
- Any state employment law
- An employer showing favoritism to another employee without reason or explanation

The burden of proof in constructive dismissal cases lies with the employee.

The Equal Employment Opportunity Commission has provided a 3-part test to determine whether or not a constructive discharge has occurred: (1) a reasonable person in the complainant's position would have found the working conditions intolerable; (2) conduct that constituted discrimination against the complainant created the intolerable working conditions; and (3) the complainant's involuntary resignation resulted from the intolerable working conditions.

In California, the California Supreme Court defines constructive discharge as follows: "in order to establish a constructive discharge, an employee must plead and prove, by the usual preponderance of the evidence standard, that the employer either intentionally created or knowingly permitted working conditions that were so intolerable or aggravated at the time of the employee's resignation that a reasonable employer would realize that a reasonable person in the employee's position would be compelled to resign."

== Canadian law ==
Canadian courts recognize there are circumstances in which the employer, although not acting explicitly to terminate an individual's employment, alters the employment relationship's terms and conditions to such a degree that an employee is entitled to regard the employer's conduct as a termination, and claim wrongful dismissal, just as if they had been let go without any notice or termination pay in lieu of notice.

Constructive dismissal arises from the failure of the employer to live up to the essential obligations of the employment relationship, regardless of whether the employee signed a written employment contract. Employment law implies into employment relationships a common-law set of terms and conditions applicable to all employees. For example, once agreed upon, wages are implicitly locked in by the common-law of contract as an essential term of the employment relationship. In this regard, it is a constructive dismissal if an employer fails to pay an employee.

An employer's breach of the employment contract releases the employee from their obligation to perform under the contract, and thus allows them to treat themselves as dismissed without notice.

== Hong Kong case ==
The Hong Kong Court of First Instance has confirmed in Caidao Capital Ltd v Harmen Christiaan Overdijk & Ors [2026] HKCFI 1326 that the definition of “wages” under the Employment Ordinance is broad enough to cover commission-only payments under a profit share remuneration structure and that withholding those payments can amount to constructive dismissal. Employers who impose new conditions on commission payments, suspend them unilaterally or rely on ambiguous audit clauses to withhold remuneration face significant legal exposure.

=== Subject ===
Applying the following provisions in Part III of the Canada Labour Code to cases of constructive dismissal:

- unjust dismissal
- severance pay and
- individual terminations of employment

=== Interpretation ===
==== Constructive dismissals are covered under Part III of the Code ====
The unjust dismissal provisions in section 240 of the Code cover unjust constructive dismissals. They also cover unjust dismissals made by the open unambiguous action of the employer.

This issue was resolved conclusively in the Federal Court of Appeal decision in Srougi v. Lufthansa German Airlines, [1988] F.C.J. Nº 539. According to the Srougi decision, once it has been established that a constructive dismissal has occurred, there is no question that the unjust dismissal provisions apply.

The individual terminations of employment provisions may also apply in cases of constructive dismissal. This includes provisions in sections 230 to 234 of the Code, and the severance pay provisions in sections 235 to 237.

Unfortunately, the characterization of a constructive dismissal is not always straightforward.

==== Definition ====
The phrase "constructive dismissal" describes situations where the employer has not directly fired the employee. Rather the employer has:

- failed to comply with the contract of employment in a major respect
- unilaterally changed the terms of employment, or
- expressed a settled intention to do either thus forcing the employee to quit

Constructive dismissal is sometimes called "disguised dismissal" or "quitting with cause". This is because it often occurs in situations where the employer offers the employee the alternative of:

- leaving, or
- submitting to a unilateral and substantial alteration of a fundamental term or condition of their employment

Whether or not there has been a constructive dismissal is based on an objective view of the employer's conduct. It is not merely on how the employee perceives the situation.

It is the employer's failure to meet its contractual obligations that distinguishes a constructive dismissal from an ordinary resignation. The seriousness of the employer's failure as well as the amount of deliberation apparent in its actions are also important factors.

The employer's action must be unilateral, which means the employer must do it without the consent of the employee. If it is not unilateral, the variation is not a constructive dismissal but merely an agreed change to the contract of employment.

If the employee clearly indicates non-acceptance of the new conditions of employment to the employer, there has been a constructive dismissal. However, this is only if the employee leaves within a reasonable period (usually short). By not resigning, the employee indicates he accepts the new conditions of employment.

There have been cases where courts have held that there has been a constructive dismissal even though the complainant remains in the employ of the employer. This includes, for example, cases where the employee:

- continues to work under the new conditions in order to mitigate damages, and
- either protests the new conditions explicitly or makes it clear that he still reserves the right to take legal action

In such cases, the employee cannot be said to have condoned or accepted the change in working conditions if the employee:

- formally commences legal proceedings in respect of the change while remaining in the employ of the employer, or
- does not formally initiate proceedings but simply attempts to negotiate the matter while remaining at work

A constructive dismissal takes place at the time the employer changes the terms and conditions of employment. In order to be admissible, the complainant must file the complaint within 90 days of that time as required by subsection 240(2) of the Code.

Exception: This does not apply if the complainant qualifies for extending their time to file under subsection 240(3) of the Code.

In cases of alleged unjust dismissal, a doubt may exist as to whether the complainant has been constructively dismissed. In these cases, the Labour Program shall proceed to assist the parties in reaching a settlement. If the parties do not reach a settlement within a reasonable time, the Labour Program, on the request of the complainant, will refer the complaint to the Canada Industrial Relations Board.

Complainants alleging constructive dismissal should be advised that they may wish to seek independent legal advice.

=== Examples ===
The following examples are of cases in which the courts have found that an employee has been constructively dismissed. The examples are not exhaustive and the results will vary with the facts of each case and with the terms of each employment contract.

==== Changes to the employment relationship ====
Typically, the first way to claim constructive dismissal involves an employer making substantial changes to the employment contract, such as:

1. a demotion;
2. altering the employee's reporting structure, job description or working conditions;
3. lowering an employee's compensation;
4. changing hours of work;
5. imposing a suspension or leave of absence; and
6. relocating the employee's workplace.

In addition, failure on the part of an employer to provide employment standards (e.g. overtime pay, vacation pay, etc.), can result in a constructive dismissal.

Nevertheless, for an employee to have a successful case for constructive dismissal, the employer's breach must be fundamental. What is "fundamental" depends on the circumstances, and not all changes to the employment relationship give rise to a constructive dismissal. For example, administrative, i.e. non-disciplinary, suspensions might not amount to a constructive dismissal if imposed in good faith and justified by legitimate business reasons (i.e. lack of work). As well, a small reduction in salary, in tough times, and administered rationally, might not be a constructive dismissal.

==== Toxic work environments ====
An employee may also be able to claim a constructive dismissal based on an employer's conduct, rather than a change to a specific or implied term of the employment contract. Here, the second way to claim constructive dismissal examines whether the employer's (or employee of the employer) course of conduct, or even a single incident, demonstrates an intention to no longer be bound by the written or implied employment contract. An example of this kind of constructive dismissal is a "toxic work environment". In this regard, if a work environment is so poisoned that a reasonable person wouldn't be expected to return, then constructive dismissal is likely.

A toxic work environment is classically defined as unjustified criticism as well as vague and unfounded accusations of poor performance, especially where authority and respect with co-workers had been seriously undermined and compromised. Another example of toxic work environment is where the employer fails to prevent workplace harassment.

==== Threats ====
In some cases, an employee's decision to quit in response to threats of dismissal or demotion has been found to constitute a constructive dismissal. However, mere encouragement to resign will not necessarily be sufficient. Similarly, a constructive dismissal may occur when an unfair suspension or reduction in salary creates an intolerable situation for the employee.

== UK law ==
In United Kingdom law, constructive dismissal is defined by the Employment Rights Act 1996 section 95(1)c:

The employee terminates the contract under which they are employed (with or without notice) in circumstances in which they are entitled to terminate it without notice by reason of the employer's conduct.

The circumstances in which an employee is entitled are defined in common law. The notion of constructive dismissal most often arises from a fundamental breach of the term of trust and confidence implied in all contracts of employment. In order to avoid such a breach "[a]n employer must not, without reasonable or proper cause, conduct himself in a manner calculated or likely to destroy or seriously damage the relationship of trust and confidence between the employer and the employee." Whilst a breach can be of the implied term of trust and confidence, a fundamental breach of any of the express or implied terms of a contract of employment is sufficient. The examples given on this page for actions by an employer likely to constitute grounds for constructive dismissal under Canadian law also almost certainly hold true under English law.

The Department of Trade and Industry states:

A tribunal may rule that an employee who resigns because of conduct by his or her employer has been 'constructively dismissed'. For a tribunal to rule in this way the employer's action has to be such that it can be regarded as a significant breach of the employment contract indicating that he or she intends no longer to be bound by one or more terms of the contract: an example of this might be where the employer arbitrarily demotes an employee to a lower rank or poorer paid position. The contract is what has been agreed between the parties, whether orally or in writing, or a combination of both, together with what must necessarily be implied to make the contract workable.

Following constructive dismissal, a claim for unfair dismissal and/or wrongful dismissal may arise.

=== Types of constructive dismissal ===
Although they tend to blend into one in a tribunal, strictly there are two types of constructive dismissal: statutory and common law.

At common law the requirement is acceptance of a repudiatory breach, which means the employer has indicated it no longer considers itself bound by an essential term of the contract, e.g. the requirement to pay wages or the requirement not to destroy the mutual bond of trust and confidence. It does not matter if the employer did not mean to repudiate the contract.

Under statute the requirement is employer's "conduct" allowing the employee to "terminate with or without notice"; as this can only happen with a repudiatory breach it amounts to the same thing.

=== Relation to unfair dismissal ===
A common mistake is to assume that constructive dismissal is exactly the same as unfair treatment of an employee – it can sometimes be that treatment that can be considered generally evenhanded nevertheless makes life so difficult that the employee is in essence forced to resign (e.g., a fair constructive dismissal might be a unilateral change of contract justified by a bigger benefit to the business than the inconvenience to the employee), but the Employment Appeal Tribunal doubts that it will be very often that the employer can breach ERA96 s98(4) whilst being fair.

A constructive dismissal occurs when the employer's repudiatory breach causes the employee to accept that the contract has been terminated, by resigning. The fairness of it would have to be looked at separately under a statutory claim for unfair dismissal.

The problems for the employer are that constructive dismissal is a contractual claim, which can be made in a tribunal for up to £25,000 or in court without limit, and, by dismissing constructively, it by definition misses out on the correct procedure meaning that even if the reason was fair, the decision was probably not, and so an unfair dismissal usually arises, creating a statutory claim alongside the contractual claim.

The court can look behind the lack of, or different, stated reason given by the employee at the time of resignation to establish that a cover story was in fact a resignation caused by fundamental breach.

=== Typical causes ===
The person causing the dismissal does not need the authority to dismiss, as long as they acted in the course of employment.

==== Grounds ====
Constructive dismissal is typically caused by:-

- unilateral contract changes by the employer such as:
  - deliberate cuts in pay or status (even temporary),
  - persistent delayed wages,
  - refusal of holiday,
  - withdrawal of car,
  - suspension without pay (or even on full pay),
  - dramatic changes to duties, hours or location (beyond reasonable daily travelling distance), or
- breach of contract in the form of bullying, e.g.:
  - ignoring complaints,
  - persistent unwanted amorous advances,
  - bullying and swearing,
  - verbal abuse (typically referring to gender, size or incompetence),
  - singling out for no pay rise,
  - criticising in front of subordinates,
  - lack of support (e.g. forcing to do two peoples' jobs),
  - failure to notify a woman on maternity leave of a vacancy which she would have applied for if she had been made aware of it,
  - refusal to confirm continuity on TUPE transfer,
  - revealing secret complaints in a reference (even ones required by a regulator), or
- breaches such as:
  - behaviour which is arbitrary, capricious, inequitable, intolerable or outside good industrial practice,
  - conduct that undermined trust and confidence (i.e. offering an incentive to resign to avoid performance managing capability),
  - refusal to look for an alternative role due to workplace stress,
  - disproportionate disciplinary penalty,
  - employer tricks employee into resigning.

==== Flexibility and mobility clauses ====
A flexibility clause does not allow the employer to change a type of job as it is implied that the flexibility is to operate within the original job.

A mobility clause is subject to the implied term of mutual trust which prevents the employer from sending an employee to the other side of the country without adequate notice or from doing anything which makes it impossible for the employee to keep his side of the bargain.

==== Insufficient grounds ====
There is no right to automatic pay rises. Nor is a smoking ban a breach.

=== Compensation ===
The employee's conduct is irrelevant to liability, although it can affect quantum; in other words it cannot get the employer off the hook, but could reduce compensation if the employee helped bring about their own downfall.

=== Timing ===
The conduct by the employer could be:

- a one-off repudiatory or fundamental breach of contract,
- a series of acts or omissions which amount to a repudiatory or fundamental breach of contract, or
- a 'last straw' act or omission which, although in itself not a repudiatory or fundamental breach of contract can when taken in the context of earlier breaches amount to conduct which is a repudiatory or fundamental breach of contract.

Note: unreasonable conduct will not suffice to establish constructive dismissal claim since a repudiatory or fundamental breach of contract must be established.

=== Employee must resign quickly ===
The employee has to resign within a reasonable time of the trigger, which is the one-off outrage or the last straw. The employee could work under protest while he or she finds a new job.

==== Waiver ====
If the employer alleges that the employee waived a breach by not resigning, each breach needs to be looked at to see if it was waived separately, but even if a breach was waived, the last straw revives it for the purpose of determining whether overall there was a repudiation.

==== Affirmation ====
If the employer alleges that the employee has affirmed a breach by not resigning, the employee could point out that no consideration was paid for it and so no contract change has been accepted. Acceptance of a replacement job would prove affirmation.

An employee who stays on for a year after refusing to sign a new contract does not necessarily accept it.

==== Last straw ====
The last straw does not have to be similar to the earlier string of events or even unreasonable or blameworthy – it need only be related to the obligation of trust and confidence and enough that when added to the earlier events the totality is a repudiation.

==== Notice period ====
Although the employer's breach must be serious enough to entitle the employee to resign without notice, the employee is entitled to give notice if they prefer, so that they could enjoy the benefit of wages during the notice period.

To prevent the employer alleging that the resignation was caused by a job offer, the employee should resign first and then seek a new job during the notice period.

During the notice period, the employer could make the employee redundant or summarily dismiss them, if it has the grounds to do so fairly. Otherwise, the reason for termination will be resignation and not dismissal, since the employee cannot serve a counternotice.

== Spanish law ==
Disguised dismissal (Spanish: despido encubierto) in Spanish labour law is a mechanism through which employers indirectly force employees to resign, thereby evading legal responsibilities. Article 50 of the Workers' Statute provides a legal remedy for employees, allowing them to terminate their contract with the right to compensation.

=== Definition ===
Disguised dismissal, as defined by the Diccionario Panhispánico del Español Jurídico, refers to an employer's covert act designed to compel a worker to terminate their employment voluntarily. This tactic is often used to avoid paying indemnities and legal benefits. The employer creates conditions so intolerable that the worker feels forced to dissolve the labor contract.

=== Legal framework ===
In Spain, disguised dismissal is addressed under Article 50 of the Workers' Statute. This article allows an employee to request termination of the employment relationship due to serious breaches by the employer. When justified, the employee is entitled to compensation equivalent to that of unfair dismissal and unemployment benefits, provided they have paid the requisite contributions. The specified causes for invoking Article 50 include:

- Substantial Changes in Working Conditions: Changes made without adhering to Article 41 that undermine the worker's dignity.
- Non-payment or Delays in Salary: Continuous failure to pay the agreed salary on time.
- Other Serious Breaches: Any other significant violations of the employer's obligations, excluding force majeure. This includes refusal to reintegrate the worker into previous conditions following a court ruling that declared the changes unjustified.

=== Judicial precedents ===
An example is the Judgment of the High Court of Justice of Andalusia, Ceuta and Melilla, Social Chamber, 2016. In this case, the plaintiff argued that their transfer from Seville to Alcobendas was a disguised dismissal. The court found that the transfer, given the worker's age, personal and family circumstances, and the adverse economic conditions associated with the move, was a deliberate attempt by the employer to force the worker to resign.

=== Theoretical perspectives ===
Guillermo Cabanellas de Torres, in his Compendio de Derecho Laboral, elaborates on disguised dismissal. He explains that the employer, by violating legal and contractual duties, puts the employee in a position where continuing to work is untenable due to moral and economic damage. This act, while not an explicit declaration of termination, effectively constitutes a dismissal. The termination, though initiated by the worker, is actually caused by the employer's unilateral and irregular actions.
