= Puerta (surname) =

Puerta is a Spanish surname. Notable people with the surname include:

- Antonio Puerta, Spanish footballer
  - Antonio Puerta Trophy, an annual summer tournament hosted by Sevilla FC since 2008
- Alonso Puerta, Spanish politician
- Ashlyn Puerta (born 2007), American professional soccer player
- Fabián Puerta (born 1991), Colombian track cyclist
- Gustavo Puerta (born 2003), Colombian professional footballer
- Joe Puerta (born 1951), American bassist/vocalist
- Jose Antonio Espin Puerta (born 1985), Spanish professional footballer
- Lina Puerta, American artist
- María Adelaida Puerta (born 1982), Colombian actress
- Mariano Puerta, Argentinian tennis player
- Ramón Puerta, Argentinian politician

== See also ==
- Puertas (surname), Spanish surname
- La Puerta (disambiguation)
- De la Puerta, Spanish surname
