= Eduardo de Lázzari =

Argentine judge (died 2021)

Eduardo Néstor de Lázzari (1944/1945 – 19 April 2021) was an Argentine lawyer and judge, justice president of the Supreme Court of Justice of Buenos Aires between 2004 and 2005, between 2012 and 2013, and from 24 April 2019 to 18 April 2020.

== Biography ==
He graduated from the University of La Plata in 1967. He was the Secretary of security of the province of Buenos Aires during the Eduardo Duhalde governorship, until the assassination of journalist José Luis Cabezas and the subsequent protests forced him to resign in January 1997. He was named Justice of the Supreme Court of Justice of Buenos Aires in 1997 by Duhalde. In 2019 he had some controversies. Firstly, he had several disputes with then-provincial governor María Eugenia Vidal as he opposed the appointment of Sergio Torres as new justice of the Court at Vidal's proposal. Secondly, as then-head of the Provincial Electoral Board, he accepted some candidacies that were invalidated, being accused of being close to Kirchnerism.

de Lázzari submitted his resignation from the Court to the Governor of Buenos Aires Province Axel Kicillof in February 2021 after 24 years in the office and it was effective from 1 March 2021.

He died from COVID-19 in the Italian Hospital of La Plata on 19 April 2021, at the age of 76.
