= July 1936 coup d'état in Granada =

Battle of the Spanish Civil War

- Part of the Spanish Civil War
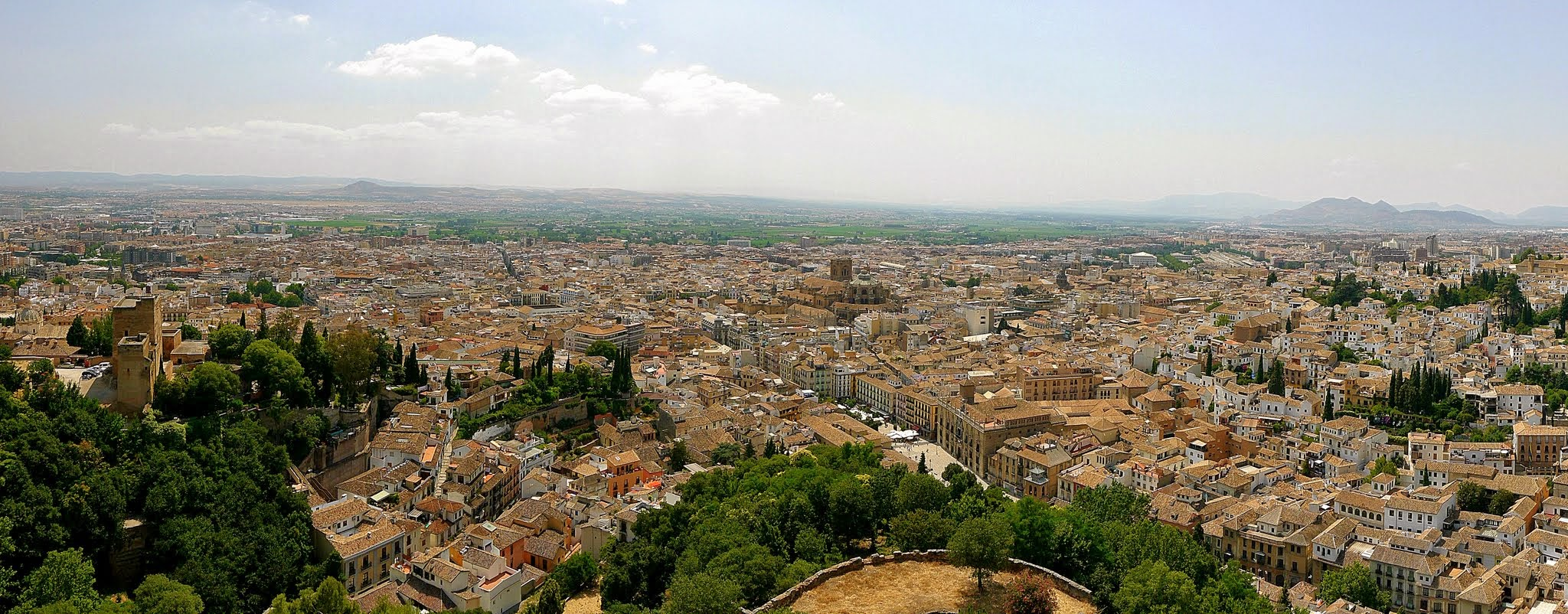
- Granada, as seen from the Alhambra.
Date	20–23 July 1936
Location	Granada, Spain
Result	Nationalist victory

Belligerents
(Spain) Spanish Republic	(Francoist Spain) Nationalist rebels

Commanders and leaders
(Spain) César Torres Martínez (surrendered) (Spain) Fernando Vidal Pagán (surrendered)	(Francoist Spain) Basilio León Maestre (Francoist Spain) Antonio Muñoz Jiménez (Francoist Spain) José Valdés Guzmán (Francoist Spain) José Nestares Cuéllar

The July 1936 coup d'état in Granada against the government of the Spanish Republic, which started the Civil War, managed to triumph in Granada and take control of the city.

On July 20, at five o'clock in the afternoon, the garrison of Granada revolted against the Government. On the 17th, the coup plotters of the African Army had seized the Spanish protectorate of Morocco, and on the 18th the conspirators led by General Gonzalo Queipo de Llano had risen in Seville, and also in Cordoba. The military commander of Granada, general Miguel Campins, was forced to sign the war proclamation, while the Nationalist troops and militias managed to quickly take control of the city center. The civil governor César Torres Martínez and the local commander of the Civil Guard, as well as the mayor of the city and the president of the deputation, were arrested. The rebels also managed to occupy the Armilla Airbase and other strategic points.

The government loyalists, despite being poorly armed and disorganized, made themselves strong in the Albaicín neighborhood. The rebels brought artillery and after several days of heavy fighting managed to conquer it. At the fall of the Albaicín, all of Granada was under the control of the rebels.

During this fighting the rebels arrested and in many cases executed any republicans or suspected republicans. It is not known how many people were executed. After the conquest of Granada, a strong repression against supporters of the Republic was launched. It is estimated that 5,000 people were executed during the conflict.

== Background ==
=== Political and social situation ===
Since the 1936 Spanish general election, the political-social climate in Granada had become extraordinarily polarized. The victory of the Popular Front and the return of the left to the municipal corporation was not well received by the conservative parties. Granada was a province where conservative and right-wing forces had an important presence. On March 8, the leftists organized a large rally at the Los Cármenes stadium that later toured the city, calling for the annulment of the election results, which were believed to have been fraudulent due to pressure and intervention by the local caciques. The following day, at a mass meeting of workers with their families, Falange gunmen caused several injuries among some women and children attending the event. The unions reacted by calling a general strike for the following day, March 10.

On the day of the strike the atmosphere was highly charged. Throughout the day incidents occurred all over the city. At 9:30 some workers burned the Falange local, located at number 3 Cuesta del Progreso. Then, other groups set fire to the Isabel la Católica Theater, the Colón and Royal cafés, and the headquarters of the conservative newspaper Ideal, whose machinery was destroyed and the premises burned to the ground. While these incidents were taking place, groups of right-wing gunmen fired from the rooftops at the demonstrators and the policemen who were present there. The premises of the Popular Action (Spanish: Acción Popular, AP) party and of the Acción Obrerista of the CEDA were also set on fire, the chocolate factory owned by a local CEDA leader, the Granada Tennis Club, the Convent of San Gregorio el Bajo and the Church of El Salvador, which was practically destroyed. It is unknown who were the perpetrators of many of these fires, although historian Ian Gibson notes the possibility that among the arsonists were some right-wing provocateurs. What is documented is that the police were present, but did not intervene to prevent these incidents. The riots caused a great commotion among the middle class in Granada and left a feeling of hatred and revenge among many Granadians.

As a result of the serious riots of March 10, the police arrested more than three hundred people and carried out numerous house searches, seizing a large number of weapons both in the city of Granada and in the province. The incidents resulted in the dismissal of the civil and military governors. The military commander, General Eliseo Álvarez-Arenas, had gone so far as to threaten to take the troops out into the streets if the riots did not end. He was replaced by general Llanos Medina, a military man markedly right-wing and with whom the military conspiracy would begin.

On March 31, with the votes in favor of the left and against the right, the Cortes annulled the results of the February elections in Granada and called for a rerun of the elections for May. The Popular Front won the repeat elections on May 3, with the thirteen Socialist and Progressive candidates obtaining deputies. The rightists did not obtain any deputies. The electoral failure of the rightists meant a strengthening of the Granada Falange, which at the level of all Spain had been very weakened after the illegalization of the party and the decapitation of its leadership. Many members of the juventudes of the CEDA switched to Falange.

=== Coup plot ===
After the electoral victory of the Popular Front, reactionary and royalist officers began preparations for a military uprising. Republican authorities in Madrid ordered the civil governor of Granada, Ernesto Vega, to place under surveillance several officers of the Granada garrison who were known for their anti-Republican sentiments. But they realized that they were being watched, which may have led to Vega's dismissal on June 25. He was replaced by César Torres Martínez. Upon his arrival in Granada, Torres Martínez found a complex situation: a tramway strike and another of garbage collectors, the leftist councilors of the city council at odds with each other, and various problems in some towns of the province. Although he managed to stabilize the situation, in just 25 days in office he was only able to make contact with the military and civil conspiracy.

In 1936, Granada was the headquarters of the 3rd Infantry Brigade and depended militarily on the II Organic Division, headquartered in Seville. The military garrison of Granada was composed of the Infantry Regiment No. 2, commanded by Colonel Basilio León Maestre, and the Light Artillery Regiment No. 4, commanded by Colonel Antonio Muñoz Jiménez. The Infantry Regiment had about 300 troops, while the Artillery Regiment had about 180. The regiments had few forces available because the officers had granted many summer leaves.

Initially, the visible head of the military conspiracy in Granada was General Llanos Medina, but the government knew of his conspiratorial activities and on July 10 he was dismissed and transferred. He was replaced by Brigadier General Miguel Campins, who took command of the garrison on July 11. Campins was not involved in the military conspiracy, and it was done behind his back. Colonels León Maestre and Muñoz Jiménez were involved in the conspiracy and had the support of other anti-Republican officers of the Granada garrison. Other officers were also prominent in the conspiracy, such as the infantry commander Rodríguez Bouza or the commander José Valdés Guzmán. In the case of Valdés, his contribution to the conspiracy was important, since he had been head of the military administration of the Granada garrison since 1931, and in 1936 he was already well acquainted with the local political and military situation (unlike other posts, which frequently changed posting). In addition, Valdés was a member of Falange, "camisa vieja" (Spanish: "old shirt") and head of the Falange militias in Granada. The conspiracy also extended to other areas outside the Army.

The Security and Assault Corps was commanded by Captain Alvarez, and its forces numbered about 150-300 troops. While the Assault forces were not involved in the conspiracy, their former commander, Assault Captain José Nestares Cuéllar was. (Note: Until the beginning of 1936, Nestares had been the head of the Security and Assault Corps in Granada; but he was dismissed after the riots of March 10. —Gibson (1981, p. 76)) The Guardia Civil had about 40 troops in the city of Granada. The commander of the Civil Guard command in Granada, Lieutenant Colonel Fernando Vidal Pagán, was loyal to the Republic; this was not the case of Lieutenant Mariano Pelayo, who conspired against him and who would play an important role in the uprising. The Falange granadina also had an important role in the conspiracy; it is not known with certainty how many troops it had, but they probably did not exceed 400. Also involved in the conspiracy—although with a minor role—were several right-wing politicians who had not been elected in the May elections. (Note: Such was the case of the former deputy of the CEDA and new shirt of the Falange, Ramón Ruiz Alonso. —Gibson (1981, p. 67))

== The previous days ==
On July 17, in the afternoon, the military garrison of Melilla unexpectedly revolted. After Melilla, the other squares of the protectorate of Morocco followed, and then—the next day—there was the uprising of the garrison of the Canary Islands, under the command of General Francisco Franco.

On July 18, the atmosphere in Granada was tense; the military governor, General Campins, condemned the uprising in Morocco, while Popular Front organizations demonstrated throughout the day. Campins held a meeting at the civilian government with the local Republican authorities, telling them that he had full confidence in the officers under his command and that they were loyal Republicans. However, this attitude of Campins contrasted with the telegram that same day he had sent to General Franco, where he informed him that he placed himself under his orders.

That day the uprising spread to the Iberian Peninsula. At two o'clock in the afternoon a part of the Seville garrison revolted against the Government. General Queipo de Llano arrested the commanders of the II Organic Division and took control of it. Although he met strong popular resistance in several parts of the city, Queipo de Llano managed to dominate the urban center and the Tablada airfield. A few hours later, in the city of Cordoba, Colonel Ciriaco Cascajo—following Queipo de Llano's instructions—at five o'clock in the afternoon revolted the artillery regiment and proclaimed a state of war, managing to dominate the city.

On July 19, the situation in Granada was still in dead pause, with the conspiracy immobilized and with the Popular Front militants still unarmed. The civil governor, Torres Martínez, refused again and again to distribute arms among the workers' organizations that demanded them, following the slogans of the head of the government, Casares Quiroga, not to arm the population. The Minister of War, General Luis Castelló, called Campins to tell him to organize a column to go to Córdoba and put an end to Colonel Cascajo's uprising; however, the officers of the garrison were very much not in favor of this idea. Vidal Pagán also received from Madrid the order to gather armamentd for the Córdoba column, but when he went to the Artillery Barracks he met with the rejection of the military commanders who, in order not to deliver him the requested armaments, gave him excuses and various pretexts. Some troops of the Granada garrison were sent to Almería, where they would later contribute to the failure of the uprising in that city. Campins went to the artillery barracks, where he made a harangue to the officers about the futility and dishonor of the military rebellion. Captain Nestares, for his part, went visiting the various military barracks in the city, urging the conspirators to take the initiative. That night the conspirators stayed awake, coordinating plans to revolt.

== The coup ==
On July 20, the uprising of the garrison was finally decided, under the auspices of Colonels Muñoz and León. Throughout that morning preparations continued to execute the seizure of the city, which would begin at 17:00. After Commander Rodríguez Bouza visited and met the head of the Assault GUards, Captain Álvarez, the latter finally agreed to join the uprising. For the conspirators that was a decisive moment.

At 16:30 the secretary of the local Popular Front Committee, Antonio Rus Romero, received a telephone call informing him that the troops at the Artillery Barracks were forming up and were ready to leave. He transmitted this to Torres Martínez, who immediately spoke with Campins. The general told Torres Martínez that he had no record of that and again insisted on the loyalty of his officers; he concluded that he would pay a visit to the Artillery Barracks, from where he would call to confirm that nothing was happening. However, when Campins arrived there he verified that indeed the troops were in formation, and that there was even a group of armed countrymen—mainly Falangists. Then a strong discussion arose between the general and Colonel Muñoz. Campins discovered to his bewilderment that all his officers—as well as the officers of the Guardia Civil and the Assault Guards—were involved in the coup plot. In view of that situation, he tried to leave, but his aides blocked his way; one of them suggested that he declare a state of war and sign the military proclamation (which the conspirators had already drafted). After going to the Infantry Barracks and making sure that they were also with the rebels, Campins was taken to the military command and signed the Bando de Guerra.

=== The occupancy of the urban centre ===
Under the leadership of Colonel Antonio Muñoz, at 17:00 the garrison troops left their barracks located on the outskirts of the city and headed for the urban centre. Some civilians thought that the troops had left their barracks in defense of the Republican order. The Minister of the Interior, General Sebastián Pozas, had already telephoned the civil governor exhorting him to offer a "desperate and bloody resistance." The rebels placed artillery pieces at several points in the city: in the Plaza del Carmen (in front of the ayuntamiento), at the Puerta Real and in the Plaza de la Trinidad (next to the civil government). Another battery was established on the road that went to El Fargue, since from there it dominated a strategic position to bombard the city. In front of the Guardia de Asalto barracks, located on the Gran Vía, a truck with soldiers was stopped and immediately afterwards the assault guards joined the uprising.

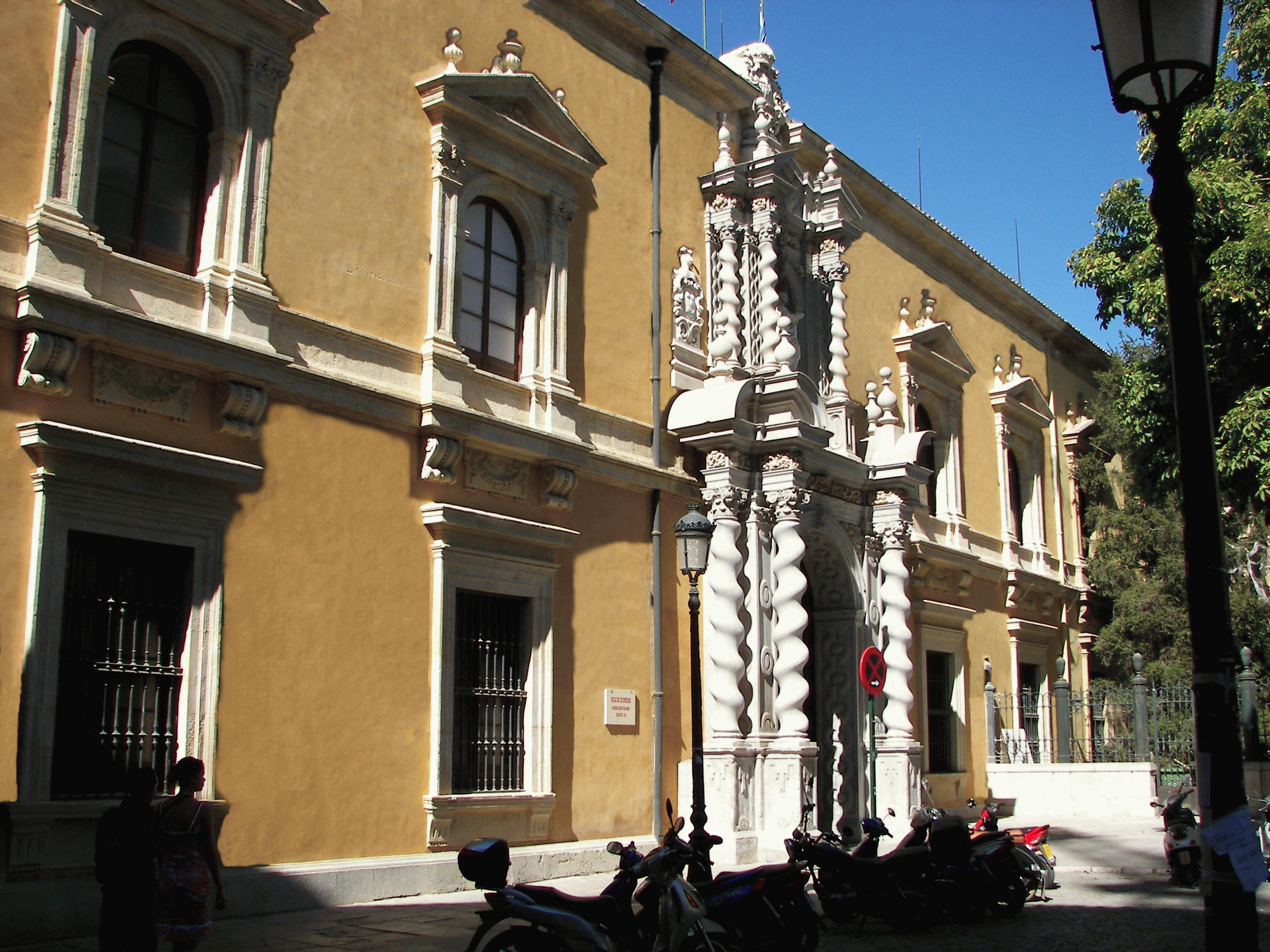
Facade of the Facultad de Derecho in Granada, a building that in 1936 housed the headquarters of the civil government.

The rebels headed towards the surroundings of the Civil Government, which was protected by a section of 20-25 assault guards under the command of Lieutenant Martínez Fajardo and with orders to shoot. Inside, Torres Martínez and his aides were already aware that the military were already in the streets of Granada. At 18:00 Captain Nestares arrived at the police station on Duquesa Street, very close to the Civil Government, after which the policemen joined the rebels. It so happened that from Jaén a group of six Republicans had arrived at the police station with an order for dynamite to be delivered to them, after which they went on to load it onto a truck. Shortly after the arrival of Nestares, realizing what was happening, the Republicans began to fire on the rebels until they were finally captured. (Note: According to Ian Gibson, these detainees were among the first republicans shot, being executed at dawn on July 26. —Gibson (1981, p. 96))

The rebels then launched themselves at the civilian government. A section of artillery soldiers under the command of Captain García Moreno and Falangists under the command of Major Valdés were positioned in front of the entrance to the building. In turn, Nestares and other forces arrived from the police station on Duquesa Street. The assault guards, perhaps seeing themselves outnumbered, did not fire and the rebels were able to occupy the building without difficulty. After entering the office of the civil governor, the military and assault guards took prisoner Torres Martínez, Virgilio Castilla Carmona (president of the Diputación), Rus Romero and the head of the Civil Guard command, Lieutenant Colonel Vidal Pagán. With the exception of Castilla—who pulled out a pistol and was quickly arrested—no one offered resistance. The detainees were taken to the nearby police station, with the exception of Torres Martínez, who remained held in the civil government building.

While this was happening in the Civil Government, the urban police of Granada left the city hall towards the Plaza del Carmen, placing themselves at the orders of the battery that had been installed there. Several republicans and municipal officials managed to escape from the town hall through a back door, but a good part of the municipal corporation was captured when the rebels occupied the building. Also taken prisoner was the mayor Manuel Fernández Montesinos, (Note: Lieutenant Colonel Miguel del Campo Robles took over as mayor of Granada. —Reig Tapia (1983, p. 728)) when he was in his office For its part, a group of military under the command of Major Rosaleny went to the Radio Granada building, at number 27 Gran Vía, and occupied it without difficulty. At 18:30 Commander Rosaleny read the military bando signed by Campins, and from then on every half hour the military bando was read over the radio.

An armed group of military men headed towards the Gunpowder and Explosives Factory of El Fargue, located on the outskirts of Granada, on the road to Murcia. The importance of this action lay in the fact that El Fargue was the largest explosives factory in the south of the country. Upon arriving there the rebels met resistance, although they were able to crush it easily and take control of the factory.

Other pockets of resistance in the city were put down without too much difficulty. Within a short time all the official centers had been taken. Such an easy conquest was due to the fact that the crowds and supporters of the Popular Front had hardly any weapons and were scattered. In fact, proof of this was that during the conquest of the city the rebels had only one dead, a soldier shot down. Many workers and Republic loyalists fled to the Albaicín neighborhood, where there was serious resistance.

=== Armilla Aerodrome ===
The Armilla Airbase, located several kilometers from Granada, was occupied at dawn by a group of artillery soldiers and officers, without encountering resistance. One of those who occupied the airfield was the pilot Narciso Bermúdez de Castro, who would later found the famous Patrulla Azul (Spanish: "Blue Patrol"). Shortly after, coming from Madrid, three Nieuport-Delage NiD 52 fighters sent to support the resistance of the loyalist forces in Granada arrived in Armilla, but were immediately captured.

=== Combats in the Albaicín ===
Despite their plans, the rebels had not succeeded in gaining immediate control of the entire city. At nightfall resistance still continued in the Albaicín neighborhood, where workers and those loyal to the Republic were concentrated. These erected barricades at the access points of the neighborhood, especially the Carrera del Darro; at the beginning of the Cuesta del Chapiz the workers opened a deep trench. The military rebels, seeing these movements and coinciding with the fact that it was getting dark, understood that they could not take the Albaicín by assault. They had to bring artillery. They placed an artillery battery at the entrance of the Church of San Cristobal, at a point from where the city was dominated, while another battery was placed in the Alhambra, in front of the Albaicín. Before the end of the day, there were some shootouts between the defenders and the rebels that left at least two dead among the military rebels, and possibly a few others among the Republicans.

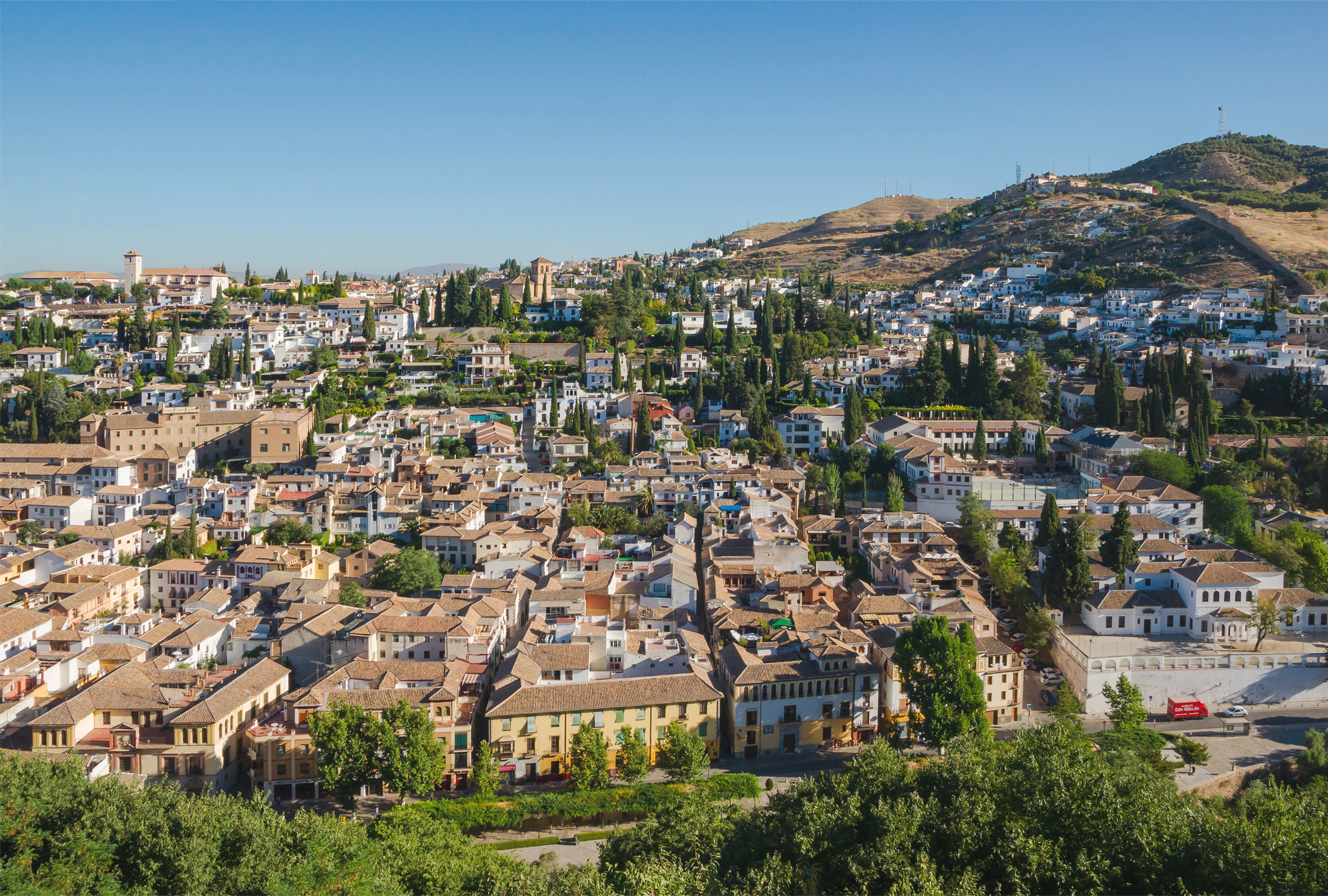
Albaicín and Sacromonte neighborhood, seen from the Alhambra.

On the morning of July 21, the batteries opened fire on the Albaicín, while a heavy firefight broke out between both sides; the defenders, despite having very few weapons and ammunition, defended themselves from balconies and rooftops. The rebels had concentrated forces of infantry, Assault Guards and Falangists in order to quell the Republican resistance. Throughout the day some breaches were made in the Republican resistance and several defenders were captured, but when night fell the neighborhood still continued to resist. For its part, the radio repeatedly exhorted the defenders to lay down their arms.

On the morning of 22 July, Radio Granada announced an ultimatum to the defenders: three hours would be granted for the women and children to leave the neighborhood and concentrate at various indicated points, while the men were to abandon their weapons and remain in their homes with their arms raised, and white flags were to fly from the balconies; if these orders were not complied with, the artillery would again open fire starting at 2:30 pm. Rows of women and children began to descend from the Albaicín, but this was not the case with the men, who continued to resist. The women were searched by female sympathizers of the rebels and, after being interrogated, were sent to a concentration camp that had been set up on the outskirts of the city. Shortly afterwards the artillery pieces again opened fire. The harassment of the Albaicín workers was joined by NiD 52 fighters that had been captured in Armilla, which made several passes over the neighborhood, strafing the defenders Several houses were destroyed and the workers had numerous casualties, but resistance continued after dark.

On the morning of July 23 the bombardment on the Albaicín intensified. By then the Republican workers and/or militiamen had suffered a high number of casualties. It is likely that the defenders' ammunition had already been exhausted. At the same time, white flags began to appear hanging from balconies and windows, a situation that the rebels took advantage of to start entering en masse inside Albaicín. In a short time, they managed to put an end to the resistance in Albaicín. Numerous defenders were taken prisoner while attempting to flee, while others were captured in their own dwellings. A number of defenders managed to escape from Albaicín and reach the Republican lines near Guadix. Repression against the Republicans and the left was then unleashed.

By nightfall on July 23, the rebels already controlled all of Granada and the surrounding area.

== Consequences ==
=== Strategic impact ===
By July 25, the uprising had triumphed in Granada and surrounding towns, but these found themselves isolated in the middle of the Republican zone, since most of the province remained loyal to the Republic. This isolation became even more evident after the failure of the military rebellion in Málaga, which finally went for the Republic. During the first days of the conflict the front line passed through Güéjar Sierra, Sierra Nevada, Órgiva, La Malahá, Santa Fe, Láchar, Íllora, Cogollos Vega, Huétor Santillán, Beas, Dúdar and Quéntar. At some points the Republicans were only eight kilometers from the urban centre.

During the first days the government forces carried out several aerial bombardments over the city. On July 30, a column of militiamen tried to recapture it by attacking through the Huétor Santillán sector, but the Republicans were repulsed by forces under the command of Major Villalba and Lieutenant Pelayo; the militiamen withdrew leaving behind a good number of dead and a large amount of armament. That was the only considerable Republican attempt to regain the city. The isolation ended when in mid-August the African forces commanded by General Varela managed to link Granada with the rest of the revolted area.

Despite being under siege, the rebels had several advantages. The capture of the El Fargue factory was very important, since during the rest of the conflict the factory produced a large quantity of explosives for the rebel army. For its part, the capture of the Armilla aerodrome was also very important, since it would allow to maintain contact with the other rebel zones—especially with Seville—as well as the reception of reinforcements by air.

=== Repression ===
Commander José Valdés Guzmán became the civil governor and responsible for Public Order issues, being from that moment the main responsible for the repression in the capital of Granada. Civil Guard lieutenant José Nestares became delegate of Public Order, assuming a prominent role in the repression. Police chief Julio Romero Funes, (Note: Years after the end of the war, Romero Funes was killed in a shootout with anti-Francoist guerrillas. —Aróstegui & Marco (2008, p. 162)) was also another of the main perpetrators of the repression.

Several paramilitary groups and/or militias in charge of repression in the rear were created, among which the Escuadra Negra (Spanish: "Black Squadron") was especially prominent. Numerous compounds were set up as improvised detention centers. A concentration camp was set up on the outskirts of the city, while the Police Station and the Civil Government were soon crowded with detainees. The Granada prison, which had a capacity for about 400 people, saw its facilities overcrowded with more than 2,000 people imprisoned. Many of the detainees were taken to the cemetery and shot there, most of them without prior formation of a cause. The month with the most executions was August 1936, with 572 executed. During the entire conflict, some 5,000 people were executed. (Note: In his first work, Ian Gibson gave an estimate of 25,000 people shot on the basis of a source who claimed to have access to the documentation of the Audiencia of Granada. —Gibson (1973, p. 167))

Numerous doctors, lawyers, writers, artists, artists, teachers and, mainly, workers were shot. Among those executed were many local personalities: writer and editor of the newspaper El Defensor de Granada, Constantino Ruiz Carnero; the engineer and builder of the road from the city to Sierra Nevada, Juan José de Santa Cruz; or the mayor of the city when the military uprising took place, Manuel Fernández Montesinos. Along with the mayor, 23 councilmen of the republican-socialist coalition were shot, of which the former mayor Luis Fajardo Fernández stood out. This fate also befell Rus Romero and the president of the deputation, Virgilio Castilla. The University of Granada also suffered the bloodletting of the "rebel" repression. The university rector and eminent Arabist Salvador Vila Hernández; (Note: Vila's wife, who was a German Jew, was on the verge of being murdered, although she finally managed to save her life through the mediation of the renowned musician Manuel de Falla. But this came at a price: in exchange for keeping her life she was forced to convert to Catholicism. Her parents, on the other hand, suffered a worse fate: they were deported to Nazi Germany. —Preston (2013, p. 249)) professor of pediatrics Rafael García-Duarte; professor of chemistry and former mayor Jesús Yoldi Bereau; the professor of political law Joaquín García Labella; or the vice-rector and professor of history José Palanco Romero. All of them passed through the cemetery walls and were shot. However, there was one exception: that of the former civil governor, Torres Martínez, who managed to save his life, although he was sentenced to more than thirty years in prison.

The military commander, General Campins, was dismissed and later sent to Seville, where he would be tried and shot at the initiative of General Queipo de Llano.

Among all these deaths, the best known has been that of the writer and poet Federico García Lorca, who after the triumph of the military uprising had taken refuge in the house of the Rosales family, recognized members of the Granada Falange. However, this did not save the life of the Granadian poet, who was arrested and shortly afterwards shot near Víznar. The assassination of García Lorca was widely echoed by international public opinion. Although the harshness of the repression was well known, many members of the bourgeoisie in Granada tolerated these crimes as "seeming less serious than those—it was said—were being committed in republican Spain."

== Bibliography ==
- Aguado Sánchez, Francisco (1975). El maquis en España. Su Historia. Madrid: Editorial San Martín.
- Álvarez Rey, Leandro (2010). Los Diputados por Andalucía de la Segunda República, 1931-1939: Diccionario biográfico Tomo II. Centro de Estudios Andaluces. ISBN 9788493785505.
- Aróstegui, Julio (2006). Por qué el 18 de julio… Y después. Barcelona: Flor del Viento Ediciones. ISBN 84-96495-13-2.
- Aróstegui, Julio; Marco, Jorge (2008). El último frente: la resistencia armada antifranquista en España, 1939-1952. Madrid: Los Libros de la Catarata.
- Cabanellas, Guillermo (1975). La guerra de los mil días: nacimiento, vida y muerte de la II República Española. Buenos Aires: Heliasta.
- Claret Miranda, Jaume (2006). El atroz desmoche: la destrucción de la universidad española por el franquismo, 1936-1945. Barcelona: Editorial Crítica. ISBN 978-84-8432-760-8.
- Entrala, José Luis (1996). Granada sitiada, 1936-1939. Granada: Editorial Comares. ISBN 9788481512922.
- Gibson, Ian (1973). The Death of Lorca. Chicago: J. Philip O'Hara. ISBN 9780879553067.
- Gibson, Ian (1981). El Asesinato de Federico García Lorca. Barcelona: Editorial Bruguera.
- Jackson, Gabriel (2005). La República Española y la Guerra Civil. RBA Coleccionables. ISBN 84-473-3633-6.
- Reig Tapia, Alberto (1983). La represión franquista y la guerra civil: consideraciones metodológicas, instrumentalización política y justificación ideológica. Volumen 2. Universidad Complutense de Madrid.
- Pérez Grange, Carlos; Pecker, Beatriz (1998). Crónica de la Aviación Española. Sílex. ISBN 8477370664.
- Preston, Paul (2013). El Holocausto Español. Odio y Exterminio en la Guerra Civil y después. Barcelona: Debolsillo.
- Ruiz Sánchez, José-Leonardo (2005). Catolicismo y comunicación en la historia contemporánea. Universidad de Sevilla.
- Salas, Nicolás (1992). Sevilla fue la clave: república, alzamiento, Guerra Civil (1931-1939). Castillejo. ISBN 8480580003.
- Solé i Sabaté, Josep Maria; Villarroya, Joan (2003). España en llamas. La guerra civil desde el aire. Madrid: Temas de Hoy. ISBN 84-8460-302-4.
- Thomas, Hugh (1976). Historia de la Guerra Civil Española. Barcelona: Círculo de Lectores. ISBN 84-226-0874-X.
