= Puerta del Vado =

Coordinates: 39.8627°N 4.0215°W

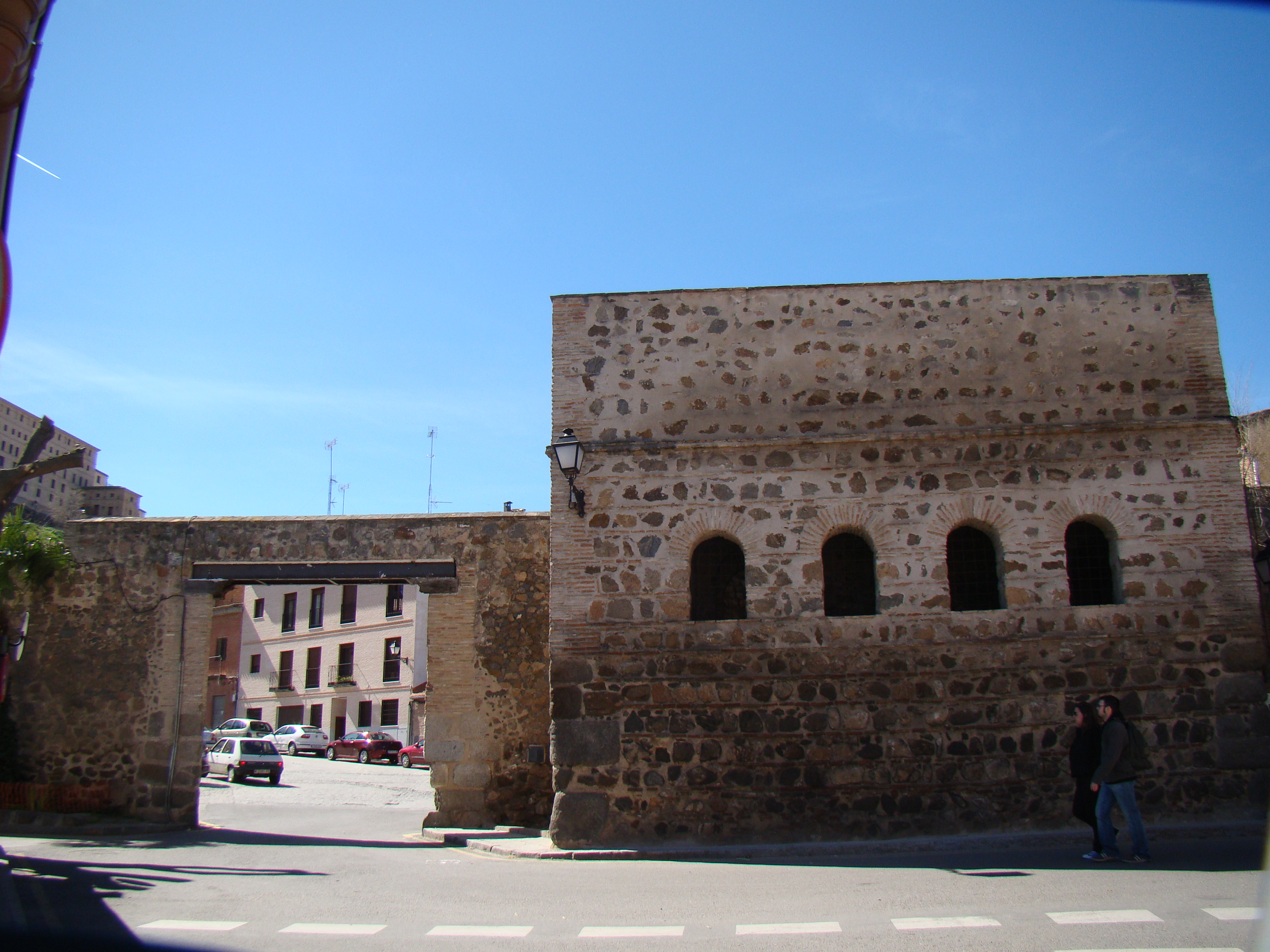
Puerta del Vado

The Puerta del Vado is a city gate built between the late-11th and early-12th centuries and located in the neighborhood of Antequeruela in the city of Toledo, (Castile-La Mancha, Spain). This district was known before and after the reconquest of the city of Toledo like the arrabal of San Isidoro, an area of important potter tradition.

This gate, due to its location, in the natural departure of the trough that articulates the mentioned neighborhood of the Antequeruela, and being the place where waste was thrown from the nearby pots, it was gradually covered by materials and sediments; Thus, in the late 15th and early 16th century, a series of remodelings took place such as the elevation of its pavement more than one meter above the original.

In spite of that renovations, from the 17th century the Puerta del Vado was falling in disuse; being definitively abandoned at the end of this century and leaving only the upper part in sight.

The Puerta del Vado is very similar, both in its typology and its proportions, but covered, to the Puerta de Bisagra Vieja. The part of the gate that is now visible from street corresponds to its upper body.
