= Hilda Kogan =

Argentine judge (born 1945)

Judge of the Supreme Court of Justice of Buenos Aires
- Incumbent
- Assumed office 2002

Personal details
- Born: 4 February 1945 (age 81)
- Education: University of Buenos Aires; University of North Carolina

Hilda Kogan (born 4 February 1945) is an Argentine judge, lawyer and professor. In 2002 she became the first woman judge of the Supreme Court of Justice of Buenos Aires, and was its first woman president between 2010 and 2011, between 2017 and 2018, between 2022 and 2023, and between 2025 and 2026.

== Early life ==
Kogan was born on 4 February 1945. She obtained a degree from the University of Buenos Aires, where she also earned a doctorate. She undertook postgraduate studies at the University of North Carolina.

== Career ==
Until 1976, Kogan was a research fellow and lecturer at the Bariloche Foundation, and subsequently practised as a labour lawyer and trade union adviser. From 1985 onwards, she was a lecturer at the University of Buenos Aires. She entered the judiciary in 1996, serving as a labour court judge and a federal social security judge.

In 2002, she became the first and only female justice of the Supreme Court of Justice of Buenos Aires following an agreement with the Civic Radical Union during Felipe Solá’s administration. She also chaired the Judicial Council and the Electoral Board of the Province of Buenos Aires. She served as its president between 2010 and 2011, between 2017 and 2018, between 2022 and 2023, and between 2025 and 2026.

During Néstor Kirchner’s presidency, there was speculation that Kogan would be appointed a judge of the Supreme Court of Argentina, but Elena Highton de Nolasco was appointed instead.

In July 2020, she was part of the group of legal experts that President Alberto Fernández called upon to discuss judicial reform.

== Awards ==
- Konex Award (2018)
