= Puerto =

Puerto, a Spanish word meaning seaport or mountain pass, may refer to:

== Places ==
- El Puerto de Santa María, Andalusia, Spain
- Puerto, a seaport town in Cagayan de Oro, Philippines
- Puerto Colombia, Colombia
- Puerto Cumarebo, Venezuela
- Puerto Galera, Oriental Mindoro, Philippines
- Puerto La Cruz, Venezuela
- Puerto Píritu, Venezuela
- Puerto Princesa, Palawan, Philippines
- Puerto Rico, an unincorporated territory of the United States
- Puerto del Suspiro del Moro (Pass of the Moor's Sigh), Sierra Nevada, Spain
- Puerto Vallarta, Mexico

== Others ==
- Milton Jesús Puerto (born 1969), Honduran politician
- Puerto Rico (board game)
- Operación Puerto doping case

== See also ==
- Puerta (disambiguation)
