= Puerta Real =

Puerta Real may refer to two places in Spain:

- Puerta Real (Granada), historic, central area of the city of Granada
- Puerta Real (Seville), an ancient gate of the city of Seville

== See also ==
- Puerto Real, a seaport in Andalusia
