= Guillermo Cabanellas =

Spanish labor lawyer, historian, and lexicographer (1911–1983)

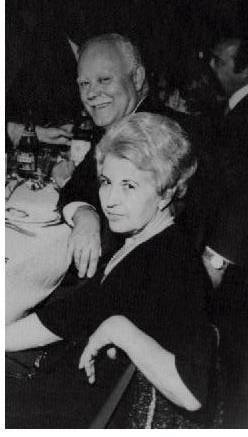
- Guillermo Cabanellas and Carmen de las Cuevas (1976)
- Born: June 25, 1911; Melilla, Spain
- Died: April 13, 1983 (aged 71); Buenos Aires, Argentina
- Education: University of Salamanca Central University of Madrid National University of Asunción
- Occupations: Lawyer and historian
- Employer: University of Buenos Aires
- Father: Miguel Cabanellas
- Relatives: María del Carmen Cabanellas Lacal, Ana María, and Guillermo Cabanellas de las Cuevas (children)

Guillermo Cabanellas de Torres (Melilla, 25 June 1911–Buenos Aires, 13 April 1983) was a Spanish historian, labor lawyer, publisher, and lexicographer who carried out his work in Spain, Paraguay, and Argentina.

== Biography ==
=== Early life ===
At the time of his birth in Melilla, his father, Cavalry Commander Miguel Cabanellas Ferrer, was organizing the first Indigenous Regular Forces in Spanish Morocco.

Cabanellas de Torres obtained a law degree from the University of Salamanca at the age of 19 and a doctorate in law from the Central University of Madrid.

=== Political Activity in Spain ===
He served as president of the Professional Association of Law Students of Madrid; was a leader of the University School Federation, a founding member of the Federal Union of Hispanic Students and of the International Federation of Law Students; and served as delegate for Spain in the congress of the International Confederation of Students in Brussels in 1930.

He took part in the failed Jaca uprising against Dámaso Berenguer's dictatorship and in the people's movements that led to the proclamation of the Second Spanish Republic on 14 April 1931.

During the republican government, he held the positions of secretary of the General Government of Spanish Guinea, secretary of the National Mixed Jury of Telephones, and legal secretary of the Maritime Delegation of Murcia Province. Likewise, he practiced the legal profession in Madrid and in Ciudad Real. In 1936, he ran as candidate for deputy for the Spanish Socialist Workers’ Party.

He married Carmen de las Cuevas in Madrid on 16 July 1936. Two days later, when a part of the army rose up in arms against the Republican Government, he was in Zaragoza where his father, General Cabanellas Ferrer, joined the movement and seized power in that city. This circumstance meant that both Guillermo and Carmen had to remain in the area controlled by the rebels.

The National Defense Junta was formed on 24 July and General Cabanellas Ferrer took office as its president. This did not prevent the supporters of the rebellion from persecuting and making threats against his son, which got worse when General Francisco Franco became head of state on 1 October 1936. As he felt that his life was in danger, Cabanellas de Torres fled with Carmen to France at the beginning of May 1937 and from there they traveled to Montevideo, Uruguay, where they lived for six months.

=== Life in Paraguay ===
In 1938, Cabanellas de Torres moved with his wife to Asunción, Paraguay. He joined the editorial staff of El País and became its editor-in-chief in January 1940. He held the same position at La Razón. He collaborated with newspapers and magazines in Paraguay and in the Argentine magazines Aquí Está and Leoplán. He was a permanent contributor to La Mañana in Montevideo.

He once again studied law at the Law School of the National University of Asunción in Paraguay, where he also obtained a Doctorate in Law and Social Sciences. His doctoral thesis: El Derecho del Trabajo y sus contratos (Labor Law and its Contracts), consolidated his specialization in that branch of law that was in the process of formation.

=== Life in Argentina ===
In 1944, he settled in Buenos Aires, Argentina, revalidated the university degrees he had obtained in Paraguay, and began to practice as a lawyer specializing in labor matters, representing both workers and employers, a practice he continued until his death.

=== University Faculty ===
In 1960, he was appointed as a tenured professor, by competitive examination, at the Faculty of Economic Sciences of the University of Buenos Aires, where he succeeded Alfredo Lorenzo Palacios, a socialist lawyer, as head of the departments of Labor and Social Policy (1962–1970) and Labor Law (1960–1970). He also served as tenured professor of Labor Law at the University of the Savior in Buenos Aires, and as professor emeritus and dean of the Labor Department at the John F. Kennedy Argentine University in Buenos Aires.

Cabanellas was also appointed to positions outside of Argentina, as associate professor of Labor Law at the University of San Francisco Xavier in Chuquisaca, Bolivia; the Central University of Ecuador; and the Autonomous University of Santo Domingo, Dominican Republic. He also served as professor emeritus at the Mother and Teacher Pontifical Catholic University in Santiago de los Caballeros and the Pedro Henríquez Ureña National University in Santo Domingo (Dominican Republic); the University of San Martín de Porres in Lima (Peru); the Saint Mary's Catholic University in Arequipa (Peru); and the Saint Mary University in Caracas (Venezuela).

=== Practice as a Labor Lawyer ===
He served as substitute judge at the Supreme Court of Justice of Buenos Aires (Argentina) for several terms and was a member of the board of directors of the Gaceta del Trabajo (Labor Gazette) trade publication on labor law.

He organized and took part in numerous conferences, courses, and seminars on labor law in Argentina and abroad.

He was a founding member of the Argentine Association of Labor Law and Social Security in 1957 and of the Ibero-American Association of Labor Law in 1975.

Today, an association of experts from all over Ibero-America is named after him, dedicated to the research, study, and dissemination of the disciplines of labor law and social security.

=== Publisher and Writer ===
Cabanellas de Torres developed most of his work in Argentina. He founded the Editorial Heliasta publishing house and later acquired the prestigious Editorial Claridad.

He wrote the Tratado de Derecho Laboral (Treatise on Labor Law) in four volumes, which he later expanded to ten volumes in its second edition. He had found that, in some Latin American countries, it was difficult to publish books on legal topics referring to local legislation, as the demand was not enough to justify it. Thus, in this treatise, Cabanellas did not limit himself to Argentine law but also included the comparative legislation of Latin American countries, which is one of the reasons why this work is so widespread and influential in the region. Another one of his works that is frequently cited is the Diccionario enciclopédico de derecho usual (Encyclopedic Dictionary of Common Law), the twenty-fifth edition of which was published in 2003.

=== His Ideas ===
Guillermo Cabanellas de Torres identified with the Spanish Republican movement. In Argentina, he resumed his friendship with republican personalities such as Leandro Pita Romero and Niceto Alcalá Zamora, the first president of the Second Spanish Republic.

Cabanellas de Torres combined his knowledge of the theory of law with the practical experience of his personal practice as a lawyer. Perhaps for this reason he insisted on the importance of the administrative and judicial bodies responsible for the application of laws in the region, since if they were not effective due to corruption or lack of means, it would be useless to enact legislation that would broadly protect the rights of workers. He never refrained from expressing these opinions, even if this caused him to be criticized or resisted. He claimed that Argentine trade union legislation, in terms of the preferences it granted to unions that had the status of a legally recognized union (still in force in 2015) violated Convention No. 87 of the International Labor Organization and that the absence of a democratic trade union system favored corruption, led unions to deviate from their specific purposes, and ultimately and directly harmed workers.

=== Work as Historian ===
During his stay in Paraguay, Cabanellas de Torres wrote a biography of Dr. José Gaspar Rodríguez de Francia, dictator of that country and, in Argentina, he wrote two books on the Spanish Civil War: La guerra de los mil días (The Thousand Days' War) and Cuatro generales (Four Generals), both in two volumes, considered by the author himself as the “work of a protagonist or of someone who has been too close to the tragedy to approach it with the serenity required of a researcher or with the meticulous details that it calls for.”

=== Death ===
Guillermo Cabanellas de Torres died in Buenos Aires while the Eighth Ibero-American Congress and the Seventh National Congress on Labor Law and Social Security, of which he was vice-president, was in full swing. He and his wife Carmen de las Cuevas had two children, both lawyers: Ana María Cabanellas de las Cuevas, who went on to manage the publishing houses, and Guillermo Cabanellas de las Cuevas, author of several legal works. He also had a daughter from his relationship with Cristina Lacal Duvos, named María del Carmen, born on 14 July 1936.

== List of Works ==
He wrote the following works:

- ¡Esclavos! (Notas sobre el África Negra). Valencia: Ediciones Cuadernos de Cultura. 1933.
- La revolución social. Madrid: Ediciones Índice. 1933.
- Enjuiciamiento en los Jurados Mixtos. Madrid: Editorial Castro. 1933.
- Militarismo, Militaradas. Acotaciones sobre la historia político-militar de España. Madrid: Editorial Castro. 1934.
- Aborto médico-jurídico-social. Valencia: Ediciones Orto. 1934. (co-authored with Emilio Cabanellas) OCLC: 431312856
- Defensa ante el Consejo de Guerra. Ciudad Real: Author's edition. 1935.
- El instinto y el sexo. Madrid: Editorial Castro. 1936. (co-authored with Emilio Cabanellas)
- Los caminos y los pueblos. Asunción: Edition by the Press and Propaganda Office of the Ministry of Government and Labor of Paraguay. 1940.
- La selva siempre triunfa. Buenos Aires: Editorial Ayacucho. 1944. (under the pen name of William C. Towers)
- El dictador del Paraguay, Dr. Francia. Buenos Aires: Editorial Claridad. 1944.
- El Derecho del Trabajo y sus contratos. Buenos Aires: Editorial Mundo Atlántico. 1945.
- Los fundamentos del Nuevo Derecho. Buenos Aires: Editorial Americalee. 1945.
- Proa al exilio. Buenos Aires: Editorial Atalaya. 1945.
- Diccionario de Derecho Usual. Buenos Aires: Editorial Atalaya. 1946.
- Derecho Constitucional Laboral. Madrid: Editorial Tecnos. 1958. (co-authored with Eugenio Pérez Botija)
- Repertorio jurídico de locuciones, máximas y aforismos latinos y castellanos. Buenos Aires: Bibliográfica Omeba. 1959.
- Tratado de Derecho Laboral (10 vols., 2nd. edition). Buenos Aires: Bibliográfica Omeba. 1963. ISBN 978-950-906-556-7.
- Diccionario militar. Aeronáutico, naval y terrestre. Buenos Aires: Bibliográfica Omeba. 1963. ISBN 950-620-000-9.
- Compendio de Derecho Laboral. Buenos Aires: Bibliográfica Omeba. 1968.
- La guerra de los mil días. Buenos Aires: Editorial Grijalbo. 1973.
- El confín de la esperanza. Buenos Aires: Editorial Heliasta. 1975.
- Cuatro generales. Barcelona: Editorial Planeta, Espejo de España collection. 1977.
- La Guerra Civil y la victoria. Madrid: Editorial Tebas. 1978.
- Diccionario de Derecho Laboral. Buenos Aires: Editorial Heliasta. 1999. ISBN 950-885-024-8.
- Repertorio jurídico. Principios generales del derecho, locuciones, máximas y aforismos latinos y castellanos (4th edition). Buenos Aires: Editorial Heliasta. 2003. ISBN 950-9065-87-0.
- Diccionario enciclopédico de derecho usual (8 volumes) (25th edition). Buenos Aires: Editorial Heliasta. 2003. ISBN 978-950-9065-65-9.
- Diccionario jurídico elemental (18th edition). Buenos Aires: Editorial Heliasta. 2006. ISBN 978-950-885-058-4.
- Tratado de política laboral y social (3 volumes) (2nd edition). Buenos Aires: Editorial Heliasta. 2006. ISBN 950-9065-18-8.

== Bibliography ==
- Centurión, Carlos R. (1951). Historia de las letras paraguayas, vol. III (Época autonómica). Buenos Aires: Editorial Ayacucho.

== See also ==
- Miguel Cabanellas
- Francisco Franco
- July 1936 military uprising in Barcelona
- July 1936 coup d'état in Granada
- Siege of the Montaña barracks
- Jaca uprising
- Dictablanda of Dámaso Berenguer
