= Alonso de Covarrubias =

Spanish Architect

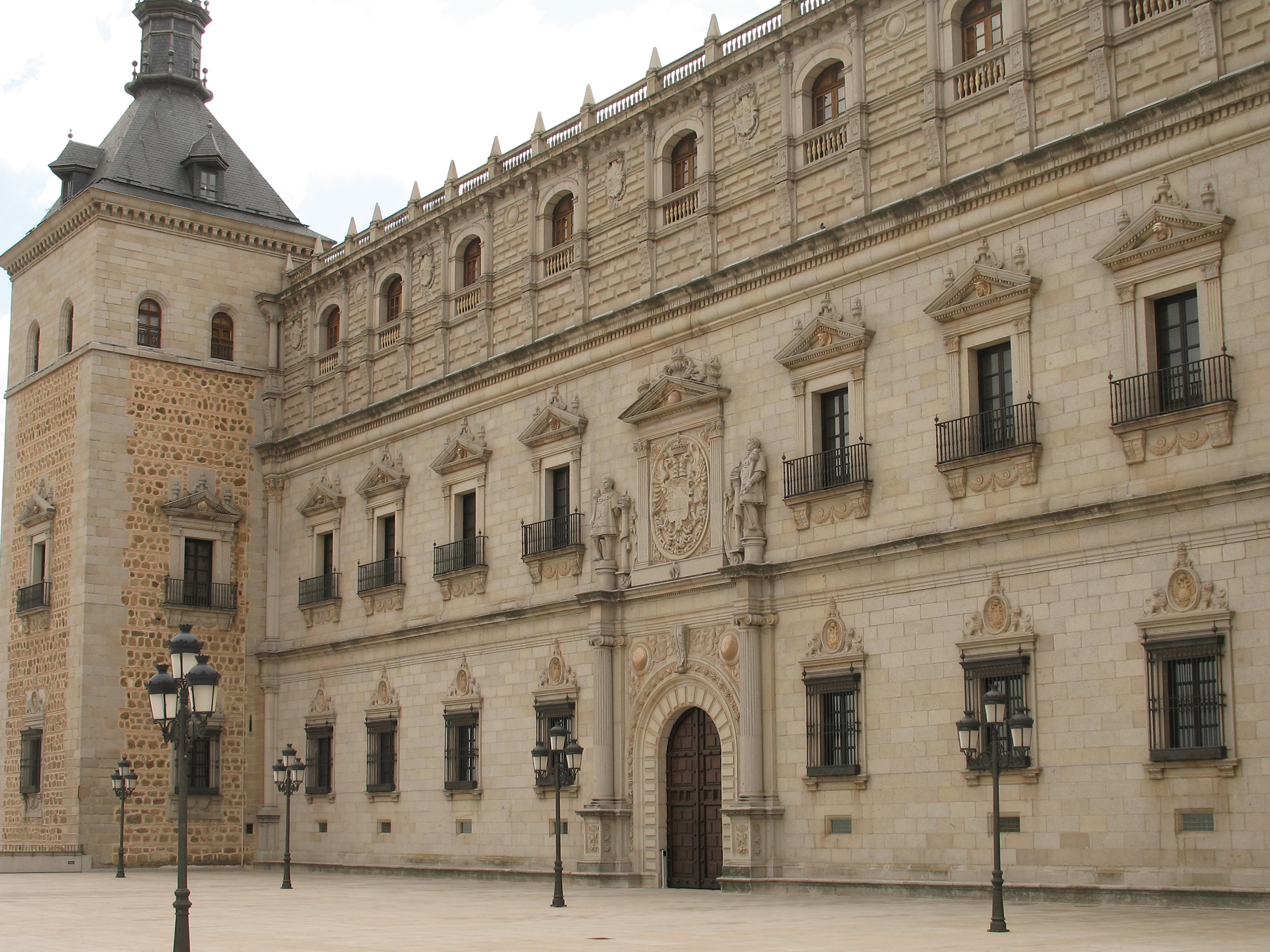
- Alcázar of Toledo. Main façade.
- Born: Alonso de Covarrubias; 1488; Torrijos, Spain
- Died: 1570 (aged 82); Toledo
- Known for: Architecture, Sculpture
- Notable work: Tavera Hospital; Toledo Cathedral; Alcázar of Toledo Castillo de Canales Recas
- Movement: Plateresque, Spanish Renaissance

Alonso de Covarrubias (Torrijos, Toledo 1488–1570) was a Spanish architect and sculptor of the Renaissance, active mainly in Toledo.

== Works ==
Covarrubias' works include:

His first work was associated with Antón Egas and Juan Guas, in a style the transition between late gothic and Plateresque. In the first years of his career he worked principally as a sculptor.

First works as architect:

- At Sigüenza Cathedral, he is credited with designing the retables of Saint Librada and Fadrique de Portugal, influenced by Francisco de Baeza (1515).
- In the Hospital de Santa Cruz (Toledo): the courtyard and the plateresque stairway.
- In 1532 worked in the sacristy of Sigüenza Cathedral.

In Toledo:

- In 1534 he was named superintendent of the building program at Toledo Cathedral where he planned the New Kings chapel.
- In 1537 Covarrubias and Luis de Vega were named architects of the Alcázar. Covarrubias built the main façade and the courtyard.
- (1541- ) Designed and built the Tavera Hospital (Hospital de Tavera), one of his principal buildings.
- 154_ The façade of Episcopal palace of Toledo
- Rebuilt the Puerta de Bisagra Nueva.

Other important Works:

- In the 1530s built the cloister of the Lupiana Monastery.
- He also worked in the Archbishop's Palace of Alcalá de Henares where he built the façade and the lost courtyard.

== Gallery ==
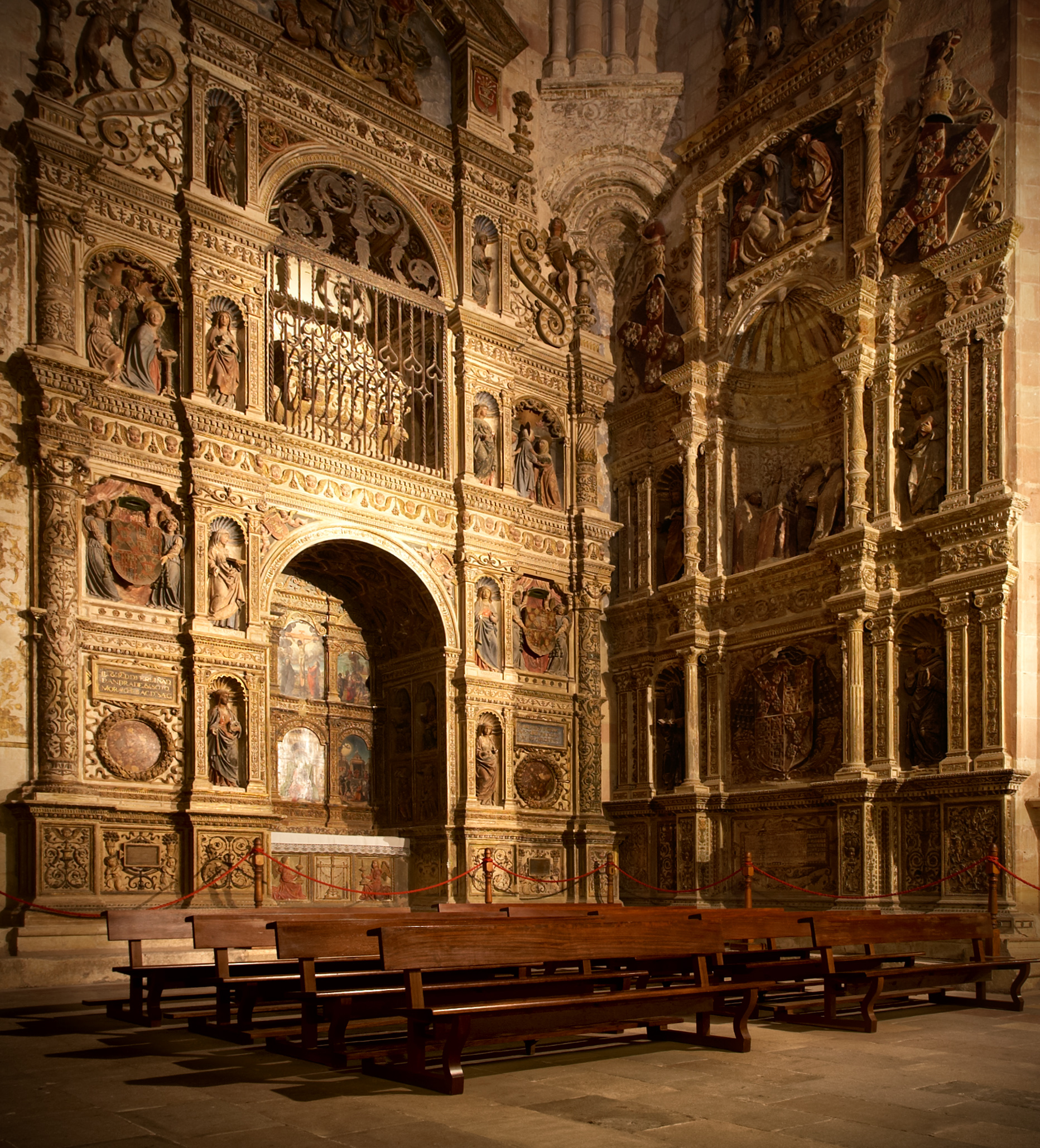
Retables of Santa Librada and Fadrique de Portugal. Sigüenza Cathedral.

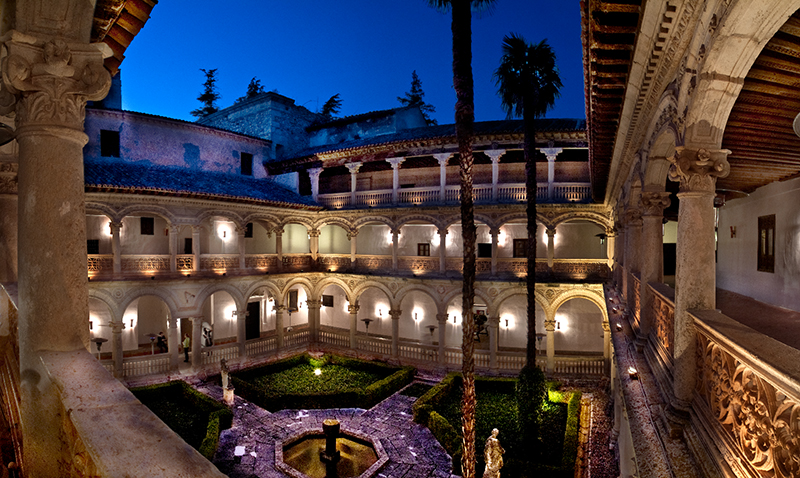
Lupiana monastery. Cloister.

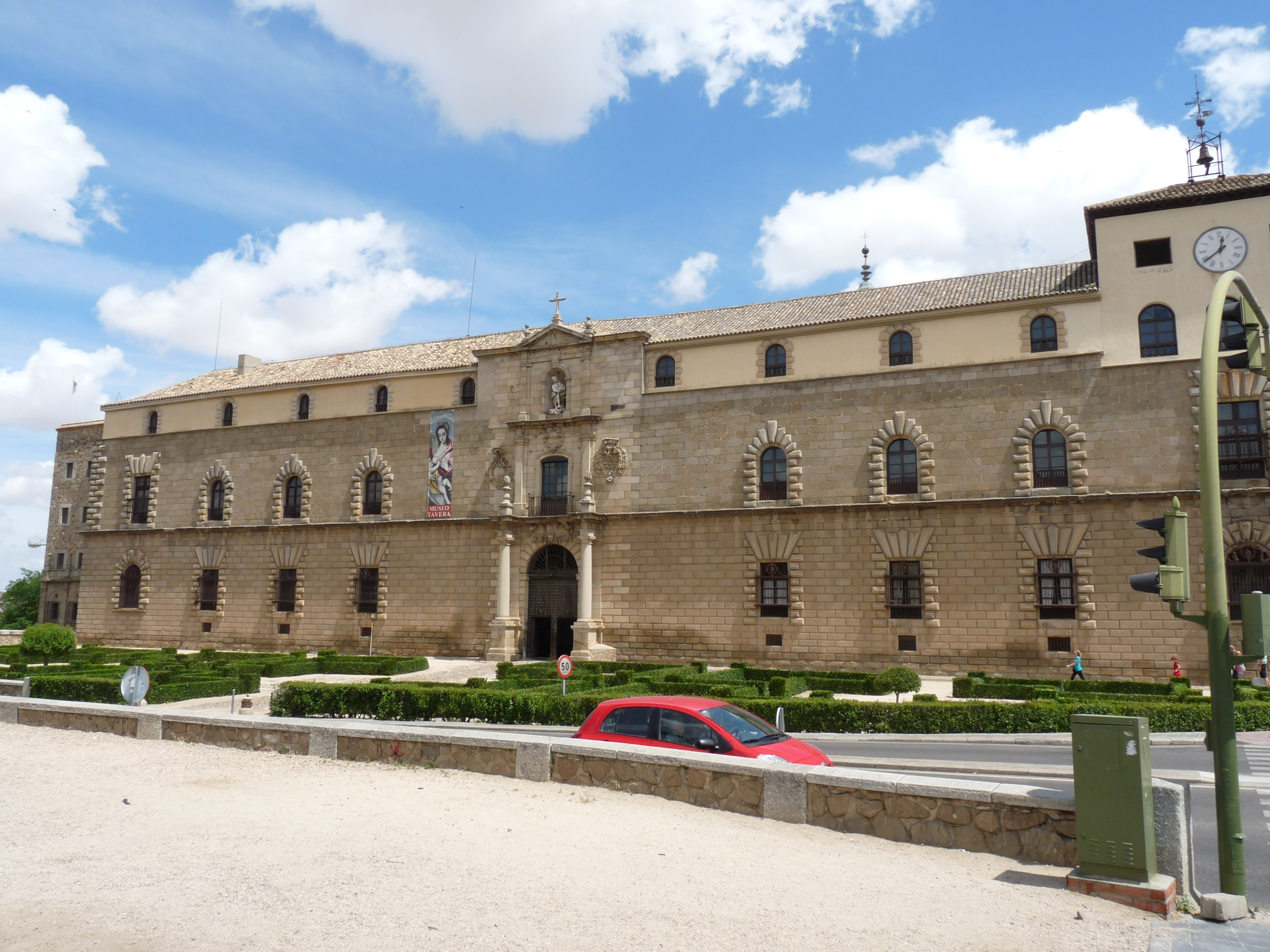
Toledo – Hospital Tavera. Toledo.

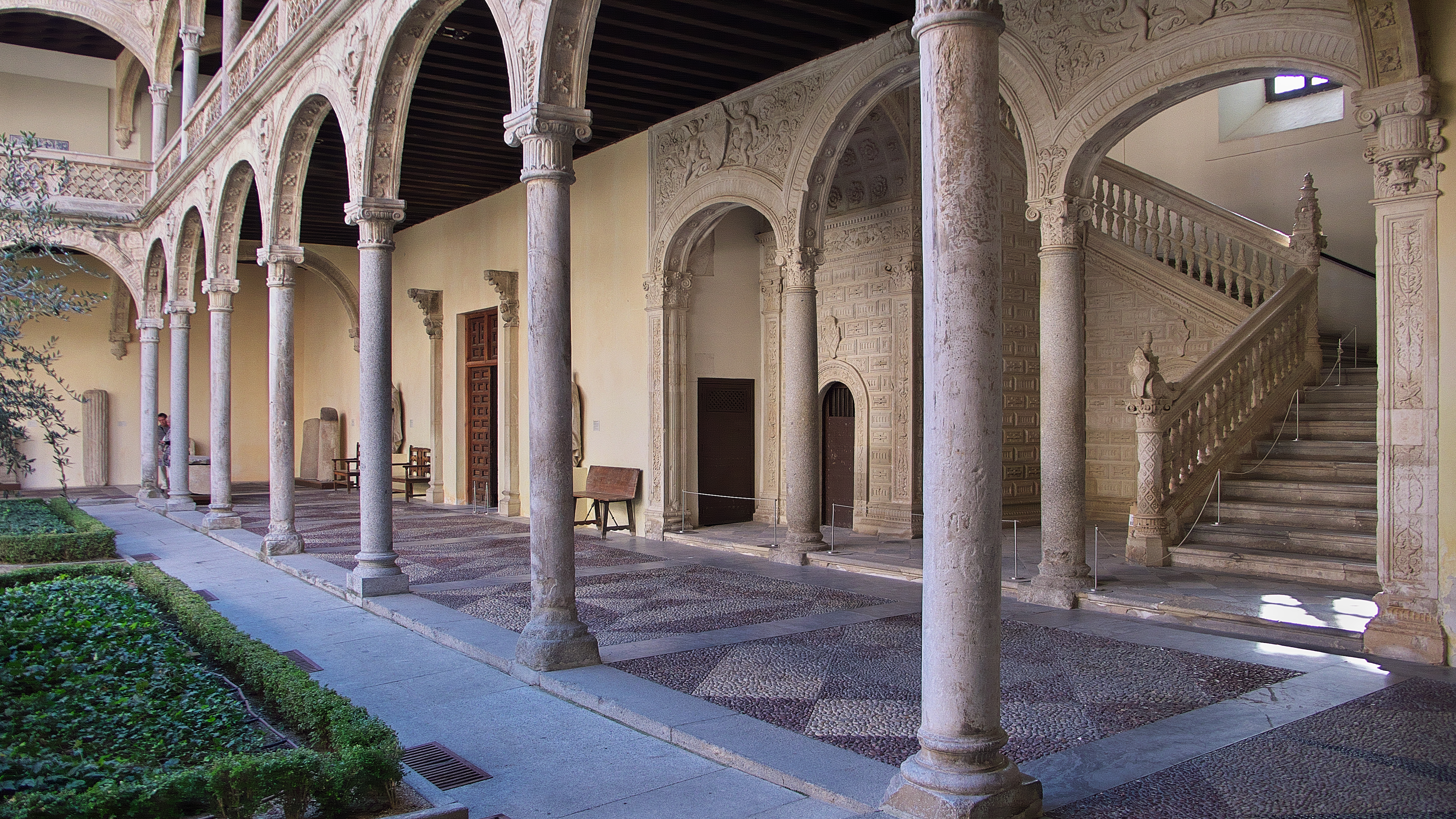
Hospital of the Holly Cross. Toledo.

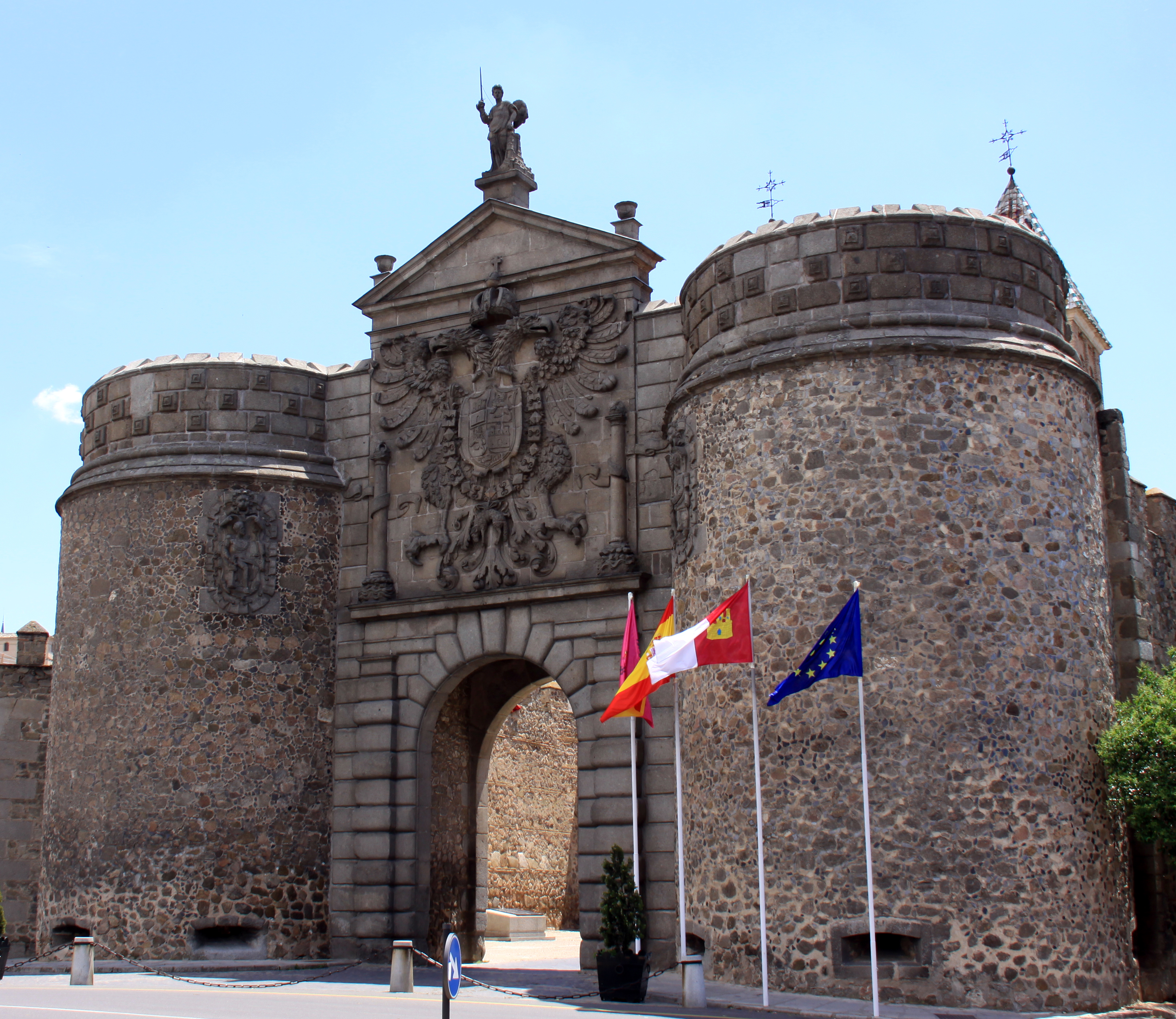
Puerta Bisagra. Toledo. New Bisagra gate.

== Sources ==
- José Camón Aznar (1973). Arquitectura y orfebrería españolas del siglo XVI. Espasa-Calpe. ISBN 978-84-239-5217-5.
- Bertrand Jestaz (1995). The art of the Renaissance. Abrams. ISBN 978-0-8109-1948-8.
