= Puerta de los Doce Cantos =

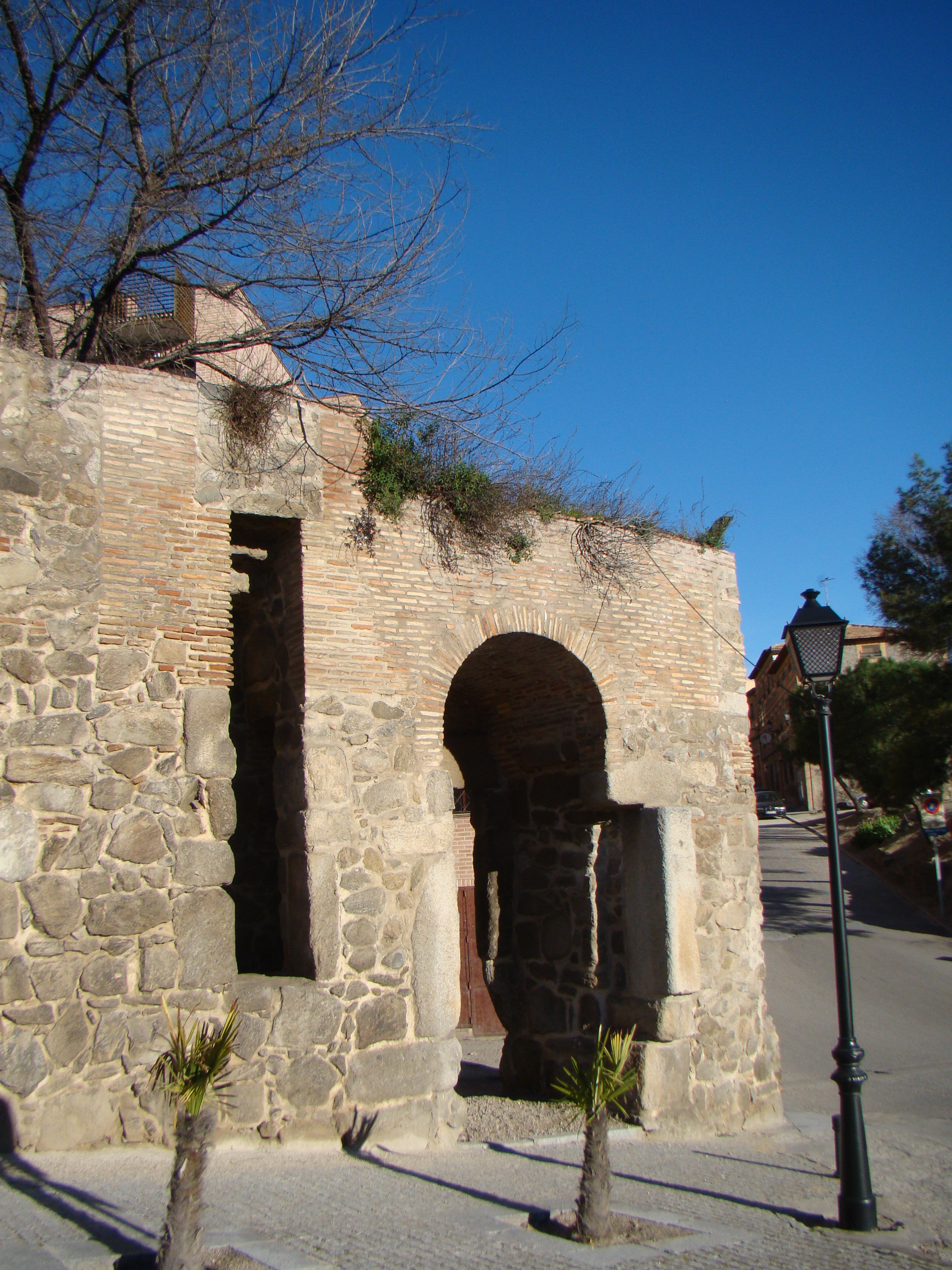
Puerta de los Doce Cantos

The Puerta de los Doce Cantos is a city gate located in the city of Toledo, in Castile-La Mancha, Spain. This is the most modest of all the gates in this city.

Of Arab origin, it is located at the southeastern end of the fortress of Al-Hieén and had to serve to give way to the troops of foot, towards the Plaza de armas de Alcántara square.

It was walled up for centuries, but with the civic renovations in the 1920s it was restored and declared of bien de interés cultural, although part of its Arabic structure had been removed.
