= Puerta de Toledo (disambiguation) =

Puerta de Toledo, gate located in Madrid, Spain

Puerta de Toledo may also refer to:

- Puerta de Toledo (Zaragoza), one of the twelve city gates that had the Walls of Zaragoza
- Puerta de Toledo (Madrid Metro), a station on Line 5 of the Madrid Metro, located under the Puerta de Toledo
