= Puerta de Alarcones =

City gate in Toledo, Spain

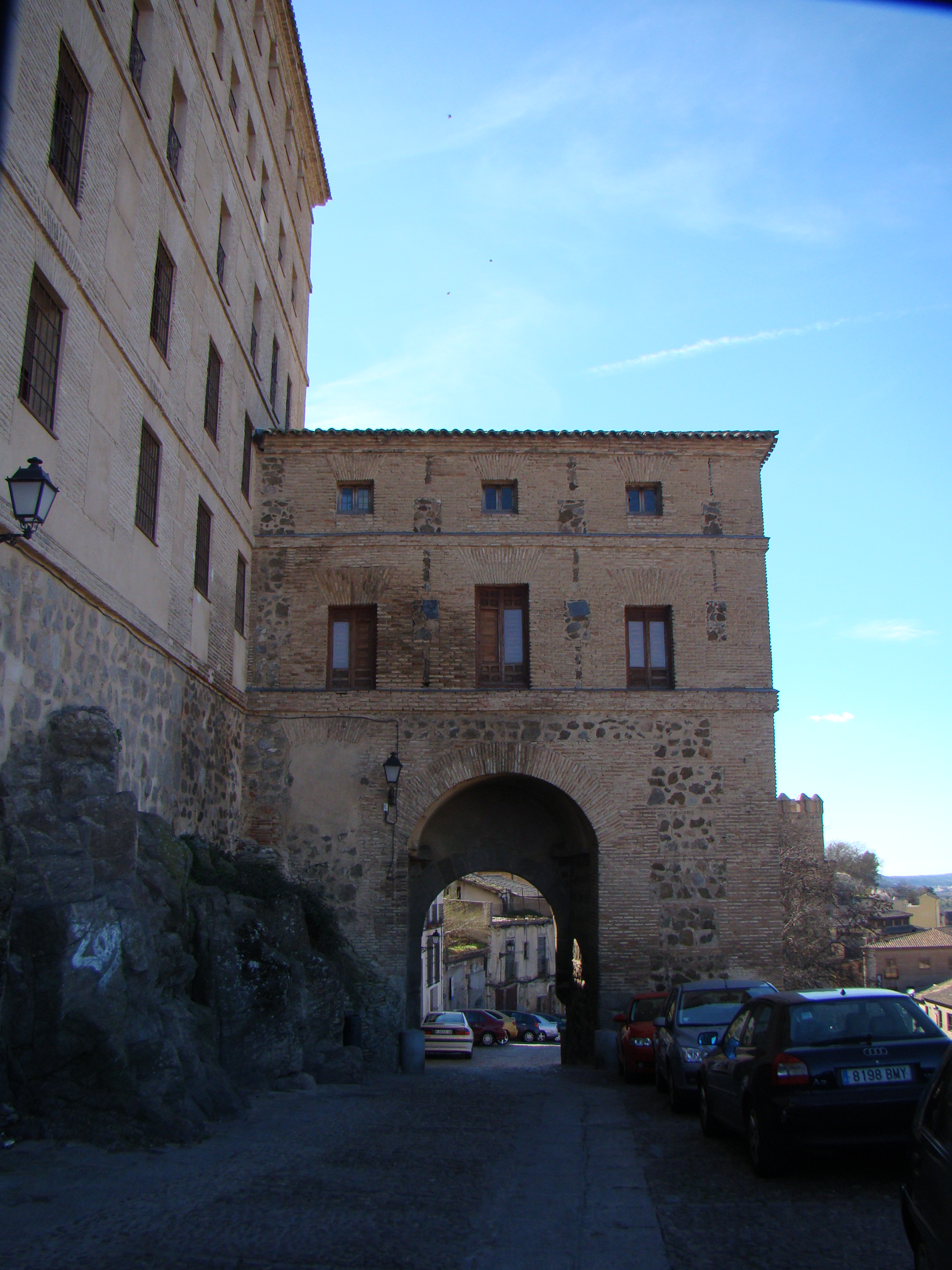
Puerta de Alarcones

The Alarcones Gate (Spanish: Puerta de Alarcones) is a city gate located in the city of Toledo, in Castile-La Mancha, Spain. It is also known by the name of Puerta de Moaguía, as cited in Mozarabic documents of 1216; and Puerta Alta de la Herrería, because it is located at the end of the street where workshops dedicated to ironworks were located.

The gate was the forced access to Zocodover square before opening the ascent of the street of the calle de las Armas, by the lookout, so that, along with the Puerta del Sol, it was adorned whenever Toledo was visited by some important personage, as a tribute to the passage of their cortege.

It is one of the oldest in the city, belonging to the Visigothic walled enclosure. The Puerta de Alarcones should have a also military crowning, which was destroyed, building itself.

A staircase has recently been discovered in its right-hand turret, whose gate existed earlier, deeper than this turret, which possibly gave access to the walls.

== Heritage listing ==
It was declared, along with rest of the Toledo's gates, walls and bridges, a National Monument of Spain in December 1921.
