= Puerta de Bisagra Nueva =

Coordinates: 39.8625°N 4.0252°W

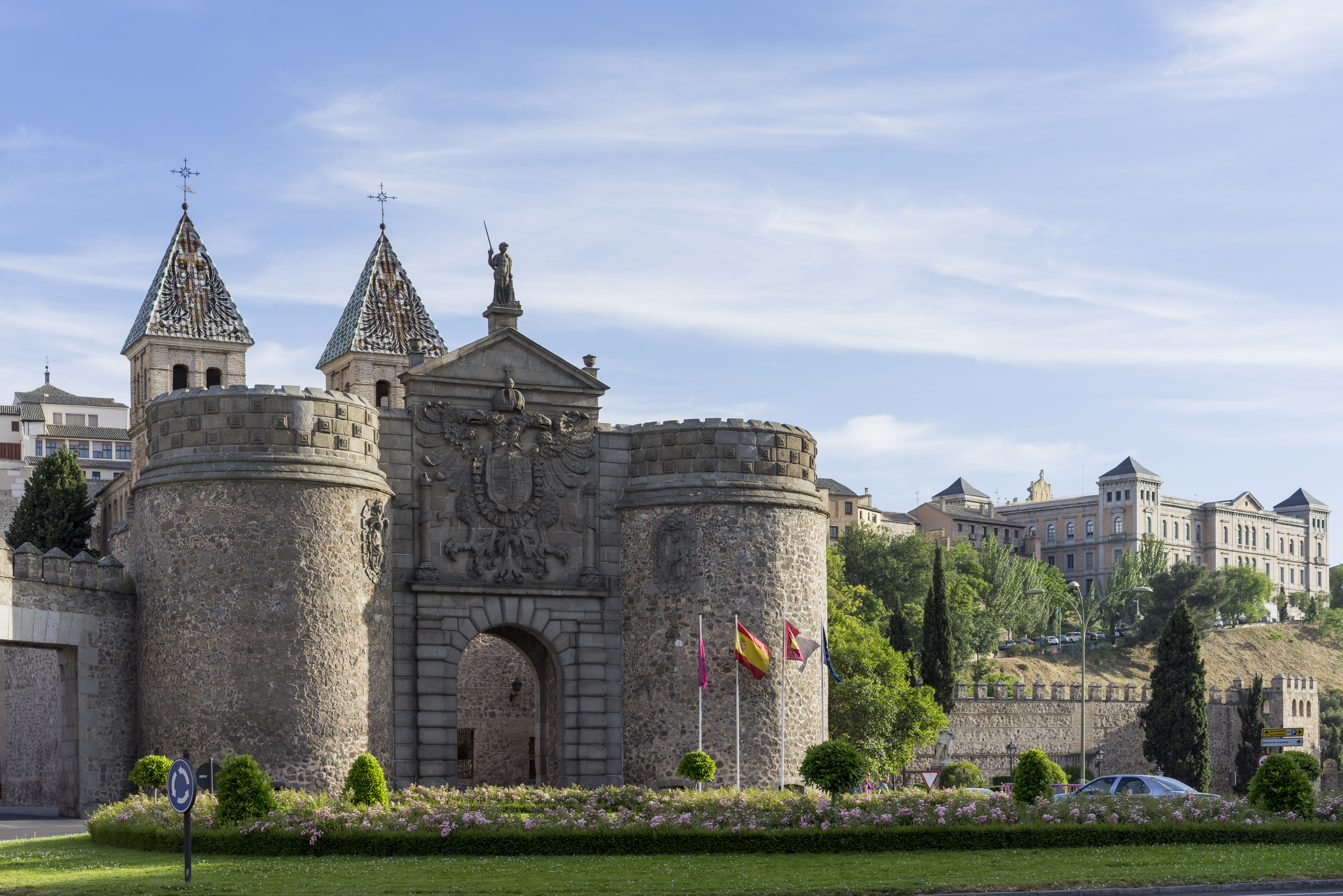
View from the outside of the city.

The Puerta de Bisagra Nueva ("The New Bisagra Gate") is the best known city gate of Toledo, Spain.

The gate is of Moorish origin, but the main part was built in 1559 by Alonso de Covarrubias. It carries the coat of arms of the emperor Charles V. It superseded the Puerta Bisagra Antigua as the main entrance to the city.

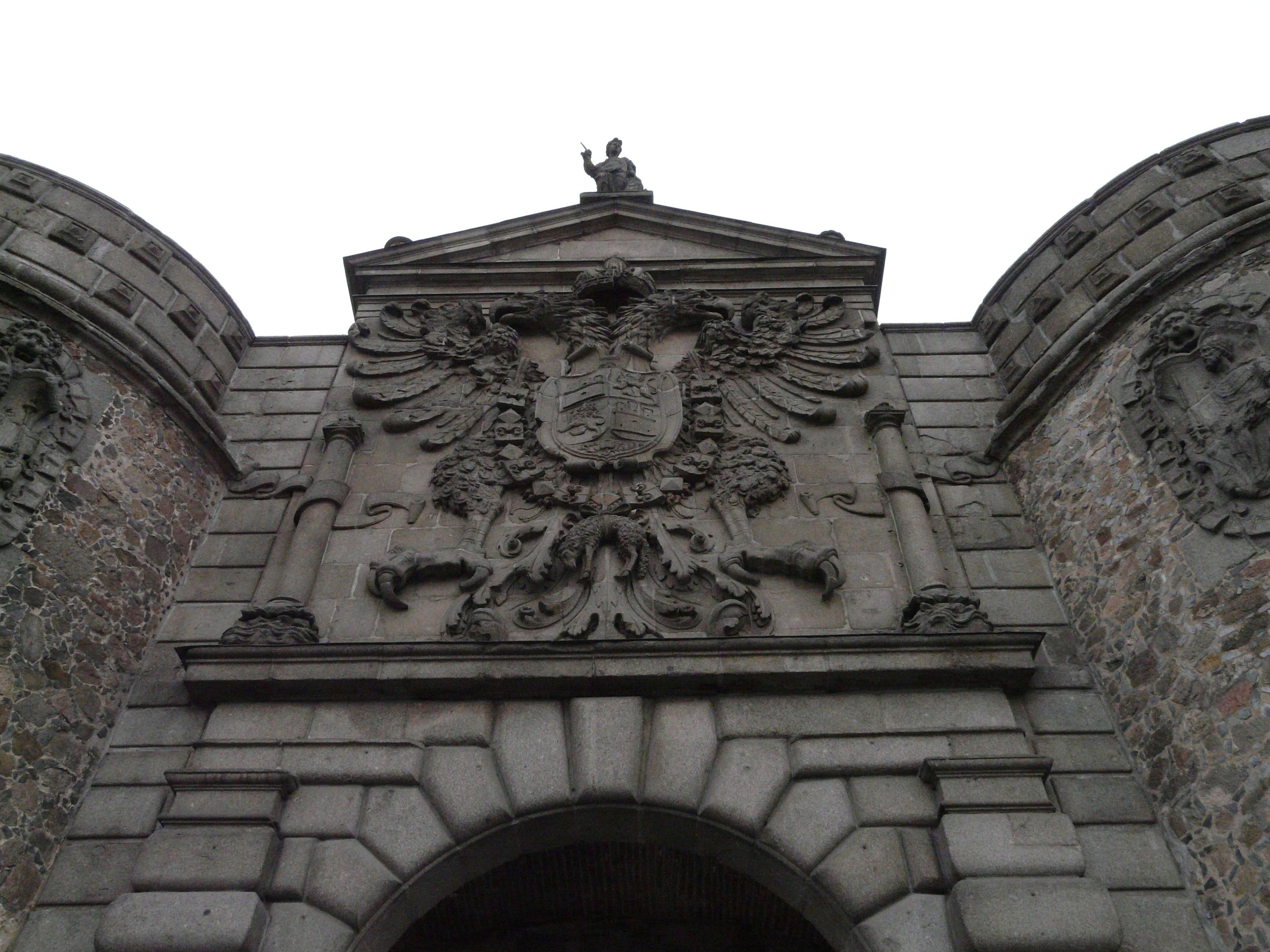
Coat of arms of emperor Charles V

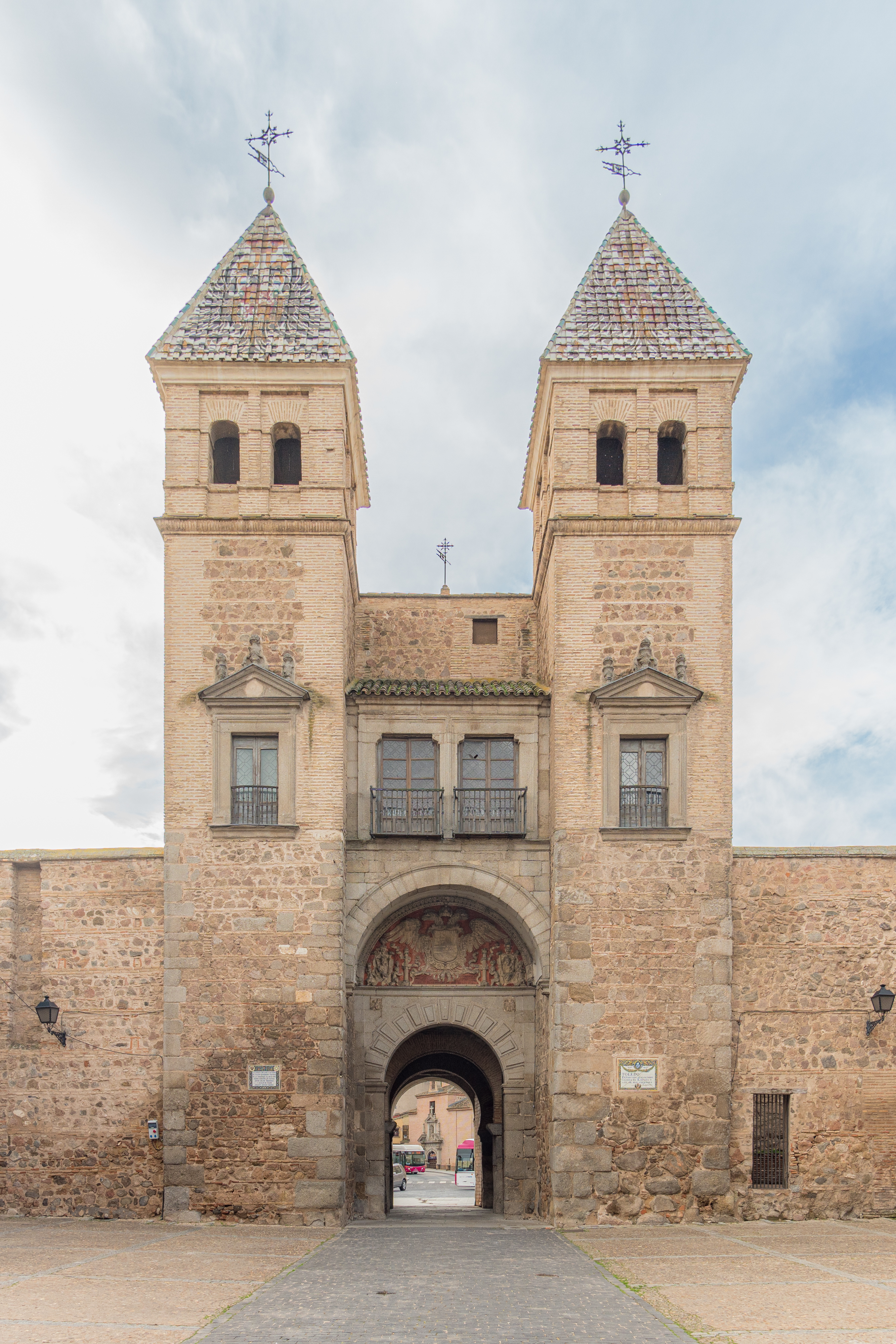
View from the interior courtyard

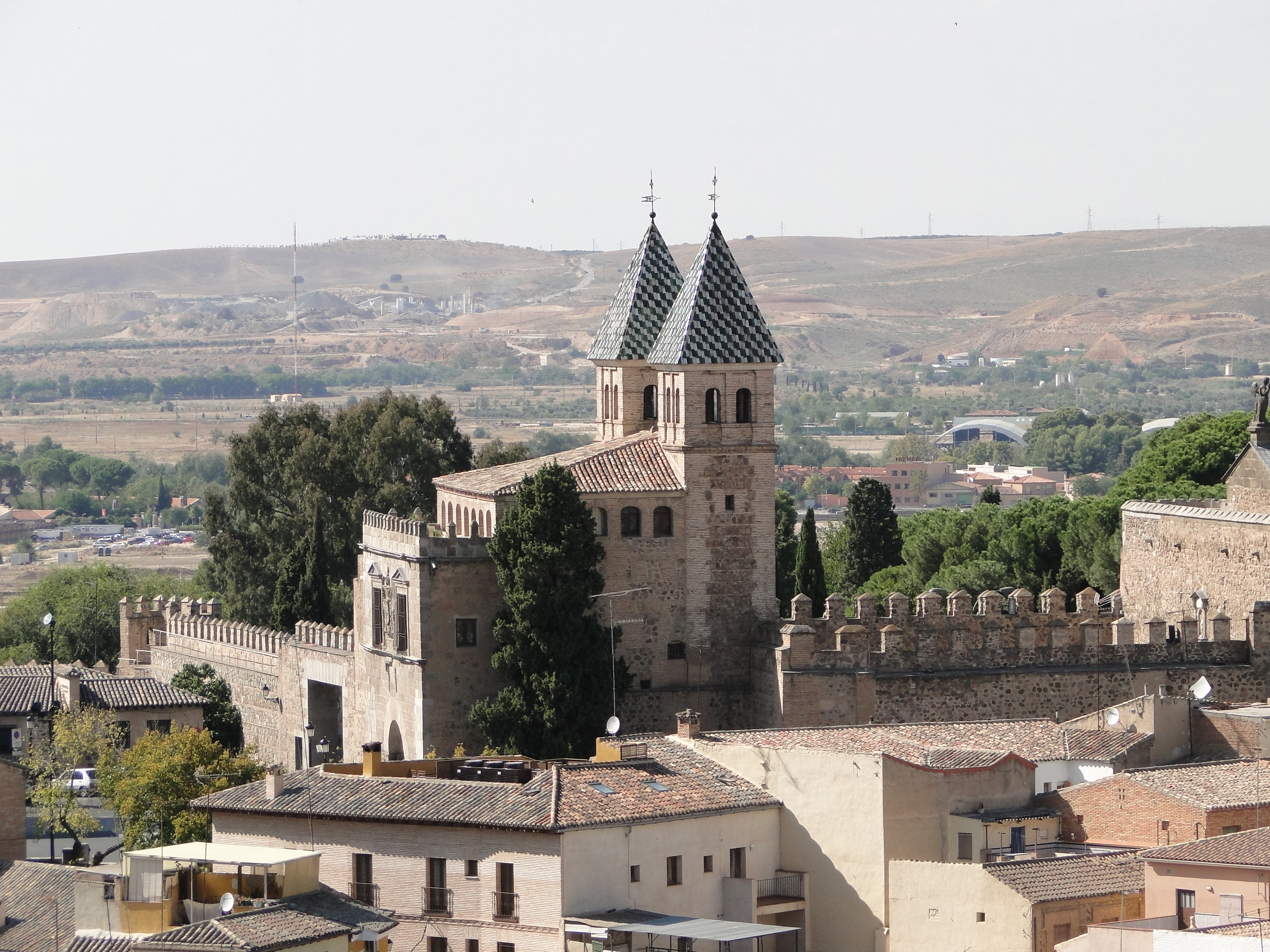
Overview

== See also ==
- Puerta de Bisagra Antigua
