= Puerta del Sol (disambiguation) =

The Puerta del Sol is a public square in Madrid, Spain.

Puerta del Sol may also refer to:

- Puerta del Sol, Toledo, a city gateway
- La Puerta del Sol, a sculpture in Chihuahua City, Mexico
- Gate of the Sun, a monolith in Tiahuanaco, Bolivia
- Puerto del Sol, a non-profit magazine from the New Mexico State University
- Sol, metro station serving the Puerta del Sol
