= La Puerta, Salta =

Coordinates: 25°17′00″S 66°21′23″W

La Puerta (Salta)
- Municipality and Village
- Interactive map of La Puerta (Salta)
- Country: Argentina
- Province: Salta Province
- Time zone: UTC−3 (ART)

La Puerta (Salta) is a village and rural municipality in Salta Province in northwestern Argentina.
