= Puerta de Bisagra =

Coordinates: 39.8622°N 4.0262°W

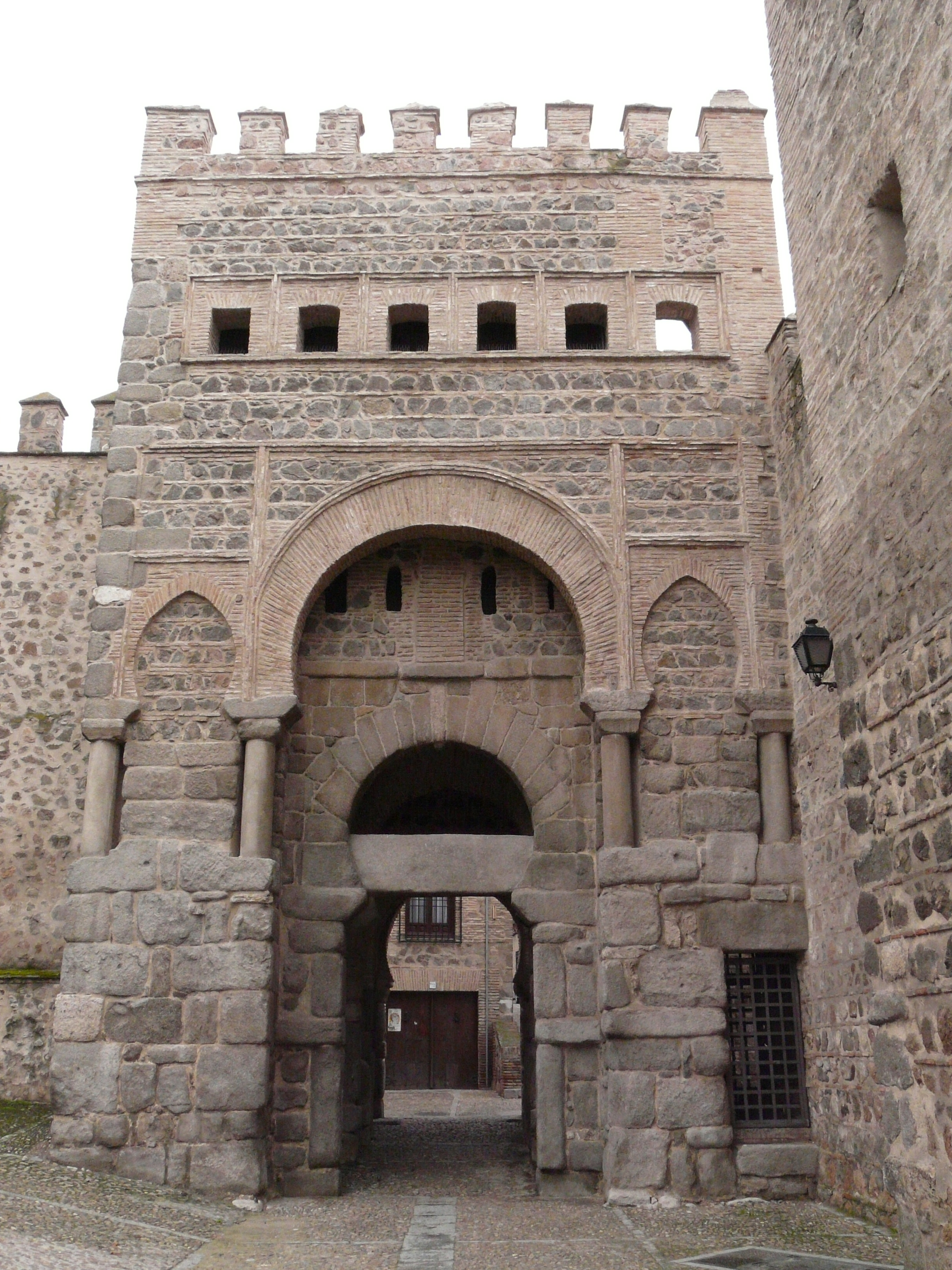
Puerta de Bisagra Antigua.

The Puerta de Bisagra (originally Bab al-Saqra, also called Puerta de Alfonso VI) is a city gate of Toledo, Spain.

The structure was constructed in the 10th century, in the time of the Moorish Taifa of Toledo in Islamic Al-Andalus. It is also called 'Bisagra Antigua' to distinguish it from the Puerta de Bisagra Nueva which was built in 1559. The gate was the main entrance to the city and dates from the Moorish period.

== See also ==
- Moorish architecture in Spain
