= La Puerta =

La Puerta may refer to:

== Places ==
- La Puerta, Argentina, a village in Catamarca Province, Argentina
- La Puerta, Salta, a village and rural municipality in Salta Province in northwestern Argentina
- La Puerta, Santa Cruz, a village located in the Chilean commune of Santa Cruz
- La Puerta, Texas, a census-designated place (CDP) in Starr County, Texas
- La Puerta de Segura, a city and municipality located in the province of Jaén

== People ==
- Luis La Puerta (1811–1896), Peruvian politician
