= Supreme Court of Justice of Buenos Aires =

Supreme Court of Justice of Buenos Aires (Argentina)

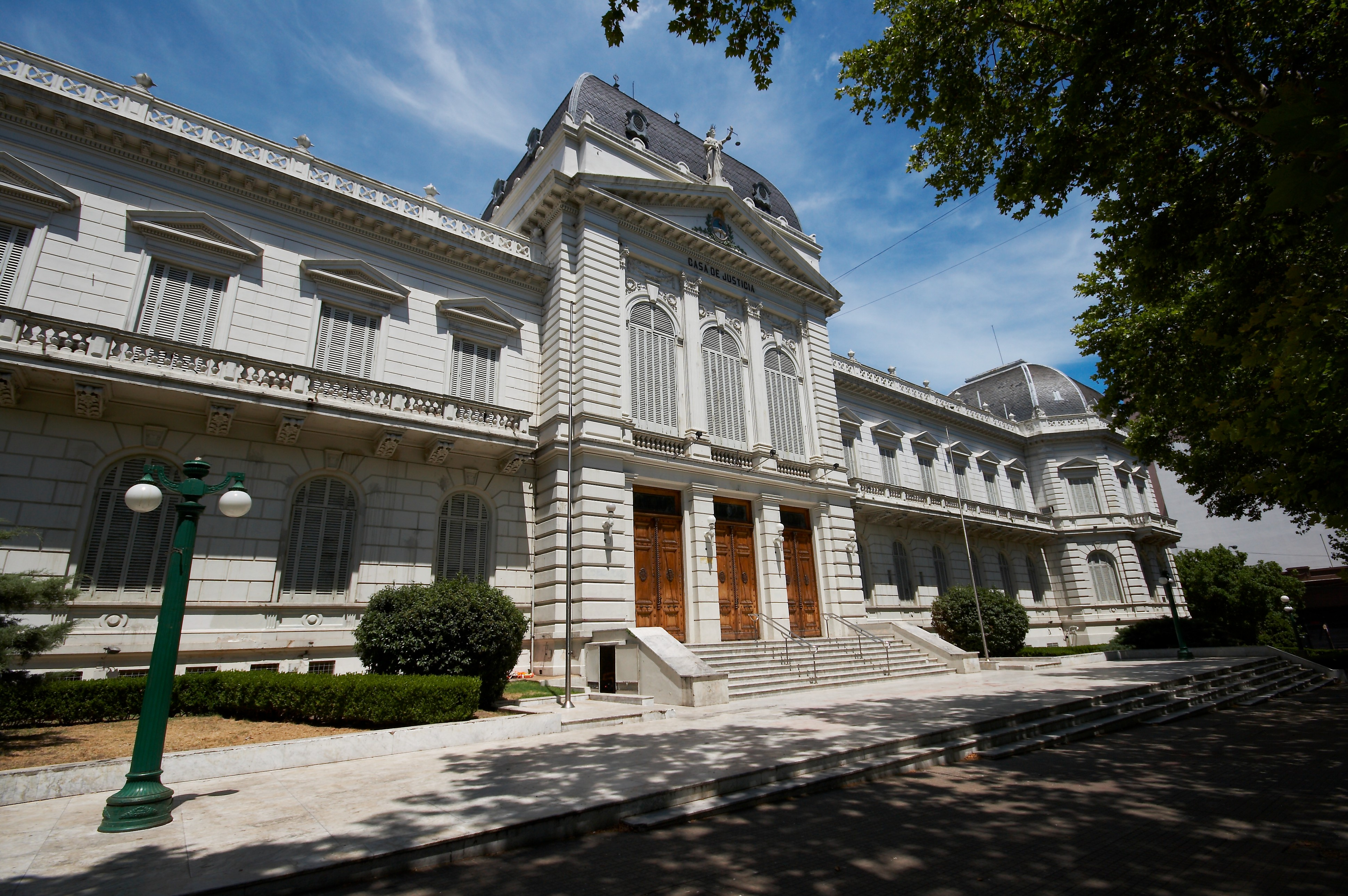
SCBA's headquarters in La Plata.

The Supreme Court of Justice of Buenos Aires (in Spanish: Suprema Corte de Justicia de Buenos Aires) is the body created in 1875 that exercises the Judicial Power in the province of Buenos Aires, one of the 24 subnational entities of Argentina.

== Composition ==
To be a member of the Supreme Court, the following is required:

- To be born in Argentine territory or to be the son of a native citizen if born in a foreign country.
- Possess a degree or diploma accrediting proficiency in the science of law.
- Be at least thirty (30) and not more than seventy (70) years of age.
- Have at least ten (10) years of practice as a lawyer or in the performance of some magistracy.

The appointment of Supreme Court justices is a power shared between the Executive Branch and the provincial Legislature. The process for doing so is expressly established in the provincial Constitution, in Article 175. There it is established that the Governor appoints the candidate and the Senate, with a special majority of two thirds of the members present, must validate it in a public session. Once the two requirements are fulfilled and before taking office, they must be sworn in, before the president of the supreme court (art. 179).

The Article 162 of the provincial Constitution establishes that the presidency of the Supreme Court of Justice shall rotate annually among its members, beginning with the oldest of age.

Its current composition is formed by Daniel Fernando Soria (since 2002) and is holding his second term as its president since 2020, Luis Esteban Genoud (since 2002), who is its vice president, Hilda Kogan (since 2002), Eduardo Julio Pettigiani (since 1996) and Sergio Gabriel Torres (since 2019).

== See also ==
- Judiciary of Argentina
