= Puerta Real (Granada) =

Coordinates: 37.1737°N 3.5997°W

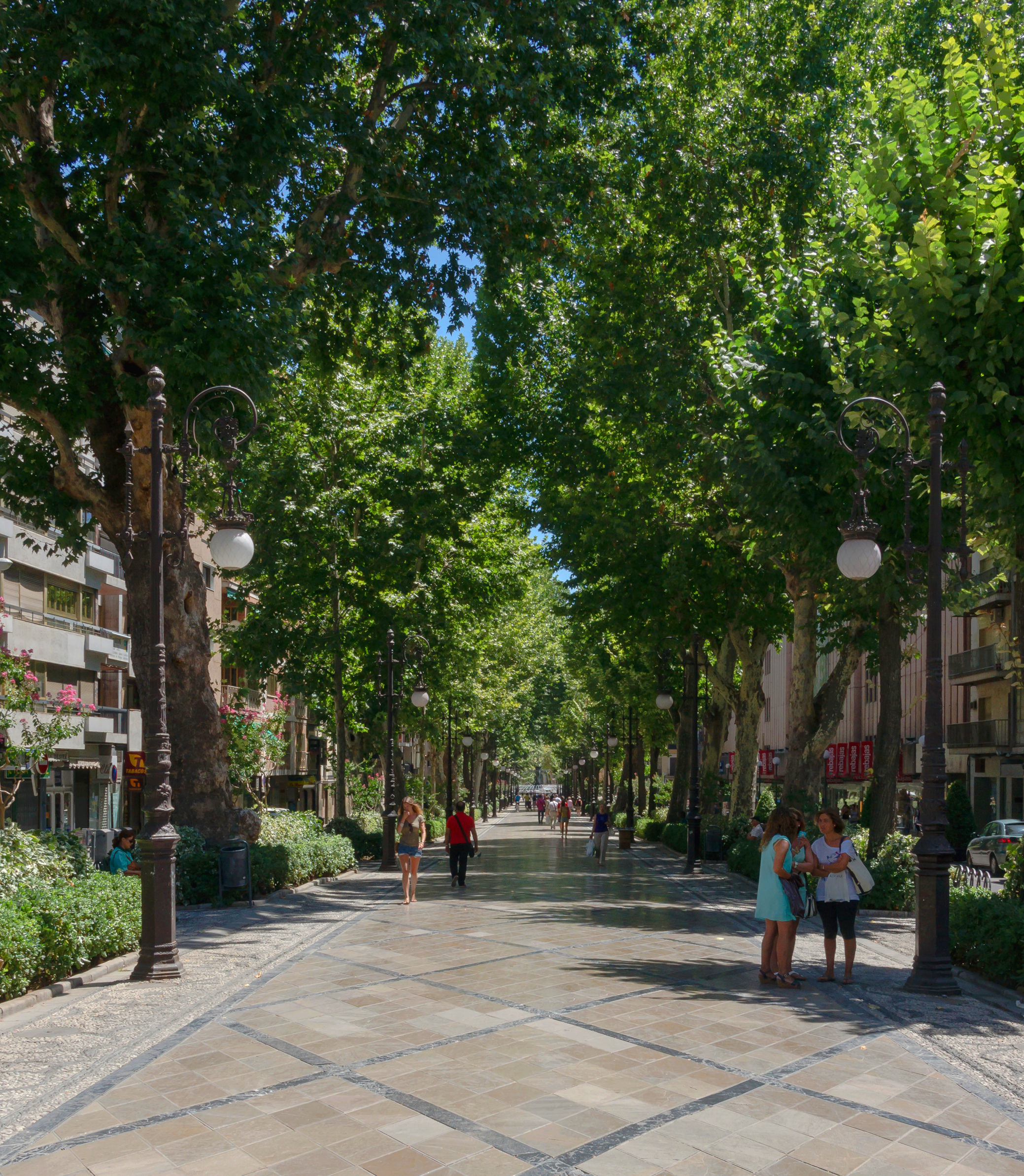
Carrera de la Virgen, an avenue in central Granada

Puerta Real ('Royal Gate' in English) is a historic area in the city centre of Granada, Spain. It the includes Recogidas Street, Reyes Católicos Street and Carrera de la Virgen.

== History ==
It was named after the visit of King Philip IV on 8 April 1624. According to documents, he visited during a storm through the gate of El Rastro or of La Paja in the Muslim defensive wall, which was known as Bib-al-Rambla. It became the central square of Granadine social life in the 16th century. In 1515, it was decorated with the Catholic Monarchs' coat of arms. In 1610, the new national symbols commemorating the end of Muslim rule on the Iberian Peninsula were added.

Puerta Real underwent many changes over its history. Until the 19th century, the Darro River ran through it, but it was enclosed for reasons of hygiene. Until then, Granadine social life had centred round Elvira Street and Plaza Nueva ('New Square'), but Puerta Real then became more popular. Several commercial establishments were set up in Puerta Real, including a no longer extant casino.
