= De la Puerta =

De la Puerta is a Spanish surname. Notable people with the surname include:

- Mariano García de la Puerta (1907–?), Spanish footballer
- Sebastián Calvo de la Puerta (1751–1820), Spanish nobleman and soldier

== See also ==
- La Puerta
- Real Club de la Puerta de Hierro, a private country club based in Madrid
