= Leonard Swidler =

American academic (1929–2026)

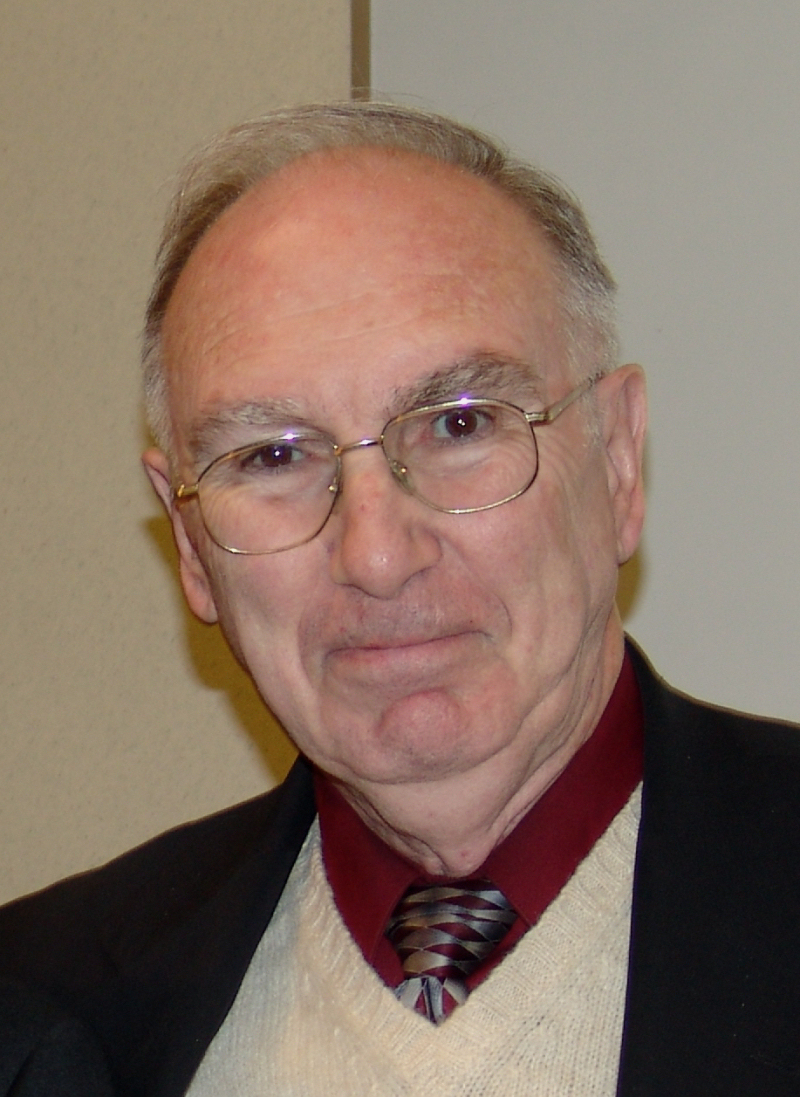
Swidler in 2005

Leonard Joseph Swidler (January 6, 1929 – March 23, 2026) was an American academic who was Professor of Catholic Thought and Interreligious Dialogue at Temple University, Philadelphia, Pennsylvania, where he taught from 1966 to 2022. He was the co-founder (in 1964, with Arlene Swidler) and editor of the Journal of Ecumenical Studies (quarterly). He was also the founder of the Dialogue Institute (founded 1978), cofounder in 2011 of the publisher iPub Global Connection, and the founder and past president of the Association for the Rights of Catholics in the Church (1980–).

== Life and career ==
Leonard Joseph Swidler was born in Sioux City, Iowa, on January 6, 1929, to Josephine Marie Reed Swidler (1901–1962) and Samuel Swidler (1897–1984). His father was a Ukrainian Jew who had come to the U.S. at age 16, and his mother was an Irish-American Catholic. Eventually, the family moved to Cumberland, Wisconsin, and then to Green Bay, where his parents owned and operated the Bay Beauty Shop until after World War II, when they bought a home in Allouez and set up a beauty parlor there. Samuel worked in a paper mill in DePere and Josephine continued to run the hair salon. In 1935, Leonard's brother Jack was born, followed in 1940 by his sister Sandra.

In 1957, while they were graduate students at the University of Wisconsin, Leonard Swidler and Arlene Anderson were married. They had two daughters, Carmel (born 1958) and Eva (born 1962), and one granddaughter, Willow (born 2000). Leonard and Arlene Swidler lived in Philadelphia since 1966. Arlene died at home in 2008 after suffering from Alzheimer's for 17 years.

Swidler published over 80 books and 200 articles. He lectured in many countries, including Austria, Germany, Malaysia and the United States.

Swidler wrote Towards a Global Ethic: An Initial Declaration ratified at the Parliament of the World's Religions in 1993 and updated in 2018 by the Parliament and the leadership of Myriam Renaud, PhD.

A biography of Swidler by River Adams titled There Must Be You - Leonard Swidler's Journey to Faith and Dialogue appeared in 2014 (Resource Publications).

Swidler died on March 23, 2026, at the age of 97.

== Honors ==
- LL.D. from La Salle University, Philadelphia, October, 1977.
- LL.D. from St. Norbert College, DePere, WI, October, 2001.
- Prize for 2002 from the Academic Society for the Research of Religions and Ideologies (SACRI), University of Cluj, Romania.

== Education ==
• St. Norbert College, B.A. (1946–50) - Philosophy
• St. Norbert Seminary, 1950–52 - Theology
• St. Paul Seminary (Minnesota), 1952–54 - Theology
• Marquette University, 1954–55 - M.A. in History; Philosophy and Literature Minors
• University of Wisconsin, 1955–57 - History, Philosophy and Literature
• University of Tübingen (Germany), 1957–58 - History and Theology; Licentiate in Sacred Theology (S.T.L.) in 1959
• Ludwig-Maximilians-Universität München (Germany), 1958–59 - History and Theology
• University of Wisconsin (1961) - Ph.D. in History

== Teaching ==
• Milwaukee School of Engineering, 1955 (English)
• Edgewood College, 1955–56 (Philosophy)
• University of Wisconsin: Integrated Liberal Studies Department, 1956–57 (English and History)
• University of Maryland in Europe, 1958–60 (History and Philosophy)
• U.S.A.R. Intelligence School, Fort Sheridan, 1959 (German)
• Duquesne University, 1960–66 (History; also on Theology faculty, 1962–66)
• Professor at Temple University, Religion Department, 1966–2022

Guest Positions while tenured at Temple University
• ACUIIS summer school at University of Graz, Austria, 1972, 1973
• Guest Professor on the Catholic Theology Faculty and the Protestant Theology Faculty of the University of Tübingen, 1972–73
• Visiting Professor at Saint Michael's College, Winouski, VT. Summer, 1976
• Exchange Professor on the Catholic Theology Faculty and the Institute for Ecumenical Research of the University of Tübingen, Summer Semester, 1982
• Exchange Professor on the Catholic Theology Faculty and the Institute for Ecumenical Research of the University of Tübingen, Summer Semester, 1985
• Guest Professor in the Philosophy Department, Nankai University, Tianjin, People's Republic of China, Summer Semester, 1986
• Professor at Temple University Japan (Tokyo), Summer School, May–June, 1987
• Exchange Professor on the Protestant Theology Faculty, Hamburg University, Fall semester, 1989
• Guest Professor in the Philosophy Department, Fudan University, Shanghai, China, Summer Semester, 1990
• Professor at Temple University Japan (Tokyo), 1990–91
• Visiting Fulbright Professor at Centre for Civilisational Dialogue of the University of Malaya, Kualalumpur, Malaysia, summer 2003
• Visiting Fulbright Professor at Centre for Civilisational Dialogue of the University of Malaysia, Kualalumpur, Malaysia, summer 2004
• Visiting Professor, East China University, Shanghai, China, June, 2004
• Visiting Professor, Fudan University, Shanghai, China, June, 2004
• Visiting Professor, Peoples’ University, Beijing, China, June, 2004
• Visiting Fulbright Professor at Centre for Catholic Studies, Chung Chi College, The Chinese University of Hong Kong, November, 2007 • Visiting Fulbright Professor at Khazar University, Baku, Azerbaijan, May 1–28, 2011

== Publications ==
Books (including edited and translated volumes)

- Dialogue for Reunion. New York: Herder and Herder, 1962.
- Scripture and Ecumenism (ed.) Pittsburgh: Duquesne University Press, 1965.
- The Ecumenical Vanguard. Pittsburgh: Duquesne University Press, 1965.
- Jewish-Christian Dialogues (with Rabbi Marc Tanenbaum). Wash., DC: National Council of Catholic Men and National Council of Catholic Women, 1966.
- Ecumenism, the Spirit and Worship (ed.) Pittsburgh: Duquesne University Press 1967.
- Bultmann, Barth and Catholic Theology, by Heinrich Fries (Introduction and translation). Pittsburgh: Duquesne U Press, 1967.
- Freedom in the Church. Dayton: Pflaum Press, 1969.
- Bishops and People (author, editor, and translator with Arlene Swidler). Philadelphia: Westminster Press, 1970.
- Women Priests in the Catholic Church?, Haye van der Meer (introduction, postscript, and translation with Arlene Swidler). Philadelphia: Temple University Press, 1973.
- Isj and Isjah (joint author with Jan Kerkhofs). Antwerp/Utrecht: Uitgeverij Patmos, 1973.
- Jews and Christians in Dialogue (ed.). Philadelphia: Journal of Ecumenical Studies, 1975.
- Women in Judaism. The Status of Women in Formative Judaism. Metuchen, NJ: Scarecrow Press, 1976.
- The Eucharist in Ecumenical Dialogue (ed.). New York: Paulist, 1976; & as Journal of Ecumenical Studies, 13, 2 (Spring, 1976).
- Bloodwitness for Peace and Unity. Denville, NJ: Dimension Books, 1977.
- Women Priests: Catholic Commentary on the Vatican Declaration (ed. with A. Swidler). New York: Paulist Press, 1977.
- Jewish-Christian-Muslim Dialogue (ed.). Philadelphia: Journal of Ecumenical Studies, 1978.
- Aufklärung Catholicism 1780-1850. Missoula, MT: Scholars Press, 1978.
- A Commentary on the Oberammergau Passionspiel in regard to Its Image of Jews and Judaism. New York: ADL, 1978.
- Biblical Affirmations of Woman. Philadelphia: Westminster Press, 1979 (4th printing, 1991).
- Consensus in Theology? A Dialogue with Hans Küng and Edward Schillebeeckx (editor and co-author). Philadelphia: Westminster Press, 1980; also as Journal of Ecumenical Studies, vol. 17, no. 1 (Winter, 1980).
- Jewish Monotheism and Christian Trinitarian Doctrine, Pinchas Lapide and Jürgen Moltmann (Introduction and translation). Philadelphia: Fortress Press, 1980.
- The Oberammergau Passionspiel 1984 (Das Oberammergauer Passionspiel 1984). New York: Anti-Defamation League, 1980.
- From Holocaust to Dialogue: A Jewish-Christian Dialogue between Americans and Germans (editor and co-author). Philadelphia: Journal of Ecumenical Studies, 1981.
- Küng in Conflict. New York: Doubleday, 1981.
- Authority in the Church and the Schillebeeckx Case (co-editor with Piet Fransen & co-author). New York: Crossroad, 1982; also as JES, 19, 2 (Spring, 1982).
- Tractate on the Jews by Franz Mussner (translation and Introduction). Philadelphia: Fortress Press, 1984.
- The Passion of the Jew Jesus (Das Leiden des Juden Jesus) New York: Anti-Defamation League, 1984.
- Buddhism Made Plain (with Antony Fernando). Maryknoll, NY: Orbis Books, 1984 (7th printing, 1996).
- Ed. and founder of Templum, Religion Department Newsletter, Temple University, 1985‐.
- Religious Liberty and Human Rights (editor & author). New York/Philadelphia: Hippocrene Books/Ecumenical Press, 1986.
- “Breaking down the Wall” between Americans & East Germans, Christians and Jews (editor & author). Lanham, MD: University Press of America, 1987.
- Church in Anguish: Has the Vatican Betrayed Vatican II? (co-ed. with Hans Küng, & author). San Francisco: Harper & Row, 1987.
- Toward a Universal Theology of Religion (editor and author). Maryknoll, NY: Orbis Books, 1987.
- A Catholic Bill of Rights (co-editor with Patrick Connor and author). Kansas City: Sheed & Ward, 1988.
- Catholic-Communist Collaboration in Italy (co-editor with Edward Grace and author). Lanham MD: University Press of America, 1988.
- Yeshua: A Model for Moderns. Kansas City: Sheed & Ward, 1988; 2nd expanded ed., 1993.
- Cristãos e Não-Cristãos em Diálogo [Christians and Non-Christians in Dialogue] (in Portuguese), São Paulo: Paulinas, 1988.
- After the Absolute: The Dialogical Future of Religious Reflection. Minneapolis: Fortress Press, 1990.
- Death or Dialogue. From the Age of Monologue to the Age of Dialogue (with John Cobb, Monika Hellwig, and Paul F. Knitter Philadelphia: Trinity Press International, 1990.
- Bursting the Bonds. A Jewish-Christian Dialogue on Jesus and Paul (editor & co-author with Gerard Sloyan, Lewis Eron, and Lester Dean). Maryknoll, NY: Orbis Books, 1990.
- Attitudes of Religions and Ideologies towards the Outsider: The Other (co-ed. with Paul Mojzes & author). NY: Mellen Press, 1990.
- A Bridge to Buddhist-Christian Dialogue (co-author with and trans. of Seiichi Yagi). Mahwah NJ: Paulist Press, 1990.
- Christian Mission and Interreligious Dialogue (co-editor with Paul Mojzes and author). New York: Edwin Mellen Press, 1990.
- “Alle Christen haben das Recht...” (co-editor with Patrick Connor author). Munich: Kösel Verlag, 1990.
- Human Rights: Christians, Marxists and Others in Dialogue (editor/author). New York: Paragon House, 1991.
- Der umstrittene Jesus. Stuttgart: Quell Verlag, 1991. Kaiser Taschenbuch. Gütersloh: Chr. Kaiser/Gütersloher Verlagshaus, 1993.
- Muslims in Dialogue. The Evolution of a Dialogue over a Generation (editor/author). New York: E. Mellen Press 1992.
- My Witness For the Church, by Bernard Häring. Translation and Introduction. Mahwah, NJ: Paulist Press, 1992.
- The Meaning of Life At the Edge of the Third Millennium. Mahwah, NJ: Paulist Press, 1992.
- Die Zukunft der Theologie im Dialog der Religionen und Weltanschauungen. Regensburg/Munich: Pustet/Kaiser Verlag, 1992.
- Introduzione al buddismo. Paralleli con l’etica ebraico-cristiana (co-author w. Antony Fernando). Bologna: Edizioni Dehoniane, 1992.
- IESHUA — Jesus histórico, Cristologia, Ecumenismo (in Portuguese), São Paulo: Paulinas, 1993.
- Yeshua: Gendaijin no Moderu Iesu (translated by Seiichi Yagi). Tokyo, Shinkyo Shuppansha Pub., 1994.
- Suffering From the Church, by Heinrich Fries. Introduction &trans. with Arlene Swidler. Collegeville, MN: Liturgical Press, 1995.
- O Sentido da Vida no Limiar do Terceiro milênio [The Meaning of Life] (in Portuguese), Sâo Paulo: Paulus, 1996.
- Toward a Catholic Constitution. New York: Crossroad Press, 1996.
- Bulgyo wa Grisdogyo Rulita (Buddhism Made Plain). Benedict Press. Waegwan, Korea, 1996.
- The Uniqueness of Jesus, co-editor with Paul Mojzes. Maryknoll, NY: Orbis Books, 1997.
- Theoria—>Praxis. How Jews, Christians, Muslims Can Together Move From Theory to Practice. Antwerp: Peeters Publi., 1998.
- For All Life. Toward a Universal Declaration of a Global Ethic: An Interreligious Dialogue. Ashland: White Cloud Press, 1999.
- The Study of Religion in an Age of Global Dialogue (co-author with Paul Mojzes). Philadelphia: Temple University Press, 2000.
- Dupa absolut. Viitorul dialogic al reflectiei religioase. Cluj, Romania: Limes, 2003.
- Interreligious Dialogue Toward Reconciliation in Macedonia and Bosnia, co-editor with Paul Mojzes and Heinz-Gerhard Justenhoven. Philadelphia: Ecumenical Press, 2003
- After the Absolute (Korean - tr. Chan-Su Yi). Seoul: Ehwa University Press, 2003.
- Dialogue in Malaysia and the Globe. Kuala Lumpur. University of Malaya, 2004.
- Our Understanding of Ultimate Reality Shapes Our Actions. Kuala Lumpur. University of Malaya, 2004.
- Confucianism in Dialogue Today. West, Christianity, and Judaism (co-editor with Shu-hsien Liu and John Berthrong). Philadelphia: Ecumenical Press, 2005.
- Изучуьањето на релиґиата во ерата на глобалнот дијалог (The Study of Religion). Macedonian Translation by Slobadanka Markovska. Skopje, Macedonia: Tempjum, 2005.
- Quanqiu Duihua de Shidai. The Age of Global Dialogue. Trans. by Lihua Liu. Beijing: China Social Science Press, 2006.
- Making the Church Our Own. How We Can Reform the Catholic Church from the Ground Up. Lanham, MD: Sheed & Ward, 2007.
- Jesus Was a Feminist. What the Gospels Reveal about His Revolutionary Perspective. Lanham, MD: Sheed & Ward, 2007.
- Trialogue. Jews, Christians, and Muslims in Dialogue. New London, CT: Twenty-Third Publications, 2007.
- A Global Ethic. Journal of Ecumenical Studies, 42, 3 (Summer, 2007), editor/author.
- Constitutional Catholicism. An Essential in Reforming the Church. Philadelphia, PA: The Ecumenical Press, 2011.
- Club Modernity. For Reluctant Christians. Philadelphia, PA. The Ecumenical Press, 2011.
- Democratic Bishops for the Roman Catholic Church, with Arlene Swidler. The Ecumenical Press, 2011.
- Editor of the book series: Religions In Dialogue, New York: Edwin Mellen Press, 1990–.
- Editor and co-founder (with Arlene Swidler) of the Journal of Ecumenical Studies (quarterly), 1964–.
- Letters to Will Does Life Have Meaning?, iPub Global Connection LLC, 2017.
- Letters to Will What is Right and Wrong?, iPub Global Connection LLC, 2018
- Letters to Will What is Global Ethic?, iPub Global Connection LLC 2018
- Letters to Will What is Buddhism?, iPub Global Connection LLC 2019
- Letters to Will Jesus Was a Feminist and Much Much More, iPub Global Connection LLC 2019
- The Power of Dialogue, iPub Global Connection LLC 2018
- Breakthrough to Dialogue: The Story of Temple University Department of Religion, iPub Global Connection LLC 2019
- Movement for a Global Ethic, iPub Global Connection LLC 2018
- Yeshua Jesus the Jew A Model for Everyone, iPub Global Connection LLC 2020
- Letters to Will Jesus Was a Rabbi? OMG! iPub Global Connection LLC 2020
