= Religion not the crying need of India =

1893 lecture by Swami Vivekananda

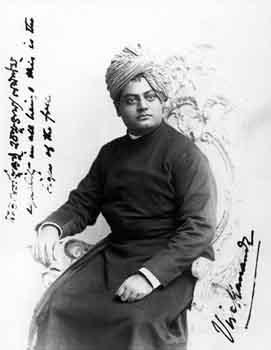
Swami Vivekananda, who delivered the lecture

"Religion not the crying need of India" was a lecture delivered by Indian Hindu monk Swami Vivekananda on 20 September 1893 at the Parliament of the World's Religions, Chicago. In the lecture, Vivekananda criticized Christian missionaries for ignoring the needs of starving people in India. He said that Indians did not need any religious education, as there was already a surfeit of religion in the East. Instead, Vivekananda pushed for humanitarian support for the hungry.

== Background ==
Vivekananda represented India and Hinduism at the 1893 Parliament of the World's Religions, which ran from 11 to 27 September in Chicago. This event marked the first world conference of the representatives of Eastern and Western religions. His introductory speech on 11 September 1893 was of a general nature, stating that no religion was superior or inferior to another. He gave subsequent lectures on 15, 19 and 20 September, covering specific religious issues.

=== 20 September 1893 ===
On 19 September 1893, Vivekananda's speech veered towards anti-Christian expressions. On 20 September, before Vivekananda started his impromptu speech (as other speakers had not turned up), Prof. Isaac T. Headland, a missionary who worked in China, had presented a paper on "Religion in Peking." This prompted Swamiji to react to this paper and observe that as poverty was prevailing in China it would be advisable for the missionaries to help in alleviating this problem by setting up camps, rather than persuading them to convert to Christianity. In his speech Swamiji in the same context then presented his theme "Religion not the crying need of India" admonishing Christians for their missionary activity in India. This speech was his fourth lecture at the parliament. Vivekananda was not scheduled to speak that day. After the end of Mr. Headland's (Note: Another speaker at the Parliament) speech, Dr. Momerie (Note: Speaker of that day's conference) announced that the other speaker for that evening was absent. The audience saw Vivekananda in the gallery and asked him to deliver a lecture. Vivekananda assented to the request and started his speech.

His tenor of attack was of Christians ignoring the needs of starving millions in India. He said that the people did not need missionaries to preach to them or to build more churches; there was already a surfeit of religion in the East. Thousands had perished out of hunger, but the Christians had ignored them. He said that the starving people, referred to as "heathens" by missionaries, needed food, which was not offered by the Christian world. He criticized Christians for not providing enough help to the poor and starving Indians. He also declared that it was food and not religion which was the crying need of India.

== Lecture ==
Vivekananda delivered the following lecture that day (see The Complete Works of Swami Vivekananda Volume I):

Christians must always be ready for good criticism, and I hardly think that you will mind if I make a little criticism. You Christians, who are so fond of sending out missionaries to save the soul of the heathen — why do you not try to save their bodies from starvation? In India, during the terrible famines, thousands died from hunger, yet you Christians did nothing. You erect churches all through India, but the crying evil in the East is not religion — they have religion enough — but it is bread that the suffering millions of burning India cry out for with parched throats. They ask us for bread, but we give them stones. It is an insult to a starving people to offer them religion; it is an insult to a starving man to teach him metaphysics. In India, a priest that preached for money would lose caste and be spat upon by the people. I came here to seek aid for my impoverished people, and I fully realised how difficult it was to get help for heathens from Christians in a Christian land.

== Significance ==
This lecture is considered to be a significant one. Chicago Inter Ocean published an article on this speech on 21 September 1893. According to Vijay Prashad, the writer of The Karma of Brown Folk, this lecture showed Vivekananda's frustrations. He was "furious with the United States for its belief that religion was its sole export to the subcontinent."
