= Buddhism, the Fulfilment of Hinduism =

1893 lecture by Swami Vivekananda

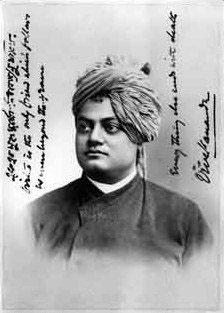
- Swami Vivekananda in Chicago in 1893
- Date: 26 September 1893
- Location: Chicago, United States
- Website: www.parliamentofreligions.org

"Buddhism, the Fulfilment of Hinduism" is a lecture delivered by Indian Hindu monk and expounder Swami Vivekananda on 26 September 1893 at the Parliament of the World's Religions in Chicago. In this lecture, he expressed his opinion that "Buddhism was the fulfilment of Hinduism."

== Background ==
In 1893, Swami Vivekananda went to the United States and joined the Parliament of the World's Religions as a delegate of Hinduism and India, which ran from 11 to 27 September in that year in Chicago. This event also marked the first world conference of the representatives of Eastern and Western religions. After his introductory speech to the Parliament of religions on 11 September 1893, which was of a general nature stating no religion was superior or inferior to the other, his subsequent lectures were on 15th, 19, 20 and 26 September were on specific issues of religion.

== Lecture ==
This lecture was delivered on 26 September 1893. Swami Vivekananda, also known as "neo-Vedanti", in his lecture at the Parliament, highlighted the fact that the Buddha is worshipped as one of the incarnations of God whereas in China, Japan and Ceylon (Sri Lanka) Buddhism is the religious practice. He particularly said that Buddhism was a rebel child of Hinduism. Buddha's teachings were a "Gift to the World" and drew parallels to Christianity emerging from Jesus, a Jew. He stated that the two religious practices – Hinduism, a Vedic religion, and Buddhism of the Shakyamuni, a Hindu who "expanded on the truths from the hidden Vedas" – are mutually inclusive. The teachings of Buddha were not new but were rooted in Vedic scriptures, and he was the first monk who initiated the proselytisation of his ethos all over the world; the other religious preachers came much later. However, one distinction he pointed out in his lecture was a comparison with other religions of the world such as Christianity in which Jews who opposed Jesus Christ crucified him, while in India in contrast Buddha was worshipped as God. He was also critical of the way Buddhism was practised in the world now.

Swamiji elaborated on the reasons for the near total elimination of the Buddhist religion (Mahayana Buddhism) from India. He said that "At the present day there is not one who calls oneself a Buddhist in India, the land of its birth." This was because Buddha's philosophy clashed with the "eternal rocks of the Vedas" to which people, Brahmin's in particular, were wedded and did not want to accept change. Thus, Buddhism could not survive in India. When Buddha was asked by his Brahmin disciples to translate his works, which were in the local language of the people, to Sanskrit, his reply was "I am for the poor, for the people; let me speak in the tongue of the people." Swamiji also mentioned in his speech the loss to India was the "reforming zeal, that wonderful sympathy and charity for everybody, that wonderful leaven which Buddhism had brought to the masses."

Swamiji also stated that Buddhism should not be confused with Vedanta, in the same way as The Salvation Army is not to be confused with Christianity. Swamiji also opined that Buddhism was the "fulfillment of Hinduism" and thus Buddhists were wedded to the "brains and philosophy of the Brahmins" and similarly the Buddhists were the heart of the Hinduism.

== Significance ==
According to Rabindra Kumar Dasgupta, the author of Swami Vivekananda on Indian philosophy and literature, it was his "historic address on Buddhism". A summary of the lecture was published The Indian Mirror on 29 June 1895, which emphasised the concluding words of the lecture—

We cannot live without you, nor you without us. Then believe that separation has shown to us, that you cannot stand without the brain and the philosophy of the Brahman [sic], nor we without your heart. This separation between the Buddhist and the Brahman [Brahmin] is the cause of the downfall of India. That is why India has been the slave of conquerors for the past 1000 years. Let us then join the wonderful intellect of the Brahman [Brahmin] with the heart, the noble soul, the wonderful humanising power of the Great Master.

The Srilankan Buddhist pioneer Anagarika Dharmapala equally spoke at this gathering and stressed on Buddha's word as a universal Teaching.
