= To the Fourth of July =

1898 poem by Swami Vivekananda

- by Swami Vivekananda
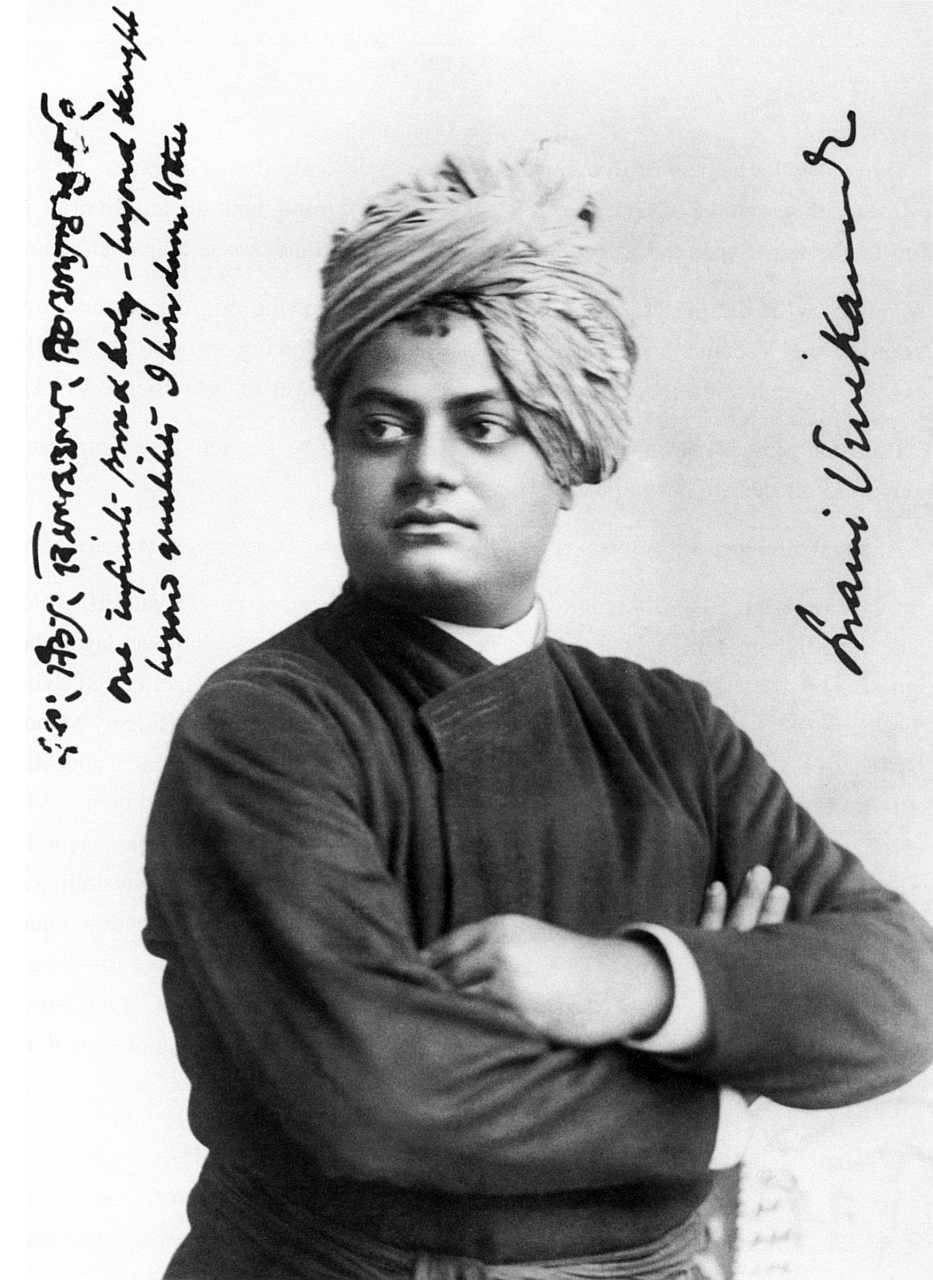
- First published in: December 1898
- Country: India
- Language: English

"To the Fourth of July" is an English poem written by Indian monk and social reformer Swami Vivekananda. Vivekananda wrote the poem on 4 July 1898 on the anniversary of the United States' independence.

In this poem, Vivekananda praised and glorified liberty, and the poem is described as a passionate utterance of his powerful longing for freedom. Coincidentally, Vivekananda himself died on 4 July 1902.

== Background ==
In 1893, Vivekananda went to the United States to represent India and Hinduism in the Parliament of the World's Religions. After getting overwhelming success in the Parliament, from 1893 to 1897 he travelled through the United States and England, and gave a series of lectures on religion and Vedanta. He returned to India in 1897 and travelled extensively there between 1897 and 1899, visiting many states.

In 1898, he went to Kashmir, where he stayed on a houseboat on Dal Lake. While travelling in Kashmir with some American and English disciples, Vivekananda wrote this poem on 4 July 1898, as a part of a celebration of the anniversary of the United States' independence and asked it be read aloud during that day's breakfast.

== Poem ==
To The Fourth of July (excerpt)

Behold, the dark clouds melt away,
That gathered thick at night, and hung
So like a gloomy pall above the earth!
Before thy magic touch, the world
Awakes. The birds in chorus sing.
The flowers raise their star-like crowns—
Dew-set, and wave thee welcome fair.
The lakes are opening wide in love
Their hundred thousand lotus-eyes
To welcome thee, with all their depth.
All hail to thee, thou Lord of Light!

- Read the full poem at Wikisource

== Theme ==
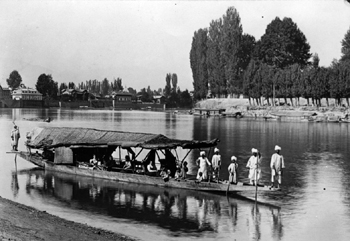
Swami Vivekananda in Kashmir in 1898.

The poem addresses and glorifies America's liberty. In the poem, Vivekananda used two different words: "freedom" and "liberty". The poem reflects the poet's powerful urge for liberty, and it has been described as a passionate utterance of his powerful longing for freedom. According to author Carebanu Cooper though, Vivekananda addressed the Fourth of July in this poem, but the poem presented "a blending of the concrete and the abstract responses to a national event and to eternal concepts."

In this poem, Vivekananda beholds the dark clouds are melting away, and a new day has come – a day of liberty. He also gives a detailed description of the bright new day. In the last lines of the poem, he prays for "freedom" for every country, every man and woman of the earth.
