= On Being a Christian =

Book by Hans Küng

- Author: Hans Küng
- Genre: Religion
- Publication date: 1974

On Being a Christian is a 1974 work of Christian theology by Hans Küng.

== Content ==
The author describes what is common among the various Christian communities and discussed the reasons a person would choose to believe in Christianity. The book focuses on the life and teaching of Jesus Christ and the nature of his divinity.

"Those for whom this book is written" by Hans Küng:

"This book is written for all those who, for any reason at all, honestly and sincerely want to know what Christianity, what being a Christian, really means. It is written also for those who do not believe, but nevertheless seriously inquire; who did believe, but are not satisfied with their unbelief; who do believe, but feel insecure in their faith; who are at a loss, between belief and unbelief; who are skeptical, both about their convictions and about their doubts. It is written then for Christians and atheists, Gnostics and agnostics, pietists and positivists, lukewarm and zealous Catholics, Protestants, and Orthodox...."

== Reactions ==
"May well become a religious and spiritual classic" - The New York Times

"Küng's compendium of doctrine is innovative and stimulating... he is no ordinary theologian" - Time Magazine

"Küng provides a skillfully argued, theologically nuanced and personally appropriate set of arguments for the liberating power of Christianity." - The Washington Post

Certain aspects of the book were criticized by the Conference of the German Bishops in 1975 for its apparent lack of doctrinal orthodoxy.
