= Islam: Past, Present and Future =

Book by Hans Küng

- Author: Hans Küng
- Publisher: One World Publications
- Publication date: 2013
- ISBN: 978-1851686124

Islam: Past, Present and Future (2007) is a book by prominent theologian Hans Küng, and is a lengthy analysis of Islam's 1,400-year history. The book is the final in his trilogy on the three monotheistic faiths, following Judaism: Between Yesterday and Tomorrow (1991) and Christianity: Its Essence and History (1994).
