= Gaston Bonet-Maury =

French Protestant historian

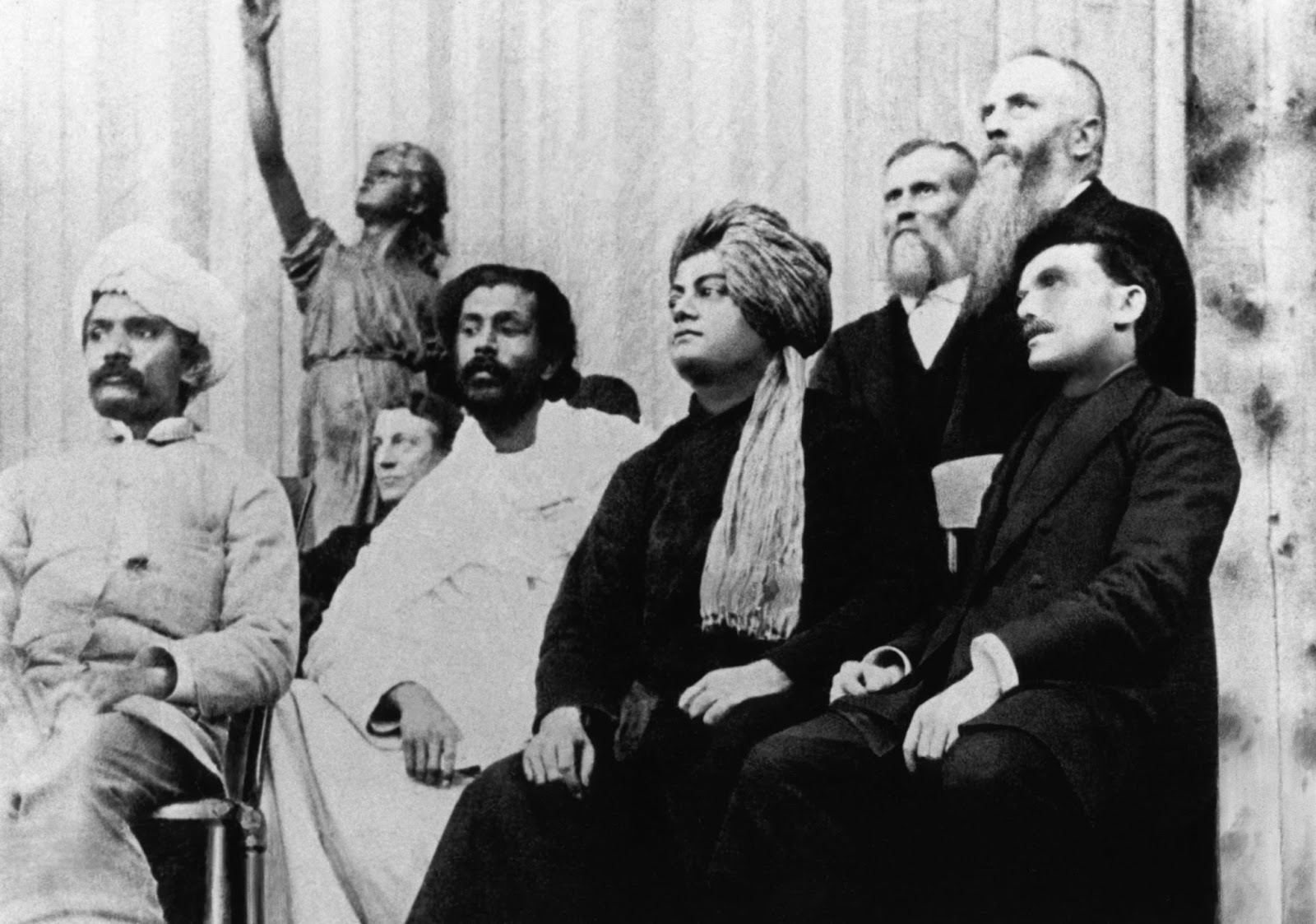
At the Parliament of World Religions, Chicago, Sept. 1893. From left to right: Virchand Gandhi, Anagarika Dharmapala, Swami Vivekananda, and A. G. Bonet-Maury.(possibly)

Amy Gaston Charles Auguste Bonet-Maury (2 January 1842, Paris – 20 June 1919, Paris) was a French Protestant historian.

He studied at the University of Strasbourg, graduating 1867, then was a Protestant pastor at Dordrecht, 1869–1872; followed by Beauvais, 1872–1876, and Saint-Denis, 1877. He then became lecturer, then professor of church history at the newly opened Protestant Faculty of Theology in Paris in the buildings of the Collège Rollin.

He was fluent in English and maintained cordial links with the British and Foreign Unitarian Association, who on publication of his Des origines du christianisme unitaire chez les Anglais in 1881 commissioned an English translation. In 1893, Bonet-Maury spoke at the World's Parliament of Religions in Chicago delivering the lecture, The Leading Powers Shaping Religious Thought in France. In June 1901, he received an honorary Doctorate of Divinity from the University of Glasgow.

== Works ==
Letter by Gaston Bonet-Maury (1882)

- Histoire de la liberté de conscience en France, depuis l'Édit de Nantes jusqu'à Juillet, 1870.
- Des origines du christianisme unitaire chez les Anglais, 1881.
- Early sources of English Unitarian Christianity, by Gaston Bonet-Maury. Revised by the author and translated by Edward Potter Hall. With a preface by James Martineau. London, British and Foreign Unitarian Association, 1884.
- De l'unité morale des grands religions de la terre, 1894.
- Le Congrès des religions à Chicago en 1893, 1895.
