= Towards a Global Ethic: An Initial Declaration =

Ethics document

"Towards a Global Ethic: An Initial Declaration" is a 1993 document by members of the Parliament of the World's Religions that details ethical commitments shared by many of the world's religious, spiritual, and cultural traditions. It is the Parliament's signature document.

== History ==
At the request of the Council for a Parliament of the World's Religions, Hans Küng, President of the Foundation for a Global Ethic (Stiftung Weltethos), wrote an initial draft in consultation with fellow scholars and religious leaders. The Council's leaders and Trustees then worked on the draft in consultation with Küng and another extensive network of leaders and scholars from various religions and regions. Most notable in leading this effort were Daniel Gómez-Ibáñez, the Executive Director of the Council, and Thomas A. Baima, a member of the board of trustees.

In the summer of 1993, "The Global Ethic" was ratified as an official document of the Parliament of the World's Religions by a vote of its Trustees. It was then signed by more than 200 leaders from 40+ different faith traditions and spiritual communities during the Parliament's 1993 gathering in Chicago. Since 1993 leaders and individuals around the world continue to endorse the Global Ethic with their signatures. It has served as a common ground for people to discuss, to agree, and to cooperate for the good of all.

Later the Parliament decided to add a fifth directive. Led by Myriam Renaud, the Parliament's Global Ethic Project Director, a task force wrote an initial draft. After reflecting on 100+ pages of comments offered by scholars and religious leaders, the task force submitted a final draft to the Trustees for their vote. The fifth directive became official in July 2018.

On May 20, 2007, the founder of the Global Ethic Foundation, Hans Küng, received the Culture Award of German Freemasons (in German: Kulturpreis Deutscher Freimaurer) by hands of the German Grand Master Jens Oberheide who presented him as a "free and brave thinker" and a man who spoke "straight from our Masonic hearts".

== Fundamental ethical demands ==
The declaration identifies two fundamental ethical demands as its foundation. First: the Golden Rule: What you wish done to yourself, do to others, "a principle which is found and has persisted in many religious and ethical traditions of humankind of thousands of years." Second: every human being must be treated humanely.

== Shared directives ==
The two fundamental ethical demands are made concrete in five directives (initially four before the addition of the fifth in 2018 ), which are "convincing and practical for all women and men of good will, religious and non-religious". These directives are elaborated in the Global Ethic. They are commitments to a culture of:

- Non-violence and respect for life
- Solidarity and a just economic order
- Tolerance and a life of truthfulness
- Equal rights and partnership between men and women
- Sustainability and care for the Earth

== Other unique features ==
=== Things held in common ===
The Global Ethic acknowledges that significant differences distinguish various religions. The directives instead proclaim publicly those things that they hold in common and jointly affirm. Each tradition holds those things to be true on the basis of its own religious or ethical grounds.

=== References ===
No religious or theological terms appear in the Global Ethic.

=== Principles ===
Küng describes several working parameters: It should

- make a clear distinction between the ethical level and the purely legal or political level
- avoid duplicating the Universal Declaration of Human Rights (because an ethic is more than rights)
- avoid political declarations
- avoid casuistry
- forego any attempt to craft a philosophical treatise
- avoid religious proclamations.

On a positive programmatic level, the declaration must:

- penetrate to the level of binding values, irrevocable criteria, and attitudes
- secure moral unanimity and steer clear of statements rejected by participants
- offer constructive criticism
- relate to the world as it really is
- use language familiar to newspaper readers (avoid jargon)
- have a religious foundation since, for religious people, an ethic must have a religious foundation

== See also ==
- Hans Küng
- Parliament of the World's Religions
- Universal Declaration of Human Rights
- Rights
- Casuistry
- Treatise
- Buddhism
- Hinduism
- Sustainability
- Earth
- Leonard Swidler
- Myriam Renaud
