= Hans Küng =

Swiss Catholic priest, theologian, and author (1928–2021)

The Reverend Hans Küng
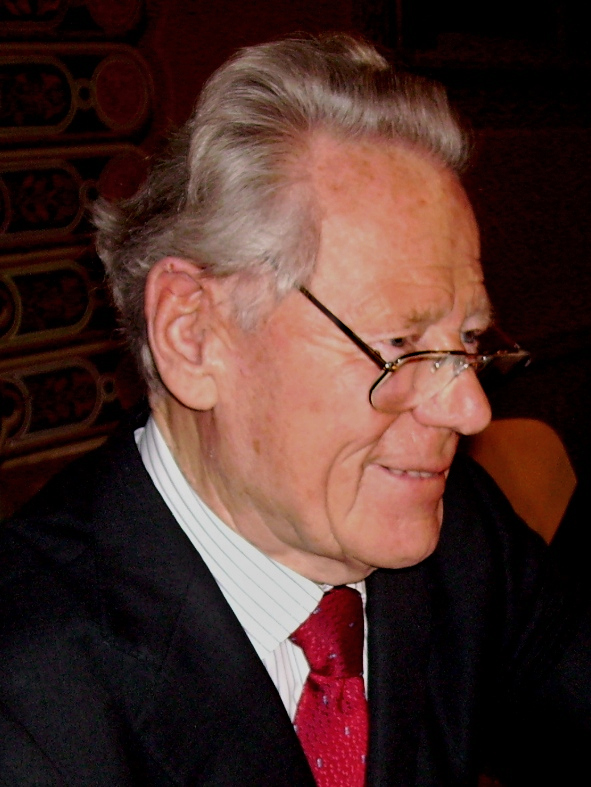
- Küng in 2009
- Born: Hans Küng; 19 March 1928; Sursee, Canton of Lucerne, Switzerland
- Died: 6 April 2021 (aged 93); Tübingen, Germany
- Education: Pontifical Gregorian University Institut Catholique de Paris University of Tübingen
- Occupations: Catholic priest; Academic; Writer

Signature
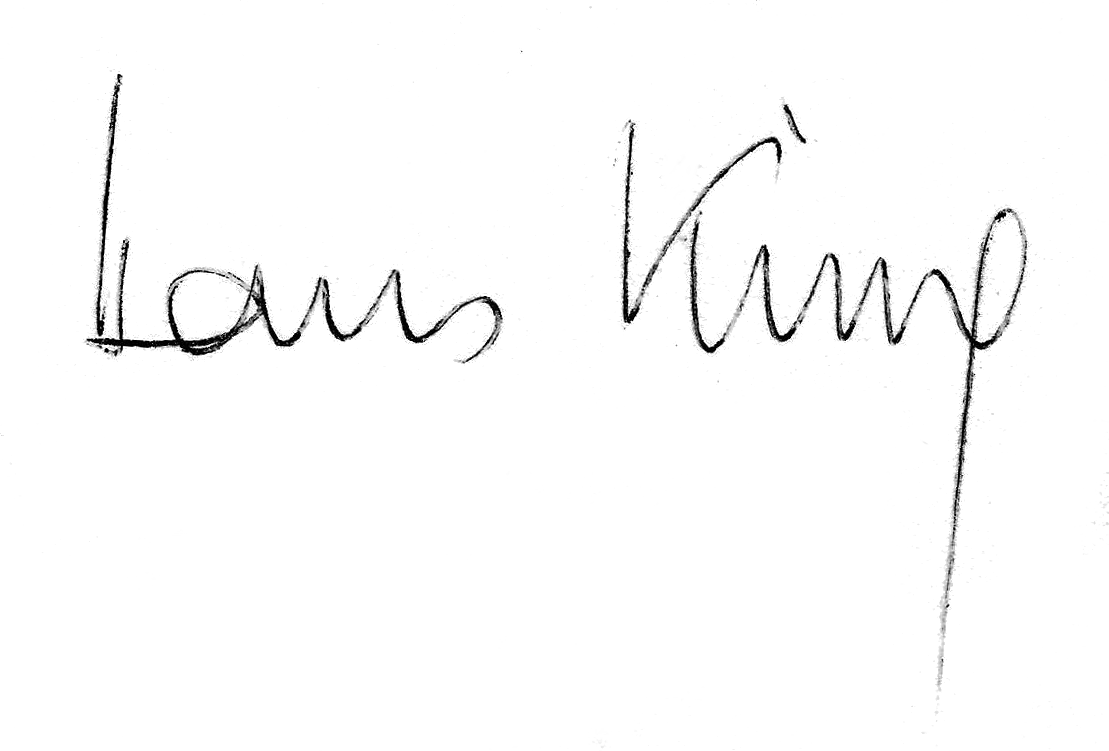

Hans Küng (German: [ˈhans ˈkʏŋ]; 19 March 1928 – 6 April 2021) was a Swiss Catholic priest, theologian, and author. He was a leading and often controversial figure in modern Catholic thought, known for his critique of papal infallibility and his advocacy of a re-examination of Catholic doctrine. He served as a theological adviser (peritus) at the Second Vatican Council (1962–1965) and was Professor of Ecumenical Theology at the University of Tübingen from 1960 until his retirement in 1996.

His views led to prolonged conflict with Church authorities, and in 1979 the Vatican revoked his authorization to teach Catholic theology. Küng later focused on interreligious dialogue and global ethics, serving as president of the Foundation for a Global Ethic from 1995. He remained a Catholic priest throughout his life and received numerous honors, including the Otto Hahn Peace Medal in 2008.

== Life and work ==
=== Education ===
Küng was born in Sursee, Canton of Lucerne. He was the eldest of seven siblings; his father managed a shoe store. He studied philosophy and theology at the Pontifical Gregorian University in Rome and was ordained in 1954. He said his first Mass in St. Peter's Basilica preaching to the Swiss guard, many of whom he knew personally. He continued his education in various European institutions, including the Sorbonne and the Institut Catholique de Paris, where he obtained a doctorate in theology in 1957. He then did pastoral work in Lucerne for two years. At the invitation of Karl Barth, he delivered a lecture on the prospects for reform of the Catholic Church—he was very optimistic—just a week before Pope John XXIII announced his plans for a council in January 1959.

=== Career ===
Küng taught for a year at the University of Münster and, in 1960, was appointed professor of fundamental theology at the University of Tübingen in Germany. He launched his writing career that same year with The Council, Reform and Reunion in which he outlined much of what became the program of the upcoming council; it proved a bestseller in several countries. In 1962 he was appointed peritus to the Second Vatican Council by Pope John XXIII. At 34, he was one of the Council's youngest periti. He served as an expert theological advisor to participants in the Council until its conclusion in 1965. At Küng's instigation, the Catholic faculty at Tübingen appointed another peritus, Joseph Ratzinger, the future Pope Benedict XVI, as professor of dogmatic theology.

During a 1963 tour of the United States, Küng gave the lecture "The Church and Freedom" to audiences of more than 25,000 at several universities around the country, but was not allowed to appear at the Catholic University of America. (Note: Küng was one of four proposed speakers whom Catholic University rector William J. McDonald refused to invite when proposed by the graduate student council; John Courtney Murray was one of the others. The resulting publicity in both the Catholic and secular press helped make Küng's tour a success.) He received the first of many honorary doctorates from the Jesuits' St. Louis University that year, but the school was chastised for not getting Rome's permission to do so. In April 1963, he accepted an invitation to visit John F. Kennedy at the White House, where Kennedy introduced him to a group of politicians saying "this is what I would call a new frontier man of the Catholic Church".

Küng's doctoral thesis was published in English in 1964 as Justification: The Doctrine of Karl Barth. (Note: The original French title was Justification. La doctrine de Karl Barth et une réflexion catholique.) It identified a number of areas of agreement between Karl Barth’s theology and Catholic theologies of justification, concluding that the differences were not fundamental and did not warrant a division in the Church. The book included a letter from Karl Barth stating that he agreed with Küng’s representation of his theology; however, Barth did not agree with Küng’s conclusion that the Reformation was an overreaction. In the book, Küng argued that Barth, like Martin Luther, had overreacted against the Catholic Church, which, despite its imperfections, has been and remains the body of Christ. Veteran newsperson Patricia Lefevere, writing for the National Catholic Reporter, says the Holy Office "opened a secret file (the infamous 399/57i) on Küng shortly after he wrote [this book]".

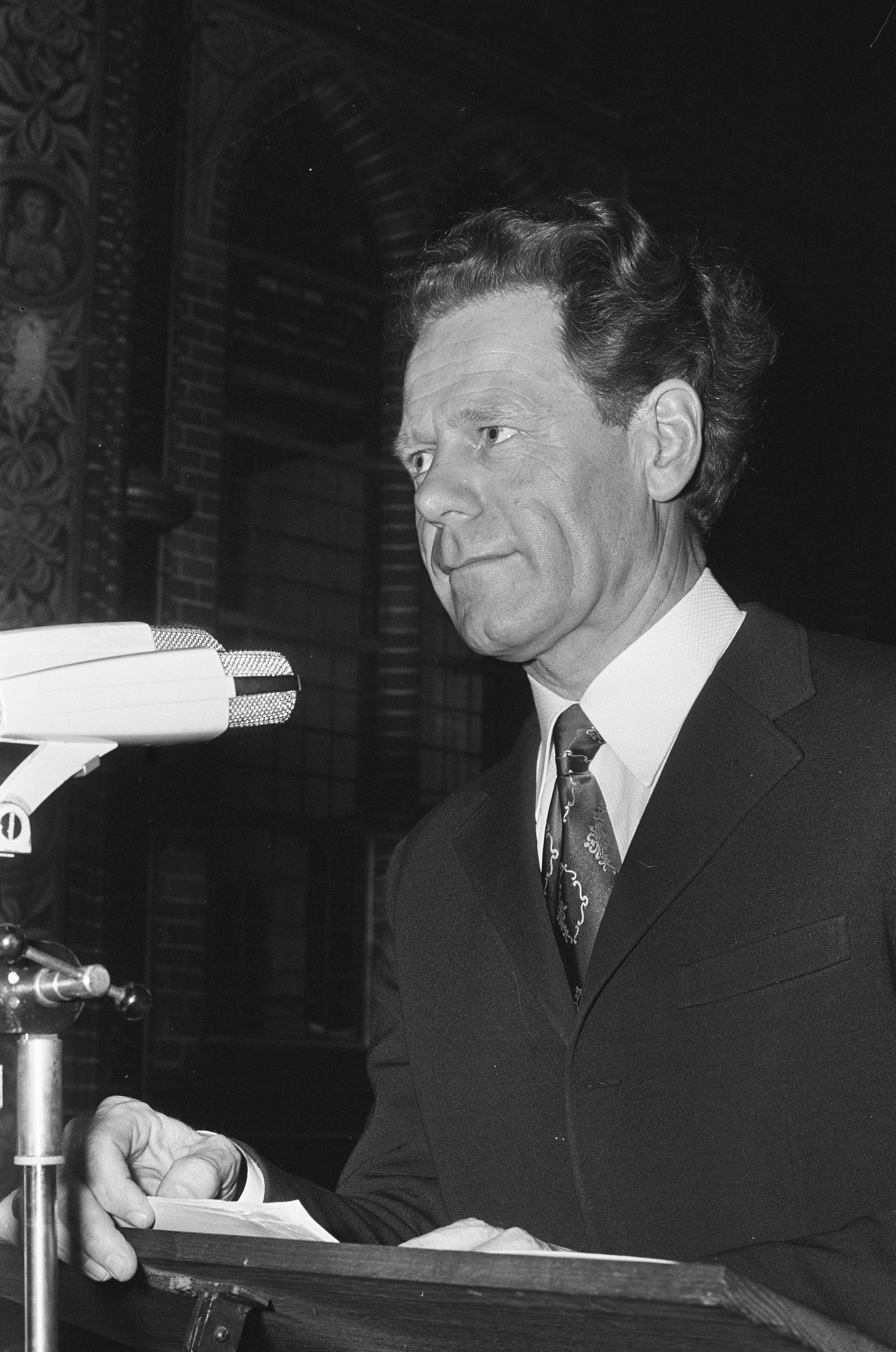
Küng in 1973

In the late 1960s, he became the first major Catholic theologian since the late 19th century Old Catholic Church schism to publicly reject the doctrine of papal infallibility in his book Infallible? An Inquiry (1971). It was published three years after the Vatican had first asked Küng to address accusations against his earlier volume, The Church. After the publication of Infallible, Vatican officials requested he appear in Rome to answer charges. Küng stood his ground, demanding to see the file the church had amassed and to speak with whoever was evaluating his work. But Küng had also criticized clerical celibacy in the Catholic Church, wanted to open the clergy and the diaconate to women, called the ban on dispensations for priests who wanted to leave the priesthood "a violation of human rights", and had written that current Catholic practices "contradicted the Gospel and ancient Catholic tradition and ought to be abolished". On 18 December 1979, he was stripped of his license to teach as a Catholic theologian. Sixty American and Canadian theologians protested the Vatican action and contradicted the Vatican's ruling by saying: "We publicly affirm our recognition that he is indeed a Roman Catholic theologian." (Note: The digital version of the New York Times report introduces several errors, rendering Küng's name as Kling, Kting, Ming, Kung, and Kiing. An image of the original story as it appeared in print is also available.) A thousand students at Tübingen held a candlelight vigil in protest. Küng later described the Vatican's ruling as "my personal experience of the Inquisition". Lefevere writes that:

In Disputed Truth, [the second] of his three volumes of memoirs, Küng spent 80 pages reviewing charges against him — secret meetings by German bishops and Vatican officials outside of Germany, betrayal by seven of his 11 Tübingen colleagues, and a near physical and emotional breakdown caused by exhaustion from his efforts to answer Vatican accusations while preserving his place in a state university.

He remained a priest. Since he could no longer teach on Tübingen's Catholic faculty, the university removed the Institute for Ecumenical Research, which Küng had founded and had headed since the 1960s, along with his professorship, outside of that faculty's jurisdiction. Küng continued to teach as a tenured professor of ecumenical theology until his retirement in 1996.

While a guest professor at the University of Chicago for three months in 1981, he was invited to only one Catholic institution, the University of Notre Dame. He appeared on The Phil Donahue Show. In October 1986, he participated in the Third Buddhist–Christian Theological Encounter held at Purdue University, West Lafayette, Indiana. Küng said his inter-faith studies "solidified his own roots in a living faith in Christ" which he said lasted his entire career. "Indeed, Küng long held that steadfastness in one's own faith and a capacity for dialogue with those of another belief are complementary virtues".

In the early 1990s, Küng initiated a project called Weltethos ("Global Ethic"), which is an attempt at describing what the world's religions have in common (rather than what separates them) and at drawing up a minimal code of rules of behaviour that everyone can accept. His vision of a global ethic was embodied in the document Towards a Global Ethic: An Initial Declaration. This Declaration was signed at the 1993 Parliament of the World's Religions by religious and spiritual leaders from around the world. Later Küng's project would culminate in the United Nations Year of Dialogue Among Civilizations (2001) to which Küng was assigned as one of 19 "eminent persons". Even though it was completed shortly after the terrorist attacks of 9/11 (in September 2001), it was not covered in the U.S. media, a fact about which Küng complained.

In 1986, he met in person with Charles Curran, a theologian who was then being threatened with the loss of his license to teach as a Catholic theologian. He encouraged Curran to continue his work and shared his experience of support and betrayal by his colleagues. In the 1990s, Küng spoke out on behalf of fellow Catholic theologian Eugen Drewermann who lost his license to teach Catholic theology and was suspended as a priest because he, like Küng, challenged dogmatic structures. Küng delivered the laudatio when Drewermann was awarded the Herbert-Haag-Prize for Freedom in the Church in 1992 at the University of Tübingen. Years later when the possible beatification of Pope John Paul II was under consideration, Küng objected that his was "an authoritarian pontificate which suppressed the rights of both women and theologians". He said John Paul's treatment of Latin American liberation theologians like Gustavo Gutiérrez and Leonardo Boff was unchristian.

In March 1991, he gave a talk titled "No Peace Among Nations until Peace Among the Religions" at UCSD's Price Center. He visited the nearby Beth El synagogue and spoke there on modern German–Jewish relations.

In 2003, Küng saw the beatification of Pope Pius IX as evidence of the degeneration of canonizations to "gestures of church politics".

Küng made more than a dozen attempts to meet with Pope John Paul II without success. On 26 September 2005, he had a friendly discussion over dinner at Castel Gandolfo with Pope Benedict XVI, avoiding topics of obvious disagreement and focusing instead of Küng's interreligious and cultural work. The pope acknowledged his efforts to contribute to a renewed recognition of crucial human moral values in dialogue between religions as well as with secular reason. (Note: im Dialog der Religionen wie in der Begegnung mit der säkularen Vernunft zu einer erneuerten Anerkennung der wesentlichen moralischen Werte der Menschheit beizutragen) Küng reported that Benedict himself authored the Vatican's statement about their meeting; he said "I approved every word".

In a 2009 interview with Le Monde, Küng sharply criticised Pope Benedict for lifting the excommunications of four bishops of the Society of Saint Pius X. He blamed the pope's lifelong isolation from contemporary society and said that as a consequence of Benedict's desire for a smaller and purer church "the church risks becoming a sect". His remarks drew a rebuke from Cardinal Angelo Sodano, dean of the College of Cardinals.

In April 2010, he published an open letter to all Catholic bishops in which he criticized Pope Benedict's handling of liturgical, collegial, and inter-religious issues and also the sexual abuse scandals in the Catholic Church. He further called on bishops to consider six proposals, ranging from speaking up and working on regional solutions to calling for another Vatican council.

He was a signatory of Church 2011, "The Need for a New Beginning", a German-language memorandum demanding reform of the Catholic Church that was promulgated by Catholic theology professors.

Küng died at home in Tübingen on 6 April 2021 at the age of 93. The Pontifical Academy for Life tweeted: "Disappears a great figure in the theology of the last century, whose ideas and analyzes [sic] must always make us reflect on the Catholic Church, the Churches, the society, the culture." His fellow theologian Charles Curran, who had experienced similar treatment by the Vatican, described Küng as "the strongest voice for reform in the Catholic Church during the last 60 years" and wrote that he was so prolific that "I do not know of anyone who was ever able to even read all that he had written."

In October 2021 Inge Jens, widow of Küng's close friend and colleague Walter Jens, confirmed that he had a life partner, who lived in his house.

=== Works ===
In On Being a Christian (1974), Küng traces Christianity to its roots, extensively using modern scholarship to extract from the Gospels what can be known of the historical Jesus. Rather than beginning with the teaching of Church councils and the highly developed theological propositions propounded from human authorities, he asked if an alternative were possible: "Would it not perhaps correspond more to the New Testament evidence and to modern man's historical way of thinking if we started out like the first disciples from the real human being Jesus, his historical message and manifestation, his life and fate, his historical reality and historical activity, and then ask about the relationship of this human being Jesus to God, about his unity with the Father?"

In 1998, he published Dying with Dignity, co-written with Walter Jens, in which he affirmed acceptance of euthanasia from a Christian viewpoint.

In 2005, Küng published a critical article in Italy and Germany on "The failures of Pope Wojtyla" in which he argued that the world had expected a period of conversion, reform, and dialogue but, instead, John Paul II offered a restoration of the pre-Vatican II status, blocking reform and inter-church dialogue, and reasserting the absolute dominion of Rome.

Based on his Studium Generale lectures at Tübingen University, in Der Anfang aller Dinge (The beginning of all things) he discussed the relationship between science and religion. In an analysis ranging from quantum physics to neuroscience, he also commented on the debate about evolution in the United States, dismissing those opposed to the teaching of evolution as "naive [and] un-enlightened".

In his 2010 book Was ich glaube, he described his own personal relationship with nature, and how he learned to observe it correctly, which meant drawing strength from God's creation without falling victim to a false and fanatic love of nature.

In 2013, Küng wrote in Erlebte Menschlichkeit ("Experienced Humanity") that he believed people had the right to end their own lives if physical illness, pain, or dementia made living unbearable. He indicated he was considering the option of assisted suicide for himself because he was suffering from Parkinson's disease and was losing the ability to see and write. Küng wrote that he did not wish to follow the example of Pope John Paul II.

== Awards and honors ==
- 1991 Swiss culture prize
- 1992 Karl Barth prize
- 1998 Theodor Heuss Foundation prize
- 1998 Interfaith gold medallion from the International Council of Christianity and Judaism, London
- 1999 Federation of Lutheran cities prize
- 2003 Knight Commander's Cross of the Order of Merit of the Federal Republic of Germany
- 2005 Niwano Peace Prize
- 2005 Baden-Württemberg medal
- 2006 Lew Kopelew Prize
- 2007 German freemasonry cultural prize
- 2007 Honorary Citizen of City of Tübingen
- 2008 Honour for civil courage by the circle of friends Heinrich Heine (Düsseldorf)
- 2008 Otto Hahn Peace Medal in Gold from the United Nations Association of Germany (DGVN) in Berlin, for "outstanding services to peace and international understanding, especially for his exemplary employment for humanity, tolerance and the dialogue between the great world religions"
- 2009 Abraham Geiger prize from the Abraham-Geiger-Kolleg at the University of Potsdam
- 2017 Asteroid 190139 Hansküng, discovered by astronomer Vincenzo Casulli in 2005, was named in his honor. The official naming citation was published by the Minor Planet Center on 12 March 2017 (M.P.C. 103971).

=== Honorary doctorates ===
- Dr. h.c. (LL.D.) Saint Louis University (1963)
- Dr. h.c. (D.D.) Pacific School of Religion, Berkeley/California (1966)
- Dr. h.c. (HH.D.) Loyola University Chicago (1970)
- Dr. h.c. (D.D.) University of Glasgow (1971)
- Dr. h.c. (LL.D) University of Toronto (1984)
- Dr. h.c. (D.D.) University of Cambridge/UK (1985)
- Dr. h.c. (L.H.D.) University of Michigan, Ann Arbor (1985)
- Dr. h.c. (D.D.) University of Dublin/Ireland (1995)
- Dr. h.c. (D.D.) University of Wales, Swansea (1999)
- Dr. h.c. (LHD) Ramapo College New Jersey (1999)
- Dr. h.c. (LHD) Hebrew Union College-Jewish Institute of Religion, Cincinnati (2000)
- Dr. h.c. (D.D.) Florida International University (2002)
- Dr. h.c. (D.D.) Ecumenical Theological Seminary in Detroit/US (2003)
- Dr. h.c. University of Genoa (2004)
- Dr. h.c. Universidad Nacional de Educación a Distancia in Madrid (2011)

== References in popular culture ==
- In The Nonborn King by Julian May, the third book in the Saga of Pliocene Exile, a minor character, Sullivan-Tonn, is referred to as having once been "Küng Professor of Moral Theology at Fordham University"
- Küng is the favorite theologian of Cedar Hawk Songmaker in Future Home of the Living God by Louise Erdrich.

== Writings ==
=== English translations ===
- Justification: The Doctrine of Karl Barth and a Catholic Reflection, (org. 1964), (40th Ann. Ed. 2004), Westminster John Knox Press, ISBN 0-664-22446-6
- The Council and Reunion (1960), London: Sheed and Ward ISBN 978-1-125-18571-1
- Structures of the Church (1962), New York: Thomas Nelson and Sons ISBN 978-0-8245-0508-0
- That the World May Believe (1963), New York: Sheed and Ward ISBN 978-1-135-10020-9
- The Living Church: Reflections on the Second Vatican Council (1963), London: Sheed and Ward. In the U.S.A., published as The Council in Action: Theological Reflections on the Second Vatican Council (1963), New York: Sheed and Ward ASIN B000GYKPTQ
- The Church (1967), London: Burns and Oates ISBN 978-0-223-97696-2
- Infallible? An Inquiry (1971), ISBN 0-385-18483-2
- Why Priests? (1971), Collins ISBN 978-0-00-624502-5
- What must remain in the Church (1973), London: Collins ISBN 978-0-00-624913-9
- On Being a Christian (1974) ISBN 978-0-00-625152-1
- Signposts for the Future: Contemporary Issues facing the Church (1978), ISBN 0-385-13151-8, 204 pages
- Freud and the Problem of God: Enlarged Edition, Edward Quinn (translator), ISBN 0-300-04723-1, 126 pages, Yale University Press
- Does God Exist? An Answer For Today (1980) ISBN 0-8245-1119-0
- Art and the Question of Meaning (1980, translated 1981) E. Quinn, Crossroads New York ISBN 0-8245-0016-4
- Eternal Life : Life after Death As a Medical, Philosophical and Theological Program (1984), Edward Quinn (translator). Contents (scrollable) ISBN 0-385-19910-4, 271 pages. Garden City, New York: Doubleday & Co.
- Christianity and the world religions: paths of dialogue with Islam, Hinduism, and Buddhism (1986) ISBN 0-385-19471-4
- Christianity and Chinese Religions (with Julia Ching, 1988) ISBN 0-334-02545-1
- The Incarnation of God: An Introduction to Hegel's Theological Thought as Prolegomena to a Future Christology, J. R. Stephenson (translator) ISBN 0-567-09352-2, 601 pages, Crossroad Publishing Company
- Theology for the Third Millennium: An Ecumenical View (1990) (Translated by Peter Heinegg) ISBN 0-385-41125-1
- Global Responsibility: In Search of a New World Ethic (1991), New York: Crossroad. ISBN 978-0-8245-1102-9
- Credo. The Apostle's Creed Explained for Today (1993) SCM. ISBN 978-0-334-00151-5
- Judaism: Between Yesterday and Tomorrow (1992), New York: Crossroad ISBN 0-8264-0788-9
- Great Christian Thinkers (1994) ISBN 0-8264-0848-6
- Christianity : Its Essence and History (1995) ISBN 0-334-02571-0
- A Global Ethic for Global Politics and Economics (1997) ISBN 0-334-02686-5
- Dying with Dignity: A Plea for Personal Responsibility (1996, 1998), co-written with Walter Jens ISBN 0-8264-0885-0, ISBN 0-8264-1042-1
- The Catholic Church: A Short History (2001)
- Women and Christianity (2001, new ed. 2005), London: Continuum ISBN 978-0-8264-7690-6
- My Struggle for Freedom: Memoirs (2003), New York, London: Continuum ISBN 0-8264-7021-1
- Why I Am Still a Christian (2006) ISBN 978-0-8264-7698-2
- The Beginning of All Things – Science and Religion (2007) ISBN 978-0-8028-0763-2
- Islam: Past, Present and Future (2007) ISBN 978-1-85168-377-2
- Disputed Truth: Memoirs II (2008) New York: Continuum ISBN 978-0-8264-9910-3
- Can We Save The Catholic Church? (2013) London: ISBN 9780007522026

== See also ==
- Parliament of the World's Religions
- Towards a Global Ethic: An Initial Declaration
