= Virchand Gandhi =

Jain scholar who represented Jainism at the first World Parliament of Religions in 1893

Virachand Raghavji Gandhi
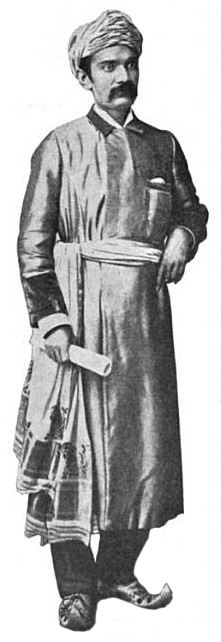
- Virchand Gandhi
- Born: 25 August 1864; Mahuva, Gujarat
- Died: 7 August 1901 (aged 36); Mahuwar, near Mumbai, India
- Education: University of Bombay
- Occupations: Lawyer, scholar on Jainism
- Known for: Representing Jainism at the first World Parliament of Religions, Chicago 1893
- Children: 1
- Parent: Raghav Tejpal Gandhi

Virachand Raghavji Gandhi (Note: In this Indian name, Raghavji is a patronymic and the family name is Gandhi.) (25 August 1864 – 7 August 1901) was a Jain scholar who represented Jainism at the first World Parliament of Religions in 1893. A barrister by profession, he worked to defend the rights of Jains, and wrote and lectured extensively on Jainism, other religions, and philosophy.

== Background and early accomplishments ==
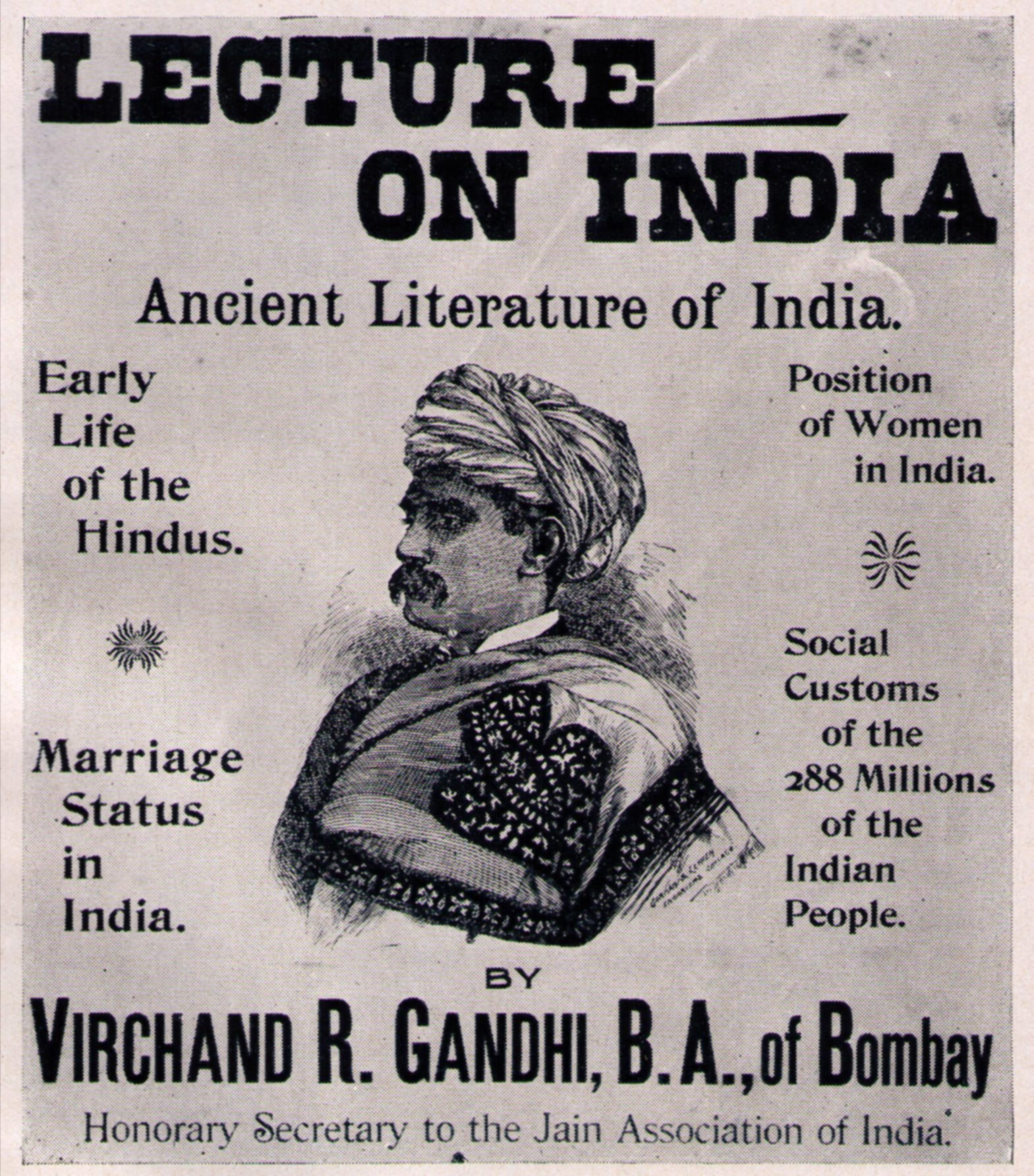
Poster announcing lecture by Virachand Gandhi

Gandhi was born on 25 August 1864 in Mahuva near Bhavnagar (now in Gujarat, India), to Mahuva Nagar Sheth and Raghavji Tejpalji Gandhi. His father, Raghavji, was a businessman. After completing primary and secondary school in Mahuva, Gandhi was sent to Bhavnagar for further studies. In 1879, Gandhi married Jiviben. At the age of sixteen, upon placing first on the Bhavanagar matriculation examination, he was awarded the ‘Shri Jaswant Singhji’ scholarship. Gandhi continued his education at Elphinstone College, of the University of Bombay. He graduated with honors in 1884, having earned a bachelor's degree in law. Gandhi was a polyglot who spoke fourteen languages, including Gujarati, Hindi, Bengali, English, Prakrit, Sanskrit, and French. Gandhi was a friend of Mahatma Gandhi, and joined Mahatma in his "experiments in dietetics" (vegetarianism). Virchand helped Mahatma in the latter's struggle to establish a legal practice.

In 1885, at the age of 21, he became the first honorary secretary of the Jain Association of India. During his term, he fought against a tax being levied by the ruler of Princely State of Palitana on pilgrims visiting Mount Shatrunjaya, Palitana. During the course of this fight Gandhi met Lord Reay, the British colonial governor of Bombay, and Colonel John Watson of the Kathiawar Agency. With the help of these two individuals, he ultimately negotiated an annual fixed payment of Rs. 15000, rather than an individual tax on each pilgrim. Gandhi also fought to close a pig slaughterhouse that had been started in 1891 close to Mount Shikharji, a holy place of Jain pilgrimage. Gandhi spent six months in Calcutta learning Bengali and preparing his case against the slaughterhouse. He was eventually successful in getting the slaughterhouse closed.

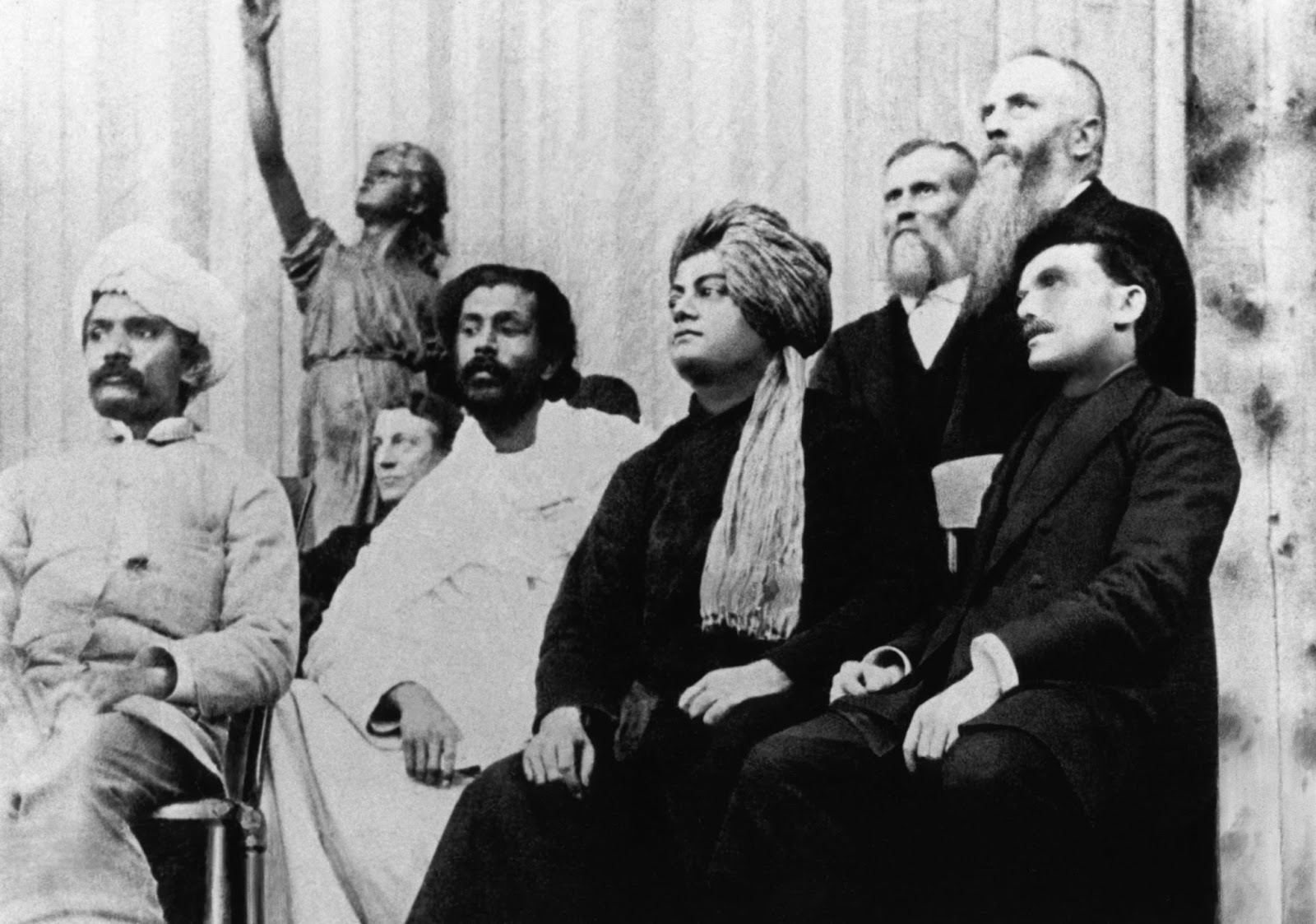
At the World Parliament of Religions. From left to right: Virchand Gandhi, Hewivitarne Dharmapala, Swami Vivekananda, and (possibly) G. Bonet Maury

== Trip to the World Parliament of Religions ==
Gandhi represented Jainism at the first World Parliament of Religions, held in Chicago in 1893. Śvetāmbara Jain Acharya Vijayanandsuri, also known as Acharya Atmaramji, had initially been invited to represent Jainism at the Parliament, but as Jain monks do not travel overseas, he could not attend. Atmaram recommended Gandhi to go in his stead and serve as the emissary for the religion. Atmaram and his disciple Vallabhsuri trained Gandhi for six months.

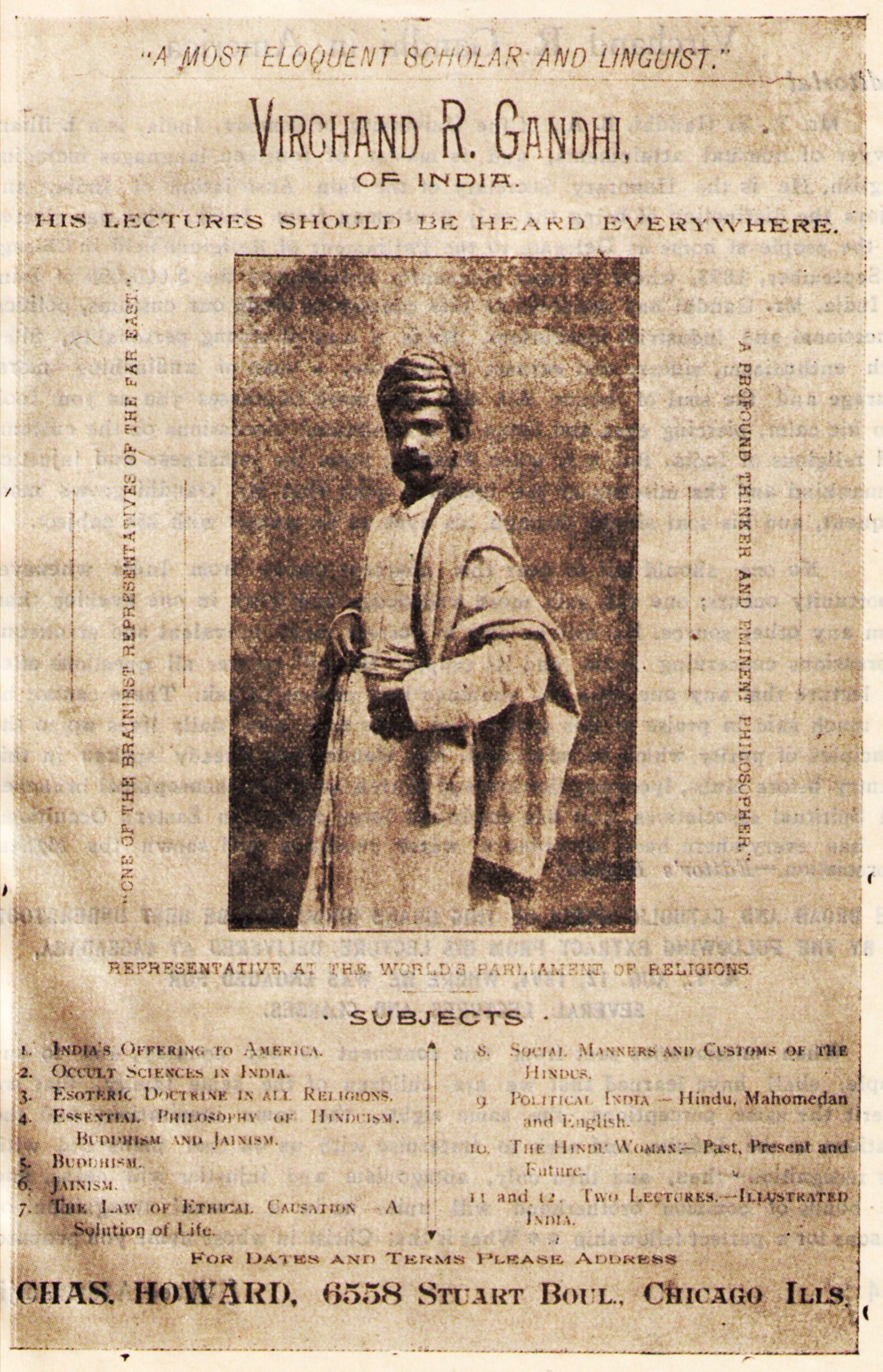
Poster calling Gandhi 'a most eloquent scholar and linguist'

Gandhi received a positive response at the Parliament and was asked to deliver more lectures. He ultimately stayed two years in the US and one year in the UK He went outside India to promote Jain values on two other occasions, and is known for giving about 535 lectures on Jainism and having attracted followers from outside India to Jainism. He was awarded various medals for his lectures.

He was a contemporary to Swami Vivekanand, who deeply admired him. He faced criticism over his sea voyage, which was at the time considered unholy. Vivekanand, impressed with Gandhi's adherence to vegetarianism in the face of the cold Chicago climate, came to his defence: in an 1894 letter to Haridas Viharidas Desai, Diwan of Junagadh, he wrote "Now here is Virchand Gandhi, the Jain whom you knew well in Bombay. This man never takes anything but mere vegetables even in this terribly cold climate and tooth and nail tries to defend his countrymen and the religion. The people of this country like him very well. But what are they doing who sent him over? They are trying to outcast him."

Herbert Warren, who studied Jainism under Gandhi and adopted the Jain religion, published a book on Gandhi's lectures titled Herbert Warren's Jainism.

The American newspaper, the Buffalo Courier, wrote regarding Gandhi, "of all Eastern scholars, it was this youth whose lectures on Jain Faith and Conduct was listened to with the greatest interest and attention". Later, in Kasadova, he delivered a lecture on 'Some Mistakes Corrected' on 8 August 1894, which prompted the citizens of the city to award him a gold medal.

Gandhi had studied Buddhism, Vedanta Philosophy, Christianity, and western philosophy. He praised Mughal Emperor Akbar for his equal treatment of all religions.

From Left to Right – Narasima Charya, Lakshmi Narain, Swami Vivekananda, Hewivitarne Dharmapala, Virachand Raghav Gandhi

Gandhi propagated the relevance of Jain tenets and Mahavira's message of nonviolence. He delivered about 535 speeches on Jainism, other religions, and social and cultural lives in India, all of which received wide publication. He was invited two more times, first in 1897, and then in 1899 to the West.

== Later life and death ==
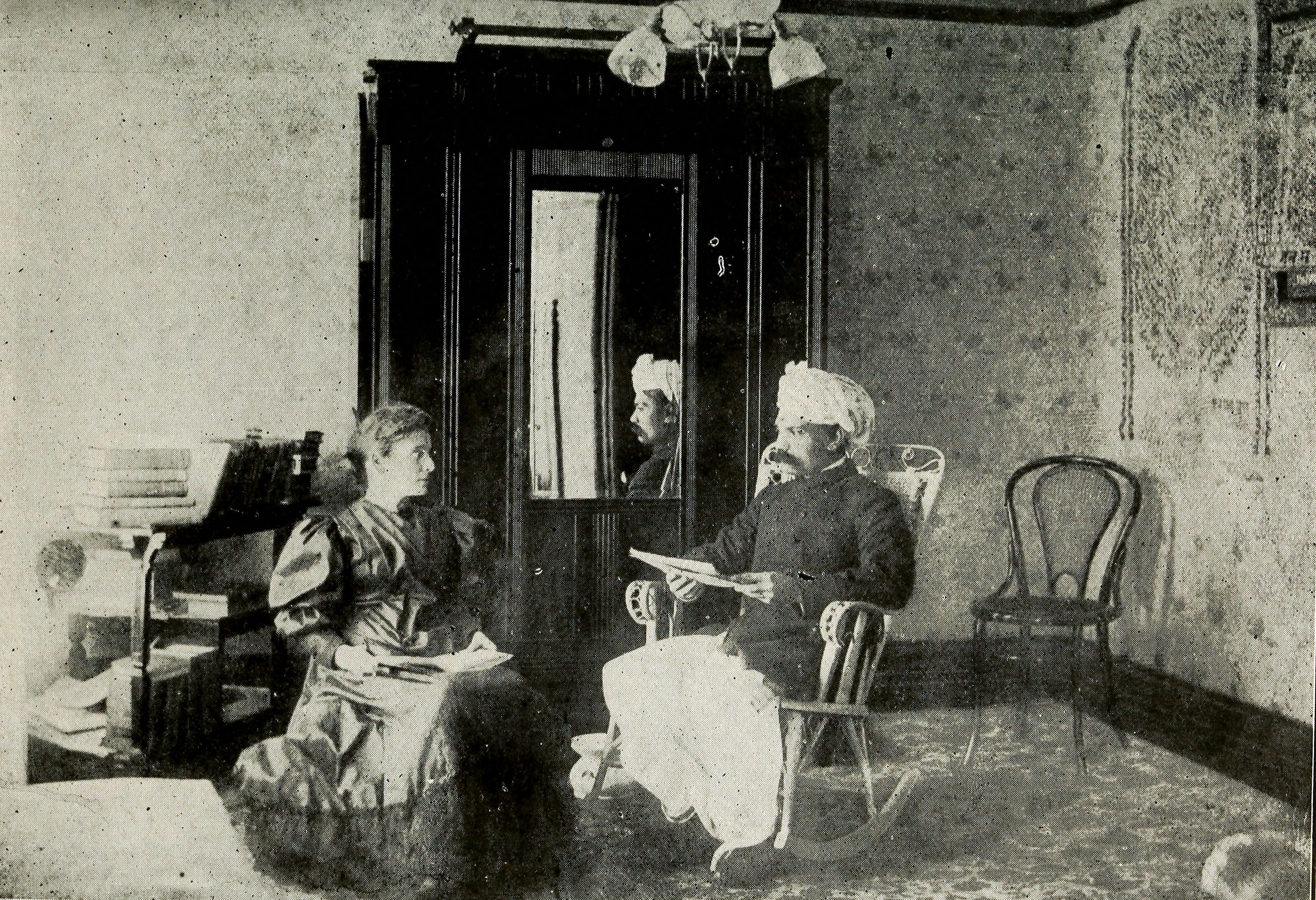
Virchand Gandhi teaching Jainism to a lady in US, 1893

Gandhi founded Gandhi Philosophical Society and the Society for the Education of Women in India (SEWI). He participated in Pune session of Indian National Congress in 1895 as a representative of Bombay state, and lectured on Indian politics and industry in Large Hall of William Science building on 19 December 1898. He also participated at the International Conference of Commerce in 1899 and represented Asia. He settled tax disputes of Palitana and Shikharji piggery case.

Gandhi died at the age of thirty-six of haemorrhaging of the lungs on 7 August 1901 at Mahuwar, near Mumbai, India.

== Works ==
- The Unknown Life of Jesus Christ: translation from French to English. It was a manuscript found in Tibet.
- The Life of Saint Iss
- Religion and philosophy of the Jainas

=== Collection ===
- Speeches and Writings of Virchand R. Gandhi, collected and edited by Bhagu F. Karbhari

== Recognition ==
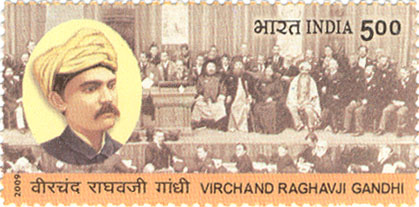
Postal Stamp by India post on 8 November 2009

- Gandhi was accorded both a welcome and honour by many literary and spiritual institutions, churches and societies. He was presented with medals.
- A museum was constructed and dedicated to Gandhi in 1964.
- In the 1990s, statues of Gandhi were erected in Chicago and Mahuva.
- He was remembered on 1993 Parliament of World religions.
- A drama based on his life, Gandhi Before Gandhi, was performed 200 times throughout the world.
- On 8 November 2009, the Indian Postal Department honoured him by issuing a postal stamp with his image.
- On 25 August 2013, his Saardh Janma Shatabdi Year celebrations commenced at Vallabh Vihar, Rohini Delhi under the aegis of Akhil Bhartiya Shree Atma Vallabh Jain Mahasangh, organised by Shree Atmanand Jain Sabha, Rohini, Delhi.
- On 17 August 2014, the concluding function was held at Thane in the august presence of Gachhadhipati Jainacharya Shree Vikay Nityanand Surishwer Ji. The programme was held under the banner of Shree Atma VAllabh Jain Mahasangh with Mr. Ashok Jain as the Programme Convenor who also made an elaborate presentation on the life and achievements of Shree Virchand Raghav Gandhi.
- As a befitting finale to the yearlong celebrations, One day programme was organised by Akhil Bhartiya Shree Atma Vallabh Jain Mahasangh, Vallabh Smarak Jain Mandir Tirth & Akhil Bhartiya Shree Jain Shwetamber Yuvak Mahasangh at Balyogi Auditorium in the Sansad Bhawan. Sh Ravisahnkar Prasead, Union Minister of Law & Justice, Information and Broadcasting & Information Technology presided the deliberations attended by 15 Members of Parliament and leading Jains from all over Indie. Gandhi Before Gandhi - a play on the life and ideals of Shri Virchand Raghav Gandhi was presented by Rangat Productions, Mumbai. Keynote presentation was made by Sh Ashok Jain, Programme Convenor and Hony Secretary of Vallabh Smarak Jain Mandir Tirth, Delhi.

== See also ==
- Champat Rai Jain
