= Parliament of the World's Religions =

Series of meetings intended to create a global interfaith dialogue

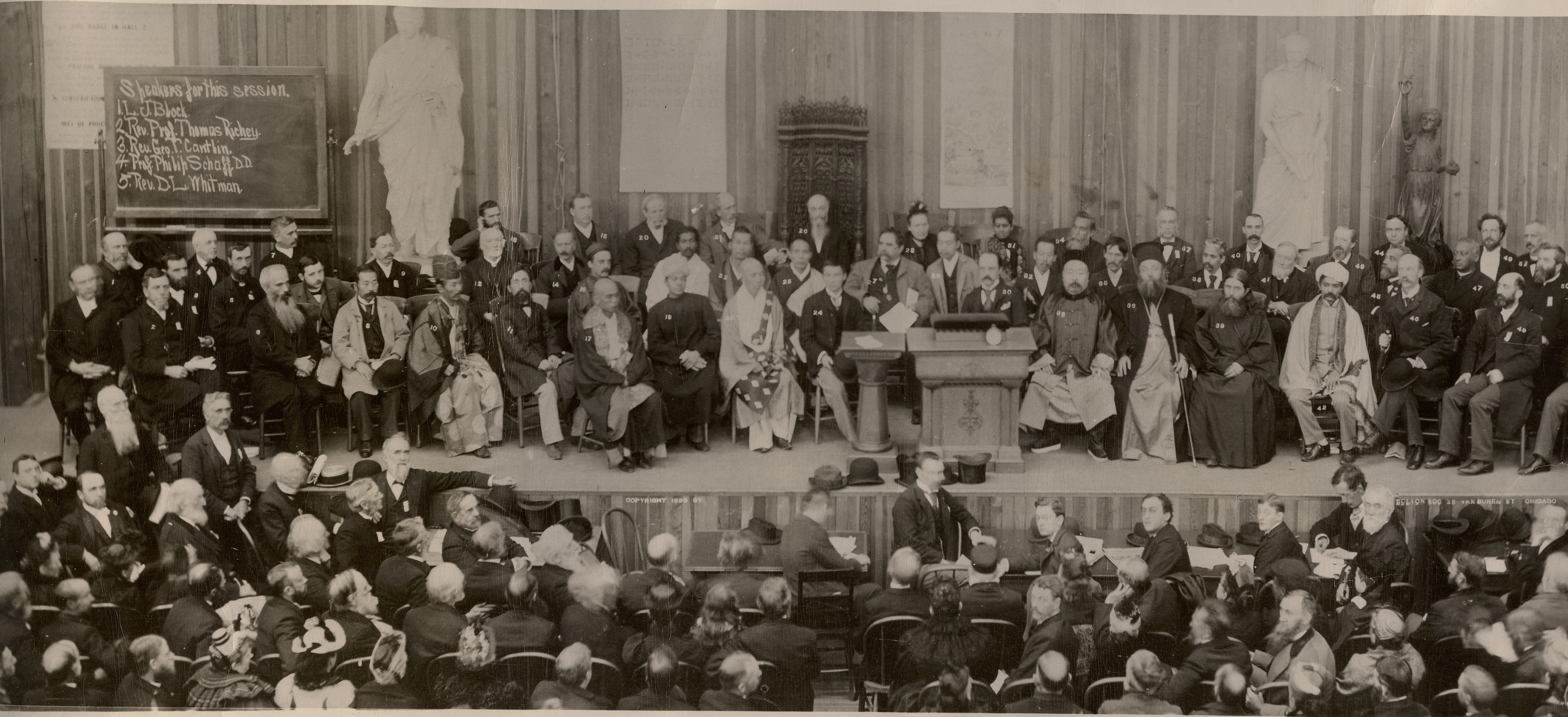
- Chicago meeting, 1893
- Status: Active
- Genre: Conference, exhibits
- Inaugurated: 11–16 September 1893 (Chicago)
- Previous event: 14–18 August 2023 (Chicago)
- Next event: TBD
- Website: parliamentofreligions.org

There have been several meetings referred to as a Parliament of the World's Religions, the first being the World's Parliament of Religions of 1893, which was an attempt to create a global dialogue of faiths. The original event was celebrated by another conference on its centenary in 1993. That led to a new series of conferences under the official title Parliament of the World's Religions, with the same objective of creating a global dialogue of faiths.

== Organization ==
The Parliament of the World's Religions was incorporated in 1989 to organize the centennial conference of the first Parliament. The Parliament is headquartered in Chicago, led by a board of trustees elected from various faiths.

== History ==
=== 1893 Parliament ===
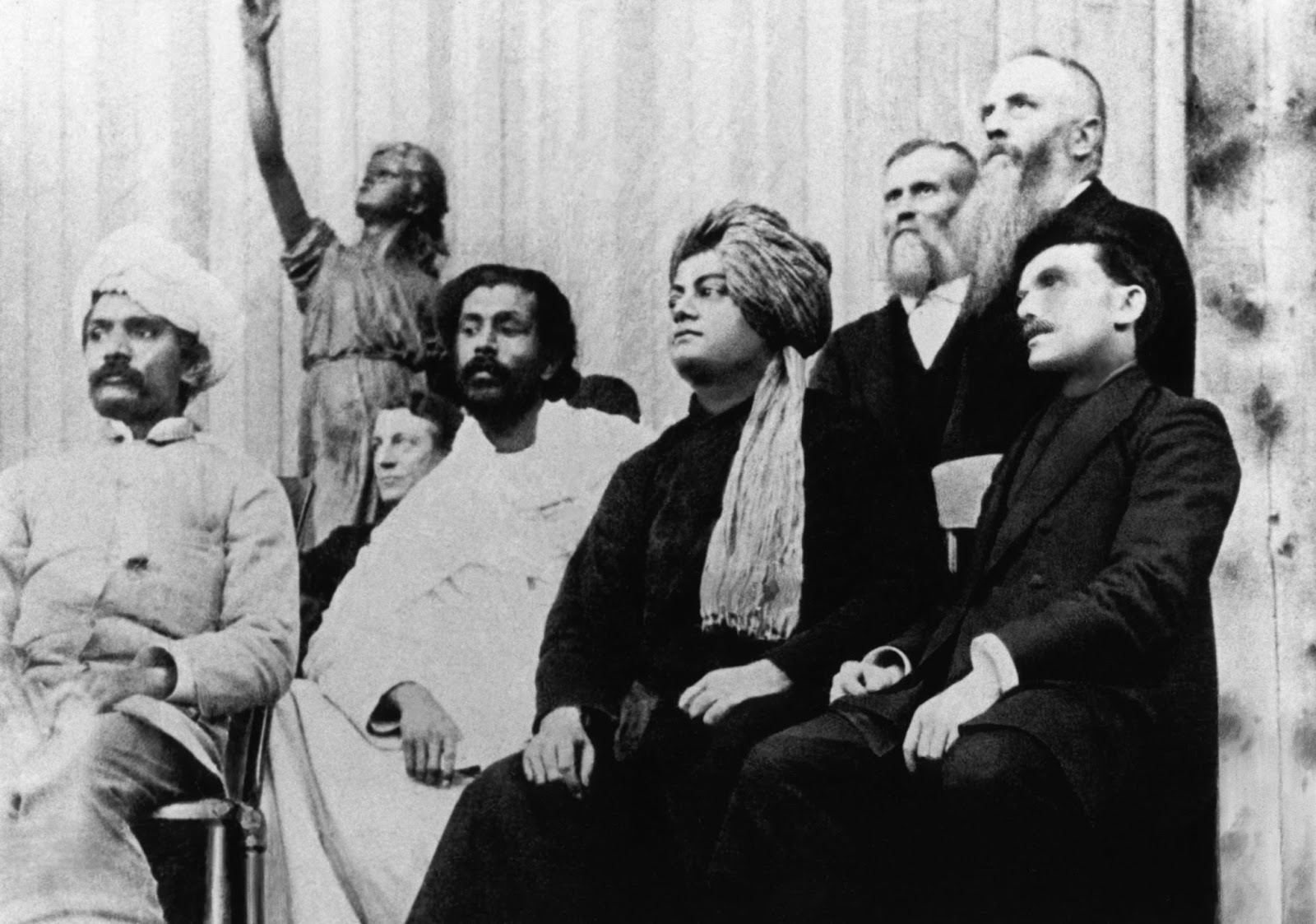
Parliament of Religions September 1893. On the platform (left to right) Virchand Gandhi, Anagarika Dharmapala, Swami Vivekananda and G. Bonet Maury

In 1893, the city of Chicago hosted the World Columbian Exposition, an early world's fair. So many people were coming to Chicago from all over the world that many smaller conferences, called Congresses and Parliaments, were scheduled to take advantage of this unprecedented gathering. One of these was the World's Parliament of Religions, an initiative of the Swedenborgian layman (and judge) Charles Carroll Bonney. Another principal organizer of the gathering was Unitarian minister Jenkin Lloyd Jones. The Parliament of Religions was by far the largest of the congresses held in conjunction with the Exposition. John Henry Barrows, a clergyman, was appointed as the first chairman of the General Committee of the 1893 Parliament by Charles Bonney.

The Parliament of Religions opened on 11 September 1893 at the World's Congress Auxiliary Building which is now The Art Institute of Chicago, and ran from 11 to 27 September, making it the first organized interfaith gathering. Today it is recognized as the birth of the worldwide interfaith movement, with representatives of a wide variety of religions and new religious movements.

==== Participants ====
- The Jain scholar and jurist Virchand Gandhi was invited as a representative of Jainism. Virchand talked about the doctrines of Jainism – code of conduct, way of life and cosmology in such an eloquent and coherent manner that Buffalo Courier, an American newspaper reported, "of all Eastern scholars, it was this youth whose lectures on Jain Faith and Conduct was listened to with the greatest interest and attention."
- The Sri Lankan Buddhist leader Anagarika Dharmapala was invited as a representative of "Southern Buddhism", the term applied at that time to the Theravada.
- Soyen Shaku, the "First American Ancestor" of Zen, attended from Japan.
- An essay by the Japanese Pure Land master Kiyozawa Manshi, "Skeleton of the Philosophy of Religion" was read in his absence.
- Swami Vivekananda, an Indian Hindu monk, represented Ancient Indian Religious Thought and Philosophy as a delegate, introducing Hinduism at the opening session of the Parliament on 11 September. Though initially nervous, he bowed to the goddess Saraswati mentally, then began his speech with salutation, "Sisters and brothers of America!". To these words he got a standing ovation from a crowd of thousands, which lasted for two minutes. When silence was restored he continued his address: "I thank you in the name of the most ancient order of monks in the world; I thank you in the name of the mother of religions; and I thank you in the name of millions and millions of Hindu people of all classes and sects."
- Christianity was represented by Gaston Bonet-Maury, a Protestant historian who was invited by Swami Vivekananda.
- Septimus J. Hanna read an address written by the founder of Christian Science, Mary Baker Eddy.
- Rabbi Kaufmann Kohler, a leader in the Reform Judaism movement, was a keynote speaker at the gathering, speaking about "Human Brotherhood as Taught by the Religions Based on the Bible."
- Islam was represented by Mohammed Alexander Russell Webb, an Anglo-American convert to Islam and the former US consular representative to the Philippines.
- Henry Jessup addressing the World Parliament of Religions was the first to publicly discuss the Baháʼí Faith in the United States (it had previously been known in Europe). Since then Baháʼís have become active participants.
- Theism or the Brahmo Samaj was represented by Protap Chunder Mozoomdar.
- The Theosophical Society was represented by the vice-president of the society, William Quan Judge and by activist Annie Besant.
- Gyanendra Nath Chakravarti (G. N. Chakravarti) was also a significant representative at the Parliament, advocating for Theosophy. His eloquent speeches and presence contributed to the interfaith dialogue and helped raise awareness of Indian spiritual traditions.
- Chinese religions were represented by Pung Quang Yu (Chinese: 彭光譽; pinyin: Peng Guangyu).
- Other new religious movements of the time, such as Spiritualism, were also represented.

Absent from this event were the Church of Jesus Christ of Latter-day Saints, who were not invited, Native American religious figures, Sikhs, and other Indigenous and Earth centered religionists; these religions and spiritual traditions were not represented until the 1993 Parliament convened.

==== Legacy ====
The 1893 Parliament had a lasting ripple effect. One striking example is its influence on Sarah Farmer, who established Greenacre in Eliot, Maine. After meeting with participants in the World Parliament of religions, she was inspired to dedicate the camp to the message of peace which is a principle she saw reflected in all the great religions. In 1894, representatives from at least seventeen faiths gathered at Greenacre and raised what is believed to be the world's first peace flag, symbolizing the ideal of harmonious living. Greenacre soon became a center for inter-religious learning, with figures like Swami Vivekananda and Anagarika Dharmapala visiting to teach and continue the Parliament's vision of spiritual conversation.

=== 1993 Parliament ===
Opening ceremony of the 1993 Parliament

In 1993, the Parliament convened at the Palmer House hotel in Chicago. Over 8,000 people from all over the world, from many diverse religions, gathered to celebrate, discuss and explore how religious traditions can work together on the critical issues which confront the world. A document, "Towards a Global Ethic: An Initial Declaration", mainly drafted by Hans Küng, set the tone for the subsequent ten days of discussion. This global ethic was endorsed by many of the attending religious and spiritual leaders who were part of the parliament assembly.

Also created for the 1993 parliament was a book, A Sourcebook for the Community of Religions, by the late Joel Beversluis, which has become a standard textbook in religion classes. Unlike most textbooks of religion, each entry was written by members of the religion in question.

The keynote address was given by the 14th Dalai Lama on the closing day of the assembly. The DIMMID hosted also a dialogue session with the Dalai Lama on "Emptiness and Kenosis" which was the inspiration for the Gethsemani Encounters at the Abbey of Our Lady of Gethsemani in 1996 and 2002. Cardinal Joseph Bernardin also participated at the parliament.

=== 1999 Parliament ===
More than 7,000 individuals from over 80 countries attended 1999 Parliament in Cape Town, South Africa. The Parliament began with a showing of the international AIDS Memorial Quilt to highlight the epidemic of AIDS in South Africa, and of the role that religious and spiritual traditions play in facing the critical issues that face the world. The event continued with hundreds of panels, symposia and workshops, offerings of prayer and meditation, plenaries and performances. The programs emphasized issues of religious, spiritual, and cultural identity, approaches to interreligious dialogue, and the role of religion in response to the critical issues facing the world today. At this session, Michael Beckwith and Mary Morrissey became the first New Thought ministers appointed to the Parliament of World Religions.

The Parliament Assembly considered a document called A Call to Our Guiding Institutions, addressed to religion, government, business, education, and media inviting these institutions to reflect on and transform their roles at the threshold of the next century.

In addition to the Call, the Parliament staff had created a book, Gifts of Service to the World, showcasing over 300 projects considered to be making a difference in the world. The Assembly members also deliberated about Gifts of Service which they could offer or could pledge to support among those projects gathered in the Gifts document.

=== 2004 Parliament ===
External videos
- Opening ceremony 2004

It was celebrated in the Universal Forum of Cultures. More than 8,900 individuals attended the 2004 Parliament in Barcelona, Spain. Having created the declaration Towards a Global Ethic at the 1993 Parliament and attempted to engage guiding institutions at the 1999 Parliament, the 2004 Parliament concentrated on four pressing issues: mitigating religiously motivated violence, access to safe water, the fate of refugees worldwide, and the elimination of external debt in developing countries. Those attending were asked to make a commitment to a "simple and profound act" to work on one of these issues.

=== 2009 Parliament ===
Melbourne, Australia, hosted the 2009 Parliament of the World's Religions. The 2009 parliament took place from 3 to 9 December. Over 6,000 people attended the parliament.

The Melbourne parliament addressed issues of Aboriginal reconciliation. The issues of sustainability and global climate change were explored through the lens of indigenous spiritualities. Environmental issues and the spirituality of youth were also key areas of dialogue.

The Council for a Parliament of the World's Religions suggested that the Melbourne parliament would "educate participants for global peace and justice" through exploring religious conflict and globalization, creating community and cross-cultural networks and addressing issues of religious violence. It supported "strengthening religious and spiritual communities" by providing a special focus on indigenous and Aboriginal spiritualities; facilitating cooperation between Pagan, Jewish, Christian, Baháʼí, Jain, Muslim, Buddhist, Sikh and Hindu communities. In addition, the council focused on crafting new responses to religious extremism and confronting homegrown terrorism and violence.

Dirk Ficca served as the executive director at the time of the 2009 Parliament of Religions. Zabrina Santiago served as deputy director and partner cities director.

=== 2015 Parliament ===
In 2011, the Parliament of the World's Religions announced that the 2014 Parliament would take place in Brussels, Belgium. In November 2012, a joint statement from Brussels and CPWR announced that because of the financial crisis in Europe, Brussels was unable to raise the funds required for a Parliament.

On 15–19 October, the 2015 Parliament took place at the Salt Palace in Salt Lake City, Utah. 9,806 attendees, performers, and volunteers from 73 countries, 30 major religions and 548 sub-traditions participated in the Parliament. During the closing ceremony, Abdul Malik Mujahid announced that the Parliament would henceforth be held every two years, with the next gathering scheduled for 2017, later rescheduled for 2018.

=== 2018 Parliament ===
The board of trustees of the Parliament selected Toronto as the site of the 2018 Parliament of the World's Religions at their April 2017 meeting. The event took place from 1 to 7 November 2018. More than 8,000 people attended the sessions, including the Dalai Lama, who addressed the opening plenary of the Parliament.

=== 2021 Parliament ===
The Parliament of the World's Religions was held online from 16 October through 18 October 2021, because of the COVID-19 pandemic.

=== 2023 Parliament ===
In October of 2021, the chair of the board of the Parliament of the World's Religions announced that its 9th global convening would take place in 2023 in Chicago, USA.

The 2023 Parliament of the World's Religions was hosted from 14 August through 18 August at the McCormick Place Lakeside Center.

== Related events ==
=== Great Religious Exposition ===
From March to May 1930, Kyoto, Japan hosted a Great Religious Exposition (宗教大博覧会, Shūkyō Dai-hakurankai). Religious groups from across Japan and China exhibited at the fair. All of Japan's traditional Buddhist sects had an exhibit, as well as Christianity.

=== 2007 Monterrey Forum of Cultures ===
Forum Monterrey 2007 was an international event which included Parliament-style events and dialogues. It was held as part of the 2007 Universal Forum of Cultures, which featured international congresses, dialogues, exhibitions, and spectacles on the themes of peace, diversity, sustainability and knowledge. Special emphasis was placed on the eight objectives of the Millennium Development goals for eradicating abject poverty around the world.

=== 2016 Central European Interfaith Forum (CEIF 2016) ===
External videos
- Video of Fahad Abualnasr, director general of KAICIID Dialog Center, who addressed the Central European Interfaith Forum 2016 held in Nitra, Slovakia.

On 25 July 2016 the Parliament of the World's Religions–Slovakia and the Slovak Esperanto Federation in collaboration with other partners organized in Nitra, Slovakia called the Central European Interfaith Forum.

Besides Elisabeth Ziegler-Duregger, ambassador of the Parliament of the World's Religions, there were also more than 150 participants representing 20 nations, three continents, seven world religions as well as other religious, spiritual or humanist traditions convened for interfaith and civic exchanges in the search for solutions to the growing ethnic, cultural and religious tension in Europe and to jointly address some of humanity's most vexing problems such as the alarming trends of nationalism, extremism and xenophobia in societies. The event resulted in a statement (the Nitra statement).

== See also ==
- Ecumenism
- Interfaith dialogue
- Sarva Dharma Sammelan (Meeting of all religions), held every year in India
- Congress of Leaders of World and Traditional Religions
- Document on Human Fraternity
- International Day of Human Fraternity
- New religious movement
