= 1982 in film =

The following is an overview of events in 1982 in film, including the highest-grossing films, award ceremonies and festivals, a list of films released and notable deaths.

== Highest-grossing films ==
=== North America ===
The top ten 1982 released films by box office gross in North America are as follows:

Highest-grossing films of 1982
Rank	Title	Distributor	Box-office gross
1	E.T. the Extra-Terrestrial	Universal	$359,197,037 (Note: Amblin corrected Variety's reporting of E.T.'s gross in 1992, stating that it had grossed $367.6 million in its initial release.)
2	Tootsie	Columbia	$177,200,000
3	An Officer and a Gentleman	Paramount	$129,795,554
4	Rocky III	United Artists/MGM	$124,146,897
5	Porky's	20th Century Fox	$105,492,483
6	Star Trek II: The Wrath of Khan	Paramount	$78,912,963
7	48 Hrs.	Paramount	$78,868,508
8	Poltergeist	MGM	$76,606,280
9	The Best Little Whorehouse in Texas	Universal	$69,701,637
10	Annie	Columbia	$57,059,003

=== Outside North America ===
The highest-grossing 1982 films in countries outside of North America.

International market	Title	Director	Production country	Gross	Ref
China	Shaolin Temple	Chang Hsin Yen	China / Hong Kong	CN¥161,578,014	
France	E.T. the Extra-Terrestrial	Steven Spielberg	United States	7,881,332 admissions	
West Germany	E.T. the Extra-Terrestrial	Steven Spielberg	United States	7,666,017 admissions	
India	Vidhaata	Subhash Ghai	India	₹160,000,000 ($16,300,000)	(Note: ₹9.79 per US$ in 1982)
Italy	E.T. the Extra-Terrestrial	Steven Spielberg	United States	10,298,000 admissions	
Japan	The Gods Must Be Crazy	Jamie Uys	South Africa	¥2,360,000,000 (rentals)	
South Korea	Dragon Lord	Jackie Chan	Hong Kong	₩894,366,000	
Soviet Union	Sportloto-82	Leonid Gaidai	Soviet Union	13,800,000 Rbls ($19,500,000)	(Note: 55.2 million Soviet tickets sold, at average ticket price of 25 kopecks, approximately 13.8 million руб; 0.708 Rbl per US$ in 1982)
Spain	E.T. the Extra-Terrestrial	Steven Spielberg	United States	7,719,932 admissions	
Taiwan	The Gods Must Be Crazy	Jamie Uys	South Africa	NT$39,431,235	
United Kingdom	E.T. the Extra-Terrestrial	Steven Spielberg	United States	£21,700,000	

== Worldwide gross revenue ==
The following table lists known worldwide gross revenue figures for several high-grossing films that originally released in 1982. Note that this list is incomplete and is therefore not representative of the highest-grossing films worldwide in 1982.

Title	Worldwide gross (US$)	Source(s)	Production country
E.T. the Extra-Terrestrial	$792,910,554		United States
Gandhi	$127,767,889		India; United Kingdom
Rocky III	$124,146,897		United States
Poltergeist	$121,706,019		United States
Shaolin Temple	$111,441,439	(Note: Shaolin Temple: China – CN¥161,578,014 (US$85,355,528); Hong Kong – HK$16,157,801 (US$2,661,911); Singapore – S$1.7 million (US$794,000); Japan – ¥4 billion (US$16.06 million); South Korea – ₩5.1 billion (US$6.57 million))	China; Hong Kong
Disco Dancer	$106,000,000		India
Star Trek II: The Wrath of Khan	$97,000,000		United States

== Events ==
- January 1 - Terry Semel becomes president of Warner Bros.
- March 5 - John Belushi dies after being injected with a mixture of heroin and cocaine at the Chateau Marmont hotel in Los Angeles, California.
- June 11
  - E.T. the Extra-Terrestrial is released; it became the highest-grossing film to date.
  - Michelle Pfeiffer appears in her first leading role, in Grease 2, the sequel to the top-grossing film of 1978.
- June 22 – The Coca-Cola Company acquires Columbia Pictures for $750 million.
- July 9 — Sci-fi movie Tron is the first feature film to use computer animation extensively.
- July 23 — During production of Twilight Zone: The Movie, Vic Morrow and two child actors are accidentally killed during a helicopter scene, leading to reforms in filmmaking safety and child-labor laws.
- October 22 – First Blood is released to widespread commercial and critical success, launching the Rambo franchise.
- December 8 – Comedian Eddie Murphy makes his film debut in the hit 48 Hrs.
- December 17 – Tootsie is released, becoming the highest-grossing comedy to date and Columbia Pictures's highest-grossing film at $177 million.
- December 27 - Ned Tanen resigns as president of Universal Pictures. Robert Rehme becomes president of Universal's new Theatrical Motion Picture Group.
- The THX Sound System is developed for movie theaters.

== Awards ==
Category/Organization	40th Golden Globe Awards January 29, 1983		36th BAFTA Awards March 20, 1983	55th Academy Awards April 11, 1983
Category/Organization	Drama	Musical or Comedy	36th BAFTA Awards March 20, 1983	55th Academy Awards April 11, 1983
Best Film	E.T. the Extra-Terrestrial	Tootsie	Gandhi	
Best Director	Richard Attenborough; Gandhi			
Best Actor	Ben Kingsley; Gandhi	Dustin Hoffman; Tootsie	Ben Kingsley; Gandhi	
Best Actress	Meryl Streep; Sophie's Choice	Julie Andrews; Victor/Victoria	Katharine Hepburn; On Golden Pond	Meryl Streep; Sophie's Choice
Best Supporting Actor	Louis Gossett Jr. An Officer and a Gentleman		Jack Nicholson; Reds	Louis Gossett Jr. An Officer and a Gentleman
Best Supporting Actress	Jessica Lange; Tootsie		Rohini Hattangadi; Gandhi; Maureen Stapleton; Reds	Jessica Lange; Tootsie
Best Screenplay, Adapted	John Briley; Gandhi		Costa-Gavras and Donald E. Stewart; Missing	Costa-Gavras and Donald E. Stewart; Missing
Best Screenplay, Original	John Briley; Gandhi		Costa-Gavras and Donald E. Stewart; Missing	John Briley; Gandhi
Best Original Score	John Williams; E.T. the Extra-Terrestrial			John Williams; E.T. the Extra-Terrestrial; Henry Mancini and Leslie Bricusse; Victor/Victoria
Best Original Song	"Up Where We Belong"; An Officer and a Gentleman		"Another Brick in the Wall"; Pink Floyd – The Wall	"Up Where We Belong"; An Officer and a Gentleman
Best Foreign Language Film	Gandhi		Christ Stopped at Eboli	Begin the Beguine

Palme d'Or (Cannes Film Festival):

Missing, directed by Costa-Gavras, United States
Yol (The Way), directed by Yılmaz Güney, Turkey

Golden Lion (Venice Film Festival):

The State of Things (Der Stand der Dinge), directed by Wim Wenders, W. Germany / Portugal / US

Golden Bear (Berlin Film Festival):

Die Sehnsucht der Veronika Voss (Veronika Voss), directed by Rainer Werner Fassbinder, W. Germany

People's Choice Award (Toronto International Film Festival):

Tempest, directed by Paul Mazursky, United States

== 1982 films ==
=== By country/region ===
- List of American films of 1982
- List of Argentine films of 1982
- List of Australian films of 1982
- List of Bangladeshi films of 1982
- List of British films of 1982
- List of Canadian films of 1982
- List of French films of 1982
- List of Hong Kong films of 1982
- List of Indian films of 1982
  - List of Hindi films of 1982
  - List of Kannada films of 1982
  - List of Malayalam films of 1982
  - List of Marathi films of 1982
  - List of Tamil films of 1982
  - List of Telugu films of 1982
- List of Japanese films of 1982
- List of Mexican films of 1982
- List of Pakistani films of 1982
- List of South Korean films of 1982
- List of Soviet films of 1982
- List of Spanish films of 1982

=== By genre/medium ===
- List of action films of 1982
- List of animated feature films of 1982
- List of avant-garde films of 1982
- List of comedy films of 1982
- List of drama films of 1982
- List of horror films of 1982
- List of science fiction films of 1982
- List of thriller films of 1982
- List of western films of 1982

== Births ==
- January 4 - Kang Hye-jung, South Korean actress
- January 6
  - Misha Omar, Malaysian actress and singer
  - Eddie Redmayne, English actor
- January 7 – Lauren Cohan, British-American actress
- January 8 – Gaby Hoffmann, American actress
- January 9 - Catherine, Princess of Wales, Brittish monarch, wife of Prince William
- January 10
  - Josh Ryan Evans, American actor (d. 2002)
  - Misato Fukuen, Japanese voice actress
- January 11
  - Blake Heron, American actor (d. 2017)
  - Son Ye-jin, South Korean actress
- January 13
  - Pawel Szajda, American actor
  - Ruth Wilson, English actress
- January 16 – Birgitte Hjort Sørensen, Danish actress
- January 18 - Joanna Newsom, American singer-songwriter and actress
- January 19
  - Tom Lorcan, English actor
  - Simone Missick, American actress
  - Jodie Sweetin, American actress
- January 23 - Geoffrey Wigdor, American actor
- January 24
  - Daveed Diggs, American actor, rapper, singer, songwriter, screenwriter, and producer
  - Fiona Xie, Singaporean actress and television host
- January 25
  - John Behlmann, American actor
  - Shawna Waldron, American actress
- January 28 – Mirtel Pohla, Estonian actress
- February 1 - Daisy Betts, Australian actress
- February 3 – Bridget Regan, American actress
- February 5 – Yū Kobayashi, Japanese voice actress
- February 6 – Alice Eve, English actress
- February 7 – Cory Doran, Canadian voice actor and director
- February 8 – Danny Tamberelli, American actor
- February 10 – Yoshimasa Hosoya, Japanese voice actor
- February 11 – Natalie Dormer, English actress
- February 12 – Carter Hayden, Canadian actor and voice actor
- February 15 – Nesreen Tafesh, Syrian-Palestinian-Algerian actress and singer
- February 22
  - Kim Allen, American actress
  - Buğra Gülsoy, Turkish actor and director
  - Dichen Lachman, Australian actress and producer
- February 23 – Adam Hann-Byrd, American actor and screenwriter
- February 24 – Fala Chen, Hong Kong actress
- March 1 – Kim Min-hee, South Korean actress
- March 2 – Pilou Asbæk, Danish actor
- March 3 – Jessica Biel, American actress
- March 7 – Nora Danish, Malaysian actress
- March 8 – Marjorie Estiano, Brazilian actress
- March 10
  - Shin Koyamada, Japanese actor, producer and martial artist
  - Thomas Middleditch, Canadian actor, voice actor, comedian and screenwriter
- March 11
  - Thora Birch, American actress
  - Robbie Daymond, American voice actor
  - Mircea Monroe, American actress and model
- March 12
  - Lili Bordán, Hungarian-American actress
  - Samm Levine, American comedian and actor
  - Luis Gerardo Méndez, Mexican actor and producer
- March 14 – Kate Maberly, English actress, director, writer, producer and musician
- March 15
  - Tom Budge, Australian actor
  - Patricia Summersett, Canadian actress
- March 16 – Dian Sastrowardoyo, Indonesian actress
- March 18 – Adam Pally, American actor, comedian, writer and producer
- March 20
  - Nick Blood, English actor
  - Erica Luttrell, Canadian actress
- March 21 - Santino Fontana, American actor and singer
- March 22 – Constance Wu, American actress
- March 23 - Nicolas Wright, Canadian actor and writer
- March 24 – Kenichirou Ohashi, Japanese voice actor
- March 25
  - Sean Faris, American actor and model
  - Rory Markham, American mixed martial artist and actor
  - Jenny Slate, American comedian
- March 26 - Joe Anderson, English actor and singer
- March 28 - Flula Borg, German actor, musician, comedian, YouTube personality and DJ
- March 31
  - Falk Hentschel, German actor and choreographer
  - Judi Shekoni, English actress
  - Brian Tyree Henry, African-American actor
  - Chloé Zhao, Chinese-American director
- April 1
  - Sam Huntington, American actor
  - Taran Killam, American actor and comedian
- April 3
  - Sofia Boutella, Algerian actress
  - Cobie Smulders, Canadian actress
- April 4
  - Justin Cook, American voice actor
  - Kett Turton, American-born Canadian actor
- April 5 – Hayley Atwell, English-American actress
- April 6 – Miguel Ángel Silvestre, Spanish actor
- April 9 – Jay Baruchel, Canadian actor-comedian
- April 10 – Chyler Leigh, American actress
- April 11 – Remy Ishak, Malaysian actor
- April 13 - Giulia Steigerwalt, Italian screenwriter, director and former actress
- April 14 – Paolla Oliveira, Brazilian actress
- April 15 - Seth Rogen, Canadian actor, comedian and filmmaker
- April 16 - Gina Carano, American actress
- April 19
  - Marta Milans, Spanish-American actress
  - Cassandra Lee Morris, American voice actress
  - Ignacio Serricchio, Argentine-born American actor
  - Ali Wong, Vietnamese-Chinese-American stand-up comedian, actress and writer
  - Blitz the Ambassador, Ghanaian filmmaker, author, visual artist, rapper
- April 22
  - Cassidy Freeman, American actress and musician
  - Noriko Shitaya, Japanese voice actress
- April 24 – Kelly Clarkson, American singer, songwriter and actress
- April 25 – Josh Kelly, American actor
- April 28 – Harry Shum Jr., Costa Rican-American actor, singer and dancer
- April 30
  - Kirsten Dunst, American actress
  - Joseph Perrino, American actor
  - Drew Seeley, Canadian actor and singer
- May 1 – Jamie Dornan, Northern Irish actor
- May 3 – Rebecca Hall, English-American actress
- May 8 – Christina Cole, English actress
- May 11
  - Evan Goldberg, Canadian filmmaker
  - Jonathan Jackson, American actor
  - Cory Monteith, Canadian actor and musician (d. 2013)
- May 14
  - Anjelah Johnson, American actress and comedian
  - Jessica Raine, English actress
- May 15 - Alexandra Breckenridge, American actress
- May 16 - Tiya Sircar, American actress
- May 20 – Donald Reignoux, French voice actor
- May 24 – Chaunté Wayans, American actress, comedian, writer and editor
- May 25 – Fryda Wolff, American voice actress
- May 28 – Alexa Davalos, American actress
- May 29 – Anita Briem, Icelandic actress
- May 31
  - Lee Majdoub, Canadian actor
  - Jonathan Tucker, American actor
- June 2 – Jewel Staite, Canadian actress
- June 4 – MC Jin, American rapper, actor and comedian of Chinese descent
- June 5 – Yoo In-na, South Korean actress
- June 7 - Amy Nuttall, English actress and singer
- June 8 – Josh Pence, American actor
- June 16
  - Missy Peregrym, Canadian actress
  - Jodi Sta. Maria, Filipina actress
- June 17
  - Arthur Darvill, English actor and musician
  - Ursula Ratasepp, Estonian actress
  - Jodie Whittaker, English actress
- June 19 – Gabriella Wright, English actress
- June 21
  - Benjamin Walker, American actor
  - Jussie Smollett, American actor
  - William, Prince of Wales, Brittish Monarch
- June 22 – Mati Diop, French-Senegalese actress and director
- June 24
  - Laura Donnelly, Northern Irish actress
  - Sarai Givaty, Israeli actress and singer-songwriter
  - Lotte Verbeek, Dutch actress
- June 25 - Rain, South Korean singer-songwriter and actor
- June 27
  - Polo Ravales, Filipino actor and model
  - Takeru Shibaki, Japanese actor
- June 28 – Grazi Massafera, Brazilian actress
- June 29
  - Colin Jost, American actor and comedian
  - Matthew Mercer, American voice actor
  - Lily Rabe, American actress
  - Ott Sepp, Estonian actor
- June 30 – Lizzy Caplan, American actress
- July 1
  - Hilarie Burton, American actress
  - Fedi Nuril, Indonesian actor
- July 6 - Misty Upham, Native American actress (d. 2014)
- July 8
  - Sophia Bush, American actress
  - Schuyler Fisk, American singer-songwriter and actress
- July 9 – Toby Kebbell, English actor
- July 13 - Aya Cash, American actress
- July 18 – Priyanka Chopra, Indian actress
- July 19
  - Jared Padalecki, American actor
  - Derek Wilson, American actor
- July 23
  - Zanjoe Marudo, Filipino actor
  - Tom Mison, English actor
  - Paul Wesley, American actor
- July 24
  - Elisabeth Moss, American actress
  - Anna Paquin, New Zealand actress
- July 25 – Brad Renfro, American actor (d. 2008)
- July 28 - Tom Pelphrey, American actor
- July 29 - Allison Mack, American actress
- July 30
  - Nesrin Cavadzade, Turkish-Azerbaijani actress
  - Brandon Scott, American actor and producer
  - Martin Starr, American actor
  - Yvonne Strahovski, Australian actress
- August 1 – Ai Tominaga, Japanese model and actress
- August 6 – Romola Garai, English actress
- August 7 – Abbie Cornish, Australian actress
- August 9 - Daniel Henshall, Australian actor
- August 10 – Devon Aoki, American actress and model
- August 11 - Remi Adeleke, American writer and actor
- August 13 – Sebastian Stan, Romanian-American actor
- August 16
  - Cam Gigandet, American actor
  - Todd Haberkorn, American voice actor
- August 19
  - Erika Christensen, American actress
  - Melissa Fumero, American actress
- August 20
  - Meghan Ory, Canadian actress
  - Jamil Walker Smith, American actor
- August 21 – Akane Omae, Japanese voice actress
- August 25 – Benjamin Diskin, American voice actor
- August 26
  - Nazneen Contractor, Canadian actress
  - John Mulaney, American stand-up comedian, actor, writer and producer
- August 28 – LeAnn Rimes, American singer-songwriter and actress
- August 29 – Echo Kellum, African-American comedian and actor
- September 1 – Zoe Lister-Jones, American actress and filmmaker
- September 3 – Ayumi Fujimura, Japanese voice actress
- September 4
  - Shaheizy Sam, Malaysian actor
  - Sarah Solemani, English actress and writer
- September 7
  - David Dawson, English actor
  - Ryoko Shiraishi, Japanese voice actress
- September 10 – Bret Iwan, American voice actor
- September 13
  - J. G. Quintel, American animator, television writer and voice actor
- September 15 – Evan Goldberg, Canadian filmmaker and comedian
- September 19 – Columbus Short, American actor and dancer
- September 20
  - JJ Jia, Hong Kong actress
  - Hu Ge, Chinese actor
- September 22
  - Katie Lowes, American actress
  - Billie Piper, English singer and actress
- September 23 - Alyssa Sutherland, Australian actress
- September 25 – Charlene Amoia, American actress
- September 27 – Anna Camp, American actress and singer
- September 28 – Ranbir Kapoor, Indian actor
- September 29 – Stephen "tWitch" Boss, American dancer, choreographer, and actor (d. 2022)
- September 30
  - Lacey Chabert, American actress
  - Kieran Culkin, American actor
- October 1 – Olga Fonda, Russian-American actress
- October 2 - Amanda Hale, English actress
- October 3 – Erik von Detten, former American actor
- October 5 - Francisco Bosch, Spanish actor
- October 7 - Jake McLaughlin, American actor
- October 10 – Dan Stevens, British actor
- October 11
  - Trevor Donovan, American actor
  - Kristy Wu, American retired actress
- October 12 - Sarah Smyth, Canadian actress
- October 13 – Jo Yoon-hee, South Korean actress and model
- October 15
  - Imran Abbas, Pakistani actor and model
  - Jessica Rey, American actress
  - Lane Toran, American actor, voice actor, musician and songwriter
- October 19 - Gillian Jacobs, American actress
- October 23 – Bradley Pierce, American actor
- October 27
  - Patrick Fugit, American actor
  - Takashi Tsukamoto, Japanese actor and singer
- October 28
  - Matt Smith, English actor
  - Michael Stahl-David, American actor
- October 29 – Chelan Simmons, Canadian actress and former professional model
- October 30 – Clémence Poésy, French actress and model
- October 31 – Justin Chatwin, Canadian actor
- November 2 – Kyoko Fukada, Japanese actress and singer
- November 4 – Travis Van Winkle, American actor
- November 11 – Fayssal Bazzi, Australian actor
- November 12 – Anne Hathaway, American actress
- November 14 - Laura Ramsey, American actress
- November 15 – Yaya DaCosta, American actress
- November 18
  - Akeno Watanabe, Japanese voice actress
  - Damon Wayans Jr., American actor, comedian and writer
- November 21 – Ryan Carnes, American actor
- November 22 – Fiona Glascott, Irish actress
- November 24 – Joey Ansah, British actor, director and martial artist
- November 25 – Natalia Cordova-Buckley, Mexican-American actress
- November 26 - Sam Hargrave, American stunt coordinator, stuntman, actor and director
- November 28
  - Malcolm Goodwin, American actor
  - Alan Ritchson, American actor, filmmaker and singer
- November 29
  - Gemma Chan, English actress
  - Lucas Black, American actor
  - Eddie Spears, Indigenous American actor
- November 30 – Elisha Cuthbert, Canadian actress
- December 1
  - Riz Ahmed, British actor and rapper
  - Jonny Cruz, American actor, scriptwriter, producer, filmmaker and musician
- December 3
  - Jaycee Chan, American-born Hong Kong actor and singer
  - Dascha Polanco, Dominican-American actress
  - Adam Wingard, American filmmaker
- December 5 – Gabriel Luna, American actor and producer
- December 7
  - Jack Huston, British actor
  - Jesse Johnson, American actor
- December 8
  - Nicki Minaj, American rapper
  - Hannah Ware, English actress
- December 12 – Ai Kato, Japanese actress
- December 14 - Jesse Garcia, American actor
- December 15
  - Charlie Cox, English actor
  - George O. Gore II, American actor
- December 16 – Justin Mentell, American actor (d. 2010)
- December 21 – Alexia Barlier, French actress
- December 22 – Alinne Moraes, Brazilian actress
- December 24
  - Robert Schwartzman, American actor, screenwriter, director, and musician
  - Tetsuya Kakihara, Japanese voice actor
- December 26 - Shun Oguri, Japanese actor
- December 28 – Beau Garrett, American actress and model
- December 29 – Alison Brie, American actress
- December 30 – Kristin Kreuk, Canadian actress

== Deaths ==
Month	Date	Name	Age	Country	Profession	Notable films
January	1	Victor Buono	43	US	Actor	What Ever Happened to Baby Jane?; Robin and the 7 Hoods
January	1	Margot Grahame	70	UK	Actress	The Informer; The Three Musketeers
January	4	Kathryn Scola	90	US	Screenwriter	Baby Face; The Glass Key
January	5	Hans Conried	64	US	Actor	The 5,000 Fingers of Dr. T.; Peter Pan
January	5	Harvey Lembeck	58	US	Actor	Stalag 17; Beach Party
January	8	Reta Shaw	69	US	Actress	Mary Poppins; Escape to Witch Mountain
January	8	Grégoire Aslan	73	Switzerland	Actor	Cleopatra; The Return of the Pink Panther
January	10	Paul Lynde	55	US	Actor	Bye Bye Birdie; Send Me No Flowers
January	30	Stanley Holloway	91	UK	Actor	My Fair Lady; Brief Encounter
February	5	Dolores Moran	58	US	Actress	To Have and Have Not; The Horn Blows at Midnight
February	11	Eleanor Powell	69	US	Actress, Dancer	Born to Dance; Broadway Melody of 1936
February	11	Takashi Shimura	76	Japan	Actor	Seven Samurai; Godzilla
February	12	Victor Jory	79	Canada	Actor	Gone with the Wind; The Adventures of Tom Sawyer
February	14	Antonio Casas	70	Spain	Actor	The Good, the Bad and the Ugly; Tristana
February	17	Lee Strasberg	80	US	Actor	The Godfather Part II; Going in Style
February	18	Tina Carver	59	US	Actress	From Hell It Came; Inside Detroit
February	22	John Carter	74	US	Sound Engineer	Jaws; El Dorado
February	24	Virginia Bruce	71	US	Actress	The Great Ziegfeld; Jane Eyre
March	5	John Belushi	33	US	Actor	The Blues Brothers; National Lampoon's Animal House
March	5	Burton Miller	57	US	Costume Designer	The Front Page; Airport '77
March	5	Giuseppe Porelli	84	Italy	Actor	I dieci comandamenti; Don Camillo: Monsignor
March	6	Ayn Rand	77	Russia	Screenwriter	The Fountainhead; Love Letters
March	8	Walter Plunkett	79	US	Costume Designer	Gone with the Wind; An American in Paris
March	19	Alan Badel	58	UK	Actor	The Day of the Jackal; Force 10 from Navarone
March	21	Harry H. Corbett	57	UK	Actor	Jabberwocky; Carry On Screaming!
March	22	Harold Goldblatt	82	UK	Actor	A Night to Remember; Sunday Bloody Sunday
March	26	Sam Kydd	67	UK	Actor	The Ladykillers; Eye of the Needle
March	27	Betty Schade	87	US	Actress	After Five; First Love
March	29	Rudy Bond	69	US	Actor	The Godfather; A Streetcar Named Desire
April	1	Stephen Chase	79	US	Actor	When Worlds Collide; The Blob
April	3	Warren Oates	53	US	Actor	The Wild Bunch; In the Heat of the Night
April	7	Brenda Benet	36	US	Actress	Harum Scarum; Walking Tall
April	12	Lenny Baker	37	US	Actor	Next Stop, Greenwich Village; The Paper Chase
April	15	Arthur Lowe	66	UK	Actor	Kind Hearts and Coronets; The Ruling Class
April	21	Joe Sawyer	75	Canada	Actor	Gilda; It Came from Outer Space
April	22	Stanley Roberts	65	US	Screenwriter	The Caine Mutiny; Made in Paris
April	25	W. R. Burnett	82	US	Screenwriter	High Sierra; The Great Escape
April	25	Don Wilson	81	US	Actor	Niagara; Buck Benny Rides Again
April	26	Celia Johnson	73	UK	Actress	Brief Encounter; The Prime of Miss Jean Brodie
April	27	George Dunn	67	US	Actor	Operation Petticoat; The Beguiled
April	27	Tom Tully	73	US	Actor	The Caine Mutiny; Charley Varrick
May	1	Margaret Sheridan	55	US	Actress	The Thing from Another World; I, the Jury
May	2	Helmut Dantine	63	Austria	Actor	Whispering City; Bring Me the Head of Alfredo Garcia
May	2	Hugh Marlowe	71	US	Actor	All About Eve; The Day the Earth Stood Still
May	2	Wini Shaw	75	US	Actress, Singer	Gold Diggers of 1935; Front Page Woman
May	14	Hugh Beaumont	73	US	Actor	The Blue Dahlia; Railroaded!
May	16	Sidney Hickox	86	US	Cinematographer	The Big Sleep; White Heat
May	16	Leigh Snowden	52	US	Actress	Outside the Law; The Creature Walks Among Us
May	29	Romy Schneider	43	Germany	Actress	The Trial; What's New Pussycat?
June	10	Rainer Werner Fassbinder	37	Germany	Screenwriter, Director, Actor	Love Is Colder Than Death; Katzelmacher
June	16	Gwen Wakeling	81	US	Costume Designer	Samson and Delilah; How Green Was My Valley
June	18	Curd Jürgens	66	Germany	Actor, Director	The Spy Who Loved Me; The Longest Day
June	21	Cotton Warburton	70	US	Film Editor	Mary Poppins; Neptune's Daughter
June	29	Michael Brennan	69	UK	Actor	Trouble in Store; Up in the World
June	29	Henry King	96	US	Director, Producer	Twelve O'Clock High; The Gunfighter
July	8	Isa Miranda	73	Italy	Actress	Hotel Imperial; Summertime
July	12	Kenneth More	67	UK	Actor	The Longest Day; Battle of Britain
July	16	Patrick Dewaere	35	France	Actor, Screenwriter, Director	A Bad Son; Le Juge Fayard dit Le Shériff
July	18	John Maxwell	64	US	Actor	The Prowler; Without Warning!
July	19	John Harvey	70	UK	Actor	The Satanic Rites of Dracula; The Man with My Face
July	23	Vic Morrow	53	US	Actor	Twilight Zone: The Movie; The Bad News Bears
July	29	Harold Sakata	62	US	Actor	Goldfinger; Dimension 5
August	2	Cathleen Nesbitt	93	UK	Actress	An Affair to Remember; Separate Tables
August	7	Jill Banner	35	US	Actress	Spider Baby; The President's Analyst
August	10	William Henry	67	US	Actor	The Thin Man; Mister Roberts
August	10	José Nieto	80	Spain	Actor	The Girl from Bejar; El abanderado
August	11	Folmar Blangsted	77	Denmark	Film Editor	Rio Bravo; Summer of '42
August	11	Tom Drake	64	US	Actor	Meet Me in St. Louis; Words and Music
August	12	Henry Fonda	77	US	Actor	12 Angry Men; Once Upon a Time in the West
August	13	Joe E. Ross	68	US	Actor	Hear Me Good; The Love Bug
August	13	Charles Walters	70	US	Director	Lili; The Unsinkable Molly Brown
August	14	Kanhaiyalal	71-72	India	Actor	Meri Surat Teri Ankhen; Satyam Shivam Sundaram
August	14	Patrick Magee	58	Ireland	Actor	A Clockwork Orange; Barry Lyndon
August	19	Russell Waters	74	UK	Actor	The Wicker Man; The Blue Lagoon
August	20	Ulla Jacobsson	53	Sweden	Actress	Smiles of a Summer Night; Love Is a Ball
August	20	Edward Ludwig	82	Russia	Director	Wake of the Red Witch; Big Jim McLain
August	22	John Boxer	73	UK	Actor	Gandhi; The Bridge on the River Kwai
August	29	Ingrid Bergman	67	Sweden	Actress	Casablanca; Notorious
September	2	Jay Novello	78	US	Actor	The Pride and the Passion; The Lost World
September	5	Richard Lane	83	US	Actor	Alias Boston Blackie; Brother Orchid
September	13	Philip Ober	80	US	Actor	From Here to Eternity; North by Northwest
September	14	Grace Kelly	52	US	Actress	Rear Window; Dial M for Murder
September	15	Rolfe Sedan	86	US	Actor	Ninotchka; Phantom of the Rue Morgue
September	24	Sarah Churchill	67	UK	Actress	Royal Wedding; All Over the Town
September	28	Mabel Albertson	81	US	Actress	What's Up, Doc?; Barefoot in the Park
September	28	Seth Banks	66	US	Costume Designer	To Kill a Mockingbird; 9 to 5
October	3	Vivien Merchant	53	UK	Actress	Frenzy; Alfie
October	5	Joseph Hurley	68	US	Art Director	Psycho; The Postman Always Rings Twice
October	8	Fernando Lamas	67	Argentina	Actor, Director	Dangerous When Wet; The Merry Widow
October	12	John Brahm	89	Germany	Director	Hangover Square; The Locket
October	12	Howard Sackler	52	US	Screenwriter	The Great White Hope; Jaws 2
October	26	Valerio Zurlini	56	Italy	Director, Screenwriter	The Desert of the Tartars; Violent Summer
November	1	King Vidor	88	US	Director, Producer, Screenwriter	Duel in the Sun; War and Peace
November	1	James Broderick	55	US	Actor	Dog Day Afternoon; The Taking of Pelham One Two Three
November	4	Dominique Dunne	22	US	Actress	Poltergeist
November	4	Jacques Tati	75	France	Actor, Screenwriter, Director	Mon Oncle; Mr. Hulot's Holiday
November	7	Elio Petri	53	Italy	Director, Screenwriter	Investigation of a Citizen Above Suspicion; The 10th Victim
November	17	Ruth Donnelly	86	US	Actress	The Bells of St. Mary's; Mr. Smith Goes to Washington
November	18	William P. McGivern	63	US	Screenwriter	The Wrecking Crew; Brannigan
November	21	Lee Patrick	80	US	Actress	Auntie Mame; The Maltese Falcon
November	26	Robert Coote	73	UK	Actor	A Matter of Life and Death; The Ghost and Mrs. Muir
November	26	Dan Tobin	72	US	Actor	Woman of the Year; The Velvet Touch
November	27	Steve Gordon	44	US	Screenwriter, Director	Arthur; The One and Only
November	30	Verna Fields	64	US	Film Editor	Jaws; American Graffiti
December	2	Marty Feldman	48	UK	Actor, Director, Screenwriter	Young Frankenstein; The Last Remake of Beau Geste
December	10	Roy Webb	94	US	Composer	Notorious; Bringing Up Baby
December	21	Gladys Henson	83	Ireland	Actress	The Happiest Days of Your Life; The Prince and the Showgirl
December	22	Jack Webb	62	US	Actor	Sunset Boulevard; Pete Kelly's Blues
December	29	Sol C. Siegel	79	US	Producer	Three Coins in the Fountain; Gentlemen Prefer Blondes

== Film debuts ==
- Caroline Aaron – Come Back to the 5 & Dime, Jimmy Dean, Jimmy Dean
- Pamela Adlon – Grease 2
- Antonio Banderas – Labyrinth of Passion
- Christine Baranski – Soup for One
- Frances Barber – The Missionary
- Sandrine Bonnaire – Les Sous-doués en vacances
- Michael Bowen – Forbidden World
- Nicolas Cage – Fast Times at Ridgemont High
- Billy Campbell – How Sleep the Brave
- Peter Capaldi – Living Apart Together
- Glenn Close – The World According to Garp
- Maryam d'Abo – Xtro
- Tim Daly – Diner
- Geena Davis – Tootsie
- Rebecca De Mornay – One from the Heart
- Christine Ebersole – Tootsie
- Erika Eleniak – E.T. the Extra-Terrestrial
- David Faustino – Neil Simon's I Ought to Be in Pictures
- Miguel Ferrer – Truckin' Buddy McCoy
- Monique Gabrielle – Night Shift
- Whoopi Goldberg – Citizen
- Hugh Grant – Privileged
- Anthony Michael Hall – Six Pack
- Paul Herman – Dear Mr. Wonderful
- C. Thomas Howell – E.T. the Extra-Terrestrial
- Alex Hyde-White – The Toy
- Željko Ivanek – The Soldier
- Luz María Jerez – Sorceress
- Angelina Jolie – Lookin' to Get Out
- Claudia Karvan – Going Down
- Tchéky Karyo – The Return of Martin Guerre
- Kevin Kline – Sophie's Choice
- Andy Lau – Once Upon a Rainbow
- Joey Lawrence – Hit and Run
- Jet Li – Shaolin Temple
- Vincent Lindon – Guy de Maupassant
- Diego Luna – Antonieta
- Amy Madigan – Love Child
- Michael Madsen – Against All Hope
- Wendie Malick – A Little Sex
- Ian McElhinney – Angel
- Ian McNeice – Voice Over
- Michael Milhoan – The Beach Girls
- Esai Morales – Forty Deuce
- Bill Moseley – Endangered Species
- Eddie Murphy – 48 Hrs.
- Gary Oldman – Remembrance
- Ed O'Ross – Dear Mr. Wonderful
- Barry Otto – Norman Loves Rose
- Rick Overton – Young Doctors in Love
- Rob Paulsen – Tron
- Larry Pine – I, the Jury
- Paul Reiser – Diner
- Molly Ringwald – Tempest
- Scott Rudin (producer) – I'm Dancing as Fast as I Can
- James Russo – A Stranger Is Watching
- William Sadler – Hanky Panky
- Meredith Salenger – Annie
- Miguel Sandoval – Timerider: The Adventure of Lyle Swann
- Greta Scacchi – Second Sight
- Jackie Shroff – Swami Dada
- Shawnee Smith – Annie
- Bill Smitrovich – A Little Sex
- Beau Starr – Hanky Panky
- Eric Stoltz – Fast Times at Ridgemont High
- Fred Tatasciore – Dragon Lord
- Ulrich Tukur – Die Weiße Rose
- Tom Virtue – Tex
- Wil Wheaton – The Secret of NIMH
- Forest Whitaker – Tag: The Assassination Game
- James Wilby – Privileged
- Mark Williams – Privileged
- Victor Wong – Nightsongs
- Philip Zandén – Jönssonligan och Dynamit-Harry
- Hans Zimmer (film composer) – Moonlighting
- Chuck Zito – Dead Ringer
- Daphne Zuniga – The Dorm That Dripped Blood
