= The Strange Marchioness =

- Directed by: Eusebio Fernández Ardavín
- Written by: Luis Fernández Ardavín; Pascual Guillén (play) Antonio Quintero (play)
- Cinematography: Hans Scheib
- Music by: Manuel Naranjo; Modesto Romero Martínez
- Production company: Cifesa
- Distributed by: Cifesa
- Release date: 23 March 1940
- Running time: 103 minutes
- Country: Spain
- Language: Spanish

The Strange Marchioness (Spanish:La marquesona) is a 1940 Spanish musical film directed by Eusebio Fernández Ardavín and starring Mary del Río, Fernando Fresno, Miguel García Morcillo. It was based on the 1934 play La marquesona, by Pascual Guillén and Antonio Quintero. The film was made by Spain's leading studio Cifesa.

== Cast ==
- Mary del Río
- Fernando Fresno
- Miguel García Morcillo
- Pastora Imperio
- Francisco Muñoz
- Nicolás D. Perchicot
- Luchy Soto
- Jesús Tordesillas

== Bibliography ==
- Bentley, Bernard. A Companion to Spanish Cinema. Boydell & Brewer 2008.
