= Joseph Hurley =

Joseph or Joe Hurley may refer to:

== People ==
- Joseph Hurley (art director) (1914–1982), American art director
- Joseph L. Hurley (1898–1956), American Democratic politician
- Joseph Patrick Hurley (1894–1967), American prelate of the Roman Catholic Church
- Joe Hurley, singer, songwriter and actor

== Characters ==
- Joe Hurley, character in 5 Card Stud
- Joe Hurley, character in Flatliners
