= Maruchi Fresno =

Spanish actress

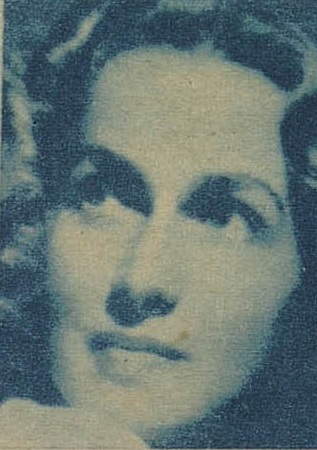
- Born: 14 February 1916; Madrid, Spain
- Died: 19 July 2003 (aged 87); Madrid, Spain
- Other name: María de Lourdes Gómez-Pamo del Fresno
- Occupation: Actress
- Years active: 1934-1999 (film)

Maruchi Fresno (14 February 1916 – 19 July 2003) was a Spanish film actress. Fresno appeared in around sixty films and television series during her long career. In 1947 she played the role of Isabel of Aragon in the historical film The Holy Queen.

== Partial filmography ==
- El agua en el suelo (1934) - Marucha Vilaredo
- Broken Lives (1935) - Irene
- Leyenda rota (1940) - Mari-Luz
- La última falla (1940) - Enriqueta
- El famoso Carballeira (1940)
- Tierra y cielo (1941) - Clara
- Una conquista difícil (1941)
- ¡¡Campeones!! (1943) - Himself (uncredited)
- Mi adorable secretaria (1943) - Marta
- Altar mayor (1944) - Teresa
- The Prodigal Woman (1946) - María
- Mar abierto (1946) - Carmiña
- The Holy Queen (1947) - Isabel of Aragón
- Serenata española (1947) - Laura Salcedo
- Noche sin cielo (1947) - Rosa
- The Captain from Loyola (1949) - Reina Juana
- Dora la espía (1950)
- The Vila Family (1950) - Carmen
- Historia de una escalera (1950) - Trini
- Criminal Brigade (1950) - Isabel - esposa del Inspector Basilio
- Verónica (1950)
- Reckless (1951) - Elena
- Catalina de Inglaterra (1951) - Catalina de Aragón
- La laguna negra (1952) - Candela
- Flight 971 (1953) - Carmen Valverde de Galván
- Pasaporte para un ángel (Órdenes secretas) (1954)
- La lupa (1955) - María
- The Night Heaven Fell (1958) - Conchita
- El redentor (1959) - Virgin Mary
- Solomon and Sheba (1959) - Bathsheba
- El camino (1963) - La Guindilla menor
- Diálogos de la paz (1965) - Mujer histérica
- The Great Leaders (1965) - Gideon's wife
- The Desperate Ones (1967)
- A Bullet for Rommel (1969) - Mrs. Rommel
- Algo amargo en la boca (1969) - Aurelia
- Casi jugando (1969)
- The Rebellious Novice (1971)
- The Regent's Wife (1974) - Marquesa
- La trastienda (1975) - Sagrario
- Laura, del cielo llega la noche (1987)
- Continuum (1994) - (voice)
- Pecata minuta (1998) - Sor Aurora (final film role)

== Bibliography ==
- Bentley, Bernard. A Companion to Spanish Cinema. Boydell & Brewer 2008.
