= The Holy Crown =

1947 film by Henrique Campos, Rafael Gil

Reina santa
- Spanish: Reina santa
- Directed by: Henrique Campos; Aníbal Contreiras; Rafael Gil
- Written by: Tavares Alves; Luna de Oliveira; Antonio Tudela; Rafael Gil; Aníbal Contreiras
- Produced by: Aníbal Contreiras; Cesáreo González
- Starring: Maruchi Fresno; António Vilar; Luis Peña; Fernando Rey
- Cinematography: Manuel Berenguer; Alfredo Fraile
- Edited by: Suevia Films
- Music by: Ruy Coelho
- Production company: Suevia Films
- Distributed by: Mercurio Films
- Release date: 15 September 1947
- Running time: 110 minutes
- Countries: Portugal; Spain
- Languages: Portuguese; Spanish

The Holy Crown (Spanish: Reina santa) is a 1947 Spanish-Portuguese historical drama film starring Maruchi Fresno, António Vilar and Luis Peña. Separate Spanish and Portuguese versions were filmed with the Spanish directed by Rafael Gil and the Portuguese by Henrique Campos and Aníbal Contreiras. It was part of a popular group of Spanish costume films made in the late 1940s.

The film portrays the life of Isabel of Aragon, a Spanish-born Queen of Portugal who played a role of peacemaker between different factions at the Portuguese court as well as between Portugal and Castile.

== Cast ==
- Maruchi Fresno as Isabel of Aragon
- António Vilar as Dinis, King of Portugal
- Luis Peña as Nuño de Lara
- Fernando Rey as baby Alfonso
- José Nieto as Vasco Peres, the alderman
- María Martín as Blanca
- Juan Espantaleón as Pedro, the priest
- Fernando Fernández de Córdoba as Peter III of Aragon
- María Asquerino as Leonor
- Barreto Poeira as Álvaro, the squire
- Milagros Leal as Doña Betaza
- Virgílio Teixeira as Alfonso Sánchez
- Julieta Castelo as Doña María Ximénez
- Gabriel Algara as Juan Velho
- Carmen Sánchez as Doña Constanza
- Emilio G. Ruiz as baby Pedro
- Manuel Guitián as Ramiro
- Joaquina Almarche as María de Molina
- Rafael Luis Calvo as Fernán Ayres
- José Prada as Martín Gil
- Manrique Gil as Don Juan Manuel
- Félix Fernandez as Barredo
- Joaquín Pujol
- José Franco as Froilas
- Luisa España as Isabel as a child
- Santiago Rivero
- Julio F. Alymán
- Francisco Hernández as Villafranca
- Elvira Real
- Mercedes Castellanos as María
- Alfonso de Córdoba as Juan
- Fernando Fresno as physician
- Emilio García Ruiz as baby Pedro
- José Jaspe as Estevao
