= Broken Lives (film) =

- Directed by: Eusebio Fernández Ardavín
- Written by: Concha Espina; Wenceslao de Francisco; Críspulo Gotarredonda
- Starring: Lupita Tovar; Maruchi Fresno; Enrique Zabala
- Cinematography: Willy Goldberger; Heinrich Gärtner
- Edited by: H. Rosinski
- Music by: Manfred Gurlitt
- Production company: Inca Film
- Distributed by: Ulargui Films
- Release date: 1935
- Running time: 83 minutes
- Country: Spain
- Language: Spanish

Broken Lives (Spanish:Vidas rotas) is a 1935 Spanish drama film directed by Eusebio Fernández Ardavín and starring Lupita Tovar, Maruchi Fresno and Enrique Zabala. It is based on a short story by Concha Espina.

Contracts with the crew were signed in Barcelona and Madrid in August and September 1934. Filming commenced in October of the same year at CEA Studios in Madrid. The film was produced by INCA Films, it was the company's first sound movie. The premiere took place on 20 April 1935 in Cine Avenida. It was released in the United States in 1935.

== Cast ==
- Lupita Tovar as Marcela
- Maruchi Fresno as Irene
- Enrique Zabala as Andrés Borja
- María Amaya as Carmen
- Manuel Arbó as Músico
- Fernando Fernández de Córdoba as Juan Gras
- Arturo Girelli as Carlitos
- José Isbert as Paco
- Cándida Losada as Catalina
- Manuel París as Alvear
- Luisa Sala
- María Anaya
- Dolores Valero as Campesina
- Paco Álvarez as Fernandito
