= Loyola, the Soldier Saint =

1949 film

- Directed by: José Díaz Morales
- Written by: José María Pemán; Francisco Bonmatí de Codecido; Carlos M. De Heredia; Ricardo Toledo; José Díaz Morales
- Produced by: Juan Mari; Guillermo Calderon; Pedro A. Calderon
- Starring: Rafael Durán; Maruchi Fresno; Manuel Luna
- Cinematography: Theodore J. Pahle
- Edited by: Bienvenida Sanz
- Music by: Manuel Parada
- Production companies: Producciones Calderón; Intercontinental Films
- Distributed by: CEPISCA
- Release date: 1 April 1949
- Running time: 100 minutes
- Country: Spain
- Language: Spanish

Loyola, the Soldier Saint (Spanish: El capitán de Loyola) is a 1949 Spanish historical film directed by José Díaz Morales and starring Rafael Durán, Maruchi Fresno and Manuel Luna. The film portrays the life of Ignatius of Loyola, and was part of a group of lavish historical films made in Spain during the era.

== Cast ==
- Rafael Durán as Íñigo de Loyola
- Maruchi Fresno as Reina Juana
- Manuel Luna as Beltrán
- Asunción Sancho as Marcelilla
- José María Lado as Armador
- José Emilio Álvarez
- María Rosa Salgado as Infanta Catalina
- Francisco Pierrá
- Manuel Dicenta as Pedro Fabro
- Carlos Díaz de Mendoza
- Manuel Kayser
- Eduardo Fajardo
- Arturo Marín as Alcalde de Pamplona
- Manuel Arbó
- Dolores Moreno
- Domingo Rivas
- Manuel Guitián
- María Antonia Giménez
- Rufino Inglés
- José Prada

== Bibliography ==
- D'Lugo, Marvin. Guide to the Cinema of Spain. Greenwood Publishing Group, 1997.
