= Henrique Campos =

Portuguese film director

- Born: 9 February 1909; Santarém, Portugal
- Died: 18 December 1983 (aged 74); Lisbon, Portugal
- Occupations: Film director, screenwriter & actor
- Years active: 1946 — 1978

Henrique Campos (9 February 1909 – 18 December 1983) was a Portuguese film director.

== Selected filmography ==
- Um Homem do Ribatejo (1946)
- The Holy Queen (1947)
- Ribatejo (1949)
- Cantiga da Rua (1950)
- Duas Causas (1953)
- Rosa de Alfama (1953)
- Quando o Mar Galgou a Terra (1954)
- Perdeu-se um Marido (1957)
- O Homem do Dia (1958)
- A Luz Vem do Alto (1959)
- Pão, Amor e... Totobola (1964)
- A Canção da Saudade (1964)
- Estrada da Vida (1968)
- O Ladrão de Quem se Fala (1969)
- O Destino Marca a Hora (1970)
- A Maluquinha de Arroios (1970)
- Os Touros de Mary Foster (1972)
