= Eusebio Fernández Ardavín =

Spanish screenwriter and film director

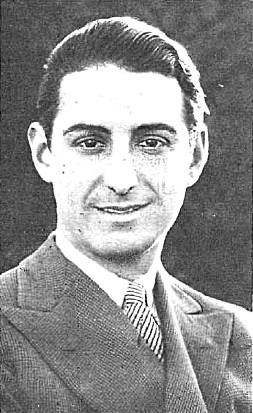
- Fotografía del director y guionista de cine español Eusebio Fernández Ardavín. 1928
- Born: 31 July 1898; Madrid, Spain
- Died: 9 January 1965 (aged 66); Albacete, Spain
- Occupations: Writer, director
- Years active: 1917-1960

Eusebio Fernández Ardavín (1898–1965) was a Spanish screenwriter and film director. He was the brother of the playwright Luis Fernández Ardavín. His nephew César Fernández Ardavín who also became a film director, began his career working for Eusebio.

== Selected filmography ==
- The Girl from Bejar (1926)
- Broken Lives (1933)
- The Moorish Queen (1937)
- The Queen's Flower Girl (1940)
- The Strange Marchioness (1940)
- The Wheel of Life (1942)
- El abanderado (1943)
- Lady in Ermine (1947)
- Neutrality (1949)
- Vertigo (1951)
- The Beauty of Cadiz (1953)

== Bibliography ==
- Bentley, Bernard. A Companion to Spanish Cinema. Boydell & Brewer 2008.
