= A Canção da Saudade =

1964 film

- Directed by: Henrique Campos
- Written by: Cecília Delgado
- Produced by: Francisco de Castro
- Starring: Vítor Gomes; Florbela Queirós
- Cinematography: José Manuel Caixeiro; Alfonso Nieva
- Edited by: Magdalena Pulido
- Production company: Produções Francisco de Castro
- Distributed by: Filmes Ocidente
- Release date: 18 September 1964
- Running time: 95 min
- Country: Portugal
- Language: Portuguese

A Canção da Saudade (lit. 'The Song of Homesickness') is a 1964 Portuguese black-and-white film. The filming took place in a studio at Tóbis Portuguesa, Lisbon and Produções Cinematográficas Perdigão Queiroga. The film reel is 2630 m in length. A Spanish-language film of the same story, which shared the same producers and cast and crew members, was made called Los gatos negros and directed by José Luis Monter.

== Plot ==
A father and son get into conflict because of their different musical styles.

== Cast ==
- Vítor Gomes (actor) - Tony, a singer
- Florbela Queirós - Cilinha (as Florbela)
- Américo Coimbra - Raúl
- Ismael Merlo - Leonel
- Soledad Miranda - Babá
- Luís Cerqueira - (as Luiz Cerqueira)
- Clara Rocha -
- José Manuel Simões -
- Carlos Queirós (actor) - (as Carlos Queiroz)
- Ruy Furtado - (as Rui Furtado)
- Nicolau Breyner -
- Alberto Ghira -
- Fernando Frias -
- Lucía Martos -
- Aníbal Tapadinhas -
- Lídia Franco -
- José Orjas -
- Carlos Rodrigues -
- Jorge Alves (actor) -
- Alberto Ribeiro - Himself - a singer
- Alice Amaro - Herself - a singer
- Tony De Matos - Himself - a singer
- Simone de Oliveira - Herself - a singer
- Madalena Iglésias - Herself - a singer (as Madalena)
- Mara Abrantes - Herself - a singer
- Saudade dos Santos - Herself - a singer
- Rosário San Martin -
- Jorge Fontes -
