= Mara Abrantes =

Brazilian singer (1934–2021)

Mara Dyrce Abrantes da Silva Santos, better known as Mara Abrantes (31 May 1934 – 28 April 2021), was a Brazilian-Portuguese singer and actress known for the films A Canção da Saudade and Malandros em Quarta Dimensão.
