= The Girl from Bejar =

1926 film

- Directed by: Eusebio Fernández Ardavín
- Written by: Eusebio Fernández Ardavín
- Produced by: Eusebio Fernández Ardavín
- Cinematography: Armando Pou
- Music by: Francisco Alonso; Emilio Serrano
- Production company: Producciones Ardavín
- Release date: 3 April 1926
- Country: Spain
- Languages: Silent; Spanish intertitles

The Girl from Bejar (Spanish: La Bejarana) is a 1926 Spanish silent drama film directed by Eusebio Fernández Ardavín.

== Cast ==
- María Luz Callejo
- Luis Comendador
- Celia Escudero
- Luis González 'Don Lince'
- Luis González
- Antonio Mata
- Dolores Moreno
- José Nieto
- Modesto Rivas
- Ángel del Río
- Taquinino

== Bibliography ==
- Eva Woods Peiró. White Gypsies: Race and Stardom in Spanish Musical Films. U of Minnesota Press, 2012.
