= Antonio Quintero =

Cuban cyclist

Personal information
- Born: 20 September 1961 (age 65) Havana, Cuba

Cycling career
- Sport: Cycling

Antonio Quintero (born 20 September 1961) is a Cuban former cyclist. He competed in the individual road race event at the 1980 Summer Olympics.
