= El abanderado =

1943 Spanish film by Eusebio Fernández Ardavín

- Directed by: Eusebio Fernández Ardavín
- Written by: César Fernández Ardavín
- Produced by: Cesáreo González
- Starring: Mercedes Vecino; Alfredo Mayo; Manolo Morán; Salvador Videgain; Guadalupe Muñoz Sampedro
- Music by: Joaquín Turina
- Production company: Suevia Films
- Release date: March 1943
- Running time: 89 minutes
- Country: Spain
- Language: Spanish

El abanderado is a 1943 Spanish historical drama film directed by Eusebio Fernández Ardavín.

== Synopsis ==
Daoíz and Velarde are two Spanish army captains who die in the 2 May 1808 uprising against Napoleon in Madrid. The historical period is a backdrop for personal drama involving the characters, including a romance between Torrealta, a colonel, and Renata, the daughter of a French general.
