= Psycho (1960 film) =

1960 film directed by Alfred Hitchcock

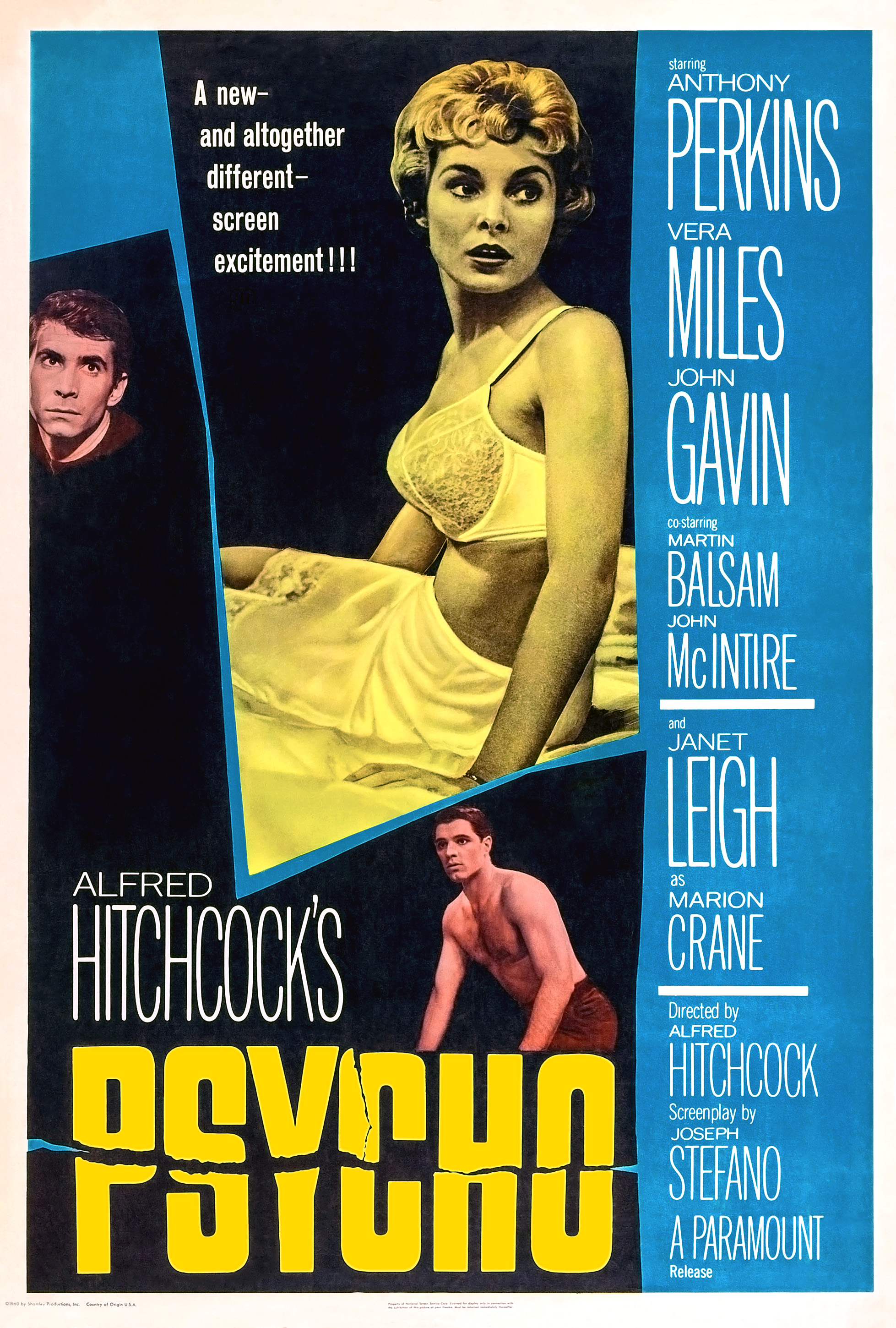
- Theatrical release poster by Macario Gómez Quibus
- Directed by: Alfred Hitchcock
- Screenplay by: Joseph Stefano
- Based on: Psycho; 1959 novel by Robert Bloch
- Produced by: Alfred Hitchcock
- Starring: Anthony Perkins; Vera Miles; John Gavin; Martin Balsam; John McIntire; Janet Leigh
- Cinematography: John L. Russell
- Edited by: George Tomasini
- Music by: Bernard Herrmann
- Production company: Shamley Productions
- Distributed by: Paramount Pictures (Note: After the film's release, Paramount transferred the film rights to Hitchcock, who later sold the distribution rights to Universal Pictures in 1962.)
- Release dates: June 16, 1960 (New York City); September 8, 1960 (United States)
- Running time: 109 minutes
- Country: United States
- Language: English
- Budget: $806,947
- Box office: $50 million

Psycho is a 1960 American horror and thriller film produced and directed by Alfred Hitchcock. The screenplay, written by Joseph Stefano, is based on the 1959 novel by Robert Bloch. The film stars Anthony Perkins, Janet Leigh, Vera Miles, John Gavin, and Martin Balsam. The plot centers on an encounter between on-the-run embezzler Marion Crane (Leigh), shy motel proprietor Norman Bates (Perkins), and his disturbed mother. A private investigator (Balsam), Marion's lover Sam Loomis (Gavin), and her sister Lila (Miles) investigate Marion's subsequent disappearance.

Psycho was seen as a departure from Hitchcock's previous film, North by Northwest (1959), as it was filmed on a small budget in black-and-white by the crew of his television series Alfred Hitchcock Presents. Initially the film divided critics due to its controversial subject matter, but audience interest and outstanding box-office returns prompted a major critical re-evaluation. Psycho was a massive commercial success; with a budget of US$806,947 (equivalent to $8.8 million in 2025), the film earned $50 million (equivalent to $544 million in 2025) at the box office worldwide, not including the revenue from rentals. Psycho was nominated for four Academy Awards, including Best Director for Hitchcock and Best Supporting Actress for Leigh.

Psycho is now considered one of Hitchcock's best films (Note: Psycho is the top listed Hitchcock film in The 100 Greatest Movies of All Time by Entertainment Weekly, and the highest Hitchcock film on AFI's 100 Years...100 Movies.) and is arguably his most famous and influential work. It has been hailed as a major work of cinematic art by international film critics and scholars who praise its slick direction, tense atmosphere, impressive camerawork, memorable score, and iconic performances. Additionally the shower scene has become one of the best-known scenes in all of cinema. It is regarded as "the most heavily analyzed film in the long career of the most investigated director in the history of American film" and is often ranked among the greatest films of all time. It set a new level of acceptability for violence, deviant behavior, and sexuality in American films, and it has been considered to be one of the earliest examples of the slasher film genre. After Hitchcock's death in 1980, Universal Pictures produced follow-ups: three sequels, a remake, a made-for-television spin-off, and a television series. In 1992, the Library of Congress deemed the film "culturally, historically, or aesthetically significant" and selected it for preservation in the United States National Film Registry.

== Plot ==
Original trailer for Psycho

In Phoenix, Arizona, real estate secretary Marion Crane embezzles $40,000 (Note: US$40,000 is equivalent to $435,000 in 2025) in cash from her employer after hearing her boyfriend, Sam Loomis, complain that his debts are delaying their marriage. She sets off to drive to Sam's home in the town of Fairvale, California, switching cars in Bakersfield after an encounter with a suspicious policeman. A rainstorm forces Marion to stop at the secluded Bates Motel a few miles from Fairvale. Norman Bates, the proprietor, whose house overlooks the motel, registers Marion (who uses an alias) and invites her to dinner with him in the motel's office. When Norman returns to his house to retrieve the food, Marion overhears him arguing with his mother about his desire to dine with Marion. After returning, he discusses his hobby as a taxidermist, his mother's "illness", and how everyone is in a "private trap" they cannot escape. When Marion suggests that Norman should have his mother institutionalized, he becomes agitated and insists that she is harmless.

Marion decides to drive back to Phoenix in the morning to return the stolen money. As she showers, a shadowy figure enters the bathroom with a kitchen knife and stabs her to death. Moments later, Norman runs to the motel to find Marion dead. He hurriedly cleans up the murder scene and places Marion's body, her belongings, and, unbeknownst to him, the hidden cash in her car before sinking the vehicle in a swamp.

Marion's sister Lila arrives in Fairvale a week later, tells Sam about the theft, and demands information about Marion's whereabouts. He denies knowing anything about Marion's disappearance. Arbogast, a private investigator, approaches them, stating that he has been hired to retrieve the money. He stops at the Bates Motel and questions Norman, whose nervousness and inconsistent answers arouse his suspicion. Arbogast examines the guest register and discovers from some handwriting in it that Marion spent a night in the motel. When Arbogast infers from his conversation with Norman that Marion had spoken to his mother, Arbogast asks to speak to her, but Norman refuses. Arbogast leaves and calls Lila to tell her of his suspicions. When he returns and enters the Bateses' house to search for Norman's mother, a shadowy figure at the top of the stairs stabs him to death.

When Sam and Lila do not hear back from Arbogast, Sam goes to the motel to look for him. Sam spots a silhouette in a second-floor window of the house and assumes it is Norman's mother, who is unresponsive to Sam's calls. Lila and Sam alert the local sheriff, Al Chambers, who tells them Norman's mother killed herself and her lover with strychnine poisoning 10 years earlier. Chambers suggests that Arbogast lied to Sam and Lila so he could pursue Marion and the money.

Convinced that something happened to Arbogast, Lila and Sam drive to the motel and check in. Sam distracts Norman in the office while Lila sneaks into the Bateses' house. Suspicious, Norman knocks Sam out. As Norman heads to the house, Lila hides in the fruit cellar and discovers the mummified body of Norman's mother. Lila screams in horror, and Norman, wearing a dress and a wig, enters the cellar and attacks her with a knife, only to be subdued by a recovered Sam.

At the police station, a psychiatrist explains to Lila, Sam, and Chambers that Norman murdered his domineering mother and her lover out of jealousy. Unable to bear the guilt, he stole his mother's corpse and treated it as if she were still alive, then re-created his mother as an alternate personality, as jealous and possessive toward Norman as she had been in life. Whenever Norman was attracted to a woman, "Mother" would take over; under the "Mother" personality, Norman killed two women before he killed Marion and Arbogast. The psychiatrist concludes that "Mother" has now completely submerged Norman's personality. Norman sits in a jail cell and hears his mother's voice stating the murders were his doing and that she would never be suspected. Marion's car is towed from the swamp.

== Cast ==
- Anthony Perkins as Norman Bates
- Vera Miles as Lila Crane
- John Gavin as Sam Loomis
- Martin Balsam as Private Investigator Milton Arbogast
- John McIntire as Deputy Sheriff Al Chambers
- Simon Oakland as Dr. Richman
- Frank Albertson as Tom Cassidy
- Pat Hitchcock as Caroline
- Vaughn Taylor as George Lowery
- Lurene Tuttle as Mrs. Chambers
- John Anderson as California Charlie
- Mort Mills as Highway Patrol Officer
- Janet Leigh as Marion Crane

Virginia Gregg, Paul Jasmin, and Jeanette Nolan make uncredited appearances as the voice of Norma "Mother" Bates. The three voices were used interchangeably, except for the speech in the final scene, which was performed entirely by Gregg.

== Production ==
=== Development ===
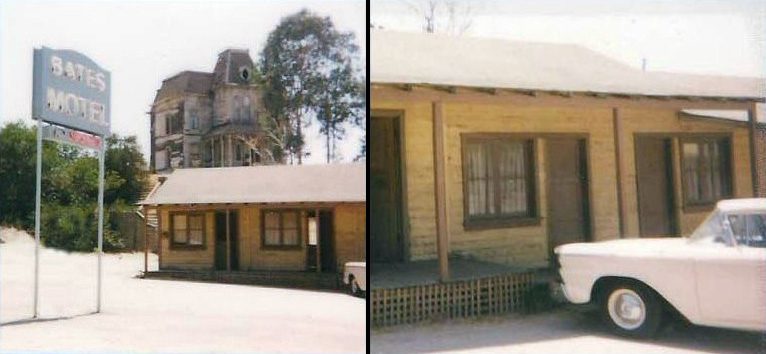
The Psycho set on the Universal Studios Lot, featuring a Ford Custom 300 similar to that driven by Janet Leigh in the film, is now part of the studio tour at the Universal Studios Hollywood theme park.

Psycho is based on Robert Bloch's 1959 novel of the same name, loosely inspired by the case of convicted Wisconsin murderer and grave robber Ed Gein. Both Gein and the story's protagonist were solitary murderers in isolated rural locations. Each had a deceased, domineering mother and had sealed off a room in the house as a shrine to her. While Bates dressed in women's clothes, Gein dressed in the skins of the women he dug up. Gein was apprehended after murdering two women.

Peggy Robertson, Hitchcock's long-time assistant, read Anthony Boucher's positive review of the novel in his "Criminals at Large" column in The New York Times and decided to show the book to her employer; however, studio readers at Paramount Pictures had already rejected its premise for a film. Hitchcock acquired rights to the novel for $9,500 and reportedly ordered Robertson to buy all copies to preserve the novel's surprises. Hitchcock, who had come to face genre competitors whose works were critically compared to his own, was seeking new material to recover from two aborted projects with Paramount: Flamingo Feather and No Bail for the Judge. He disliked stars' salary demands and trusted only a few people to choose prospective material, including Robertson.

Paramount executives balked at Hitchcock's proposal and refused to provide his usual budget. In response Hitchcock offered to film Psycho quickly and cheaply in black and white using the crew from his television series Alfred Hitchcock Presents. Paramount executives rejected this cost-conscious approach, claiming their soundstages were booked, but the industry was in a slump. Hitchcock countered that he would personally finance the project and shoot it at Universal-International using his Shamley Productions crew if Paramount would distribute the film. In lieu of his usual $250,000 director's fee, he proposed a 60% stake in the film negative. This combined offer was accepted, and Hitchcock went ahead in spite of naysaying from producer Herbert Coleman and Shamley Productions executive Joan Harrison.

=== Screenplay ===
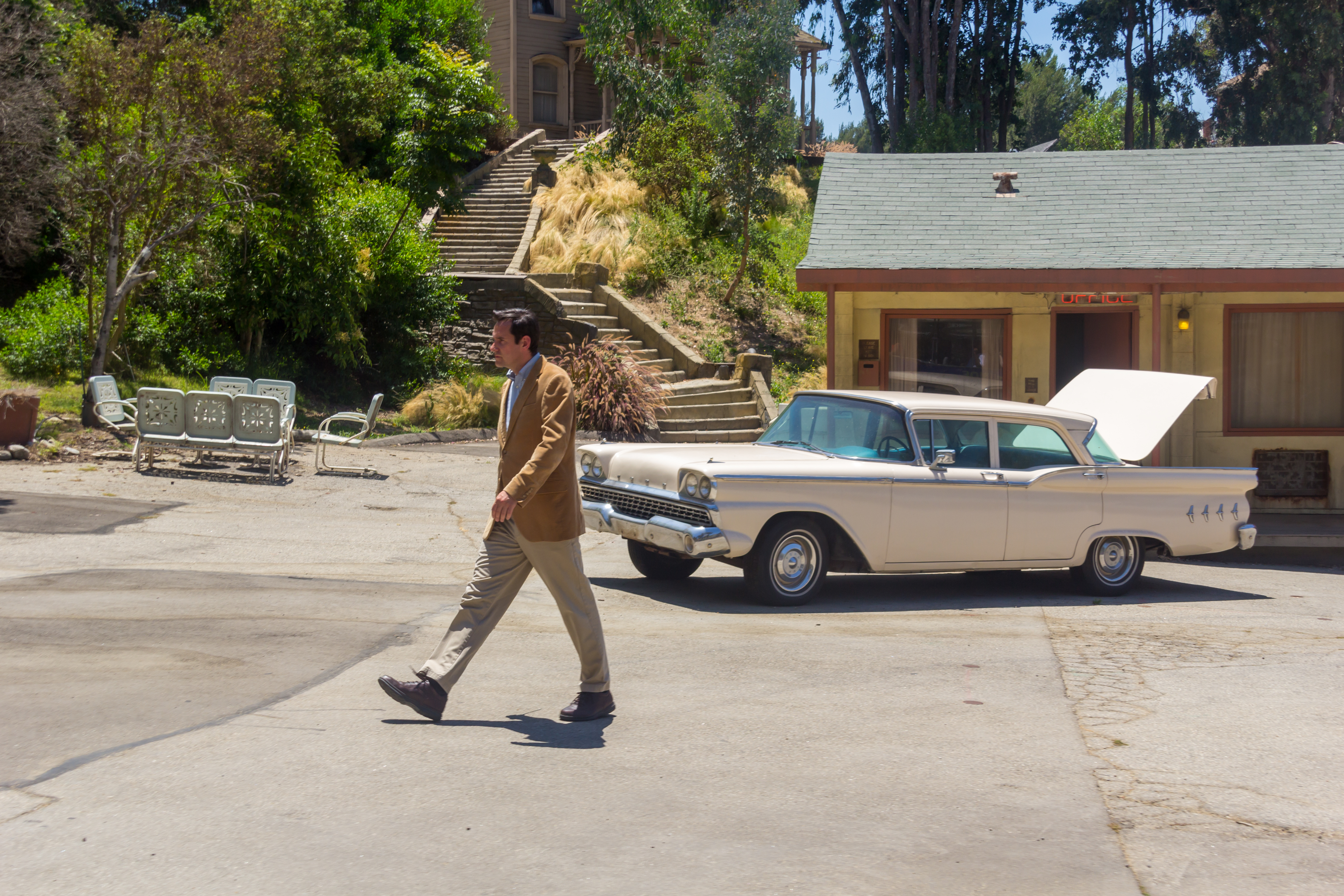
A recreation of a scene from the film as part of the Universal Studio Tour

James P. Cavanagh, a writer on Alfred Hitchcock Presents, wrote the first draft of the screenplay. Hitchcock felt the script dragged and read like a television short horror story, an assessment shared by an assistant. Although Joseph Stefano had worked on only one film before, Hitchcock agreed to meet him. Despite Stefano's inexperience, the meeting went well and he was hired.

The screenplay is relatively faithful to the novel, with a few significant changes by Hitchcock and Stefano. Stefano found the character of Norman Bates unsympathetic—in the book, he is middle-aged, overweight, and more overtly unstable—but became more intrigued when Hitchcock suggested casting Anthony Perkins. Stefano eliminated Bates's alcoholism, which necessitated removing Bates' "becoming" the mother personality when in a drunken stupor. Also removed was Bates's interest in spiritualism, the occult, and pornography. Hitchcock and Stefano elected to open the film with scenes of Marion's life and not introduce Bates at all until the twenty-minute mark, rather than open with Bates reading a history book as Bloch does. Writer Joseph W. Smith observes that Marion's story "occupies only two of the novel's 17 chapters. Hitchcock and Stefano expanded this to nearly half the narrative".

Smith likewise mentions the absence of a hotel tryst between Marion and Sam in the novel. For Stefano the conversation between Marion and Norman in the hotel parlor, in which she displays maternal sympathy toward him, makes it possible for the audience to have more sympathy for Norman after Marion's murder. When Lila is looking through Norman's bedroom in the film, she opens a book with a blank cover whose contents are unseen; in the novel, these are "pathologically pornographic" illustrations. Stefano wanted to give the audience "indications that something was quite wrong, but it could not be spelled out or overdone". In his book of conversations with Hitchcock, François Truffaut says the novel "cheats" by having extended conversations between Norman and "Mother" and stating what Mother is "doing" at various given moments.

The first name of the female protagonist was changed from Mary to Marion because a real Mary Crane lived in Phoenix. Also changed is the novel's budding romance between Sam and Lila. Hitchcock preferred to focus the audience's attention on the solution to the mystery, and Stefano thought such a relationship would make Sam seem cheap. Instead of having Sam explain Norman's pathology to Lila, the film uses a psychiatrist. Stefano was in therapy dealing with his relationship with his own mother while writing the script. The novel is more violent than the film: Marion is decapitated in the shower rather than stabbed to death. Minor changes include swapping out Marion's tell-tale earring found after her death with a scrap of paper that failed to flush down the toilet. This provided some shock effect because toilets were almost never seen in American cinema at the time of the film's release. The location of Arbogast's death was moved from the house's foyer to the staircase. Stefano thought this would make it easier to conceal the truth about "Mother" without tipping that something was being hidden. As Leigh put it, this gave Hitchcock more options for his camera.

=== Pre-production ===
Paramount Pictures, whose contract guaranteed another film from Hitchcock, did not want him to make Psycho. Paramount was expecting No Bail for the Judge, but Hitchcock had scrapped the production after star Audrey Hepburn became pregnant and bowed out. The studio's official stance was that Bloch's book was "too repulsive" and "impossible for films", and nothing but another of Hitchcock's star-studded mystery thrillers would suffice. Paramount did not like "anything about [the book] at all" and denied Hitchcock his usual budget.

In response Hitchcock made the film through his own Shamley Productions, shooting at Universal Studios under the Revue Studios production unit. The original exteriors of the Bates Motel and Bates house, which were constructed on the same stage as Lon Chaney's The Phantom of the Opera (1925), are still standing at the Universal Studios backlot in Universal City near Hollywood and are a regular attraction on the studio's tour.

To cut costs further, Hitchcock chose to film Psycho in black and white, keeping the budget under $1 million. Another reason for this was Hitchcock's desire to prevent the shower scene from being too gory.

As an additional cost-cutting measure, and because he was most comfortable around them, Hitchcock used most of his Shamley Productions crew from his television series Alfred Hitchcock Presents, including cinematographer John L. Russell, art directors Robert Clatworthy and Joseph Hurley, set decorator George Milo, script supervisor Marshall Schlom, and assistant director Hilton A. Green. He hired regular collaborators Bernard Herrmann as the music composer, George Tomasini as editor, and Saul Bass for the title design and storyboarding of the shower scene. In all, his crew cost $62,000.

Through the strength of his reputation, Hitchcock cast Leigh for a quarter of her usual fee, paying only $25,000 (in the 1967 book Hitchcock/Truffaut, Hitchcock said that Leigh owed Paramount one final film on her seven-year contract which she had signed in 1953). His first choice, Leigh agreed having only read the novel and making no inquiry into her salary. Her co-star Anthony Perkins agreed to $40,000. Both stars were experienced and proven box-office draws.

Paramount distributed the film, but four years later Hitchcock sold his stock in Shamley to Universal's parent company MCA, and his remaining six films were made at and distributed by Universal Pictures. After another four years Paramount sold all rights to Universal.

=== Filming ===
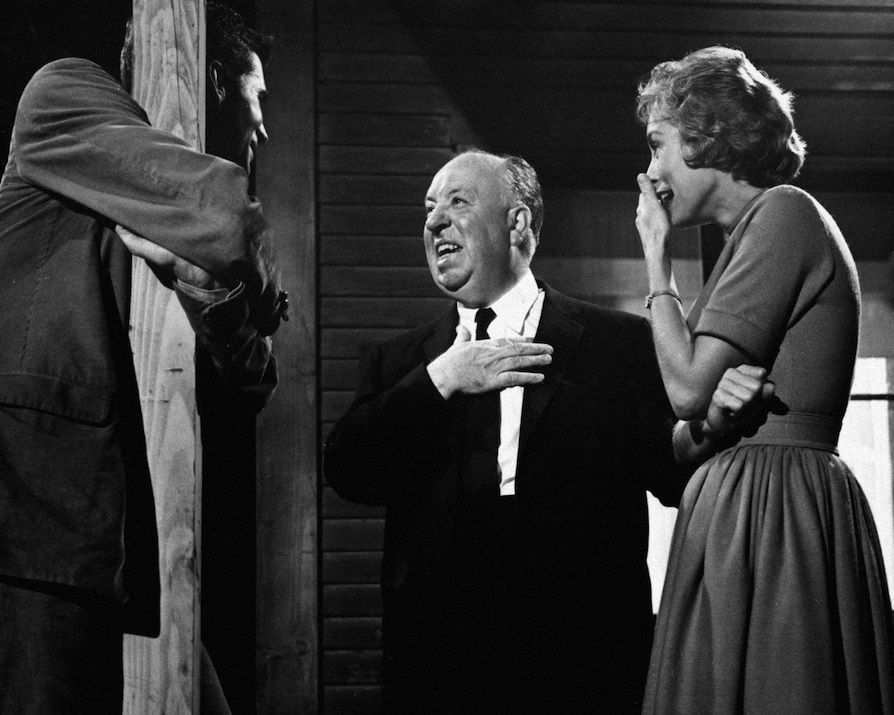
Perkins, Hitchcock, and Leigh conversing on the set of Psycho

Psycho, independently produced and financed by Hitchcock, was shot at Revue Studios, the same location for his television show, on a tight budget of $807,000, from November 11, 1959, to February 1, 1960. Filming would start in the morning and finish by six p.m., or earlier on Thursdays when Hitchcock and his wife would dine at Chasen's. Nearly the whole film was shot with 50mm lenses on 35mm cameras. This provided a field of vision that was similar to a human's, which helped to further involve the audience.

Before principal photography began in November, Hitchcock dispatched Green to Phoenix to scout locations and shoot the opening scene. It was supposed to be an aerial shot of Phoenix that slowly descended to zoom through a window into the hotel room where Marion and Sam have their passionate rendez-vous. Ultimately the helicopter footage proved too shaky and had to be spliced with footage from the studio. Another crew filmed day and night footage on Highway 99 between Gorman and Fresno, California, for projection when Marion drives from Phoenix. Footage of her driving into Bakersfield to trade her car is also shown. They also provided the location shots for the scene in which Marion is discovered sleeping in her car by the suspicious policeman. In one street scene shot in downtown Phoenix, Christmas decorations were discovered to be visible; rather than re-shoot the footage, Hitchcock chose to add on-screen text to the opening scene marking the date as "Friday, December the Eleventh".

Green also took photos of a prepared list of 140 locations for reconstruction later in the studio. These included many real estate offices and homes such as those belonging to Marion and her sister. He also found a girl who looked just as he imagined Marion and photographed her whole wardrobe, which would enable Hitchcock to demand realistic looks from Helen Colvig, the wardrobe supervisor. The look of the Bates house was modeled on Edward Hopper's painting House by the Railroad, a fanciful portrait of the Second Empire Victorian home at 18 Conger Avenue in Haverstraw, New York.

Lead actors Perkins and Leigh were given the freedom to interpret their roles and improvise as long as it did not involve moving the camera. An example of Perkins' improvisation is Norman's habit of eating candy corn. Throughout filming, Hitchcock created and hid various versions of the "Mother corpse" prop in Leigh's dressing room closet. Leigh took the joke well and wondered whether it was done to keep her in suspense or to judge which corpse would be scarier for the audience.

Hitchcock was uncharacteristically forced to do retakes for some scenes. The final shot in the shower scene, which starts with an extreme close-up on Marion's eye and zooms in and out, proved difficult for Leigh because the water splashing in her eyes made her want to blink, and the cameraman had trouble as well because he had to manually focus while moving the camera. Retakes were required for the opening scene because Hitchcock felt that Leigh and Gavin were not passionate enough. Leigh had trouble saying "Not inordinately" for the real estate office scene, requiring additional retakes. Lastly the scene in which "Mother" is discovered required complicated coordination of the chair turning around, Vera Miles (as Lila) hitting the light bulb, and a lens flare, which proved to be difficult. Hitchcock insisted on retakes until all three elements coalesced to his satisfaction.

According to Hitchcock, a series of shots with Arbogast going up the stairs in the Bates house before he is stabbed were directed by Green based on Bass' storyboards while Hitchcock was incapacitated by a cold. However, upon viewing the dailies, Hitchcock was forced to scrap them. He claimed they were "no good" because they did not portray "an innocent person but a sinister man who was going up those stairs". Hitchcock later re-shot the scene, though a little of the cut footage made its way into the film. Filming the murder of Arbogast was problematic, owing to the overhead camera angle necessary to hide the film's twist. A dolly track constructed on pulleys alongside the stairway, together with a chair-like device, had to be constructed and thoroughly tested over a period of weeks.

The shadowy figure from the shower scene

Alfred Hitchcock's cameo is a signature occurrence in most of his films. In Psycho he can be seen through a window—wearing a Stetson hat—standing outside Marion's workplace. Wardrobe mistress Rita Riggs has said that Hitchcock chose this scene for his cameo so that he could be in a scene with his daughter, who played Marion's colleague. Others have suggested that he chose this early appearance in the film to avoid distracting the audience.

The murder of Leigh's character in the shower is the film's pivotal scene and one of the best-known in all of cinema. The scene was shot December 17–23, 1959, after Leigh had twice postponed filming—first because of a cold and then because of her menstrual period. The finished scene runs some three minutes, and its production has resulted in several myths and stories. These include claims from Bass about credit and varying misconceptions about Leigh's filming experience.

== Soundtrack ==
=== Score ===
Hitchcock insisted that Bernard Herrmann write the score for Psycho despite the composer's refusal to accept a reduced fee for the film's lower budget. The resulting score, according to Christopher Palmer in The Composer in Hollywood (1990) is "perhaps Herrmann's most spectacular Hitchcock achievement". Hitchcock was pleased with the tension and drama the score added to the film, later remarking "33% of the effect of Psycho was due to the music" and that "Psycho depended heavily on Herrmann's music for its tension and sense of pervading doom".

Herrmann used the lowered music budget to his advantage by writing for a string orchestra rather than a full symphonic ensemble, contrary to Hitchcock's request for a jazz score. He thought of the single-tone color of the all-string soundtrack as a way of reflecting the black-and-white cinematography of the film. The strings play con sordini (muted) for all the music other than the shower scene, creating a darker and more intense effect. Film composer Fred Steiner, in an analysis of the score to Psycho, points out that string instruments gave Herrmann access to a wider range in tone, dynamics, and instrumental special effects than any other single instrumental group would have.

The main title music, a tense, hurtling piece, sets the tone of impending violence and returns three times on the soundtrack. Though nothing shocking occurs during the first 15–20 minutes of the film, the title music remains in the audience's mind, lending tension to these early scenes. Herrmann also maintains tension through the slower moments in the film through the use of ostinato.

In 1968 Herrmann reworked his original score into a concert piece named Psycho: A Narrative for String Orchestra, which he recorded with the London Philharmonic Orchestra the following year. Most of the suite, which included new music, subsequently went missing. In 1999, the conductor John Mauceri, with the help of Herrmann's widow, reconstructed the suite and edited it for publication. He produced a second edition in 2013 that restored Herrmann's notated string bowings.

To honor the fiftieth anniversary of Psycho, in July 2010, the San Francisco Symphony had a print of the film created with the music removed from the soundtrack and projected it on a large screen in Davies Symphony Hall, while the orchestra performed the score live. This was previously mounted by the Seattle Symphony in October 2009 as well, performing at the Benaroya Hall for two consecutive evenings. There have subsequently been other screenings of the film with live orchestras playing the score, including three New York Philharmonic presentations in October/November 2025, with one screening/performance on Halloween night.

=== Recordings ===
Several albums of the film score have been released, including:

- October 2, 1975, recording with Bernard Herrmann conducting the National Philharmonic Orchestra [Unicorn CD, 1993].
- The 1997 Varèse Sarabande CD features a re-recording of the complete score performed by the Royal Scottish National Orchestra and conducted by Joel McNeely.
- The 1998 Soundstage Records SCD 585 CD claims to feature the tracks from the original master tapes, but it has been asserted that the release is a bootleg recording.

== Censorship and taboos ==
Psycho is a prime example of the type of film that appeared in the United States during the 1960s after the erosion of the Production Code. It was unprecedented in its depiction of sexuality and violence, right from the opening scene in which Sam and Marion are shown as lovers sharing a bed, with Marion in a bra. In the Production Code standards of that time, unmarried couples shown in the same bed would have been taboo.

Another issue was the gender nonconformity. Perkins, who was homosexual, and Hitchcock, who previously made Rope (1948), were both experienced in the film's transgressive subject matter. The viewer is unaware of Bates's crossdressing until, at the end of the film, it is revealed during the attempted murder of Lila. At the station, Sam asks why Bates was dressed that way. The policeman concludes that Bates is a transvestite. The psychiatrist corrects him, explaining that Bates believes he is his own mother when wearing her clothes.

Scholars of gender studies argue that the film's depiction of Bates would be best described as both transgender and a cross-dresser (over a transvestite, as the policeman labels him) because when Bates is under the "Mother" personality he transforms into "a woman trapped in a man's body", a uniquely transgender experience. The same queer scholars also note that "the gender and sexuality queerness surrounding Norman and his mother is hardly a cause for celebration."

The shower scene was notably affected by the censorship. Another cause of concern for the censors was that Marion was shown flushing a toilet, with its contents (torn-up note paper) fully visible. No flushing toilet had appeared in mainstream film and television in the United States at that time. The British Board of Film Classification (BBFC) required cuts to stabbing sounds and visible nude shots. In New Zealand, the shot of Norman washing blood from his hands was deemed disgusting. In Singapore, though the shower scene was left untouched, the murder of Arbogast and a shot of Norman's mother's corpse were removed. In Ireland, censor Gerry O'Hara banned it upon his initial viewing in 1960. The next year, a highly edited version missing some 47 feet of film was submitted to the Irish censor. O'Hara ultimately requested that an additional seven cuts be made: the line where Marion tells Sam to put his shoes on (which implied that he had his pants or trousers off), two shots of Norman spying on Marion through the hole in the wall, Marion's undressing, the shots of Marion's blood flowing down the shower, the shots of Norman washing his hands when blood is visible, repeated incidents of stabbings ("One stab is surely enough", wrote O'Hara), the words "in bed" from the sheriff's wife's line, "Norman found them dead together in bed", and Arbogast's questions to Norman about whether he spent the night with Marion. In 1986, the uncut version of Psycho was accepted by the BBFC, which classified it at 15.

== Release ==
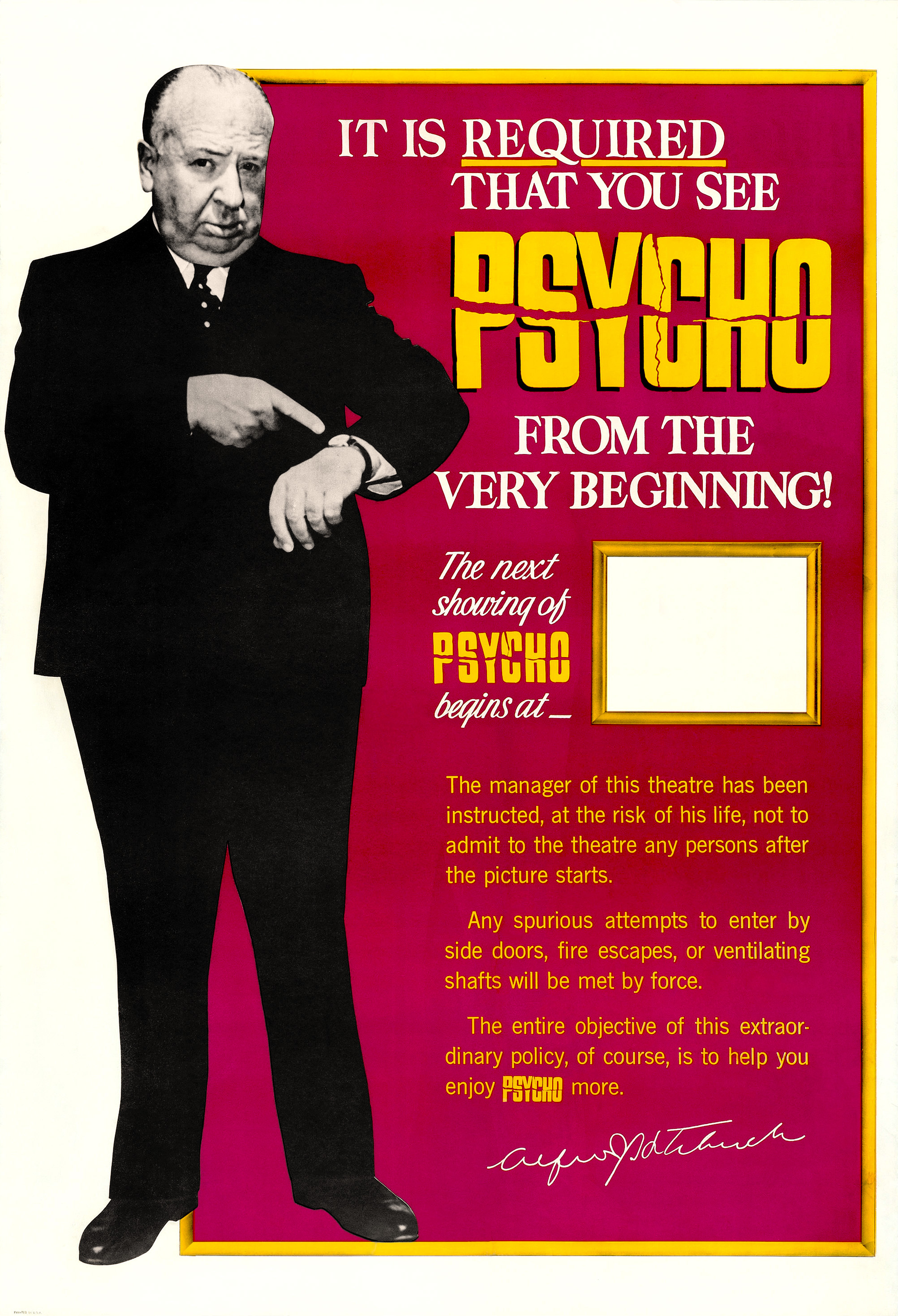
Hitchcock enforced a "no late admission" policy during the theatrical release of Psycho, which was unusual for the time.

The film was released on June 16, 1960, at the DeMille Theatre and the Baronet Theatre in New York City. It was the first film sold in the US on the basis that no one would be admitted to the theater after the film had started.

Hitchcock's "no late admission" policy for the film was unusual for the time. It was not an entirely original publicity strategy as Clouzot had done the same in France for Les Diaboliques (1955). Hitchcock believed people who entered the theater late and thus never saw the appearance of star actress Janet Leigh would feel cheated. At first theater owners opposed the idea, thinking they would lose business. However, after the first day, the owners enjoyed long lines of people waiting to see the film. Shortly before the release of Psycho, Hitchcock promised a film in "the Diabolique manner".

The week after the New York premiere, the film opened at the Paramount Theatre, Boston; the Woods Theatre, Chicago, and the Arcadia Theatre, Philadelphia. After nine weeks of release at the DeMille and the Baronet, the film was released in neighborhood New York theaters, the first time a film had played on Broadway and the neighborhood theaters simultaneously.

=== Promotion ===
Hitchcock did most of the promotion himself, forbidding Leigh and Perkins to make the usual television, radio, and print interviews for fear of them revealing the plot. Even critics were not given private screenings but rather had to see the film with the general public, which may have affected their reviews.

The film's original trailer features a jovial Hitchcock taking the viewer on a tour of the set and almost giving away plot details before stopping himself. It is "tracked" with Herrmann's Psycho theme, but also jovial music from Hitchcock's comedy The Trouble with Harry; most of Hitchcock's dialogue is post-synchronized. The trailer features Vera Miles with a blonde wig in place of Leigh, as she was no longer available for filming at the time.

=== Rating ===
Psycho has been rated and re-rated several times over the years by the MPAA. Upon its initial release, the film received a certificate stating that it was "Approved" (certificate #19564) under the simple pass/fail system of the Production Code in use at that time. Later, when the MPAA switched to a voluntary letter ratings system in 1968, Psycho was one of a number of high-profile motion pictures to be retro-rated with an "M" (Suggested for mature audiences: Parental discretion advised) for further distribution. This remained the only rating the film would receive for 16 years, and according to the guidelines of the time "M" was the equivalent of a "PG" rating. In 1984, amidst a controversy surrounding the levels of violence depicted in "PG"-rated films in the VCR era, the film was re-classified to its current rating of "R".

=== Re-release ===
The film had another successful theatrical reissue in 1969. The film was re-released to cinemas on September 20 and 23, 2015, as part of the "TCM Presents" series by Turner Classic Movies and Fathom Events.

=== Television ===
CBS purchased the television rights for $450,000. CBS planned to televise the film on September 23, 1966, as an installment of its new movie night The CBS Friday Night Movies. Three days prior to the scheduled telecast, Valerie Percy, daughter of Illinois senate candidate Charles H. Percy, was murdered. As her parents slept mere feet away, she was stabbed a dozen times with a double-edged knife. In light of the murder, CBS agreed to postpone the broadcast. As a result of the Apollo 1 fire on January 27, 1967, the network again postponed the screening of Psycho.

Shortly afterward Paramount included the film in its first syndicated package of post-1950 movies, "Portfolio I". WABC-TV in New York City was the first station in the country to air Psycho (with some scenes significantly edited), on its late-night movie series, The Best of Broadway, on June 24, 1967.

The film finally made its way to general television broadcast in one of Universal's syndicated programming packages for local stations in 1970. Psycho was aired for 20 years in this format, then leased to cable for two years before returning to syndication as part of the "List of a Lifetime" package.

=== Home media ===
The film has been released several times on CED, VHS, LaserDisc, DVD and Blu-ray. DiscoVision first released Psycho on the LaserDisc format in "standard play" (five sides) in 1979, and "extended play" (two sides) in October 1981. MCA/Universal Home Video released a new LaserDisc version of Psycho in August 1988 (Catalog #: 11003). In May 1998, Universal Studios Home Video released a deluxe edition of Psycho as part of their Signature Collection. This THX-certified Widescreen (1.85:1) LaserDisc Deluxe Edition (Catalog #: 43105) is spread across four extended-play sides and one standard-play side, and includes a new documentary and isolated Bernard Herrmann score. A DVD edition was released at the same time as the LaserDisc.

A version of the film with extended footage of Marion undressing (showing her taking off her bra), Norman cleaning up after the murder, and Arbogast's death (in which he is stabbed four times instead of two) has been shown on German TV, and was released there on Blu-ray in 2015. This footage may have been cut from the US version of the film in 1968 before the re-release of the movie after the ratings system was first established by the MPAA; these cuts were mandated by the National Legion of Decency.

For the DVD release, Laurent Bouzereau produced a documentary looking at the film's production and reception. Universal released a 50th anniversary edition on Blu-ray in the United Kingdom on August 9, 2010, with Australia making the same edition (with a different cover) available on September 1. To mark the film's 50th anniversary, a Blu-ray in the U.S. was released on October 19, 2010, featuring yet another cover. The film is also included on two different Alfred Hitchcock Blu-ray box-sets from Universal.

The film was released on 4K UHD Blu-ray as part of The Alfred Hitchcock Classics Collection in September 2020, along with an individual "60th anniversary" Blu-ray release as well. This release includes the extended footage from the German release, making it the first time that these scenes were presented to US home video audiences as Hitchcock intended.

== Reception ==
=== Critical reception ===
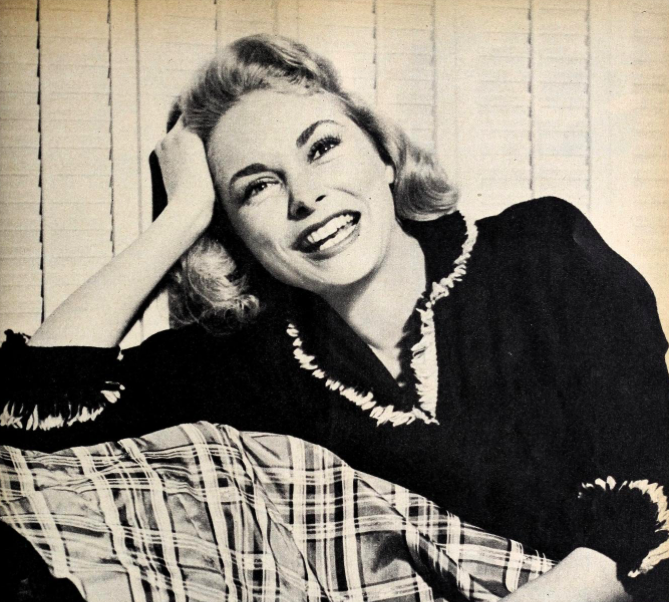
Janet Leigh (pictured in 1955) received an Oscar nomination and won a Golden Globe for her performance in the film.

Immediate reviews and reactions from critics were extremely polarized. Bosley Crowther of The New York Times wrote: "There is not an abundance of subtlety or the lately familiar Hitchcock bent toward significant and colorful scenery in this obviously low-budget job". Crowther called the "slow buildups to sudden shocks" reliably melodramatic but contested Hitchcock's psychological points, reminiscent of Krafft-Ebing's studies, as less effective. While the film did not conclude satisfactorily for the critic, he commended the cast's performances as "fair". British critic C. A. Lejeune was so offended that she not only walked out before the end, but permanently resigned her post as film critic for The Observer. Other negative reviews stated, "a blot on an honorable career", "plainly a gimmick movie", and "merely one of those television shows padded out to two hours". The Catholic Legion of Decency gave the film a B rating, meaning "morally objectionable in part".

Critics from other New York newspapers, such as the Daily News, Daily Mirror, and Village Voice were positive, writing: "Anthony Perkins' performance is the best of his career ... Janet Leigh has never been better", "played out beautifully", and "first American movie since Touch of Evil (1958) to stand in the same creative rank as the great European films", respectively. A mixed review from the New York Herald Tribune stated it was "rather difficult to be amused at the forms insanity may take [but nonetheless] keeps your attention like a snake-charmer". The Los Angeles Times' Philip K. Scheuer remarked, in another mixed review, that the film was "one of [Hitchcock's] most brilliantly directed shockers and also his most disagreeable". The film ranked ninth on Cahiers du Cinéma's Top 10 Films of the Year List in 1960.

It was also well received in Florida, where the Miami Herald's Jack Anderson wrote that "the pudgy master of suspense has dished up a real shocker. And I mean shocker. Psycho saws away at every nerve right from its first scene with Janet Leigh in her unmentionables to its last gruesome moment". Robin Barrett of the St. Petersburg Times wrote that "it's got all the ingredients of a typical Hitchcock if Hitchcock can be termed in any way "typical", and it's definitely his best effort to date, but it's unlike anything he's done in the past. Mr. H. has pledged us not to reveal the shocking ending or talk about the bizarre plot and shaking fear of diabolical Hitchcock reprisals — we won't".

The film opened to slightly more muted praise in Washington, D.C. Richard L. Coe of The Washington Post called it "marvelously gruesome [...] the sort of eerie, creaky, gobby Snap-Apple-Night that will find many sharooshed and others liverish". Harry MacArthur of Washington Evening Star wrote that "Alfred Hitchcock lets his well-known glee with the gruesome romp all over the place in Psycho, latest of his excursions in mayhem and suspense, at the Town Theater. This is a movie he might have made to prove the truth of his oft-quoted statement that he makes pictures for his own amusement. This does not mean, of course, that other moviegoers will not be amused—or shocked or even scared out of their wit by Psycho. It does mean that this is a somewhat transparent example of the master's work in that you can see him sitting there behind it fiendishly dreaming up shocking situations for the sake of shock alone". Don Maclean of The Washington Daily News urged the reader to "go see it if you like movies that shake you up. But if you're afraid to go in your house afterwards and keep watching behind you the rest of the night, don't blame me".

A critic who used the Mae Tinee pseudonym in the Chicago Daily Tribune wrote that "the old pro really poured it on in this production. I'm sure the wily Mr. Hitchcock had fun making this one. He used his camera with a sharp skill to achieve shock value the staring eye, the flowing blood, the sudden plunge of a knife. Audiences react much as they do on a high ride, giggling with nerves and excitement". In Buffalo, Jeanette Eichel of the Buffalo Evening News remarked that "Alfred Hitchcock, master of mystery, fuses fear and suspense in his shiver-and-shock show Psycho in the Paramount Theater. His pride is that he does not let an audience down by misleading it. His clues are honest and few persons guess the outcome. He especially asked in an epilogue that patrons not betray the ending".

A more mixed review came courtesy of Marjory Adams of the Boston Daily Globe, who wrote that it "is far more macabre and mysterious than any of his previous full-length features. However, the settings are dreary and lack those magnificent backgrounds which Hitchcock employed so effectively in North by Northwest, Vertigo and To Catch a Thief. Perhaps the old mystery master has been more influenced in Psycho by his television programs than by his own classics such as 39 Steps and Notorious. However, he gives the audience its money's worth. You see two murders committed, with accompanying gore and grisly details. There are so many shocks the theater might be connected to an electric battery".

Helen Bower of the Detroit Free Press was appalled by the film, opening her article by writing: "Gee, whiz, Mr. Hitchcock! Stick to making pictures like North by Northwest, instead of one like Psycho at the Palms Theater, will you, huh? So okay, Psycho gets some nervous laughter and a couple of yips of shock from the audience. But when even the great Hitchcock tries to make visual the dark side of star Anthony Perkin's psychopathic personality, the effect is ridiculous. Perhaps the get-up would be the only thing a young man in Perkins' state of mind could produce. All the same, it makes this phase of Hitch's horror movie look laughably corny". Glenn C. Pullen of the Cleveland Plain Dealer praised the performances of Leigh and Perkins, opening his review by writing that "if the movie theater business has any ills, according to 'Doctor' Alfred Hitchcock's diagnosis, they can be cured promptly by some blood-letting horrors, a healthy shot of mystery juice, and a chilling bath in bizarre melodrama. This whimsical prescription by the old master of suspense films again proved to be eminently correct in the case of his long-heralded Psycho". Francis Melrose of the Rocky Mountain News praised Leigh's and Perkins' performances and called the film "a shocker that hits you like a pile driver. You most likely will be stunned and reeling as you come out of the theater".

In the United Kingdom, the film broke attendance records at the London Plaza Cinema, but nearly all British film critics gave it poor reviews, questioning Hitchcock's taste and judgment and calling it his worst film ever. Reasons cited for this were the lack of preview screenings; the fact that they had to turn up at a set time as they would not be admitted after the film had started; their dislike of the gimmicky promotion; and Hitchcock's expatriate status. Alexander Walker of the London Evening Standard wrote that "Alfred Hitchcock may at any time try to frighten me to death, and welcome to him. But I draw the line at being bored to death. There were moments in Psycho when I thought he had almost succeeded. Quite an achievement, when you consider the stomach-turning contents of this nasty essay into horror by the master of suspense. Psycho is the grisly story of multiple murders at a lonely motel on the edge of Arizona swamp land. Hitchcock has laid the film out like a morbid morgue attendant. His eye for corpses has never been as wide open, nor his sense of bizarre death sharper. But what nauseates one is his sick relish of anything in it that is perverted or blood-spattered. And much is". Dick Richards of the Daily Mirror called it "a fairly ordinary, sometimes ridiculous melodrama".

Jack Bentley of the Sunday Mirror wrote that "Alfred Hitchcock, the 'master of suspense', has sadly underestimated the intelligence of his audience in presenting this gory story about a homicidal maniac. For his publicity department's entreaties to cinemagoers not to reveal the ending is totally unnecessary. I soon tumbled to it—and so will you. There are, however, excellent performances from Vera Miles, Janet Leigh and, in particular, Anthony Perkins". Ernest Betts of the Sunday People called it a "mad, morbid and monstrous film [in which] Hitchcock mixes old-fashioned hokum and the jargon of the psychiatrist to stretch your nerves to screaming point". In a scathing observation, Frank Lewis of the Sunday Dispatch told viewers to "ignore those pleas to keep the ending secret. Anyone above the mental age of 10 will know, only too well, what's coming".

A critic in The Daily Telegraph who only gave the initials of R.P.M.G. wrote that the film was "for this director, a disappointing murder melodrama with more absurdities than thrills. It is out of the ordinary only in that it is a little unpleasant. The most rewarding feature is Anthony Perkins' study of the murderer suffering as the title foretells from psychological disorders. Janet Leigh also gives a pleasing performance as the girl he kills with a knife while she is under a shower". A critic for the same newspaper, Patrick Gibbs, wrote that "it almost seems as if the director were pulling our legs and by way of improving the joke he leads us up the garden path—like Haydn in the 'Surprise Symphony'—with some serious completely realistic opening passages typically full of tension and suspense". C.A. Lejeune of The Observer wrote that "the stupid air of mystery and portent surrounding Psycho's presentation strikes me as a tremendous error. It makes the film automatically suspect". However, an unidentified critic in The Guardian, then based in Manchester, was somewhat more favorable in his reaction, saying that the film offered "no more than quite a good sample of the old Hitchcock style, rich in suspense, tension, and the rest of it; and it is also typical in being brilliant in patches and, as a whole, quite implausible".

Pauline Kael for The New Yorker wrote that it was one film that made her feel like it was "borderline immoral" because of what she saw as the "director's cheerful complicity with the killer, he had a sadistic glee" that she couldn't quite deal with.

Critics later reassessed the film in a far more positive matter in the coming months after release. Time magazine switched its opinion from "Hitchcock bears down too heavily in this one" to "superlative" and "masterly", and Bosley Crowther changed his initial opinion and included it in his Top Ten list of 1960, deeming it a "bold psychological mystery picture.... [I]t represented expert and sophisticated command of emotional development with cinematic techniques".

Psycho was criticized for inspiring other filmmakers to show gory content; three years later, Blood Feast, considered to be the first "splatter film", was released. Inspired by Psycho, Hammer Film Productions launched a series of mystery thrillers including The Nanny (1965) starring Bette Davis and William Castle's Homicidal (1961) was followed by a slew of more than thirteen other splatter films.

Modern reviews have been overwhelmingly positive. On the review aggregator website Rotten Tomatoes, Psycho has an approval rating of 97% based on 118 reviews, with an average score of 9.6/10. The site's critical consensus reads: "Infamous for its shower scene, but immortal for its contribution to the horror genre. Because Psycho was filmed with tact, grace, and art, Hitchcock didn't just create modern horror, he validated it". On Metacritic, the film has a weighted average score of 97 out of 100 based on 18 critics, indicating "universal acclaim". In his 1998 review of Psycho film critic Roger Ebert summarised the film's enduring appeal, writing:

What makes Psycho immortal, when so many films are already half-forgotten as we leave the theater, is that it connects directly with our fears: Our fears that we might impulsively commit a crime, our fears of the police, our fears of becoming the victim of a madman, and of course our fears of disappointing our mothers.

=== Box office ===
In its opening week, Psycho grossed $46,500 at the DeMille and a record $19,500 at the Baronet. Following its expansion the following week, it grossed $143,000 from 5 theaters. Psycho broke box-office records in Japan and the rest of Asia, France, Britain, South America, the United States, and Canada, and was a moderate success in Australia for a brief period.

It went on to become the second highest-grossing film of 1960, behind Spartacus, earning a box office gross of $32 million, which generated approximately $9.1 million in North American theatrical rentals. Psycho remains the most commercially successful film of Hitchcock's career. Hitchcock personally earned in excess of $15 million from Psycho. He then swapped his rights to Psycho and his TV anthology for 150,000 shares of MCA, making him the third largest shareholder in MCA Inc., and his own boss at Universal, in theory; this did not stop them from interfering with his later films.

== Accolades ==
Award	Category	Nominee(s)	Result	Ref.
Academy Awards	Best Director	Alfred Hitchcock	Nominated	
Academy Awards	Best Supporting Actress	Janet Leigh	Nominated	
Academy Awards	Best Art Direction – Black-and-White	Art Direction: Joseph Hurley and Robert Clatworthy; Set Decoration: George Milo	Nominated	
Academy Awards	Best Cinematography – Black-and-White	John L. Russell	Nominated	
Directors Guild of America Awards	Outstanding Directorial Achievement in Motion Pictures	Alfred Hitchcock	Nominated	
Edgar Allan Poe Awards	Best Motion Picture	Joseph Stefano (screenwriter) and Robert Bloch (author)	Won	
Golden Globe Awards	Best Supporting Actress – Motion Picture	Janet Leigh	Won	
National Film Preservation Board	National Film Registry		Inducted	
Satellite Awards (2005)	Best Classic DVD	Psycho (Part of the Alfred Hitchcock: The Masterpiece Collection)	Nominated	
Satellite Awards (2008)	Best Classic DVD	Psycho	Nominated	
Saturn Awards (2008)	Best Classic Film Release	Psycho (Universal Legacy Series)	Won	
Saturn Awards (2010)	Best Classic Film Release	Psycho (The 50th Anniversary Edition)	Nominated	
Saturn Awards (2012)	Best DVD or Blu-ray Collection	Psycho (Part of the Alfred Hitchcock: The Masterpiece Collection)	Nominated	
Writers Guild of America Awards	Best Written American Drama	Joseph Stefano	Nominated	

In 1992, the film was deemed "culturally, historically, or aesthetically significant" by the United States Library of Congress and was selected for preservation in the National Film Registry. In 1998, TV Guide ranked it No. 8 on their list of the 50 Greatest Movies on TV (and Video).

Psycho has appeared on a number of lists by websites, television channels, and magazines. The shower scene was featured as number four on the list of Bravo Network's 100 Scariest Movie Moments, while the finale was ranked number four on Premiere's similar list. In the British Film Institute's 2012 Sight & Sound polls of the greatest films ever made, Psycho was 35th among critics and 48th among directors.

In the earlier 2002 version of the list the film ranked 35th among critics and 19th among directors. In the 2022 edition of BFI's Greatest films of all time list the film ranked 31st in the critics poll and 46th in the director's poll. In 1998 Time Out conducted a reader's poll and Psycho was voted the 29th greatest film of all time. The Village Voice ranked Psycho at No. 19 in its Top 250 "Best Films of the Century" list in 1999, based on a poll of critics. The film was listed as one of TCM's top 15 most influential films of all-time list.

Entertainment Weekly voted it the 11th Greatest film of all time in 1999. In January 2002, the film was included on the list of the "Top 100 Essential Films of All Time" by the National Society of Film Critics. The film was included in Time's All-Time 100 best movies list in 2005. In 2005, Total Film magazine ranked Psycho as the 6th-greatest horror film of all time. In 2010, The Guardian newspaper ranked it as "the best horror film of all time". Director Martin Scorsese included Psycho in his list of the 11 scariest horror films of all time. The film was named as the third best horror movie of all time in a readers' poll by Rolling Stone magazine in 2014. In 2006, Writers Guild of America West ranked its screenplay 92nd in WGA's list of 101 Greatest Screenplays. In 2017 Empire magazine's reader's poll ranked Psycho at No. 53 on its list of The 100 Greatest Movies. In an earlier poll held by the same magazine in 2008, it was voted 45th on the list of "The 500 Greatest Movies of All Time". In 2021, the film was ranked at No. 5 by Time Out on their list of "The 100 best horror movies".

In 2012, the Motion Picture Editors Guild listed the film as the twelfth best-edited film of all time based on a survey of its membership. Psycho was ranked 8th in BBC's 2015 list of the 100 greatest American films. In 2022, Variety named Psycho the greatest movie of all time, and in 2024 as the third greatest horror film. In 2025, Entertainment Weekly ranked Psycho the best thriller movie of all time.

== Themes and style ==
=== Subversion of romance through irony ===
In Psycho, Hitchcock subverts the romantic elements that are seen in most of his work. The film is instead ironic as it presents "clarity and fulfillment" of romance. The past is central to the film; the main characters "struggle to understand and resolve destructive personal histories" and ultimately fail. Lesley Brill writes: "The inexorable forces of past sins and mistakes crush hopes for regeneration and present happiness". The crushed hope is highlighted by the death of the protagonist, Marion Crane, halfway through the film. Marion is like Persephone of Greek mythology, who is abducted temporarily from the world of the living. The myth does not sustain Marion, who dies hopelessly in her room at the Bates Motel. The room is wallpapered with floral prints like Persephone's flowers, but they are only "reflected in mirrors, as images of images—twice removed from reality". In the scene of Marion's death, Brill describes the transition from the bathroom drain to Marion's lifeless eye, "like the eye of the amorphous sea creature at the end of Fellini's La Dolce Vita, it marks the birth of death, an emblem of final hopelessness and corruption".

Marion is deprived of "the humble treasures of love, marriage, home and family", which Hitchcock considers elements of human happiness. There exists among Psycho's secondary characters a lack of "familial warmth and stability", which demonstrates the unlikelihood of domestic fantasies. The film contains ironic jokes about domesticity, such as when Sam writes a letter to Marion, agreeing to marry her, only after the audience sees her buried in the swamp. Sam and Marion's sister Lila, in investigating Marion's disappearance, develop an "increasingly connubial" relationship, a development that Marion is denied. Norman also suffers a similarly perverse definition of domesticity. He has "an infantile and divided personality" and lives in a mansion whose past occupies the present. Norman displays stuffed birds that are "frozen in time" and keeps childhood toys and stuffed animals in his room. He is hostile toward suggestions to move from the past, such as with Marion's suggestion to put his mother "someplace" and as a result kills Marion to preserve his past. Brill explains: "'Someplace' for Norman is where his delusions of love, home, and family are declared invalid and exposed".

Light and darkness feature prominently in Psycho. The first shot after the intertitle is the sunny landscape of Phoenix before the camera enters a dark hotel room where Sam and Marion appear as bright figures. Marion is almost immediately cast in darkness; she is preceded by her shadow as she reenters the office to steal money and as she enters her bedroom. When she flees Phoenix, darkness descends on her drive. The following sunny morning is punctured by a watchful police officer with black sunglasses, and she finally arrives at the Bates Motel in near darkness. Bright lights are also "the ironic equivalent of darkness" in the film, blinding instead of illuminating. Examples of brightness include the opening window shades in Sam and Marion's hotel room, vehicle headlights at night, the neon sign at the Bates Motel, "the glaring white" of the bathroom tiles where Marion dies, and the fruit cellar's exposed light bulb shining on the corpse of Norman's mother. Such bright lights typically characterize danger and violence in Hitchcock's films.

=== Motifs ===
The film often features shadows, mirrors, windows, and, less so, water. The shadows are present from the first scene where the blinds make bars on Marion and Sam as they peer out of the window. The stuffed birds' shadows loom over Marion as she eats, and Norman's mother is seen in only shadows until the end. More subtly, backlighting turns the rakes in the hardware store into talons above Lila's head.

Mirrors reflect Marion as she packs, her eyes as she checks the rear-view mirror, her face in the policeman's sunglasses, and her hands as she counts out the money in the car dealership's bathroom. A motel window serves as a mirror by reflecting Marion and Norman together. Hitchcock shoots through Marion's windshield and the telephone booth when Arbogast phones Sam and Lila. The heavy downpour can be seen as a foreshadowing of the shower, and its cessation can be seen as a symbol of Marion making up her mind to return to Phoenix.

There are a number of references to birds. Norman's hobby is stuffing birds. Marion's last name is Crane and she is from Phoenix. (In the novel, Norman's hobby is taxidermy but it is not focused on birds, and Marion is from Dallas, Texas.) Norman comments that she eats like a bird. The motel room has pictures of birds on the wall. Brigitte Peucker also suggests that Norman's hobby of stuffing birds literalizes the British slang expression for sex, "stuffing birds", bird being British slang for a desirable woman. Robert Allan suggests that Norman's mother is his original "stuffed bird", both in the sense of having preserved her body and the incestuous nature of Norman's emotional bond with her.

=== Psychoanalytic interpretation ===
Psycho has been called "the first psychoanalytical thriller". The sex and violence in the film were unlike anything previously seen in a mainstream film. French film critic Serge Kaganski wrote: "The shower scene is both feared and desired. Hitchcock may be scaring his female viewers out of their wits, but he is turning his male viewers into potential rapists because Janet Leigh has been turning men on ever since she appeared in her brassiere in the first scene".

In his documentary The Pervert's Guide to Cinema, Slavoj Žižek remarks that Norman Bates' mansion has three floors, paralleling the three levels of the human mind that are postulated by Freudian psychoanalysis: the top floor would be the superego, where Bates' mother lives; the ground floor is then Bates' ego, where he functions as an apparently normal human being; and the basement would be Bates' id. Žižek interprets Bates' moving his mother's corpse from top floor to basement as a symbol for the deep connection that psychoanalysis posits between superego and id.

Far Out Magazine named Perkins' role one of the "10 most accurate movie psychopaths according to the FBI".

== Legacy ==
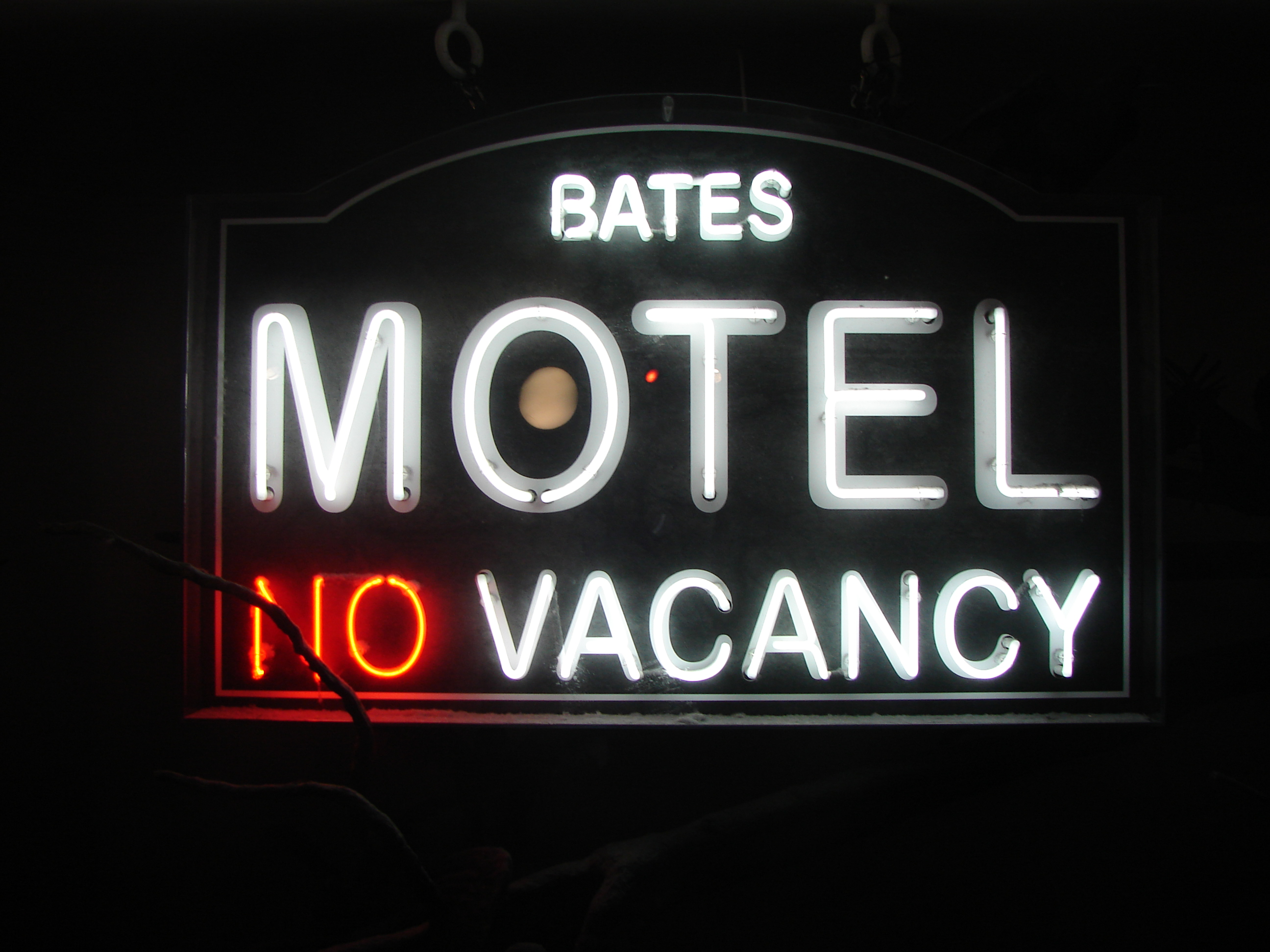
Sign at Madame Tussauds, London

Psycho has become one of the most recognizable films in cinema history, and is arguably Hitchcock's best known film. In his novel, Bloch used an uncommon plot structure: he repeatedly introduced sympathetic protagonists, then killed them off. This played on his reader's expectations of traditional plots, leaving them uncertain and anxious. Hitchcock recognized the effect this approach could have on audiences, and used it in his adaptation, killing off Leigh's character at the end of the first act. This daring plot device, coupled with the fact that the character was played by the biggest box-office name in the film, was a shocking turn of events in 1960. The shower scene has become a pop culture touchstone and is often regarded as one of the most iconic moments in cinematic history, as well as the most suspenseful scene ever filmed.

Psycho is considered by some to be the first film in the slasher film genre, though some critics and film historians point to Michael Powell's Peeping Tom, a lesser-known film with similar themes of voyeurism and sexualized violence, whose release preceded Psycho's by a few months.

In 2018, Zachary Paul of Bloody Disgusting said Psycho inspired subsequent horror films that had gender bender reveals, citing Terror Train (1980), Sleepaway Camp (1983), and the Insidious franchise (2011-) as examples. Paul criticized all these films for equating queerness with derangement but noted the makers of these films did not intend to offend anyone. Paul added "The days of gender reveals posing as a big twist come the third act of any mystery or hack n' slash flick are likely numbered. The trope has certainly had its day in the sun, and it's best we all move on".

Psycho has been referenced in other films numerous times: examples include the 1974 musical comedy horror film Phantom of the Paradise; the 1978 horror film Halloween (which starred Jamie Lee Curtis, Janet Leigh's daughter, and which featured a character named Sam Loomis); the 1977 Mel Brooks tribute to many of Hitchcock's thrillers, High Anxiety; the 1980 Fade to Black; the 1980 Dressed to Kill; and Wes Craven's 1996 horror satire Scream. Bernard Herrmann's opening theme has been sampled by rapper Busta Rhymes on his song "Gimme Some More" (1998). Manuel Muñoz's 2011 novel What You See in the Dark includes a sub-plot that fictionalizes elements of the filming of Psycho, referring to Hitchcock and Leigh only as "The Director" and "The Actress". In the comic book stories of Jonni Future, the house inherited by the title character is patterned after the Bates Motel. The film was played alongside The Shining at the drive-in theater as part of the Night of Horrors combo in the 1996 film Twister. In the 2003 animated film Finding Nemo, the Psycho theme song is played in reference to Dr. Sherman's niece Darla, whose pet fish are known to have died in her possession.

The film boosted Perkins' career, but he soon began to suffer from typecasting. When Perkins was asked whether he would have still taken the role knowing that he would be typecast afterwards, he said, "Yes". As Perkins was in New York working on a Broadway stage show when the shower sequence was filmed, actresses Anne Dore and Margo Epper stepped in as his body doubles for that scene. Until her death in 2004, Leigh received strange and sometimes threatening calls, letters, and even tapes detailing what the caller would like to do to Marion Crane. One letter was so "grotesque" that she passed it to the FBI. Two agents visited Leigh and told her the culprits had been located and that she should notify the FBI if she received any more letters of that type.

Leigh said: "No other murder mystery in the history of the movies has inspired such merchandising". A number of items emblazoned with Bates Motel, stills, lobby cards, and highly valuable posters are available for purchase. In 1992 Innovation Comics published a three-issue, shot-for-shot comics miniseries adaptation of the film. In 2010, Taylor Swift starred in a TV concert-documentary special that aired on NBC on Thanksgiving to promote her album Speak Now. In the special, Swift and her band perform her song "Haunted" at the Bates haunted house during Universal's Halloween Horror Nights. The film was mentioned and a trademark of its soundtrack was also used in Billy Joel's song "We Didn't Start the Fire".

=== Music ===
According to composer and producer Michael Vincent Waller, Herrmann's score for Psycho has had a broad cultural influence beyond film music. Waller notes that the score is "beloved by rap artists," citing Busta Rhymes' 1998 single "Gimme Some More", which samples music from the film. He suggests that Herrmann's use of "nihilistic fragments" and repetitive motifs anticipated techniques later used by hip-hop producers. Waller also states that Psycho influenced cinematic storytelling more broadly, particularly in the use of music to build tension, and had an impact on later composers such as John Williams in Jaws.

== Sequels and remake ==
Three sequels were produced after Hitchcock died: Psycho II (1983), Psycho III (1986), and Psycho IV: The Beginning (1990), the last being a part-prequel television movie written by the original screenplay author, Joseph Stefano. Anthony Perkins returned to his role of Norman Bates in all three sequels, and directed the third film. The voice of Norman Bates' mother was maintained by noted radio actress Virginia Gregg with the exception of Psycho IV, where the role was played by Olivia Hussey. Vera Miles also reprised her role of Lila Crane in Psycho II. The sequels received mixed reviews and were universally considered inferior to the original.

In 1998, Gus Van Sant made a nearly shot-for-shot remake (in color) starring Vince Vaughn, Julianne Moore, and Anne Heche. Van Sant said that his film was "a huge kind of experimental project", and that, though it did not do well commercially or critically, he may do it again, with more changes.

== See also ==
- Bates Motel (TV series) – 2013 American drama thriller television series
- False protagonist – Literary technique
- Hitchcock (film) – 2012 film by Sacha Gervasi
- List of American films of 1960
- List of cult films
- List of films featuring psychopaths and sociopaths
- Blood Feast – 1963 American independent splatter film by Herschell Gordon Lewis
- Monster: The Ed Gein Story – 2025 season of television series
