= Joseph Hurley (art director) =

American art director (1914–1982)

- Born: May 6, 1914
- Died: October 5, 1982 (aged 68); Los Angeles, California
- Occupation: Art director
- Years active: 1950-1982

Joseph Hurley (May 6, 1914 – October 5, 1982) was an American art director. He was nominated for an Academy Award in the category Best Art Direction for the film Psycho.

== Selected filmography ==
- Psycho (1960)
