= Deaths in March 2021 =

The following is a list of notable deaths in March 2021.

Entries for each day are listed alphabetically by surname. A typical entry lists information in the following sequence:

- Name, age, country of citizenship at birth, subsequent country of citizenship (if applicable), reason for notability, cause of death (if known), and reference.

== March 2021 ==
=== 1 ===
- Flex-Deon Blake, 58, American pornographic actor (Niggas' Revenge).
- Sir Alan Bowness, 93, British art historian and art critic, director of the Tate Gallery (1980–1988).
- Hauk Buen, 87, Norwegian fiddler.
- Frederico Campos, 93, Brazilian politician, governor of Mato Grosso (1979–1983), COVID-19.
- Ann Casey, 82, American professional wrestler (GCCW, JCP, WWWF).
- Gheorghe Dănilă, 71, Romanian actor.
- Ejaz Durrani, 85, Pakistani actor (Shaheed, Lakhon Mein Aik, Heer Ranjha).
- Víctor Espinoza Peña, 73, Peruvian politician, mayor of Pucusana District (since 2020), COVID-19.
- Emmanuel Félémou, 60, Guinean Roman Catholic prelate, bishop of Kankan (since 2007), COVID-19.
- Jahmil French, 29, Canadian actor (Degrassi: The Next Generation, Soundtrack, Remedy).
- Fernando Olivié González-Pumariega, 96, Spanish diplomat, ambassador to Paraguay (1970–1973), Colombia (1973–1977) and Yugoslavia (1977–1981).
- Bernard Guyot, 75, French Olympic racing cyclist (1964).
- Vladimír Heger, 89, Czech basketball player (ATK Praha) and coach (Sparta Praha, Czechoslovakia national team).
- Eleanor Jones, 91, American mathematician.
- Vernon Jordan, 85, American attorney, non-profit executive (National Urban League, UNCF) and civil rights leader.
- Kirinji Kazuharu, 67, Japanese sumo wrestler, multiple organ failure.
- Howard Klein, 89, American music critic and pianist.
- Boris Kosarev, 69, Belarusian ice hockey player (Traktor Chelyabinsk, HC Dinamo Minsk) and coach (Khimik-SKA Novopolotsk).
- Agim Krajka, 83, Albanian composer.
- Zlatko Kranjčar, 64, Croatian football player (Dinamo Zagreb, Rapid Wien) and manager (national team).
- Pietro Larizza, 85, Italian trade unionist and politician, secretary general of the UIL (1992–2000) and senator (2007–2008).
- Lyn Macdonald, 91, British radio producer and military historian.
- Stephen Maloney, 60, Australian tennis player.
- Theodoros Margellos, 68, Greek businessman.
- Jorge Marticorena Cuba, 64, Peruvian politician, mayor of Lurín District (2007–2014, since 2019), COVID-19.
- Mary McHenry, 88, American academic.
- Max Morton, 78, British-born Belgian painter.
- Andrea Nannini, 76, Italian Olympic volleyball player (1976).
- János Németh, 87, Hungarian jurist, president of the Constitutional Court (1998–2003).
- Rossella Panarese, 60, Italian radio broadcaster (Radio3 Scienza) and scientific divulgator.
- Ralph Peterson Jr., 58, American jazz drummer (The Jazz Messengers, Out of the Blue), cancer.
- Helena Pietraszkiewicz, 67, Polish politician and psychologist, voivode of Łódź (2006–2007).
- Enrique San Francisco, 65, Spanish actor (La mujer del ministro, Navajeros, El pico) and comedian, pneumonia.
- Milenko Savović, 60, Serbian basketball player (Partizan, Oximesa, Vojvodina), COVID-19.
- David Searle, 85, Canadian politician, Northwest Territories MLA (1967–1979) and speaker (1975–1979), cancer.
- Dick Sheppard, 90, British stuntman.
- Toko Shinoda, 107, Japanese painter.
- Ian St John, 82, Scottish Hall of Fame football player (Motherwell, Liverpool, national team) and manager.
- Mikhail Studenetsky, 86, Russian basketball player, Olympic silver medallist (1956), COVID-19.
- Lise Toubon, 87, French art expert.
- Ngai Tupa, 84, Cook Islands politician, MP (2006–2010).
- Anatoliy Zlenko, 82, Ukrainian diplomat, minister of foreign affairs (1990–1994, 2000–2003) and permanent representative to the United Nations (1994–1997).

=== 2 ===
- Czesław Baran, 83, Polish politician and agronomist, deputy (1985–1989).
- Chris Barber, 90, English jazz bandleader and trombonist ("Petite Fleur").
- George Bass, 88, American archaeologist, pioneer of underwater archaeology.
- Luciano Capicchioni, 74, Sammarinese-American sports agent.
- Àlex Casademunt, 39, Spanish pop singer (Operación Triunfo 2001), actor and TV presenter, traffic collision.
- Nandkumar Singh Chauhan, 68, Indian politician, MP (1996–2009, since 2014), COVID-19.
- Claudio Coccoluto, 58, Italian disc jockey.
- Werner Dörflinger, 80, German politician, MP (1980–1998).
- Mark Goffeney, 51, American guitarist, fentanyl overdose.
- Peter Grosser, 82, German football player (1860 Munich, national team) and manager (SpVgg Unterhaching).
- Michael Gudinski, 68, Australian music industry executive, co-founder of Mushroom Records, mixed drug use.
- Jim Hodder, 80, Canadian politician, Newfoundland and Labrador MHA (1975–1993, 2003–2007).
- Claude Lacroix, 77, French comic book author.
- Louise McBee, 96, American politician, member of the Georgia House of Representatives (1993–2005).
- Stan Newens, 91, British politician, MP (1964–1970, 1974–1983) and MEP (1984–1999).
- Kari Rasmussen, 88, Norwegian actress and singer.
- ChoKyun Rha, 87, Korean-born American biotechnologist.
- Danny Rogers, 78, American stuntman (Wish You Were Here, Titanic, Star Trek: First Contact).
- Gil Rogers, 87, American actor (All My Children, Guiding Light).
- Carlos Sánchez, 68, Argentine comedian, cancer.
- Prabhat Sarma, 85, Indian flutist and singer.
- Anna Shuttleworth, 93, English cellist.
- Henry Stollenwerck, 90, American politician.
- Jaroslav Tetiva, 89, Czech basketball player (1960 Olympics, Czechoslovakia national team).
- Bunny Wailer, 73, Jamaican reggae singer (Bob Marley and the Wailers) and songwriter ("Electric Boogie"), Grammy winner (1991, 1995, 1997), complications from a stroke.
- Edward C. Waller III, 95, American vice admiral.
- Ahmad al-Zein, 88, Lebanese Sunni Islam scholar.
- Zhou Yulin, 98, Chinese mathematician, member of the Chinese Academy of Sciences.

=== 3 ===
- Medea Abrahamyan, 88, Armenian cellist.
- Mavis Agbandje-McKenna, 57, Nigerian-born British biophysicist and virologist.
- Tomas Altamirano Duque, 87, Panamanian politician, vice president (1994–1999).
- Joe Altobelli, 88, American baseball manager (San Francisco Giants, Baltimore Orioles), player (Cleveland Indians) and coach.
- Celestino Bonifacio Bacalé, 63, Equatoguinean politician, deputy.
- Władysław Baka, 84, Polish economist and PZPR activist, president of the National Bank of Poland (1981–1985, 1989–1991), member of government (1985–1989).
- Hans Blumer, 92, Swiss Olympic swimmer (1948).
- Byun Hui-su, 23, South Korean soldier. (body discovered on this date)
- William P. Cartlidge, 78, English film producer (The Spy Who Loved Me, Moonraker, Consuming Passions).
- Marianne Carus, 92, American publisher, founder of Cricket.
- Sérgio Eduardo Castriani, 66, Brazilian Roman Catholic prelate, archbishop of Manaus (2012–2019), sepsis.
- Bill Collins, 89, British baker, co-developer of the Chorleywood bread process.
- Emmett Ripley Cox, 86, American jurist, judge of the U.S. District Court for Southern Alabama (1981–1988) and the U.S. Court of Appeals for the Eleventh Circuit (since 1988).
- Jim Crockett Jr., 76, American professional wrestling promoter (Jim Crockett Promotions), three-time president of the NWA, liver and kidney failure from COVID-19.
- Nicolás Curiel, 92, Venezuelan stage director and actor.
- Sadiq Daba, 69, Nigerian actor (October 1) and broadcaster (Nigerian Television Authority), cancer.
- Alan Davis, 82, English Anglican clergyman, Archdeacon of West Cumberland (1996–2004).
- Wilhelm Eliassen, 85, Norwegian footballer (Frigg Oslo FK, national team).
- István Fehér, 66, Hungarian Olympic wrestler (1980).
- Kelly Flynn, 66, American politician, member of the Montana House of Representatives (2011–2019), cancer.
- Katharina Gaus, 48, German-Australian immunologist.
- Diego Gómez, 84, Spanish radio journalist, COVID-19.
- József Gurovits, 92, Hungarian sprint canoer, Olympic bronze medallist (1952).
- Duffy Jackson, 67, American jazz drummer, complications from hip surgery.
- Pedro Jiménez Galán, 100, Spanish politician, deputy (1977–1979).
- Helena Kružíková, 92, Czech actress, Thalia Award recipient.
- Kyal Sin, 19, Burmese protester (2021–2022 Myanmar protests), shot.
- Jerzy Limon, 70, Polish literary scholar and writer, COVID-19.
- Katharina Matz, 85, Czech-born German actress (The Man Who Sold Himself, The Wonderful Years, Maximilian von Mexiko).
- Hideshi Miyake, 86, Japanese baseball player.
- Kenneth Arthur Myers, 86, Australian surgeon.
- Richard Olivier, 75, Belgian filmmaker and documentarian.
- Nicola Pagett, 75, British actress (Upstairs, Downstairs, Anne of the Thousand Days, There's a Girl in My Soup), brain tumour.
- Dagoberto Planos Despaigne, 64, Cuban singer, cirrhosis.
- Andrei Polyakov, 70, Russian diplomat, ambassador to Tunisia (2006–2011) and Rwanda (2013–2017).
- Earl Renneke, 92, American politician, member of the Minnesota Senate (1969–1993).
- Yuri Rozanov, 59, Russian sportscaster (NTV Plus, Match TV).
- John Sackett, 76, American politician, member of the Alaska House of Representatives (1967–1971) and Senate (1973–1987).
- Edward Sandoval, 74, American politician, member of the New Mexico House of Representatives (1983–2015), complications from COVID-19.
- Ruy Scarpino, 59, Brazilian football manager (Imperatriz, Ceará, Ituano), COVID-19.
- Donald J. Summers, 69, American particle physicist.
- Jonathan Temm, 58, New Zealand lawyer, president of the New Zealand Law Society (2010–2013), Queen's Counsel (since 2019).
- Eli Timoner, 92, American businessman, founder of Air Florida, assisted suicide.
- Guerdon Trueblood, 87, Costan Rican-born American screenwriter (Jaws 3-D, Sole Survivor, The Candy Snatchers).

=== 4 ===
- Kamal Amer, 78, Egyptian politician and military officer, governor of Matrouh (1997–1999) and Aswan (1999–2001), senator (2012–2013), COVID-19.
- William C. Andrews, 87, American politician.
- Joachim Brohmann, 76, German Olympic equestrian.
- Karima Brown, 54, South African radio broadcaster (Radio 702) and journalist, COVID-19.
- Alan Cartwright, 75, English rock bassist (Procol Harum), stomach cancer.
- Colby Chandler, 95, American executive, CEO of Kodak (1983–1990).
- Phil Chisnall, 78, English footballer (Manchester United, Liverpool, Southend United).
- Marcel Courthiade, 67, French linguist.
- DJ Adviser, Ghanaian disc jockey (Happy FM).
- Osman Erbaş, 58, Turkish military officer, helicopter crash.
- Barbara Ess, 73, American photographer and musician (Disband, Y Pants).
- Sarah Everard, 33, British marketing executive, strangled.
- Francis Van den Eynde, 74, Belgian politician, member of the Chamber of Representatives (1991–2000).
- Majid Fakhry, 97–98, Lebanese philosopher and academic.
- Sir Leslie Fielding, 88, British diplomat.
- Walter Gretzky, 82, Canadian ice hockey coach, complications from a hip injury.
- Paulette Guinchard-Kunstler, 71, French politician, deputy (1997–2001, 2002–2007), assisted suicide.
- Zygmunt Hanusik, 76, Polish Olympic cyclist (1968).
- Tony Hendra, 79, British comedian and actor (This Is Spinal Tap), complications from amyotrophic lateral sclerosis.
- Hossain Toufique Imam, 82, Bangladeshi political advisor, kidney disease.
- Tatsuo Itoh, 80, Japanese-born American electrical engineer.
- Hugh Newell Jacobsen, 91, American architect.
- Louis Jensen, 77, Danish writer.
- Atanasije Jevtić, 83, Serbian Orthodox hierarch, bishop of Zahumlje and Herzegovina (1992–1999), COVID-19.
- Johannes Kert, 61, Estonian politician and military officer, commander of the Estonian Defence Forces (1996–2000).
- Yuguda Hassan Kila, 70, Nigerian politician, member of the House of Representatives (since 2015).
- Donald Kinney, 63, Canadian politician, New Brunswick MLA (1999–2003), cancer.
- Heinz Klevenow Jr., 80, German actor (Entlassen auf Bewährung, Chingachgook, die große Schlange).
- Gerald Kogan, 87, American jurist, justice (1987–1998) and chief justice (1996–1998) of the Supreme Court of Florida.
- František Lízna, 79, Czech Jesuit priest, recipient of the Order of Tomáš Garrigue Masaryk, COVID-19.
- Moses McCormick, 39, American polyglot, heart disease.
- Paul McMullen, 49, American Olympic middle-distance runner (1996), skiing accident.
- Bhaskar Menon, 86, Indian-born American music industry executive, chairman and CEO of EMI Worldwide.
- Mark Pavelich, 63, American ice hockey player (New York Rangers), Olympic champion (1980), suicide by asphyxiation.
- Martin van de Pol, 56, Dutch criminal, shot.
- Andrew Porter, 75, British historian.
- Thomas A. Roach, 96, American politician.
- Colin Robinson, 58, Trinidadian activist and writer, colon cancer.
- David Schindler, 80, American-Canadian limnologist.
- Chris Schultz, 61, Canadian football player (Toronto Argonauts, Dallas Cowboys) and sportscaster (TSN), heart attack.
- Tengiz Sichinava, 48, Georgian football player (Dinamo Batumi, national team) and manager (Gagra).
- Jimmy Spratt, 69, Northern Irish politician, MLA (2007–2015).
- Jonathan Steinberg, 86, American-born British historian.
- Marat Tarasov, 90, Russian poet and translator.
- Willie Whigham, 81, Scottish footballer (Albion Rovers, Falkirk, Middlesbrough), pneumonia.
- Helmut Winschermann, 100, German classical oboist and composer.
- Azad Zaman, 47, Indian politician, Meghalaya MLA (since 2018), cardiac arrest.

=== 5 ===
- Joseph Ukel Abango, 82, South Sudanese politician.
- Michèle Angirany, 95, French Olympic cross country skier (1952).
- Robert Ashby, 95, American fighter pilot (Tuskegee Airmen).
- Étienne Flaubert Batangu Mpesa, 78, Congolese pharmacist and scientific researcher, pancreatic cancer.
- Jerzy Boniecki, 87, Polish Olympic swimmer (1952).
- Nicolas Bwakira, 79, Burundian diplomat.
- Chuang Ling-yun, 21, Taiwanese singer and actress, suicide by jumping.
- Buddy Colt, 85, American professional wrestler and pilot.
- Patrick Dupond, 61, French dancer (Paris Opera Ballet).
- Paul Foster, 89, American playwright, founding member of the La MaMa Experimental Theatre Club.
- Martin Freeth, 76, British filmmaker, cancer.
- Henri Gaudin, 87, French architect.
- Don Gile, 85, American baseball player (Boston Red Sox).
- Enrique González Rojo Jr., 92, Mexican writer and philosopher.
- Vilém Holáň, 82, Czech politician, minister of defense (1994–1996).
- Cecil Jacobson, 84, American gynecologist and convicted fraudster.
- Bandula Jayasekara, 60, Sri Lankan diplomat and journalist, blood cancer.
- Yevgeny Kadyaykin, 92, Kazakhstani Olympic middle-distance runner (1956).
- Frank J. Kelley, 96, American politician, attorney general of Michigan (1961–1999).
- Sasa Klaas, 27, Botswanan singer-songwriter, helicopter crash.
- Mickey Lewis, 56, English footballer (West Bromwich Albion, Derby County, Oxford United), cancer.
- Stig Malm, 79, Swedish trade unionist, chairman of LO (1983–1993), COVID-19.
- Margarita Maslennikova, 92, Russian cross-country skier, world champion (1954).
- David Matthews, 78–79, British academic and translator.
- Paolo Moreno, 86, Italian archaeologist.
- M. G. George Muthoot, 71, Indian conglomerate executive, chairman of The Muthoot Group (since 1993), fall.
- Gemma Narisma, 48, Filipina climate scientist, executive director of the Manila Observatory.
- Pavel Oliva, 97, Czech classical philologist and Holocaust survivor.
- Mo Pinel, 78, American mechanical engineer and product designer, complications from COVID-19.
- Billy Pritchett, 70, American football player (Cleveland Browns).
- Birgitta Rasmusson, 81, Swedish television personality and cookbook author.
- Ann Riordan, 73, Irish businesswoman.
- Janet Sawbridge, 73–74, British ice dancer.
- Gerda Schmidt-Panknin, 100, German painter.
- Samuel J. Scott, 82, American engineer.
- Harold S. Shapiro, 92, American mathematician.
- José Carlos da Silva Júnior, 94, Brazilian businessman and politician, senator (1996–1999) and vice-governor of Paraíba (1983–1986), COVID-19.
- Aulis Sipponen, 92, Finnish Olympic skier (1952).
- Francis Small, 75, New Zealand civil engineer and scouting leader, president of IPENZ (1996–1997).
- Michael Stanley, 72, American rock guitarist, singer and songwriter, lung cancer.
- Czesława Stopka, 83, Polish Olympic cross-country skier (1964).
- Suna Tanaltay, 87, Turkish poet and psychologist.
- Adelio Terraroli, 89, Italian politician, deputy (1968–1979).
- Carlo Tognoli, 82, Italian politician, mayor of Milan (1976–1986), deputy (1987–1994), MEP (1984–1987), COVID-19.
- Anton Urban, 87, Slovak football player (Slovan Bratislava, Wacker Innsbruck) and manager (Petržalka), Olympic silver medallist (1964).
- Gloria Werner, 80, American librarian.

=== 6 ===
- Bengt Åberg, 76, Swedish motocross racer.
- Franco Acosta, 25, Uruguayan footballer (Fénix, Villarreal B, Plaza Colonia), drowned.
- David Bailie, 83, South African-born English actor (Pirates of the Caribbean, The House That Jack Built, Doctor Who).
- Katja Behrens, 78, German author and translator.
- William Bell Jr., 90, American baseball player (Kansas City Monarchs).
- Joaquin Bernas, 88, Filipino Jesuit priest, lawyer and writer, member of the Constitutional Commission (1986) and president of the Ateneo de Manila University (1984–1993).
- N. S. Lakshminarayan Bhat, 84, Indian poet.
- Martin Boykan, 89, American composer.
- Chi Shangbin, 71, Chinese football player (national team) and manager (Dalian Wanda, Dalian Aerbin), heart attack.
- Ned Cleary, 90, Irish Gaelic football player (Castlehaven) and coach.
- Renée Doria, 100, French opera singer.
- Jude Patrick Dougherty, 90, American philosopher.
- Ben Farrales, 88, Filipino fashion designer.
- Yehia El-Gamal, Egyptian pediatrician and immunologist.
- Abdul Ghani Gilong, 88, Malaysian politician, MP (1969–1978), minister of works (1972–1974, 1976–1978) and transport (1970–1971).
- Sir Jeremiah Harman, 90, English jurist, cancer.
- Wilhelmina Holladay, 98, American art collector and patron.
- Cassius Ionescu-Tulcea, 97, Romanian-American mathematician.
- Boris Komnenić, 63, Serbian actor (Days of Dreams, Loving Glances, Seven and a Half).
- Todd R. Klaenhammer, 69, American food scientist and microbiologist.
- Konrad Kornek, 84, Polish footballer (Odra Opole, national team).
- Valentin Kurbatov, 81, Russian literary critic and writer.
- Orlando Lansdorf, 55, Dutch drag queen and HIV activist.
- M. Mahadevappa, 83, Indian agricultural scientist and plant breeder.
- Pierre Maraval, 84, French historian.
- Katsuaki Matsumoto, 92, Japanese racing cyclist, lymphoma.
- Allan J. McDonald, 83, American aerospace engineer, fall.
- Herbert Meneses, 81, Guatemalan actor (Sólo de noche vienes, The Silence of Neto).
- Miguel Miranda, 54, Peruvian football player (Sporting Cristal, Universitario, national team) and manager.
- Shrikant Moghe, 91, Indian actor (Sinhasan, Gammat Jammat).
- Tom Moloughney, 80, Irish hurler (Kilruane MacDonagh's, Tipperary).
- Pedro Novoa, 46, Peruvian writer and educator, colon cancer.
- Bill O'Connor, 94, American football player (Toronto Argonauts).
- Lou Ottens, 94, Dutch engineer (Philips), inventor of the cassette tape.
- Graham Pink, 91, English nurse and whistleblower.
- Carmel Quinn, 95, Irish-American actress and singer, pneumonia.
- Sawsan Rabie, 59, Egyptian actress, COVID-19.
- Nikki van der Zyl, 85, German voice-over artist (James Bond films), stroke.
- Egil A. Wyller, 95, Norwegian philosopher and historian.

=== 7 ===
- Mordechai Bar-On, 92, Israeli historian and politician, member of the Knesset (1984–1986).
- Dmitri Bashkirov, 89, Russian pianist.
- Wiesław Bocheński, 77, Polish Olympic freestyle wrestler (1968).
- Fabio Brunelli, 51, Brazilian news anchor, journalist and writer, cancer.
- Thaddeus M. Buczko, 95, American politician, Massachusetts state auditor (1964–1981).
- Joketani Cokanasiga, 84, Fijian politician, minister for public works and energy (2000–2001).
- Bob Curtis, 88, American politician, member of the Washington House of Representatives (1971–1977).
- Olivier Dassault, 69, French politician and aerospace executive, deputy (1988–1997, since 2002), helicopter crash.
- Paul Devlin, 74, Canadian curler.
- Andreana Družina, 101, Slovenian political commissar and partisan, People's Hero of Yugoslavia.
- Duggie Fields, 75, British artist.
- Stone Foltz, 20, American student and hazing victim, alcohol intoxication.
- Georges Gruillot, 89, French politician, senator (1988–2008).
- Janis Hape, 62, American Olympic swimmer (1976).
- Sanja Ilić, 69, Serbian composer ("Nova deca") and keyboardist (San, Balkanika), COVID-19.
- Gene Kennedy, 93, American politician, member of the Iowa House of Representatives (1969–1971) and Senate (1971–1975).
- Josky Kiambukuta, 72, Congolese singer (TPOK Jazz).
- John G. Lorber, 79, American general.
- Janice McLaughlin, 79, American Roman Catholic nun and human rights activist.
- Nwali Sylvester Ngwuta, 69, Nigerian jurist, justice of the Supreme Court (since 2011).
- Oishi Matashichi, 87, Japanese fisherman and anti-nuclear activist, pneumonia.
- Olga Orman, 77, Dutch-Aruban writer and poet.
- Mirko Pavinato, 86, Italian footballer (Bologna, Vicenza), kidney problems aggravated by COVID-19.
- Jerome K. Percus, 94, American physicist and mathematician.
- Lars-Göran Petrov, 49, Swedish heavy metal singer (Entombed, Entombed A.D., Firespawn), bile duct cancer.
- Maganti Ramji, 37, Indian film producer (Tuneega Tuneega), stroke.
- Yechezkel Roth, 85, Romanian-born American rabbi, heart attack.
- Charles Scontras, 91, American historian.
- Carl J. Shapiro, 108, American businessman and philanthropist, director of VF Corporation (1971–1976).
- Nikolay Smorchkov, 90, Russian actor (True Friends, The Cranes Are Flying, A Cruel Romance), COVID-19.
- Frank Thorne, 90, American comic book writer (Red Sonja).
- Albert Vallvé, 75, Spanish lawyer and politician, senator (1993–1996).
- Jack Welborn, 88, American politician, member of the Michigan House of Representatives (1973–1974) and Michigan Senate (1975–1982, 1985–1994).

=== 8 ===
- Risto Aaltonen, 81, Finnish actor (Leikkikalugangsteri, Crime and Punishment, Uuno Turhapuro muuttaa maalle).
- Josip Alebić, 74, Croatian Olympic sprinter (1972, 1976, 1980).
- Ronaldo Aquino, 59, Filipino politician, mayor of Calbayog (since 2011), shot.
- Kuryana Azis, 69, Indonesian politician, regent of Ogan Komering Ulu (since 2015), COVID-19.
- Clinton Ballou, 97, American biochemist and academic.
- Adrian Bărar, 61, Romanian guitarist and composer (Cargo), COVID-19.
- Robert Quincy Beard, 91, American politician.
- Joey Benjamin, 60, English cricketer (Warwickshire, Surrey, national team), heart attack.
- Tom Bland, 83, American football player (Wheeling Ironmen, Orlando Panthers, Toronto Argonauts).
- David M. Brink, 90, Australian-British nuclear physicist.
- Hervé Cassan, 74, French diplomat and professor.
- Cepillín, 75, Mexican clown, TV host and actor, complications from spinal surgery.
- Rhéal Cormier, 53, Canadian baseball player (St. Louis Cardinals, Boston Red Sox, Philadelphia Phillies), pancreatic cancer.
- Leon Gast, 85, American documentary filmmaker (When We Were Kings, The Grateful Dead Movie), Oscar winner (1997).
- Genésio Goulart, 66, Brazilian politician, Santa Catarina MLA (2003–2011) and mayor of Tubarão (1997–2000), degenerative disease.
- Keith Greene, 83, British racing driver (Formula One) and team owner, cardiac arrest.
- Norton Juster, 91, American author (The Phantom Tollbooth, The Dot and the Line, The Hello, Goodbye Window), complications from a stroke.
- Kind, 19, Irish racehorse, complications from foaling.
- Lee Ji-eun, 49, South Korean actress (Emperor of the Sea), heart attack.
- Catherine Macleod, 72, Scottish-born Canadian writer.
- Alan Marnoch, 75, Scottish-born Australian soccer player (Sydney Hakoah, Australia national team).
- Danny McAlinden, 73, Northern Irish boxer.
- Fergal McCann, 47, Irish Gaelic football coach (Tyrone).
- Terrence F. McVerry, 77, American politician and jurist, member of the Pennsylvania House of Representatives (1979–1990) and judge of the U.S. District Court for Western Pennsylvania (since 2002), complications from a fall.
- Stanislav Meleiko, 84, Russian television presenter and journalist.
- Djibril Tamsir Niane, 89, Guinean writer and historian, COVID-19.
- Rasim Öztekin, 62, Turkish actor (Düğün Dernek, For Love and Honor, G.O.R.A.), heart disease.
- Rafael Palmero Ramos, 84, Spanish Roman Catholic prelate, bishop of Palencia (1996–2006) and Orihuela-Alicante (2006–2012), complications from cancer and COVID-19.
- Trevor Peacock, 89, English actor (The Vicar of Dibley, Hamlet, Fred Claus), complications from dementia.
- Roman Pokora, 73, Ukrainian football player (Karpaty Lviv, Spartak Ivano-Frankivsk) and manager (Simurq PIK).
- Franca Polesello, 90, Italian actress (Il Sorpasso, Veneri al sole).
- Bill Searcey, 63, American football player (San Diego Chargers), pancreatic cancer.
- Norm Sherry, 89, American baseball player (Los Angeles Dodgers, New York Mets) and manager (California Angels).
- Anshuman Singh, 85, Indian politician and jurist, governor of Gujarat (1998–1999) and Rajasthan (1999–2003), COVID-19.
- Mark Whitecage, 83, American jazz reedist.
- Julien-François Zbinden, 103, Swiss composer and jazz pianist.

=== 9 ===
- Adnan Abdallat, 78, Jordanian neurologist, complications from COVID-19.
- Joan Walsh Anglund, 95, American children's author.
- Sergio Badiola, 90, Chilean Army general.
- Agustín Balbuena, 75, Argentine footballer (Colón de Santa Fe, Independiente).
- Pierre Baroni, 65, Australian radio broadcaster and musician, cancer.
- Boston Harbor, 26, American Thoroughbred racehorse.
- Micky Brown, 76, English footballer (Millwall, Colchester United).
- Margarita Darbinyan, 100, Armenian historian and translator.
- Richard Driehaus, 78, American fund manager and philanthropist.
- Federico Fabregat, 46, Mexican visual artist, writer and musician.
- Hans-Christian Gabrielsen, 53, Norwegian trade unionist, leader of the Norwegian Confederation of Trade Unions (since 2017), heart failure.
- Bob Graves, 78, English footballer (Lincoln City).
- Daniel Hillel, 90, Israeli-American agronomist.
- Rafet Husović, 56, Montenegrin politician, deputy prime minister (2012–2020).
- Jhon Jarrín, 59, Ecuadorian Olympic cyclist (1980), traffic collision.
- Walter LaFeber, 87, American historian.
- James Levine, 77, American conductor and pianist (Metropolitan Opera).
- Marino Lombardo, 70, Italian footballer (Torino, Cesena, Pistoiese), heart attack.
- Erling Lorentzen, 98, Norwegian shipowner and industrialist, founder of Aracruz Celulose.
- Carlos Matallanas, 39, Spanish sports journalist and writer, complications from amyotrophic lateral sclerosis.
- Biff McGuire, 94, American actor (The Thomas Crown Affair, Serpico, Gibbsville).
- Alec Monteath, 79, Scottish actor (Take the High Road).
- Roger Mudd, 93, American broadcast journalist (Meet the Press, NBC Nightly News), complications from kidney failure.
- Shuichi Murakami, 70, Japanese jazz drummer.
- Steve Ortmayer, 77, American football coach and executive (San Diego Chargers, Los Angeles Rams).
- Sir Richard Pease, 3rd Baronet, 98, British banker.
- John Polkinghorne, 90, English theoretical physicist, theologian and Anglican priest.
- Léo Rosa, 37, Brazilian actor (Vidas Opostas), testicular cancer.
- Adhemar Santillo, 81, Brazilian politician, deputy (1975–1986) and mayor of Anápolis (1986–1989, 1997–2001), pulmonary embolism from COVID-19.
- Cliff Simon, 58, South African-born American actor (Stargate SG-1), kiteboarding accident.
- Len Skeat, 84, English jazz double-bassist.
- Jim Snyder, 88, American baseball player (Minnesota Twins) and manager (Seattle Mariners).
- Steven Spurrier, 79, British wine merchant and writer.
- Josy Stoffel, 92, Luxembourgish Olympic gymnast (1948, 1952, 1956, 1960, 1964).
- René Taesch, 69, French photographer, musician and writer, cancer.
- Tommy Troelsen, 80, Danish footballer, Olympic silver medalist (1960) and television presenter.
- Blanquita Valenti, 87, American politician.
- Isela Vega, 81, Mexican actress (Bring Me the Head of Alfredo Garcia), screenwriter and film director, cancer.
- María de Jesús Velarde, 95, Spanish nun.
- Jiří Ventruba, 71, Czech neurosurgeon and politician, deputy (since 2017), COVID-19.
- Anthony Watson, 80, American Olympic long jumper (1960).
- Marina Zerova, 86, Ukrainian entomologist.

=== 10 ===
- Bruce Abel, 84, American bass singer.
- Thomas Ahearn, 91, Australian politician.
- Mirko Bazić, 82, Croatian football player (NK Metalac Zagreb, NK Nehaj) and manager (Dinamo Zagreb).
- Mario Boccalatte, 87, Italian footballer (Biellese, Reggiana).
- Hamed Bakayoko, 56, Ivorian politician, prime minister (since 2020), cancer.
- Joan Burt, 91, Canadian architect.
- Dharamchand Chordia, 71, Indian politician, Maharashtra MLA.
- Bob Desjarlais, 66, Canadian trade unionist.
- Dick Duckett, 87, American basketball player (Cincinnati Royals).
- Hélio Fernandes, 100, Brazilian journalist.
- Solomon Freelon, 70, American football player (Houston Oilers, Edmonton Eskimos).
- János Gonda, 89, Hungarian jazz pianist.
- Eugene Hughes, 86, American educator, president of Northern Arizona University and Wichita State University.
- Per Kleppe, 97, Norwegian politician, minister of trade and shipping (1971–1972), Nordic cooperation (1971–1972) and finance (1973–1979).
- Lee Chiong Giam, 79, Singaporean diplomat, high commissioner to Papua New Guinea (1982–1999) and Pakistan (2006–2014), ambassador to East Timor (2005–2014), complications from a fall.
- Richard Lind, 98, Malaysian civil servant.
- Lyudmila Lyadova, 95, Russian composer and singer, People's Artist of the RSFSR (1984), COVID-19.
- Henri-Thomas Lokondo, 65, Congolese politician, MP (since 2006), COVID-19.
- Chris Mann, 72, South African poet, cancer.
- Robert Middlekauff, 91, American historian, complications from a stroke.
- Ali Mahdi Muhammad, 82, Somali politician, president (1991–1997), COVID-19.
- Ron Phoenix, 91, English footballer (Manchester City, Rochdale).
- Scott Pilarz, 61, American Jesuit academic administrator, president of Marquette University (2011–2013) and the University of Scranton (2003–2011, since 2017), complications from amyotrophic lateral sclerosis.
- Albert Resis, 99, American historian and writer.
- Henryk Rozmiarek, 72, Polish handball player, Olympic bronze medalist (1976).
- Manuel Saturnino da Costa, 78, Bissau-Guinean politician, prime minister (1994–1997).
- Marco Sciaccaluga, 67, Italian theatre director.
- Stephen Scott, 76, American composer.
- Lani Stephenson, 72, American parasitologist and nutritionist.
- Joe Tait, 83, American sportscaster (Cleveland Cavaliers, Cleveland Indians, Cleveland Rockers).
- Veaceslav Țurcan, 55, Moldovan human rights activist, COVID-19.
- Tomás Vidiella, 83, Chilean film director and actor, complications from COVID-19.
- Robert-Rudolf Volk, 100, Estonian sculptor.
- David Wolfson, Baron Wolfson of Sunningdale, 85, British retail executive and politician, Downing Street chief of staff (1979–1985), member of the House of Lords (1991–2017), complications from dementia.

=== 11 ===
- Mauro Aparecido dos Santos, 66, Brazilian Roman Catholic prelate, archbishop of Cascavel (since 2007), COVID-19.
- Ray Campi, 86, American rock double bassist.
- Mahmud Us Samad Chowdhury, 66, Bangladeshi politician, MP (since 2014), COVID-19.
- Ted Collins, 78, Canadian football player (Ottawa Rough Riders, Winnipeg Blue Bombers, Montreal Alouettes).
- Carola B. Eisenberg, 103, Argentine-American psychiatrist.
- Jewlia Eisenberg, 50, American singer (Charming Hostess), GATA2 deficiency.
- Lin Emery, 94, American visual artist.
- Petar Fajfrić, 79, Serbian handball player and coach, Olympic champion (1972), COVID-19.
- Serge Giacchini, 89, French Olympic bobsledder (1956).
- Florentín Giménez, 95, Paraguayan pianist and composer, COVID-19.
- Sally Grossman, 81, American music label executive (Bearsville Records).
- Peter W. Hall, 72, American jurist, judge of the U.S. Court of Appeals for the Second Circuit (since 2004), cancer.
- Francis Hardy, 97, French politician, deputy (1973–1981, 1986–1988) and mayor of Cognac (1979–2001).
- Archie Lang, 72, Canadian politician, Yukon MLA (2002–2011), cancer.
- Victor Lebedev, 86, Russian composer (Heavenly Swallows, Be My Husband, Gardes-Marines, Ahead!), People's Artist of Russia (2005).
- Orlando Llenza, 90, Puerto Rican military officer.
- Curtis Lovejoy, 63, American swimmer, Paralympic champion (2000), blood cancer.
- Isidore Mankofsky, 89, American cinematographer (The Muppet Movie, Somewhere in Time, The Jazz Singer).
- Donald McDonnell, 87, Australian Olympic boxer (1952)
- Skip Mercier, 66, American set designer, pancreatic cancer.
- Takis Mousafiris, 84, Greek Aromanian composer and songwriter, cancer.
- Luis Palau, 86, Argentine-born American evangelist, lung cancer.
- Peter Patzak, 76, Austrian film director (Kassbach – Ein Porträt, Wahnfried, Shanghai 1937) and screenwriter.
- Ernesto Ráez Mendiola, 84, Peruvian stage director, actor and theater teacher.
- George Reihner, 65, American football player (Houston Oilers).
- Patrick Rieupeyrout, 69, French Olympic sailor.
- Jack Sandner, 79, American business executive (Chicago Mercantile Exchange), stroke.
- Jimmy Stevenson, 74, Scottish footballer (Hibernian, Southend United, Margate).
- Maenoyama Tarō, 76, Japanese sumo wrestler.
- Norman J. Warren, 78, English film director (Satan's Slave, Prey, Terror).
- Hirotaro Yamasaki, 79, Japanese politician, member of the House of Representatives (1993–1996) and mayor of Fukuoka (1998–2006), intracerebral hemorrhage.
- Zin Mar Oo, 51, Burmese actress (Sone Yay).

=== 12 ===
- Andrés Abt, 47, Uruguayan politician, deputy (2020), COVID-19.
- Austen Angell, 87, Australian-born American physical chemist, cancer.
- Robina Asti, 99, American flight instructor and advocate for women's and transgender rights.
- Gérard Aygoui, 84, French footballer (Olympique de Marseille, national team).
- Fatima Aziz, 47, Afghan physician and politician, MP (since 2005), cancer.
- Miodrag Baletić, 72, Montenegrin basketball coach (Sutjeska, Budućnost, Željezničar Sarajevo).
- Gaynor Cawley, 79, American politician, member of the Pennsylvania House of Representatives (1981–2006), cancer.
- Chao Kuang Piu, 100, Hong Kong textile executive and philanthropist, founder of Dragonair.
- Nicolae Dabija, 72, Moldovan writer, literary historian and politician, MP (1990–1994, 1998–2001), COVID-19.
- Ronald DeFeo Jr., 69, American mass murderer, basis for The Amityville Horror.
- Maximiliano Djerfy, 46, Argentine singer-songwriter and guitarist (Callejeros), myocardial infarctation.
- Richard Doviak, 87, American engineer.
- Ademar Frederico Duwe, 82, Brazilian politician, Santa Catarina MLA (1987–1991).
- Daphne Gail Fautin, 74, American professor of invertebrate zoology.
- Uruguay Graffigna, 73, Uruguayan-Chilean footballer (San Luis de Quillota, Los Angeles Aztecs, PEC Zwolle), complications from COVID-19 and Alzheimer's disease.
- Ferdi Hartzenberg, 85, South African politician, leader of the opposition (1993–1994), minister of education and training (1979–1982).
- Khairuddin Haseeb, 91, Iraqi journalist.
- David Kamhi, 84, Bosnian violinist and theologian.
- Chang Sik Kim, 77, South Korean-American Buddhist monk, creator of Shim Gum Do.
- Andrew Levine, 76, American political philosopher and commentator.
- Andrew Majda, 72, American mathematician.
- Noxolo Maqashalala, 44, South African actress. (body discovered on this date)
- Avenal McKinnon, 71, New Zealand art historian and writer, director of the New Zealand Portrait Gallery (2005–2014).
- Irina Medvedeva, 62, Russian scientist.
- John Albert Nordberg, 94, American jurist, judge of the U.S. District Court for Northern Illinois (since 1982).
- Dion Payton, 70, American blues guitarist and singer.
- Stahan Rakhimov, 83, Uzbek singer, People's Artist of Russia (2002).
- Daniell Revenaugh, 86, American pianist.
- Roei Sadan, 39, Israeli cyclist, traffic collision.
- Tapan Sarkar, 72, Indian-American electrical engineer and academic (Syracuse University).
- Ivo Trumbić, 85, Croatian water polo player, Olympic champion (1968) and coach (Netherlands national team).
- Bob Walkup, 84, American politician, mayor of Tucson (1999–2011), pulmonary fibrosis.
- Dwight Waller, 75, American basketball player (Atlanta Hawks).
- Zhou Youyuan, 82, Chinese astrophysicist, member of the Chinese Academy of Sciences.
- Goodwill Zwelithini, 72, South African royal, King of the Zulus (since 1971), complications from COVID-19.

=== 13 ===
- Rostyslav Bahdasarov, 27, Ukrainian footballer (Kolos Kovaliva, Stal Dniprodzerzhynsk), heart disease.
- Raoul Casadei, 83, Italian bandleader, composer and liscio musician, COVID-19.
- Josep Anton Codina Olivé, 88, Spanish theatre director.
- Igor Cornelissen, 85, Dutch journalist.
- Bob Davis, 93, American college basketball coach (Georgetown Tigers, Auburn Tigers).
- Jean-Claude Fasquelle, 90, French publisher.
- Silvio Favero, 54, Brazilian politician and lawyer, Mato Grosso MLA (since 2019), COVID-19.
- Daniela Figueredo, 19, Venezuelan inmate, shot.
- Giovanni Gastel, 65, Italian photographer, COVID-19.
- Marvelous Marvin Hagler, 66, American Hall of Fame boxer, undisputed middleweight champion (1980–1987).
- Sir David Hull, 88, British paediatrician.
- Martin Johnson, 71, English sports journalist (The Independent, The Daily Telegraph, The Sunday Times).
- Obren Joksimović, 68, Serbian politician, minister of health (2001), COVID-19.
- Mark Lubotsky, 89, Russian violinist.
- Roger Maes, 77, Belgian Olympic volleyball player (1968), COVID-19.
- Carole McCartney, 55–56, US-born Cypriot archeologist.
- Bob McPhee, 65, Canadian arts administrator, CEO of Calgary Opera (1998–2017), cancer.
- Stavros Moutaftsidis, 73, Greek Olympic hammer thrower.
- Menzi Ngubane, 56, South African actor (Generations, Yizo Yizo, How to Steal 2 Million), kidney disease.
- Kiyoko Ono, 85, Japanese gymnast and politician, Olympic bronze medallist (1964) and member of the House of Councillors (1986–2007), COVID-19.
- Nikola Spiridonov, 83, Bulgarian chess grandmaster.
- Rocky Thompson, 81, American professional golfer, complications from Alzheimer's disease.
- Erol Toy, 84, Turkish novelist.
- Murray Walker, 97, British motorsport commentator (BBC Sport, Channel 4, ITV Sport).
- Wang Fuchun, 77, Chinese photographer.
- Dave Watson, 79, American football player (Boston Patriots).

=== 14 ===
- H. Douglas Barclay, 88, American politician and diplomat, member of the New York State Senate (1965–1984), ambassador to El Salvador (2003–2006).
- Clark M. Blatteis, 88, German-American physiologist.
- Aurora Cornu, 89, Romanian-born French writer, film director and actress (Claire's Knee, Love in the Afternoon).
- Jean-Louis Coustillet, 78, French football player and coach (ES Viry-Châtillon, Troyes AC).
- Ray Cullen, 79, Canadian ice hockey player (Minnesota North Stars, Vancouver Canucks, Detroit Red Wings).
- Aurora Cornu, 90, Romanian writer and actress
- Henry Darrow, 87, American actor (The High Chaparral, The Hitcher, Zorro).
- Ted Daryll, 81, American songwriter.
- Frankie de la Cruz, 37, Dominican baseball player (Detroit Tigers, San Diego Padres, Milwaukee Brewers), heart attack.
- Lester Francel, 70, Colombian Olympic weightlifter (1972).
- Jean Frydman, 95, French resistance member.
- Helena Fuchsová, 55, Czech Olympic runner (1996, 2000), cancer.
- Māris Grīnblats, 66, Latvian politician, deputy (1991–2010) and minister of education (1995–1997).
- Michael Gunder, 67, New Zealand urban planner.
- S. P. Jananathan, 61, Indian film director (Iyarkai, Peraanmai, Laabam) and screenwriter, cardiac arrest.
- Khant Nyar Hein, 17, Burmese activist, shot.
- Mahmoud Khoshnam, 85, Iranian music critic.
- Iona McGregor, 92, Scottish author.
- Monty Meth, 95, British journalist (Daily Mail).
- Friedrich Meyer-Oertel, 84, German opera director.
- Laxman Pai, 95, Indian painter.
- Robert A. Pascal, 86, Canadian-American football player (Montreal Alouettes, Duke Blue Devils, Baltimore Colts) and politician, member of the Maryland Senate (1971–1974).
- Norman Pilcher, 85, British police officer and convicted perjurer, cancer.
- Paul Ri Moun-hi, 85, South Korean Roman Catholic prelate, archbishop of Daegu (1986–2007).
- Marvin Scott, 26, American inmate, homicide.
- Thione Seck, 66, Senegalese singer and musician (Orchestra Baobab, Raam Daan).
- Rusty Tillman, 75, American football player (Washington Redskins) and coach (Seattle Seahawks, Minnesota Vikings).
- Francesco Trabucco, 76, Italian architect and designer, five-time winner of the Compasso d'Oro, COVID-19.
- Coot Veal, 88, American baseball player (Detroit Tigers, Washington Senators, Pittsburgh Pirates), neuropathy.
- Jean-Jacques Viton, 87, French poet.
- Swain Wolfe, 82, American author.
- Suzanne Zimmerman, 95, American swimmer, Olympic silver medalist (1948).

=== 15 ===
- Michel Alberganti, 65, French radio producer and writer, cancer.
- Masahiro Anzai, 66, Japanese voice actor (Dragon Ball Z: Fusion Reborn), heart failure.
- Neil Ashcroft, 82, British-born American solid-state physicist.
- Desmond Barker, 71, South African Air Force officer, plane crash.
- Stephen Bechtel Jr., 95, American construction executive and civil engineer, co-owner of the Bechtel Corporation.
- Chai Kim Sen, 57, Malaysian politician, senator (2014–2020), cancer.
- Jim Dornan, 73, Northern Irish obstetrician and gynecologist, COVID-19.
- Dragoljub Đuričić, 68, Montenegrin drummer (YU Grupa, Leb i sol, Kerber), COVID-19.
- Daniel Eon, 81, French footballer (Nantes, national team).
- Les Fresholtz, 89, American sound mixer (All the President's Men, Bird, Lethal Weapon), Oscar winner (1977, 1989).
- Gilmar Fubá, 45, Brazilian footballer (Corinthians), bone marrow cancer.
- David Edwin Harrell, 91, American historian and biographer.
- Hendrik Hart, 85, Dutch-Canadian philosopher.
- Frances Degen Horowitz, 88, American developmental psychiatrist.
- Calvin Jackson, 48, American football player (Miami Dolphins, Birmingham Thunderbolts).
- Alan Kane, 75, Irish Gaelic footballer (St Joseph's, Aodh Ruadh, Donegal).
- Yaphet Kotto, 81, American actor (Live and Let Die, Alien, Homicide: Life on the Street).
- Gerard Alfons Kusz, 81, Polish Roman Catholic prelate, auxiliary bishop of Opole (1985–1992) and Gliwice (1992–2014).
- Anton Medan, 63, Indonesian gambling tycoon and Islamic preacher, stroke and diabetes.
- Chemancheri Kunhiraman Nair, 104, Indian Kathakali actor.
- Yasuo Ōtsuka, 89, Japanese animator (The White Snake Enchantress, Alakazam the Great, The Wonderful World of Puss 'n Boots).
- Doug Parkinson, 74, Australian pop and rock singer ("Dear Prudence", Fanny Adams, The Life Organisation).
- Chester Porter, 95, Australian barrister.
- Michel Rabreau, 83, French politician, deputy (1968–1978).
- Henri Rancoule, 88, French rugby union player (FC Lourdes, national team).
- Paloma Rodríguez, 64, Spanish politician, deputy (2012–2015).
- Yuri Shikunov, 81, Russian football player (Torpedo Taganrog, SKA Rostov-on-Don) and manager (Rostov).
- Barry Sinervo, 60, Canadian-born American behavioral ecologist and evolutionary biologist, cancer.
- Daniel Vachez, 74, French politician, deputy (1997–2002), mayor of Noisiel (1980–2017).
- Ian Waddell, 78, Scottish-born Canadian politician, MP (1979–1993), MLA (1996–2001).

=== 16 ===
- Moudud Ahmed, 80, Bangladeshi politician, prime minister (1988–1989), vice president (1989–1990) and MP (1979–1982, 1986–1996, 2001–2006).
- J. Bruce Amstutz, 92, American diplomat.
- Sergio Ballesio, 86, Italian Olympic field hockey player.
- Sir Courtney Blackman, 88, Barbadian economist and diplomat.
- Kevin Bradshaw, 63, Australian Olympic racing cyclist (1980).
- Emma C. Chappell, 80, American activist, founder of the United Bank of Philadelphia.
- Micky Dulin, 85, English footballer (Tottenham Hotspur).
- Amaranth Ehrenhalt, 93, American painter, sculptor and writer, COVID-19.
- Timur Faizutdinov, 19, Russian ice hockey player (HC Dinamo Saint Petersburg), cranial injury.
- Mauro Favilla, 87, Italian politician, senator (1987–1996) and mayor of Lucca (1972–1984, 1988, 2007–2012), COVID-19.
- Peter Freeman, 55, American musician, stomach cancer.
- Ombretta Fumagalli Carulli, 77, Italian politician, deputy (1987–1996) and senator (1996–2001).
- Aarón Gamal, 62, Mexican footballer (Deportivo Neza, Tigres, national team), heart disease.
- Líviusz Gyulai, 83, Romanian-born Hungarian graphic designer.
- Henry Kolowrat Jr., 87, Czech-born American Olympic fencer (1960).
- Rogers Lehew, 92, American football executive (Tulsa Golden Hurricane, Calgary Stampeders).
- Ahmed Mghirbi, 74, Tunisian footballer (Stade Tunisien).
- Allan Montgomery, 62, Australian footballer (Carlton).
- Erhan Önal, 63, Turkish footballer (Bayern Munich, Galatasaray, national team).
- Dwite Pedersen, 79, American politician, member of the Nebraska Legislature (1993–2008).
- Jeremy Phipps, 78, British Army officer.
- David Dias Pimentel, 79, Portuguese Roman Catholic prelate, bishop of São João da Boa Vista (2001–2016), COVID-19.
- Borys Rassykhin, 83, Ukrainian football player (Shakhtar Donetsk, Karpaty Lviv) and manager (Karpaty Lviv).
- Euclides Scalco, 88, Brazilian pharmacist and politician, deputy (1979–1991) and co-founder of the PSDB, COVID-19.
- Sabine Schmitz, 51, German motor racer (Münnich Motorsport) and television presenter (Top Gear), cancer.
- Turi Simeti, 91, Italian painter, COVID-19.
- Jimmy Stafford, 77, Irish Gaelic footballer (Cavan).
- Patrick Viot, 68, French footballer (US Orléans).
- Mary Wilburn, 89, American lawyer and government official.
- Philip C. Wolf, 64, American travel entrepreneur.
- Laurent Zahui, 60, Ivorian footballer (national team).

=== 17 ===
- Ed Armbrister, 72, Bahamian baseball player (Cincinnati Reds), complications from diabetes.
- Gerhard Augustin, 79, German music producer (Beat-Club), complications from a stroke.
- Xosé Ramón Barreiro, 84, Spanish historian, president of the Royal Galician Academy (2001–2009).
- Helenês Cândido, 86, Brazilian politician and lawyer, governor of Goiás (1998–1999), COVID-19.
- Jacques Frantz, 73, French actor (Asterix and the Vikings, Heartbreaker, Cop au Vin) and voice actor.
- Anton Gămurari, 70, Moldovan general (Transnistria War), COVID-19.
- Dilipkumar Gandhi, 69, Indian politician, MP (1999–2004, 2009–2019), COVID-19.
- Antón García Abril, 87, Spanish composer (Tombs of the Blind Dead, Pancho Villa, Return of the Blind Dead), COVID-19.
- Rym Ghezali, 38, Algerian actress (El Wa3ra), cancer.
- Jesús Gruber, 84, Venezuelan Olympic fencer.
- Kristian Gullichsen, 88, Finnish architect.
- Steve Jagielka, 43, English footballer (Shrewsbury Town, Accrington Stanley, Sheffield United).
- Amy Johnston, 66, American actress (The Buddy Holly Story, Welcome Back, Kotter, Brothers and Sisters) and drama coach, cancer.
- John Magufuli, 61, Tanzanian politician, president (since 2015), minister of works, transports and communications (2000–2005, 2010–2015) and MP (1995–2015).
- Freddie Redd, 92, American pianist and composer (The Connection).
- Sonny Roberts, 89, Jamaican record producer, throat cancer.
- Vicente Rojo Almazán, 89, Spanish-born Mexican painter, graphic designer and sculptor.
- Ulisses dos Santos, 91, Brazilian Olympic hurdler (1956), COVID-19.
- Ram Swaroop Sharma, 62, Indian politician, MP (since 2014), suicide by hanging.
- Ian Shelton, 81, Australian footballer (Essendon).
- James Smith, 89, American Olympic sport shooter (1956).
- Gyula Szersén, 80, Hungarian actor (The Round-Up).

=== 18 ===
- Zeev Aram, 89, Romanian-born British furniture designer.
- Chester Barnes, 74, English table tennis player and assistant racehorse trainer, heart attack.
- Luis Bedoya Reyes, 102, Peruvian politician, mayor of Lima (1964–1969), member of the Constituent Assembly (1978–1980) and minister of justice (1963).
- Michael Boardman, 83, English mathematician.
- Mark Boguski, 66, American pathologist.
- David Braithwaite, 83, New Zealand politician, mayor of Hamilton (2001–2004).
- Donald L. Custis, 103, American Navy vice admiral.
- Hermann Flaschka, 75, Austrian-American mathematical physicist.
- Mehmet Genç, 86, Turkish historian and academic.
- Richard Gilliland, 71, American actor (Designing Women, Operation Petticoat, Airplane II: The Sequel).
- Herzem Gusmão Pereira, 72, Brazilian politician and journalist, mayor of Vitória da Conquista (since 2017) and Bahia MLA (2015–2016), COVID-19.
- Steve Henry, 64, American football player (St. Louis Cardinals, New York Giants, Baltimore Colts), traffic collision.
- Bertrand Hourcade, 70, Swiss writer and professor.
- Paul Jackson, 73, American jazz bassist (The Headhunters, Azteca, Santana).
- Edward Nager, 93, American politician, member of the Wisconsin State Assembly (1962–1974).
- Major Olímpio, 58, Brazilian politician, senator (since 2019), deputy (2015–2019) and São Paulo MLA (2007–2015), COVID-19.
- Elsa Peretti, 80, Italian jewelry designer, philanthropist, and fashion model.
- Picanyol, 73, Spanish comic illustrator (Ot el bruixot).
- Jerzy Prokopiuk, 89, Polish philosopher, COVID-19.
- Jean-Michel Sanejouand, 86, French artist.
- Michael Stolleis, 79, German jurist and historian, director of the Max Planck Society (1991–2009).
- Wayne Kent Taylor, 65, American restaurateur, founder and CEO of Texas Roadhouse, suicide.
- Skariah Thomas, 77, Indian politician, MP (1977–1984), complications from COVID-19.
- John Vincent, 83, British historian.
- DeWitt Weaver, 81, American golfer, heart failure.
- Bill Young, 74, American football player and coach (Oklahoma State Cowboys).

=== 19 ===
- Muhammad Ali al-Sabuni, 91, Syrian Islamic scholar.
- Luis Armando Bambarén Gastelumendi, 93, Peruvian Roman Catholic prelate, auxiliary bishop of Lima (1968–1978), bishop of Chimbote (1983–2003) and president of the Episcopal Conference of Peru (1999–2002), COVID-19.
- Toby Prince Brigham, 86, American lawyer and eminent domain scholar.
- Thomas Cavalier-Smith, 78, English biologist.
- Paul Coffin, 78–79, Canadian businessman and convicted fraudster.
- Jordi Cornet, 55, Spanish politician, member of the Catalan Parliament (2010–2012) and Barcelona City Council (1995–2010), cancer.
- Cristián Cuturrufo, 48, Chilean jazz trumpeter, COVID-19.
- Aurelio Desdentado, 76, Spanish judge, member of the Supreme Court (1986–2014), COVID-19.
- Margie Evans, 81, American blues and gospel singer and songwriter.
- Diana Grenfell, 85, English horticulturist and author.
- Andy Haman, 54, American bodybuilder, pulmonary embolism.
- Ludwig Heimrath Sr., 86, Canadian racing driver, pancreatic cancer.
- Bernard Hugo, 90, French politician, senator (1977–1986), mayor of Trappes (1966–1996).
- Henry Wanton Jones, 95, Canadian painter.
- Ali Khavari, 97, Iranian politician.
- Leonard Kniffel, 73, American librarian, pancreatic cancer.
- Melvin L. Kohn, 92, American sociologist.
- Irmão Lázaro, 54, Brazilian gospel singer and politician, deputy (2015–2019), COVID-19.
- Gary Leib, 65, American cartoonist (Idiotland) and musician (Rubber Rodeo).
- Glynn Lunney, 84, American aerospace engineer (Project Mercury, Project Gemini, Apollo program).
- Gabriel Milési, 73, French writer and journalist.
- Adel Nassief, 58, Egyptian Coptic painter, COVID-19.
- Barry Orton, 62, American professional wrestler (WWF, ICW, Stampede Wrestling).
- Leonard Sinclair Sparks, 81, Canadian boxer.
- Alvin Sykes, 64, American civil rights activist, complications from a spinal injury.
- Doug Williams, 75, American anti-polygraph activist.
- Budge Wilson, 93, Canadian writer (Before Green Gables, The Metaphor), complications from a fall.

=== 20 ===
- Rita Deanin Abbey, 90, American abstract artist.
- Fidelis Atienza, 102, Filipino nun and confectioner.
- Kermit Edward Bye, 84, American jurist, judge of the U.S. Court of Appeals for the Eighth Circuit (2000–2016), complications from Alzheimer's disease.
- Biagio Ciotto, 91, American politician, member of the Connecticut State Senate (1995–2007).
- Lawrence F. Dahl, 91, American chemist.
- Albert Joe Demby, 87, Sierra Leonean politician, vice president (1996–1997, 1998–1999, 2000–2002).
- Constance Demby, 81, American composer, heart attack.
- Buddy Deppenschmidt, 85, American jazz drummer, complications from COVID-19.
- Taryn Fiebig, 49, Australian operatic soprano, cancer.
- Anton Font, 89, Spanish mime and educator.
- Glenn T. Freeman, 91, American politician.
- Robert Gard, 93, British-born Australian tenor.
- Harry Guest, 88, Welsh-born British poet.
- Else Hammerich, 84, Danish politician, MEP (1979–1989), cancer.
- Robert Hershon, 84, American poet.
- Milan Hurtala, 74, Slovak Olympic rower (1968), COVID-19.
- Mohamed Ismaïl, 69, Moroccan film director (Goodbye Mothers).
- Rito Jiménez, 70, Venezuelan politician, deputy (since 2020), COVID-19.
- Bernal Jiménez Monge, 91, Costa Rican politician, member (1982–1986, 2002–2006) and president (1984–1985) of the Legislative Assembly, minister of economy and finance (1964–1965).
- Fred Jones, 78, Australian rugby league player (Manly Warringah, New South Wales, national team).
- Vladimir Kirsanov, 73, Russian choreographer and dancer, Merited Artist of the Russian Federation (1995), COVID-19.
- C. A. Kurian, 88, Indian politician, Kerala MLA (1977–1982, 1996–2001).
- Richard Lingenfelter, 86, American astrophysicist and historian.
- Peter Lorimer, 74, Scottish footballer (Leeds United, national team).
- Richard Mendani, 53, Papua New Guinean politician, MP (since 2012), COVID-19.
- Chris Nam, 66, South Korean realtor and community leader, liver cancer.
- Yevgeny Nesterenko, 83, Russian operatic singer, COVID-19.
- François Nicoullaud, 80, French diplomat and political analyst, ambassador to Hungary (1993–1997) and Iran (2001–2005).
- Jack Phelan, 95, American basketball player.
- Dan Sartain, 39, American rock and roll musician.
- Jeffrey Scuffins, 58, American runner.
- Nguyễn Huy Thiệp, 70, Vietnamese writer, complications from a stroke.
- Raúl G. Villaronga, 82, American politician, mayor of Killeen, Texas (1992–1998).
- Bruce Wilson, 78, Australian Anglican bishop, Bishop of Bathurst (1989–2001), cardiac illness.
- Dale E. Wolf, 96, American politician, lieutenant governor (1989–1992) and governor of Delaware (1992–1993).
- Fred Wyant, 86, American football player (Washington Redskins, Toronto Argonauts) and official.

=== 21 ===
- Akio Arakawa, 93, Japanese-born American climatologist.
- José Baselga, 61, Spanish medical oncologist and researcher, Creutzfeldt–Jakob disease.
- Gilbert Blardone, 96, French economist and academic.
- Pat Collins, 88, American lighting designer (Ain't Misbehavin', I'm Not Rappaport, Dr. Seuss' How the Grinch Stole Christmas! The Musical), Tony winner (1986), pancreatic cancer.
- Nawal El Saadawi, 89, Egyptian feminist and writer (Woman at Point Zero, The Fall of the Imam).
- Dick Enthoven, 84, Dutch racing cyclist.
- Brian Faehse, 96, Australian footballer (West Adelaide).
- Jeff Grayshon, 72, English rugby league footballer (Dewsbury, Bradford Northern, Featherstone).
- Herbert Gutfreund, 99, British biochemist.
- June Halliday, 90-91, Australian biochemist.
- Barbara Hosking, 94, British broadcaster and civil servant.
- James W. Hunt, 68, American computer scientist and inventor (Hunt–Szymanski algorithm).
- Trisutji Kamal, 84, Indonesian composer.
- Teresa Lozano Long, 92, American educator and philanthropist.
- Christian Maes, 73, Belgian Olympic sailor (1968).
- Sharon Matola, 66, American biologist and environmentalist, founder of the Belize Zoo, heart attack.
- Bob McKnight, 83, Canadian ice hockey player, Olympic silver medallist (1960).
- Terry Melling, 81, English footballer (Slough Town, Newcastle United, Mansfield Town).
- Honoré Ngbanda, 74, Congolese politician, minister of defense (1990–1997).
- Sir Stanley Odell, 91, British businessman and politician.
- Muchtar Pakpahan, 67, Indonesian lawyer and labor activist.
- Aris Poulianos, 96, Greek anthropologist and archaeologist.
- Harold Sharp, 93, American judoka and author.
- Jeffrey G. Smith, 99, American lieutenant general.
- Suraj Bhanu Solanki, 60, Indian politician, MP (1989–1996), heart attack.
- Joel Steiger, 79, American television producer and writer (Perry Mason, Matlock, Jake and the Fatman).
- Karin Strenz, 53, German politician, MP (since 2009).
- Nicholas Cunliffe-Lister, 3rd Earl of Swinton, 81, British peer.
- Xudoyberdi Toʻxtaboyev, 88, Uzbek children's author.
- Shahied Wagid Hosain, 59, Surinamese singer.
- Adam Zagajewski, 75, Polish poet (Unseen Hand, Another Beauty).

=== 22 ===
- Henrique do Rego Almeida, 84, Brazilian politician, senator (1991–1999), COVID-19.
- Luis Arencibia, 74, Spanish sculptor, cancer.
- Elgin Baylor, 86, American Hall of Fame basketball player (Minneapolis/Los Angeles Lakers), coach (New Orleans Jazz) and executive (Los Angeles Clippers).
- Dušan Čamprag, 96, Serbian entomologist.
- Susana Canales, 87, Spanish actress (Black Sky, Such is Madrid, John Paul Jones).
- John Crichton-Stuart, 7th Marquess of Bute, 62, Scottish racing driver (Formula One, 24 Hours of Le Mans) and peer, cancer.
- Joseph Daaboul, 62, Lebanese poet and proofreader, complications from COVID-19.
- Zuhur Dixon, 88, Iraqi poet.
- Claudio Donoso, Chilean forester and academic.
- Theepetti Ganesan, 30, Indian actor (Renigunta, Kadhal Paathai, Mandya to Mumbai).
- Juan Carlos Gómez, 88, Argentine Olympic rower.
- Pierick Houdy, 92, French composer and musician.
- Floyd Hudlow, 77, American football player (Atlanta Falcons, Buffalo Bills).
- Barnabas Imenger, 45, Nigerian footballer (Lobi Stars, national team).
- Lorna Irungu, 47, Kenyan television presenter and media relations executive, COVID-19.
- Ted Itani, 81, Canadian military officer and humanitarian, complications from injuries sustained in traffic collision.
- Swede Knox, 73, Canadian NHL ice hockey linesman, cancer.
- Guy Brice Parfait Kolélas, 61, Congolese politician, deputy (since 2007), COVID-19.
- Heino Kostabi, 87, Estonian politician.
- Melissa Kremer, 25, Dutch writer, leukemia.
- James Leary, 74, American double bass player.
- Tatyana Lolova, 87, Bulgarian actress (Man of La Mancha, Indian Summer, Opasen char), complications from COVID-19.
- Alojzy Łysko, 85, Polish football player and coach.
- Tom Magee, 92, Australian footballer (Fitzroy, Melbourne).
- P. J. McGrath, 79, Irish Gaelic football player (Mayo) and referee.
- Paule Moris, 88, French Olympic alpine skier.
- Sante Notarnicola, 82, Italian poet and convicted robber and murderer, complications from influenza.
- Peng Shilu, 95, Chinese nuclear engineer (Type 091, Type 092), member of the Chinese Academy of Engineering.
- Sagar Sarhadi, 87, Indian screenwriter (Kabhi Kabhie, Noorie, Silsila) and film producer, heart disease.
- Alan Slough, 73, English footballer (Luton Town, Fulham, Peterborough United).
- Tapeta Tetopata, 67, French Polynesian politician, member of the Assembly (since 2018).
- Kotugoda Dhammawasa Mahanayaka Thero, 88, Sri Lankan Buddhist monk, Mahanayaka of Amarapura–Rāmañña Nikāya (since 2017).
- James M. Wall, 92, American Methodist minister.
- Ryszard Wasik, 89, Polish politician, master mariner and diplomat, deputy (1972–1976).
- Frank Worthington, 72, English footballer (Huddersfield Town, Leicester City, national team).
- May Wynn, 93, American actress (The Caine Mutiny).

=== 23 ===
- Gurnam Singh Abulkhurana, 89, Indian politician, Punjab MLA (1992–1997).
- Mohammad Anwar, 66, American driver, murdered.
- Basrief Arief, 74, Indonesian prosecutor, attorney general (2010–2014).
- Noel Bridgeman, 74, Irish musician.
- Corinne Chapelle, 44, French-American violinist, cancer.
- Alberto Ciurana, 60, Mexican television producer (Televisa, TV Azteca), COVID-19.
- Cockney Rebel, 17, Irish thoroughbred racehorse and sire.
- Benny Dees, 86, American college basketball coach (Wyoming Cowboys, New Orleans Privateers, Western Carolina Catamounts).
- Jehan Desanges, 91, French historian and philologist.
- Sam Frazier Jr., 77, American blues musician.
- Ethel Gabriel, 99, American record producer (RCA Victor) and music executive, Grammy winner (1982).
- William A. Gamson, 87, American sociologist.
- Edmund Gettier, 93, American philosopher, complications from a fall.
- Tony Greaves, Baron Greaves, 78, British politician and peer, member of the House of Lords (since 2000).
- Bashir Ahmed Halepoto, Pakistani politician, Sindh MPA (2013–2018).
- Hana Hegerová, 89, Slovak singer and actress (Frona, If a Thousand Clarinets, Shameless), complications from a broken neck.
- Mark Jansen, 61, American politician, member of the Michigan House of Representatives (1997–2002) and Senate (2007–2014), brain cancer.
- A. Mohammed John, 72, Indian politician, MP (since 2016) and Tamil Nadu MLA (2011–2014), cardiac arrest.
- Anne Kerylen, 77, French dubber and actress (I Am Frigid... Why?).
- Bob Lewis, 76, American amateur golfer, lung cancer.
- Enrique Martínez, 90, Spanish Olympic equestrian (1960, 1964, 1972).
- Yevgeny Morozov, 92, Russian Olympic rower (1952).
- Jesús Gervasio Pérez Rodríguez, 84, Spanish-born Bolivian Roman Catholic prelate, archbishop of Sucre (1985–2021).
- Metod Pirih, 84, Slovenian Roman Catholic prelate, bishop of Koper (1987–2012).
- Julie Pomagalski, 40, French Olympic snowboarder (2002, 2006), world champion (1999), avalanche.
- Reg Poole, 79, Australian footballer (Hawthorn).
- John Ridpath, 84, Canadian intellectual historian.
- Gilles Rossignol, 78, French writer and editor.
- George Segal, 87, American actor (Who's Afraid of Virginia Woolf?, The Goldbergs, A Touch of Class), complications from bypass surgery.
- Hans Standl, 95, German Olympic sports shooter (1968).
- Erik Thorsby, 82, Norwegian physician.
- Houston Tumlin, 28, American child actor (Talladega Nights: The Ballad of Ricky Bobby), suicide by gunshot.
- Alhaj Shamim Uddin, 90, Pakistani politician, Sindh MPA (1985–1988).
- Joe Vancisin, 98, American basketball coach and executive.
- Irena Vrkljan, 90, Croatian writer and translator.
- Granville Waiters, 60, American basketball player (Indiana Pacers, Houston Rockets, Chicago Bulls).

=== 24 ===
- Alex Andjelic, 80, Serbian Olympic ice hockey player (1964) and coach, complications from COVID-19.
- Jean Baudlot, 74, French composer.
- Uldis Bērziņš, 76, Latvian poet and translator.
- Aécio de Borba, 89, Brazilian politician, deputy (1983–1995, 1997–1998) and member of the Constituent Assembly (1987–1988), cardiac arrest.
- Enrique Chazarreta, 73, Argentine footballer (San Lorenzo, Avignon, national team).
- Edward B. Cottingham, 92, American judge and politician, member of the South Carolina House of Representatives (1955–1958, 1967–1972).
- Morris Dickstein, 81, American literary scholar, complications from Parkinson's disease.
- Jesús Fernández Vaquero, 67, Spanish politician, president (2015–2019) and member of the Cortes of Castilla–La Mancha (1999–2019), senator (since 2019).
- Finian's Rainbow, 18, British racehorse.
- Craig Grant, 52, American actor (Oz, She's Gotta Have It, Good Time) and poet, complications from diabetes.
- Derek Hawksworth, 93, English footballer (Bradford City, Sheffield United, Huddersfield Town).
- Don Heffington, 70, American drummer (Lone Justice, Watkins Family Hour), leukemia.
- Rudolf Kelterborn, 89, Swiss composer (Der Kirschgarten).
- Norm Kirby, 95, Canadian soldier (World War II).
- Toshihiko Koga, 53, Japanese judoka, Olympic champion (1992).
- Anna Koźmińska, 101, Polish recipient of Righteous Among the Nations award.
- Kentaro Kudo, 78, Japanese politician, member of the House of Councillors (2004–2010) and House of Representatives (1993–1996, 2000–2003), respiratory failure.
- Camille Liénard, 86, Belgian Olympic bobsledder (1964).
- Haroldo Lima, 81, Brazilian politician and anti-dictatorship activist, general director of the ANP (2005–2011) and deputy (1983–2003), COVID-19.
- Kåre Arnstein Lye, 81, Norwegian botanist and field biologist.
- Hanna Lypkivska, 53, Ukrainian theatrologist, COVID-19.
- Hamdan bin Rashid Al Maktoum, 75, Emirati politician and horse breeder (Shadwell Racing), deputy prime minister (1971–1973).
- Tony Martin, 83, American painter and sculptor, congestive heart failure.
- Jorge Martínez Reverte, 72, Spanish writer, journalist and historian, cancer.
- Pedro Saúl Morales, 61, Colombian racing cyclist, heart attack.
- Ezra T. Newman, 91, American physicist.
- Bob Plager, 78, Canadian ice hockey player (St. Louis Blues, New York Rangers), traffic collision.
- Zora Plešnar, 95, Slovenian photographer.
- Richard Stoker, 82, British composer and actor.
- Tamás Sudár, 79, Hungarian Olympic ski jumper (1960).
- Kunie Tanaka, 88, Japanese actor (The Bad Sleep Well, Sanjuro, Battles Without Honor and Humanity).
- Vlasta Velisavljević, 94, Serbian actor, COVID-19.
- Jessica Walter, 80, American actress (Arrested Development, Archer, Play Misty for Me), Emmy winner (1975).
- Mahmoud al-Werfalli, 43, Libyan military officer, shot.
- Paul W. Whear, 95, American composer and music educator.
- Martin Woollacott, 81, British journalist.
- Inger-Marie Ytterhorn, 79, Norwegian politician, MP (1989–1993), member of the Norwegian Nobel Committee (2000–2017).

=== 25 ===
- Rais Abin, 94, Indonesian military officer and diplomat, commander of UNEF II (1976–1979).
- Stan Albeck, 89, American basketball coach (San Antonio Spurs, New Jersey Nets, Bradley Braves).
- Rick Azar, 91, American broadcaster (WKBW-TV).
- Bill Brock, 90, American politician, member of the U.S. House of Representatives (1963–1971), senator (1971–1977), and secretary of labor (1985–1987).
- Bobby Brown, 96, American baseball player (New York Yankees) and executive, president of the American League (1984–1994).
- Chuck Burger, 84, American bridge player.
- Gladys Castillo, 98, Venezuelan pediatrician, first lady (1984–1988).
- Zakaria Khan Chowdhury, 87, Bangladeshi politician, MP (1996).
- Beverly Cleary, 104, American children's author (The Mouse and the Motorcycle, Ramona, Dear Mr. Henshaw), Newbery Medal winner (1984).
- Joe Cunningham, 89, American baseball player (St. Louis Cardinals, Chicago White Sox, Washington Senators).
- Manuel Dammert, 72, Peruvian sociologist and politician, member of Congress (1985–1992, 2013–2019), COVID-19.
- Jock Duncan, 95, Scottish singer.
- Robin Gregg, 90, Irish rugby union player.
- Marr Grounds, 90, American-Australian artist.
- Syarwan Hamid, 77, Indonesian military officer and politician, minister of home affairs (1998–1999).
- Tom Hilgendorf, 79, American baseball player (St. Louis Cardinals, Cleveland Indians, Philadelphia Phillies).
- Gil Jouanard, 83, French writer.
- Aleksandr Lipnitsky, 68, Russian musician (Zvuki Mu), drowned.
- Richard Marsina, 97, Slovak historian.
- Larry McMurtry, 84, American novelist and screenwriter (Lonesome Dove, The Last Picture Show, Brokeback Mountain), Oscar winner (2006), heart failure.
- Larry Melancon, 65, American jockey.
- Roman Micał, 82, Polish Olympic hockey player (1960).
- Kanwal Naseer, 78, Pakistani news presenter.
- W. A. G. Pinto, 96, Indian military officer, commandant of the National Defence College (1979–1980).
- Gail Phillips, 76, American politician, member (1991–2001) and speaker (1995–1999) of the Alaska House of Representatives.
- Jim Quaid, 88, Irish hurler.
- Uta Ranke-Heinemann, 93, German theologian, academic and author (Eunuchs for the Kingdom of Heaven).
- Robert Rodan, 83, American actor (Dark Shadows), heart failure.
- Arbi Sanit, 81, Indonesian political scientist.
- Bi Sidi Souleymane, 58, Central African militant, leader of Return, Reclamation, Rehabilitation (since 2015), complications from gunshot wounds.
- Kaleb Stewart, 45, American musician (As Friends Rust, Bridgeburne R), liver disease.
- Nazar Soýunow, 84, Turkmen politician, minister of foreign affairs (1979–1985).
- Randy Tate, 68, American baseball player (New York Mets), complications from COVID-19.
- Bertrand Tavernier, 79, French film director (A Sunday in the Country, Coup de Torchon, Life and Nothing But) and screenwriter.
- Miha Tišler, 94, Slovenian chemist.
- Jan Waszkiewicz, 76, Polish politician, COVID-19.
- Kenneth G. Wiman, 90, American rear admiral.

=== 26 ===
- Želimir Altarac Čičak, 73, Bosnian music promoter, publicist and poet, COVID-19.
- Pandula Andagama, 82, Sri Lankan anthropologist, historian and academic.
- Rateb Al-Awadat, 50, Jordanian football player (Al-Faisaly, national team) and manager (Al-Sheikh Hussein), cancer.
- Elaine Baxter, 88, American politician, Iowa secretary of state (1987–1995).
- Mike Bell, 46, American baseball player (Cincinnati Reds) and coach (Minnesota Twins), kidney cancer.
- Cornelia Catangă, 63, Romanian singer, COVID-19.
- Kamalesh Chandra Chakrabarty, 68, Indian banker, deputy governor of the Reserve Bank of India (2009–2014), heart attack.
- Mary Rawlinson Creason, 96, American aviator.
- John Richard Davey, 63, British-born Australian cricketer (South Australia).
- Anil Dharker, 73, Indian journalist and writer, heart disease.
- František Hajnovič, 71, Slovak economist, minister of finance (2002).
- Ursula Happe, 94, German swimmer, Olympic champion (1956).
- Piet Hartman, 98, Dutch crystallographer.
- Jo Helton, 87, American actress (Dr. Kildare, The Yellow Canary, Dumb and Dumber To).
- Nabindra Raj Joshi, 57, Nepalese politician, minister of industry (2016–2017), MP (since 2008) and deputy mayor of Kathmandu (1992–1997), stroke.
- Hossein Khodaparast, 82, Iranian Olympic footballer (1964).
- Orest Kryvoruchko, 78, Ukrainian artist.
- Lennart Larsson, 91, Swedish cross country skier, Olympic bronze medalist (1956).
- Carole Lavallée, 67, Canadian politician, MP (2004–2011).
- Rod McKie, 63, British cartoonist (Punch, The Wall Street Journal, Harvard Business Review), brain hemorrhage.
- Vili Milisits, 72, Australian pastry chef and businessman.
- Haseena Moin, 79, Pakistani screenwriter (Tanhaiyaan, Dhoop Kinare, Shehzori), cancer.
- Azade Namdari, 36, Iranian actress and television host, suicide.
- S. S. Nijjar, 71, Indian jurist, judge of the Supreme Court (2009–2014) and chief justice of the Calcutta High Court (2007–2009), cardiac arrest.
- Bartomeu Planells, 71, Spanish furniture executive and politician, member of the Balearic Islands Parliament (1987–1991), cancer.
- Paul Polansky, 79, American writer and Romani activist.
- Tadashi Sawamura, 78, Japanese kickboxer.
- Shen Shanjiong, 103, Chinese microbiologist and geneticist, member of the Chinese Academy of Sciences.
- Pete Smith, 76, British Olympic cyclist (1968), injuries sustained in bicycle accident.
- Enzo Spaltro, 92, Italian psychologist.
- Louis St. Louis, 78, American songwriter (Grease).
- Elizabeth Thabethe, 61, South African politician, MP (since 1994), complications from a traffic collision.
- Ilie Vancea, 72, Moldovan politician, minister of education (2000–2002).
- Saâdeddine Zmerli, 91, Tunisian urologist and politician, minister of health (1988–1989).

=== 27 ===
- Amin al-Waeli, 58-59, Yemeni major general.
- Sir Roy Austen-Smith, 96, British air marshal.
- Bill Diessner, 97, American politician, member of the Minnesota Senate (1983–1990).
- Nancy Dillow, 92, Canadian museum curator.
- Peter Fox, 61, Australian-born American computer scientist.
- Zafir Hadžimanov, 77, Macedonian-Serbian singer and actor, COVID-19.
- Leon Hale, 99, American journalist and author (Houston Chronicle, Houston Post).
- Redha Hamiani, 76, Algerian politician, minister for small business (1995).
- Charles Hill, 84, American diplomat and author.
- Todd Kabel, 55, Canadian jockey, Sovereign Award for Outstanding Jockey (1992, 1995, 2003–2006).
- Petr Kellner, 56, Czech financier and investment executive, founder of PPF, helicopter crash.
- Alex Kiddie, 93, Scottish footballer (Aberdeen).
- Barry King, 76, British Olympic decathlete (1972).
- Mary Jeanne Kreek, 84, American neurobiologist.
- Richard Loving, 97, Austrian-born American artist.
- Keith MacDonald, 93, Canadian politician, Ontario MPP (1987–1990).
- Graham Dunstan Martin, 88, British author (The Soul Master, Time-Slip, The Dream Wall).
- Gideon J. Mellenbergh, 82, Dutch psychologist.
- James R. Mills, 93, American politician, member (1961–1982) and president pro tempore (1970–1980) of the California State Senate, kidney cancer.
- Eugenio Mimica Barassi, 71, Chilean writer, member of the Chilean Language Academy (since 2014).
- Patrick O'Malley, 77, Irish politician. TD (1987–1989).
- Odirlei Pessoni, 38, Brazilian Olympic bobsledder (2014, 2018), traffic collision.
- Mahbubur Rahman, 81, Bangladeshi politician, minister of education (1986–1988) and religious affairs (1984–1987).
- Della Roy, 94, American materials scientist.
- Antonio Sanchez, 71, Filipino politician and convicted murderer, mayor of Calauan (1980–1986, 1988–1993).
- Howard Schnellenberger, 87, American football coach (Miami Hurricanes, Louisville Cardinals, Florida Atlantic Owls), national championship winner (1983).
- Paulo Stein, 73, Brazilian journalist and sports announcer, COVID-19.
- Derek Ufton, 92, English cricketer (Kent) and footballer (Charlton Athletic, national team).
- Peter Weiss, 82, German-born Austrian Olympic boxer.
- Sarah Whitmore, 89, British Olympic equestrian (1976).
- Aleksandr Yevteyev, 68, Russian military officer.
- Xie Yuyuan, 96, Chinese pharmaceutical chemist, member of the Chinese Academy of Sciences.
- Mohammad Yunus, 76, Bangladeshi politician, MP (1973–1976, 1986–1990, 2001–2006).
- Jai Zharotia, 74–75, Indian painter and artist, cardiac arrest.

=== 28 ===
- Tuncer Cebeci, 86, Turkish-born American mechanical engineer and academic.
- Malcolm Cecil, 84, British musician (Tonto's Expanding Head Band, Blues Incorporated) and record producer (Talking Book).
- Gianluigi Colalucci, 91, Italian conservator-restorer (Restoration of the Sistine Chapel frescoes).
- Ray Collins, 90, American cartoonist, complications from amyotrophic lateral sclerosis.
- Joseph Edward Duncan, 58, American serial killer, glioblastoma.
- Marisa Ferretti Barth, 89, Italian-born Canadian politician, senator (1997–2006).
- Halyna Hai, 64, Ukrainian poet and writer, COVID-19.
- Jean-Pierre Hébert, 81, French-American artist.
- Christof Heyns, 62, South African human rights lawyer.
- Louise Horne, 108, Trinidadian politician and nutritionist, senator (1976–1991).
- David Kantor, 93, American systems psychologist, complications from a stroke.
- Juventino Kestering, 74, Brazilian Roman Catholic prelate, bishop of Rondonópolis-Guiratinga (2014–2021).
- Karen Kleven, 95, Norwegian politician, deputy MP (1973–1981).
- Jean Langenheim, 95, American plant ecologist.
- Johnny Laws, 78, American Chicago blues guitarist, singer and songwriter.
- Liu Kai-chi, 67, Hong Kong actor (Cageman, Infernal Affairs II, SPL: Sha Po Lang), stomach cancer.
- Xabier Markiegi, 82, Spanish politician, member of the Basque Parliament (1981–1994).
- Neil Merryweather, 75, Canadian musician, brain tumor.
- Mel Pinto, 97, Moroccan-born American bicycle importer.
- Didier Ratsiraka, 84, Malagasy politician, president (1975–1993, 1997–2002), cardiac arrest.
- Kjell Risvik, 79, Norwegian translator.
- Michelle Ross, 66, Jamaican-born Canadian drag entertainer.
- Bobby Schmautz, 76, Canadian ice hockey player (Boston Bruins, Vancouver Canucks, Chicago Blackhawks), pancreatic cancer.
- Constantin Simirad, 79, Romanian politician, mayor of Iași (1992–2003) and diplomat, ambassador to Cuba (2003–2006), COVID-19.
- Enrico Vaime, 85, Italian television and radio presenter, author and playwright.
- Géza Varga, 74, Hungarian agrarian manager and politician, MP (2010–2014).
- Neil Windsor, 75, Canadian politician, Newfoundland and Labrador MHA (1975–1995).

=== 29 ===
- Constantin Brodzki, 96, Belgian architect.
- Carlos Busqued, 50, Argentine writer, radio producer, and engineer.
- Claude Callegari, 58, English football fan and YouTube personality.
- Antonio Caro, 71, Colombian conceptual artist, heart failure.
- Rex Malcolm Chaplin Dawson, 96, British biochemist.
- Saverio De Michele, 97, Italian businessman and politician, mayor of Olbia (1956–1963).
- Bashkim Fino, 58, Albanian politician, prime minister (1997), deputy prime minister (1997–1998) and deputy (since 1997), COVID-19.
- Jerry Griffin, 76, American football player (Edmonton Eskimos, Saskatchewan Roughriders).
- Jane Helwig, 73, American computer scientist.
- William Hill, 90, American politician.
- Bob Houmard, 74, American football player (Winnipeg Blue Bombers, Ottawa Rough Riders).
- Elaine Hugh-Jones, 93, Welsh pianist and composer.
- Theodore Lambrinos, 85, Greek-American opera singer, complications from COVID-19.
- Bibian Mentel, 48, Dutch snowboarder, Paralympic champion (2014, 2018), cancer.
- Sarah Onyango Obama, 99, Kenyan educator and philanthropist, complications from diabetes and a stroke.
- Robert Opron, 89, French automotive designer, COVID-19.
- Park Kyung-ho, 91, South Korean football player (national team) and manager, Asian Games silver medallist (1958).
- Ferdinand Schladen, 81, German shot putter.
- David A. Shirley, 86, American chemist.
- Surendra Sirsat, 75, Indian politician, Goa MLA (1977–1980, 1989–1999), liver disease.
- L. Dennis Smith, 83, American embryologist and academic administrator, president of the University of Nebraska system (1994–2004).
- Elwood Thorpe, 92, American politician, member of the North Dakota House of Representatives (1991–1993, 1997–2010).
- Adam Toledo, 13, American teenager, shot.

=== 30 ===
- Nazar Albaryan, 77, Armenian Olympic wrestler (1968).
- Junko Asahina, 67, Japanese actress and singer, multiple organ failure.
- Maria Bofill, 83–84, Spanish potter, COVID-19.
- Jean Bourlès, 90, French racing cyclist.
- Vincent Brümmer, 88, South African-Dutch philosopher and theologian.
- Contardo Calligaris, 72, Italian-Brazilian psychoanalyst and writer, cancer.
- Enrico Clementi, 89, Italian chemist, kidney infection.
- Josefina Cuesta, 74, Spanish historian and academic.
- Giancarlo DiTrapano, 47, American publisher.
- Gérard Filippelli, 78, French actor (Bons Baisers de Hong Kong, The Big Store), musician and composer (Les Charlots).
- Myra Frances, 78, British actress (Doctor Who), cancer.
- Claire dela Fuente, 62, Filipino singer, cardiac arrest.
- Dhananjay Jadhav, 74, Indian police officer, Mumbai police commissioner (2007–2008), heart disease.
- Guy Lelièvre, 69, Canadian politician, Quebec MNA (1994–2008).
- G. Gordon Liddy, 90, American FBI agent, convicted criminal (Watergate scandal) and radio host.
- Khaya Makina, 56, South African military leader. (death announced on this date)
- Germán Medina Triviño, Colombian politician, governor of Caquetá Department (2010–2011), shot.
- Maurizio Moretti, 76, Italian footballer (S.P.A.L.), COVID-19.
- Carlo Mosca, 75, Italian prefect and magistrate, pneumonia.
- Patrick O. O'Meara, 83, South African-born American educator and author.
- Francis Otunta, 62, Nigerian mathematician and academic administrator, vice-chancellor of Michael Okpara University of Agriculture (2016–2021), traffic collision.
- Thomas Saisi, 75, Kenyan Olympic runner (1968, 1972).
- Evelyn Sakash, 66, American production designer (Mermaids), heart disease. (body discovered on this date)
- Chuck Schilling, 83, American baseball player (Boston Red Sox).
- Ferenc Somogyi, 75, Hungarian politician, foreign minister (2004–2006), ambassador to the United States (2007–2009).
- Tony Turner, 88, British Olympic diver (1952).
- Alex Woo, 47, American jewelry designer, cancer.
- Billie Young, 73, American actress and poet.

=== 31 ===
- Carl Allen, 65, American football player (St. Louis Cardinals).
- Jean-Christophe Balouet, 64, French paleontologist and forensic scientist, stroke.
- Angelo Bertoni, 87, Australian politician, Queensland MLA (1974–1983).
- Alice Butler-Short, 77, Irish-American political activist and campaigner.
- Tamara Chikunova, 72, Uzbek human rights activist.
- Lee Collins, 32, English footballer (Port Vale, Northampton Town, Mansfield Town), suicide by hanging.
- Richard Coren, 66, American bridge player, Crohn's disease.
- John Doak, 62, Australian Olympic sprint canoeist.
- Anzor Erkomaishvili, 80, Georgian composer and musician (Rustavi Ensemble), MP (2008–2009), COVID-19.
- Paul Feinman, 61, American lawyer and jurist, associate judge of the New York Court of Appeals (since 2017).
- Kamal Ganzouri, 88, Egyptian politician, prime minister (1996–1999, 2011–2012).
- Ron Greene, 82, American college basketball coach (Mississippi State, Murray State, Indiana State).
- Cleve Hall, 61, American special effects artist (Metalstorm: The Destruction of Jared-Syn, Alienator), make-up artist and actor.
- Hsu Shui-teh, 89, Taiwanese politician, minister of the interior (1988–1991), president of the Examination Yuan (1996–2002), and mayor of Taipei (1985–1988), pneumonia.
- Ivan Klajn, 84, Serbian linguist, philologist and language historian, COVID-19.
- Diede Lameiro, 87, Brazilian football manager (Ferroviária, São Paulo, Palmeiras).
- Li Jingwen, 88, Chinese economist, member of the Chinese Academy of Engineering and the Chinese Academy of Social Sciences.
- Jane Manning, 82, English operatic soprano.
- Lee Marmon, 95, American Laguna Pueblo photographer and author.
- Jerry McGee, 77, American golfer.
- Mary Mullarkey, 77, American jurist, justice (1987–2010) and chief justice (1998–2010) of the Colorado Supreme Court, multiple sclerosis.
- Pedro Nel Gil, 93, Colombian road racing cyclist.
- Ivair Nogueira do Pinho, 69, Brazilian politician, Minas Gerais MLA (1995–2011) and mayor of Betim (1991–1992), COVID-19.
- Kjellaug Nordsjö, 94, Swedish-Norwegian icon painter.
- Climent Palmitjavila, 80, Andorran politician, member of the General Council (1986–1992).
- Erwin Piechowiak, 84, German footballer (HSV).
- Valerie Pitts, 83, British television presenter (Play School).
- James B. Ramsey, 83, American econometrician.
- Ken Reitz, 69, American baseball player (St. Louis Cardinals, San Francisco Giants, Pittsburgh Pirates).
- Winfred Rembert, 75, American artist.
- Khwaja Saeed Hai, 91, Pakistani tennis player.
- Gregory K. Scott, 72, American jurist, justice of the Colorado Supreme Court (1993–2000).
- Mike Sensibaugh, 72, American football player (Kansas City Chiefs, St. Louis Cardinals).
- Izabella Sierakowska, 74, Polish politician, deputy (1989–2005, 2007–2011).
- Fabriciano Sigampa, 84, Argentine Roman Catholic prelate, archbishop of Resistencia (2005–2013), bishop of La Rioja (1992–2005) and Reconquista (1985–1992).
- Jean-Pierre Tafunga Mbayo, 78, Congolese Roman Catholic prelate, bishop of Kilwa–Kasenga (1992–2002) and Uvira (2002–2008), archbishop of Lubumbashi (since 2010).
- Arkady Ter-Tadevosyan, 81, Armenian major general.
- Muhammad Wakkas, 69, Bangladeshi politician, MP (1986–1991, 2001–2006).
- Jadwiga Wysoczanská, 93, Czech opera singer (National Theatre soloist).
- Carlos Pedro Zilli, 66, Brazilian-born Bissau-Guinean Roman Catholic prelate, bishop of Bafatá (since 2001), COVID-19.
- Stefano Zuccherini, 67, Italian politician, senator (2006–2008).
