= Gilles Rossignol =

French writer and editor (died 2021)

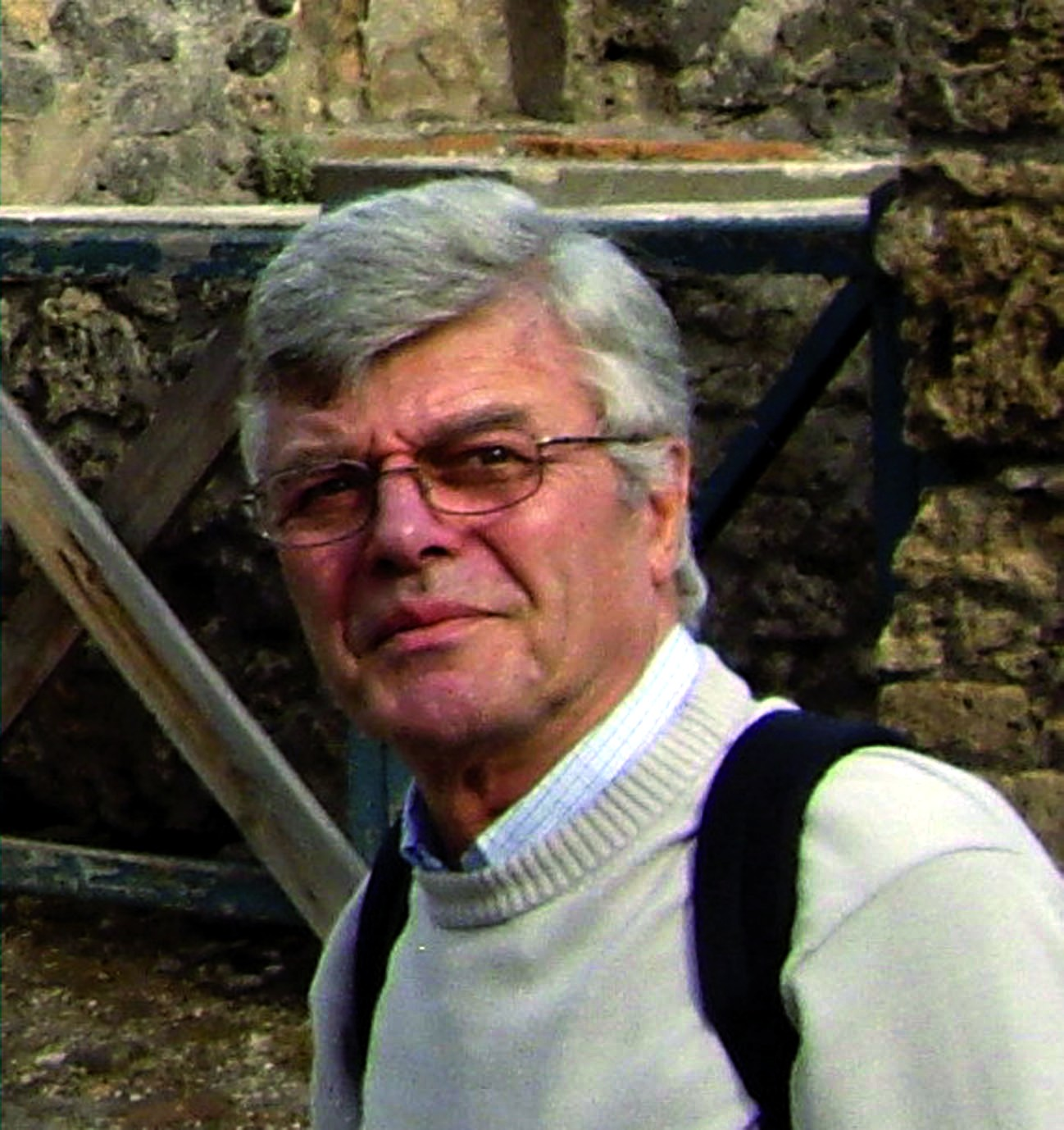
- Born: Vernon, France
- Died: 23 March 2021
- Occupations: Writer; Editor

Gilles Rossignol (died 23 March 2021) was a French author and editor.

== Biography ==
Rossignol graduated from Sciences Po in 1974 with a degree in Muslim rights. He was the author of numerous articles on the Middle East and Arab World, in particular Afghanistan and Tunisia. He also wrote about the Francophone world and the history of Creuse. After teaching at the Institut international d'administration publique, the Tunis National School of Administration, and the Université de Montréal, he served as Mayor of Chambon-Sainte-Croix from 1995 to 2006. He began contributing to the "rural chronicle" of the Bulletin des élus locaux in 2003. He also served as a cultural and technical advisor in the French Embassy in Kabul. There, he collaborated with the newspaper Les Nouvelles d'Afghanistan and was President of AFRANE. He became a Knight of the Legion of Honour in 2002.

Gilles Rossignol died on 23 March 2021.

== Books ==
- L’élection du Parlement européen au suffrage universel (1980)
- Afghanistan, la colonisation impossible (1984)
- Le guide de la Creuse (1988)
- Afghanistan. The Last thirty years (1988)
- Le guide de la Champagne (1989)
- Le guide du Calvados (1990)
- Pierre d’Aubusson, « le bouclier de la chrétienté ». Les Hospitaliers à Rhodes (1991)
- Le guide du littoral. 300 sites naturels protégés (1993)
- Le Moutier d’Ahun (1993)
- La Creuse, le beau pays (1995)
- Nouveaux contes et nouvelles de la Creuse, avec quelques histoires galantes (1998)
- L’Eure. Le guide (2001)
- Le carrefour afghan (2002)
- Moi, maire rural (2008)
- Paysages du centre de l'Afghanistan. Paysages naturels, paysages culturels (Hindou-Kouch, lacs de Band-e Amir, vallée de Bamiyan) (2010)
- 90 ans de relations France-Afghanistan, 1922-2012. Histoire et perspectives (2012)
- Afghanistan. Chroniques d'histoire (2018)
