= Gyula Szersén =

Hungarian actor (1940–2021)

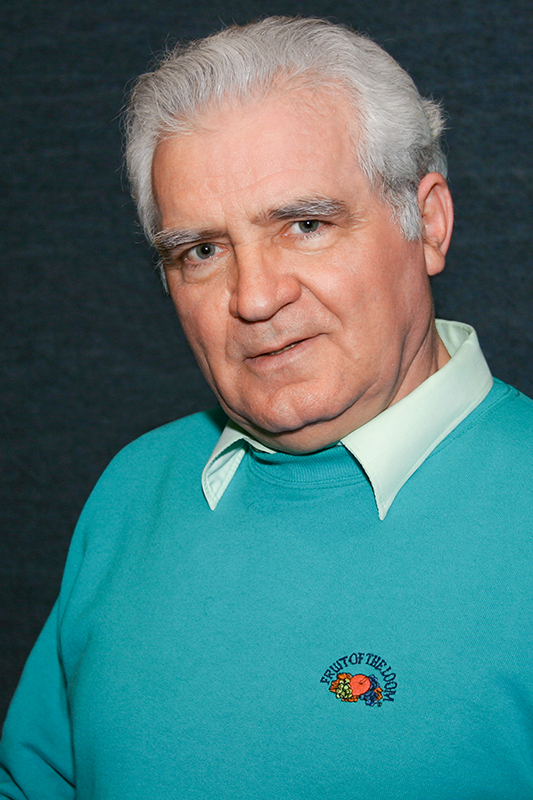
Gyula Szersén

Gyula Szersén (22 November 1940 – 17 March 2021) was a Hungarian film, television and voice actor.
