= Pedro Jiménez Galán =

Spanish politician (1920–2021)

Pedro Jiménez Galán (April 14, 1920 – March 3, 2021) was a Spanish politician. He was a deputy in the Constituent Cortes from 1977 to 1979.
