= Hervé Cassan =

French diplomat (1947–2021)

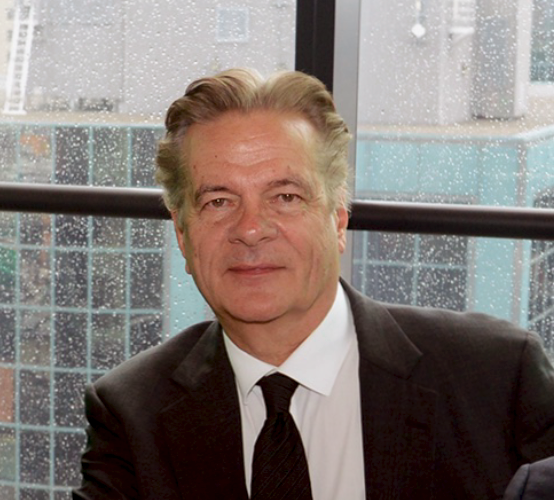
- Cassan in 2017
- Born: 8 March 1947; Nîmes, France
- Died: 8 March 2021 (aged 74)
- Occupations: Diplomat; Professor

Hervé Cassan (8 March 1947 – 8 March 2021) was a French diplomat, professor and lawyer. He was an advisor to the secretary-general of the United Nations, Boutros Boutros-Ghali, and his successor, Kofi Annan. He also directed the cabinet of the Organisation internationale de la Francophonie and was a professor in the Faculty of Law at the Université de Sherbrooke.

== Biography ==
Cassan had a career as both a diplomat and an academic. He advised two United Nations secretaries-general in New York City, and was a special counselor to the secretary-general of the Organisation internationale de la Francophonie. He also directed the organization's cabinet. Other positions of his included his time as a lawyer and international consultant.

Cassan was a professor of law at Paris Descartes University for 15 years. He was a visiting professor at The Hague Academy of International Law, the Graduate Institute of International Studies in Geneva and Louisiana State University in the United States. In 2010, he became a law professor at the Université de Sherbrooke in Quebec. His research focused on international mediation and negotiation, as well as procedures for solving international conflicts. He served on the special counsel of the Institute for Research and Education on Negotiation, associated with the ESSEC Business School in Paris.

Cassan died on 8 March 2021, his 74th birthday.

== Books ==
- Contrats internationaux et pays en développement (1990)
- Droit international du Développement (1991)
- Droit international du développement (2019)
- Traité pratique de négociation (2019)
