= Mario Boccalatte =

Italian footballer (1933–2021)

Personal information
- Date of birth: 4 May 1933
- Place of birth: Biella, Italy
- Date of death: 10 March 2021 (aged 87)
- Position: Midfielder

Senior career*
Years	Team	Apps	(Gls)
1951–1953	Biellese	18	(0)
1953–1954	Cossatese	30	(0)
1954–1955	Saluzzo	25	(0)
1955–1957	Biellese	67	(1)
1957–1958	Monza	7	(0)
1958–1960	Reggiana	58	(0)
1960–1965	Biellese	133	(0)
1965–1967	Cossatese	59	(0)
Total		397	(1)
- * Club domestic league appearances and goals

Mario Boccalatte (4 May 1933 – 10 March 2021) was an Italian professional footballer who played as a midfielder.

== Career ==
Born in Biella, Boccalatte played for Biellese, Cossatese, Saluzzo, Monza and Reggiana.

== Later life ==
After retiring as a footballer he worked for a bank, and died on 10 March 2021, aged 87.
