= Étienne Flaubert Batangu Mpesa =

Congolese pharmacist and researcher (1942–2021)

- Born: 4 November 1942; Manyanga, Belgian Congo
- Died: 5 March 2021 (aged 78); Kinshasa, Democratic Republic of the Congo
- Occupations: Pharmacist; Researcher

Étienne Flaubert Batangu Mpesa (4 November 1942 – 5 March 2021) was a Congolese pharmacist and scientific researcher.

== Biography ==
Batangu Mpesa earned his pharmaceutical degree from the University of Kinshasa in 1971. He then earned a master's degree in pharmaceutical sciences. In 1980, he founded the Centre de recherche pharmaceutique de Luozi. He later created its website and remained its top researcher. His daughter, Mamyssa Batangu Mpesa, also became a pharmacist.

Batangu Mpesa invented the prescription drug Manadiar, which was designed to combat amoebic diarrhea. He also created Manalaria, which helped fight malaria. In November 2020, he had his drug Manacovid, approved by the Ministry of Public Health of the Democratic Republic of the Congo. The drug was designed to treat COVID-19. It has yet to be approved by the World Health Organization.

Étienne Flaubert Batangu Mpesa died of pancreatic cancer in Kinshasa on 5 March 2021 at the age of 78.
