= Jean-Jacques Viton =

French poet (1933–2021)

- Born: 24 May 1933
- Died: 14 March 2021 (aged 87); Marseille, France
- Occupation: Poet

Jean-Jacques Viton (24 May 1933 – 14 March 2021) was a French poet.

== Biography ==
Viton spent his childhood in London and moved to Marseille during World War II. After the war, he lived in Morocco and served in the French Navy until 1958. From 1958 to 1963, he worked as an administrator at Marseille's Théâtre Quotidien. He co-founded the newspaper Banana Split with Liliane Giraudon in 1980.

In May 2018, Viton played a key role in the petition to boycott the cross-cultural festival "France-Israël" in support of Palestine in the Israeli–Palestinian conflict. On his last book, Cette histoire n’est plus la nôtre mais à qui la voudra, Jean-Philippe Cazier commented: "One of the challenges of Jean-Jacques Viton's writing is not to “To make the real”, the world, but to follow its lines, to open up to its existence, to create futures with the world and to let them constitute the text. [...] It is the relation to the world that takes precedence over the logic of the language, it is the order and disorder of the world that exist on the page, not what is ordered by language habits and requirements. How to say the world without it being erased by the act of saying it?"

Jean-Jacques Viton died in Marseille on 14 March 2021 at the age of 87.

== Works ==
- Au bord des yeux (1963)
- Sept peintres - Sept poètes (1963)
- du Z (1973)
- jaune c’est une orange (1976)
- Image d’une place pour le Requiem de Gabriel Fauré (1979)
- Terminal (1981)
- Principes de lieux I (1983)
- Le Wood (1983)
- Épisodes du vent (1983)
- Some post cards about CRJ and other cards (1984)
- Lignes de manœuvre (1984)
- Douze apparitions calmes de nus et leur suite, qu'elles provoquent (1984)
- Décollage (1986)
- Galas (1989)
- Épisodes (1990)
- La Formation du cavalier (1991)
- L'Année du serpent (1992)
- Accumulation Vite (1994)
- J-L. S. et J-J. V. - Marseille (10.45-20.00) (1995)
- Les Poètes (Vestiaire) (1996)
- Comme un voyage en Chine (1996)
- L'Assiette (1996)
- Transformateur (1998)
- Le Voyage d’été (1999)
- Poème pour la main gauche (1999)
- Patchinko (2001)
- Comme ça (2003)
- Shanghaï (2004)
- Kanaka (2006)
- Température du langage (2006)
- Marseille-Postcards (2006)
- Je voulais m'en aller mais je n'ai pas bougé (2008)
- Selected sueurs (2010)
- Zama (2012)
- Ça recommence (2014)
- Cette histoire n’est plus la nôtre mais à qui la voudra (2016)
