= Bob Curtis (politician) =

American politician (1933–2021)

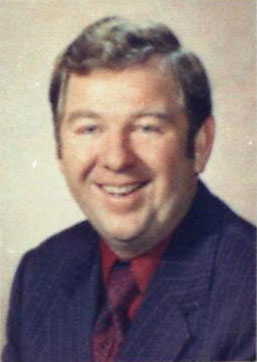
- Curtis in 1973

Member of the Washington House of Representatives for the 12th district
- In office 1971–1977

Personal details
- Born: November 17, 1933 Wenatchee, Washington, United States
- Died: March 7, 2021 (aged 87) East Wenatchee, Washington, United States
- Party: Republican
- Occupation: businessman

Robert Curtis (November 7, 1933 - March 7, 2021) was an American politician in the state of Washington. He served the 12th district from 1971 to 1977.
