= Glenn T. Freeman =

American politician

Member of the South Dakota House of Representatives
- In office 1979–1982

Personal details
- Born: November 15, 1929 Murdo, South Dakota, U.S.
- Died: March 20, 2021 (aged 91)
- Party: Republican
- Spouse(s): Lucy Willard Allison; Joyce Glynn

Glenn T. Freeman (November 15, 1929 – March 20, 2021) was an American politician. He served as a Republican member of the South Dakota House of Representatives.

== Life and career ==
Freeman was born in Murdo, South Dakota, the son of Lillian and Jesse Freeman. He attended Stamford School.

Freeman was a campground owner in Midland, South Dakota.

In 1979, Freeman was elected to the South Dakota House of Representatives, serving until 1982.

Freeman died in March 2021, at the age of 91.
