= Albert Vallvé =

Spanish politician (1945–2021)

Albert Vallvé i Navarro (2 December 1945 – 7 March 2021) was a Spanish politician. He was elected as member of the Senate of Spain representing the Province of Tarragona for Convergence and Union in 1993.
