= Blanquita Valenti =

American politician (died 2021)

- Born: December 28, 1933; Santurce, Puerto Rico
- Died: March 9, 2021 (aged 87); New Brunswick, New Jersey
- Occupation: Politician

Blanquita Bird Valenti (December 28, 1933 – March 9, 2021) was an American politician from New Brunswick, New Jersey.

== Biography ==
Bird graduated from the Convent of the Sacred Heart in Connecticut and Rosemont College, Pennsylvania. In 1956, she married Thomas Valenti. Mrs. Valenti also earned a master's degree in teaching from Seton Hall University, and in Spanish and Latin American literature from Rutgers University. In 1971, she was appointed to the New Brunswick Board of Education, the first Latina in the state to serve in such a role.

In 1990, she was appointed to the New Brunswick City Council to fill a vacancy, subsequently being re-elected five times, including holding the office of Council President and vice-president. In 2004, Valenti was elected to the Middlesex County Board of Chosen Freeholders (now Commissioners), serving five terms until her retirement in 2019.

She was honored for her works at her 15th anniversary. Valenti was the first Latina to serve in those two positions. After announcing her retirement, she retired in 2019.

Valenti died on March 9, 2021, at age 87. Politicians from the senate expressed their condolences. She was buried at St. Peter's Cemetery in New Brunswick.

On September 8, a school was opened for students named after Blanquita in New Brunswick, New Jersey possessing the mascot of a Blue jay
