= Francesco Trabucco =

Italian architect (1944–2021)

Francesco Trabucco (14 November 1944 – 14 March 2021) was an Italian architect and designer. He was a five-time winner of the Compasso d'Oro.

Trabucco died from COVID-19 in Milan on 14 March 2021, at the age of 76.
