= Patrick Rieupeyrout =

French sailor

Patrick Rieupeyrout (24 May 1951 – 11 March 2021) was a French sailor who competed in the 1972 Summer Olympics.
