= Samuel J. Scott =

American engineer (1938–2021)

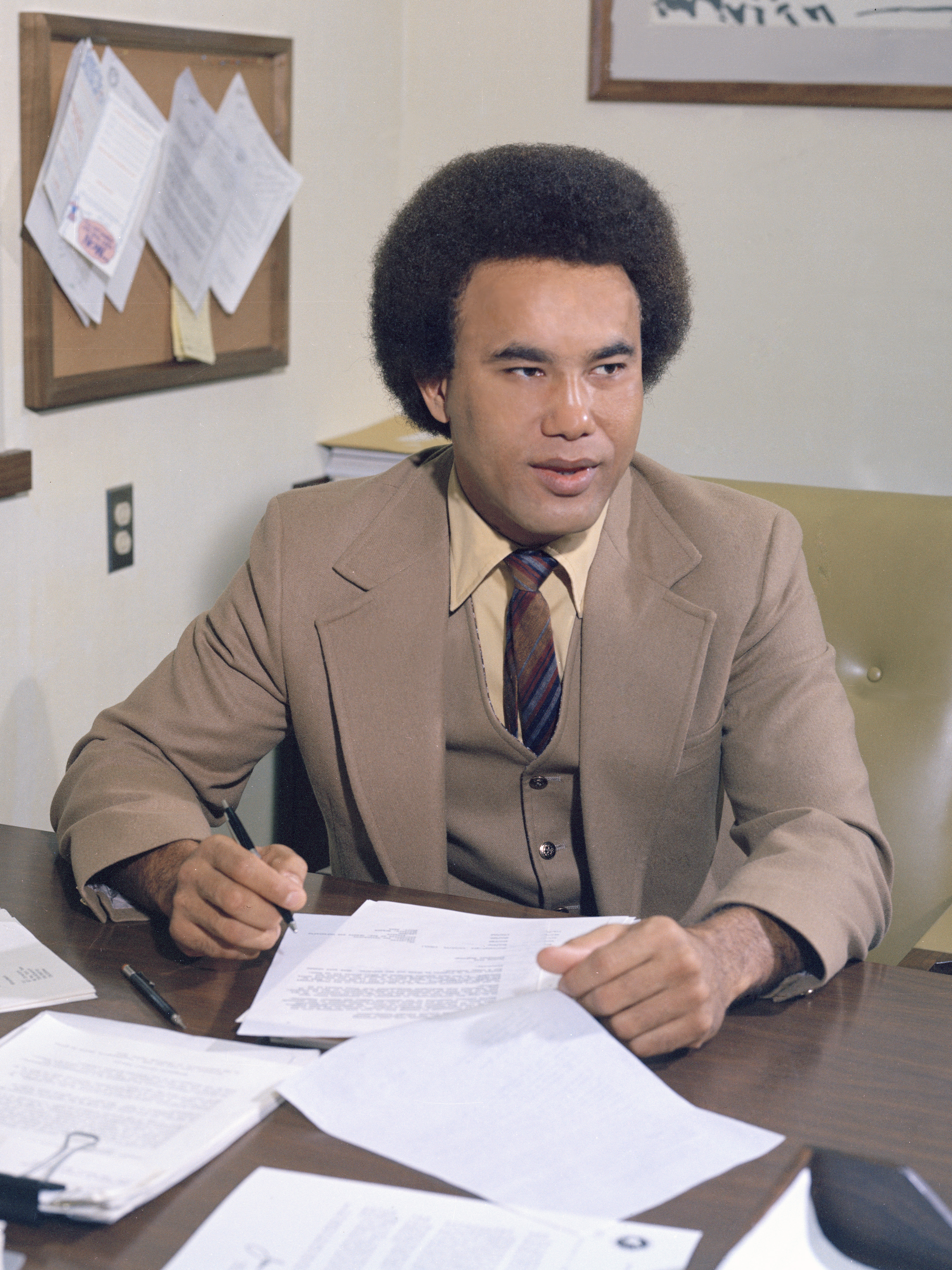
- Samuel J. Scott at his desk at NASA in 1974
- Born: August 26, 1938; Mobile, Alabama, U.S.
- Died: March 5, 2021 (aged 82); Hampton, Virginia, U.S.
- Occupation: Engineer
- Children: 4

Samuel J. Scott (August 26, 1938 – March 5, 2021) was an American engineer. He was among the first four Black engineers at NASA's Langley Research Center in 1962, after graduating from the University of Pittsburgh's aeronautical engineering program and served as Assistant Director for structures at Langley. He later served as the president of the National Technical Association, served as the chief engineer for the city of Newport News, Virginia, and the Newport Redeployment and Housing Authority, and a senior manager at Newport News Shipbuilding.

== NASA ==
After graduation, "he was hired sight unseen" by Langley based on his qualifications and Scott remarked in an interview that "one of the guys in the branch said 'I didn't know he was Black'" when he first arrived at Langley. Among others, he worked with Katherine Johnson and Mary Jackson.

== Personal life ==
He was the last full-time life guard at the historically black, segregated Bay Shore Beach.

He died March 5, 2021, in Hampton, Virginia, after a sudden illness. He was survived by his wife Ann Carol Scott, and their four children.
