= Doug Williams (polygraph critic) =

American polygraph critic (1945–2021)

- Douglas Gene Williams
- Born: Douglas Gene Williams; 6 October 1945
- Died: 19 March 2021 (aged 75)
- Resting place: Cremated
- Occupations: Polygraph examiner (formerly), Polygraph critic, Author
- Employer(s): US law enforcement (formerly), Private companies (formerly)
- Known for: Criticizing polygraph tests, teaching techniques to purportedly beat polygraphs
- Notable work: From Cop to Crusader: My Fight Against the Dangerous Myth of "Lie Detection."*, *How to Sting the Polygraph*
- Television: Appeared on 60 Minutes
- Status: Convicted
- Convictions: Mail fraud, witness tampering
- Criminal charges: Mail fraud, witness tampering
- Penalty: Two years in prison

Douglas Gene Williams (October 6, 1945 – March 19, 2021) was an American critic of polygraph tests. Williams administered polygraph tests for US law enforcement and private companies but came to consider the tests unreliable and harmful. He subsequently quit and spent decades publicly condemning polygraph tests and commercially teaching techniques purported to affect test results.

Williams' activism included appearing on 60 Minutes and testifying before a US Congressional subcommittee. His teaching business led him to be the target of a federal sting operation in 2012 and 2013, in which agents announced intentions to use his methods to lie in polygraph tests to conceal crimes and maintain government employment. Williams provided instruction to the agents, and in 2015, he was convicted on multiple counts of mail fraud and witness tampering and sentenced to two years in prison.

According to AntiPolygraph.org, Williams resumed publicly providing polygraph-taking instruction after his supervised release ended in 2020. He died in 2021 following an illness and was cremated.

== Bibliography ==
- (2014) From Cop to Crusader: My Fight Against the Dangerous Myth of "Lie Detection." Wise Media Group. ISBN 978-1935689737
- (2020) How to Sting the Polygraph. Polygraph.com. ISBN 978-1734751505
