= Sergio Badiola =

Chilean Army general

Sergio Badiola (25 August 1930 – 9 March 2021) was a Chilean Army general. He served as minister secretary-general of government of Chile.
