= Stanislav Meleiko =

Russian journalist (1937–2021)

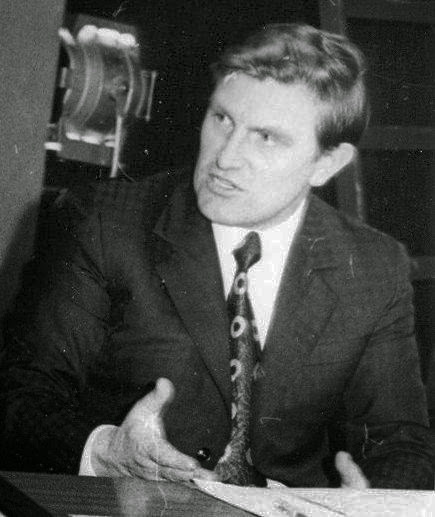
Stanislav Meleiko

Stanislav Evgenievich Meleiko (Russian: Станислав Евгеньевич Мелейко) (February 6, 1937 – March 8, 2021) was a Russian journalist, TV presenter, director, and producer of his own programs.

Meleiko was the author and presenter of the program Citizen and the Law on Channel 5 from 1970 to 1996. Since 1997, he was the author of his own programs. He prepared programs and reports for various television and Internet Channels of REN TV.
