= Carole McCartney =

American-born Cypriot archeologist (1965–2021)

- Born: 1965; Pittsburgh, Pennsylvania
- Died: 13 March 2021 (aged 55–56)
- Occupation: archeologist

Carole McCartney (1965 – 13 March 2021) was a Pittsburgh-born Cypriot archeologist.

== Education ==
She studied archaeology at the University of Edinburgh, finishing her masters (1989) and her PhD (1996) with her doctoral thesis titled, The Analysis of Variability in Simple Core Technologies: Case Studies of Chipped Stone Technology in Post-PPN Assemblages from the Levant.

== Career ==
She took part in excavations in Cyprus and the Eastern Mediterranean for more than 30 years. As she was a worldwide leading expert on the study of lithics, she made important finds and identifications from sites in the eastern Mediterranean region. She published numerous academic papers about them.

== Personal life ==
McCartney first traveled to Cyprus in 1987, and later acquired Cypriot citizenship. McCartney married Pambos Michael, with whom she raised two children. She lived with her family in Kissonerga, Cyprus.

McCartney died on 13 March 2021.

== Selected works ==
McCartney published more than 25 singled-authored papers, and 25 more in joint efforts with other authors.

- Peltenburg, E., Colledge, S., Croft, P., Jackson, A., McCartney, C., & Murray, M. A. (2000). Agro-pastoralist colonization of Cyprus in the 10th millennium BP: initial assessments. Antiquity, 74(286), 844–853.
- McCartney, C., Manning, S. W., Rosendahl, S., & Stewart, S. T. (2008). Elaborating Early Neolithic Cyprus (EENC): preliminary report on the 2007 field season: excavations and regional field survey at Agia Varvara-Asprokremnos. Report of the Department of Antiquities, Cyprus, 2008, 67–86.
- McCartney, C. (1998). Preliminary Report on the Chipped Stone Assemblage from the Aceramic Neolithic Site of Ayia Varvara Asprokremnos, Cyprus. Levant, 30(1), 85–90.
- Webb, J. M., Frankel, D., Croft, P., & McCartney, C. (2009). Excavations at Politiko Kokkinorotsos. A Chalcolithic hunting station in Cyprus. In Proceedings of the Prehistoric society (Vol. 75, pp. 189–237). Cambridge University Press.
- Manning, S. W., McCartney, C., Kromer, B., & Stewart, S. T. (2010). The earlier Neolithic in Cyprus: recognition and dating of a Pre-Pottery Neolithic A occupation. Antiquity, 84(325), 693–706.
- McCartney, C., Manning, S. W., Sewell, D., & Stewart, S. T. (2010). Reconsidering early Holocene Cyprus within the eastern Mediterranean landscape. Landscapes in transition, 133–146.
