= Gabriel Milési =

French journalist and writer (1947–2021)

- Born: 7 August 1947; Foix, France
- Died: 19 March 2021 (aged 73); Venice, Italy
- Occupations: Journalist; Writer

Gabriel Milési (7 August 1947 – 19 March 2021) was a French journalist and writer. He was the CEO of France Inter from 1984 to 1988, Editor-in-Chief of Le Quotidien de Paris from 1988 to 1989, Editor-in Chief of Europe 1 from 1990 to 1999, and then collection director of Michel de Maule. He was a Knight of the Legion of Honour and an Officer of the Ordre national du Mérite.

== Publications ==
- Jacques Delors (1984)
- Les Nouvelles 200 Familles (1990)
- L'homme qui dit non (1995)
- Le Roman de l'euro
- Les Dynasties du pouvoir de l'argent (2011)
- Entreprendre à grands pas
- La Vénitienne de Bonaparte (2013)
- Venise trahie (2018)
