= Adelio Terraroli =

Italian politician (1931–2021)

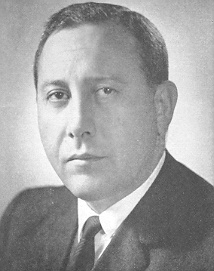
- Terraroli in the 1960s

Member of the Italian Chamber of Deputies for Brescia
- In office 5 June 1968 – 19 June 1979

Personal details
- Born: 24 July 1931 Brescia, Kingdom of Italy
- Died: 5 March 2021 (aged 89) Brescia, Italy
- Party: PCI

Adelio Terraroli (24 July 1931 – 5 March 2021) was an Italian politician. He served in the Chamber of Deputies from 1968 to 1979 as a member of the Italian Communist Party. During his time in office, he was present at the Piazza della Loggia bombing in 1974. He also served in the Regional Council of Lombardy.

== Biography ==
As provincial secretary of the Italian Communist Party in 1960, he was elected to the Chamber of Deputies for three terms, serving from 1968 to 1979.

In 1980, he was elected to the Regional Council of Lombardy, where he served as leader of the Italian Communist Party (PCI), and was re-elected in 1985; his term ended in 1990.

He died in 2021 at the age of 89.
