= Swain Wolfe =

American author and filmmaker (1939-2021)

- Born: 1939; Denver, Colorado, U.S.
- Died: March 14, 2021 (aged 82); Missoula, Montana, U.S.
- Occupations: Author, filmmaker

Swain Wolfe (1939 - March 14, 2021) was an American author and filmmaker.

== Life and career ==
Wolfe lived for most of his life in and around Missoula, MT.

Wolfe was a highschool dropout who worked a series of manual jobs, including logging and working in mines, in the western US before making movies and writing books.

Wolfe's films include The Sacred Bear, Phantom Cowboy, and Energy & Morality.

Wolfe's novels include:

- The Woman Who Lives in the Earth, HarperCollins (New York, NY), 1996. ISBN 978-0060174118
- The Lake Dreams the Sky, Cliff Street Books (New York, NY), 1998. ISBN 978-0060929930
- The Parrot Trainer, St. Martin's Press (New York, NY), 2003. ISBN 978-0312310929

Wolfe's last published book was a memoir, The Boy Who Invented Skiing: A Memoir, St. Martin's Press (New York, NY), 2006. ISBN 978-0312310936

He died on March 14, 2021, in Missoula, MT.
