= Víctor Espinoza Peña =

Peruvian politician (1947–2021)

District Mayor of Pucusana
- In office 29 June 2020 – 1 March 2021
- Preceded by: Luis Chauca Navarro
- Succeeded by: Lidia Carrillo Véliz

Deputy District Mayor of Pucusana
- In office 1 January 2019 – 28 June 2020
- Preceded by: Evaristo Sarmiento Sobrado
- Succeeded by: Lidia Carrillo Véliz

Personal details
- Born: 25 May 1947; Pucusana, Peru
- Died: 1 March 2021 (aged 73)
- Political party: APP

Víctor Espinoza Peña (25 May 1947 – 1 March 2021) was a Peruvian politician and fisherman.

== Biography ==
Born in Pucusana, Espinoza Peña finished his primary studies and became an artisanal fisherman. He was elected Deputy District Mayor of Pucusana in the 2018 Lima municipal election alongside Mayor Luis Chauca Navarro of the Alliance for Progress party. He became Mayor after Navarro died from COVID-19 on 28 June 2020, during the COVID-19 pandemic in Peru.

On 6 February 2021, Espinoza Peña reported that he had tested positive for COVID-19. He died on 1 March 2021, the second mayor of Pucusana to die from the virus.
