= Pavel Oliva =

Czech philologist (1923–2021)

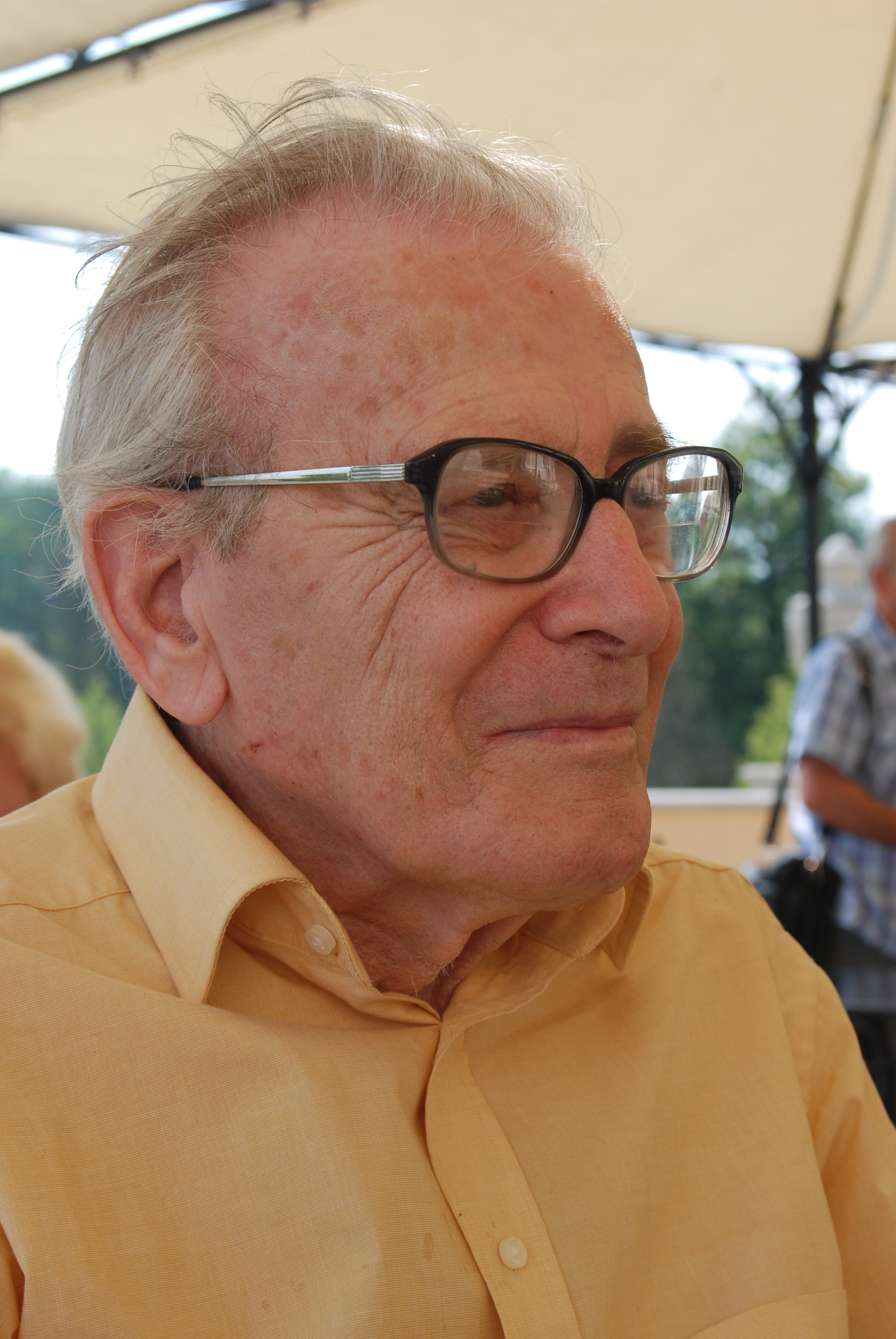
Pavel Oliva, 2012

Pavel Oliva, born Pavel Ohrenstein (23 November 1923 – 5 March 2021) was a Czech classical philologist, historian of antiquity, writer and Holocaust survivor.

== Works ==
- Řecko mezi Makedonií a Římem, Academia, 1995. ISBN 80-200-0435-1
- Kolébka demokracie: dějiny a kultura klasického Řecka 5.–4. století př. n. l., Arista, 2000. ISBN 80-86410-04-8
- Zrození evropské civilizace, Arista, Epocha, 2003. ISBN 80-86410-37-4
- Holokaust mé rodiny, Arista, 2009. ISBN 978-80-86410-59-3
