= Alex Woo =

American jewelry designer (1974–2021)

- Industry: Jeweller and retailer
- Founded: 2001
- Founder: Alex Woo
- Headquarters: New York, NY, United States
- Website: www.alexwoo.com

Alex Woo (1974 – March 30, 2021) was an American retailer and fine jewelry designer located in New York, New York. She was known for her sculptural charms that blend premium craftsmanship.

== Personal life ==
Woo's father, Alexander Woo, was a bench jeweler and began teaching her the basics of jewelry making when she was five years old. He taught her the appreciation of gems, precious metals and fine craftsmanship. He continued to serve as her mentor as she went on to study at Cornell University, The American University of Paris and the Parsons School of Design.

She died of cancer in 2021.

== Alex Woo Jewelry ==
With her Little Icons™ Collection, Woo was the first jewelry designer, who specialized in personalization. In 2001 Woo founded her own New York-based company Alex Woo Jewelry.

In 2009, she co-designed with Christina Applegate a pendant that raises money for Applegate's Right Action for Women foundation. Woo has also been affected by the disease, her mother died from breast cancer.

Woo's clients included Kelly Ripa, Miley Cyrus and Jennifer Lopez.

== Awards and Recognitions ==
In 1998 she won the National Women´s Jewelry Association´s design competition.

In 2005 Woo was named as one of Crain´s New York Business´s 40 under 40.

In 2006, Woo was named a Rising Star by the Jeweller's Circular Keystone Show Design Center.
