= Aurelio Desdentado =

Spanish judge (1944–2021)

Aurelio Desdentado Bonete

Judge of the Supreme Court of Spain
- In office 6 March 1986 – 2014

Personal details
- Born: 29 March 1944 Elche, Alicante, Spain
- Died: 19 March 2021 (aged 76) Madrid, Spain
- Education: Autonomous University of Madrid, Charles III University of Madrid
- Occupation: Judge, professor
- Known for: Labor law, rulings in the Supreme Court

Aurelio Desdentado Bonete (29 March 1944 – 19 March 2021) was a Spanish judge, member of the Supreme Court between 1986 and 2014.

== Biography ==
Desdentado was born in Elche, province of Alicante on 29 March 1944 and began his career as a labor lawyer and in the Social Security administration, being also an arbitrator in labor disputes. On 6 March 1986 the General Council of the Judiciary named him judge of the Social Chamber of the Supreme Court, office he held until 2014, when he retired and was succeeded by Sempere Navarro. He was also professor of Labor Law at the Autonomous University of Madrid and the Charles III University of Madrid. In 2013 he received the Order of Saint Raymond of Peñafort.

He had a recognized reputation in the field of labor law, establishing doctrine with his rulings, especially during the last years of the Spanish transition to democracy and in matters such as the creation of non-regular permanent personnel of the Public Administration, the labor contracting of contractors and subcontractors, the right to strike, among others.

He died in Madrid on 19 March 2021 from COVID-19 during the COVID-19 pandemic in Spain at the age of 76.
