= René Taesch =

French photographer, musician, and writer (1952–2021)

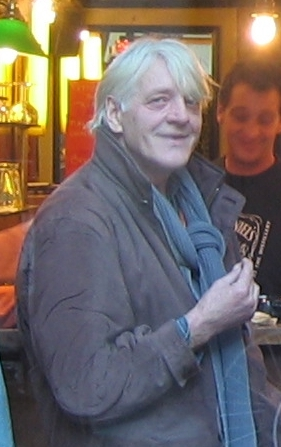
- au Café Mathis, Metz, 2007
- Born: 12 February 1952; Forbach, France
- Died: 9 March 2021 (aged 69); Metz, France
- Occupations: Photographer; Musician; Writer

René Taesch (12 February 1952 – 9 March 2021) was a French photographer, musician, and writer.

== Biographer ==
Taesch grew up in Petite-Rosselle in Lorraine to an impoverished family. He was placed in foster care at the age of 11 and experienced great mistreatment. After several years of factory work and even stints of homelessness, he developed a passion for photography, music, and writing. In 1997, he had a collection titled Portrait de groupe avant démolition published by Stock. The photographs expressed life on the streets and was accompanied by texts by Denis Robert. That same year, he appeared in the documentary Journal intime des affaires en cours by Philippe Harel. In 2007, he published his autobiography, Rue des Singes. In 2014, he exhibited his collection Human Matos at several museums and galleries, particularly the House of Culture and Recreation in Metz.

In addition to his photography, Taesch was a musician, performing the genre known as krautrock alongside the group Dewendel's Dämbe. In 2017, they released a track titled Der Himmel Brennt under the Les Disques de la Face Cachée and Schnitz Production labels.

René Taesch died of cancer in Metz on 9 March 2021 at the age of 69.

== Bibliography ==
- Portrait de groupe avant démolition (1997)
- Rue des singes (2007)

== Discography ==
- La Femme aux trois cerveaux (1995)
- Der Himmel Brennt (2017)
