= Henrique do Rego Almeida =

Brazilian politician (1936–2021)

Henrique do Rego Almeida (16 November 1936 in Curitiba – 22 March 2021 in Curitiba) was a Brazilian businessman and politician.

== Biography ==
He served as a Senator from 1991 to 1999, representing the state of Amapá.
