= Theodoros Margellos =

Greek businessman (died 2021)

- Born: 1952 or 1953; Greece
- Died: 1 March 2021 (aged 68); Greece
- Occupation: Businessman
- Known for: Only Greek to be sanctioned by Russia in the May 2015 war

Theodoros Margellos (Greek: Θεόδωρος Μαργέλλος; 1953 – 1 March 2021) was a Greek businessman. He was the only Greek sanctioned by Russia in May 2015 during the Russo-Ukrainian War.

== Early life and education ==
Theodors Margellos was born in 1953 in Greece and graduated from the University of Lausanne in Switzerland in 1975.

== Career ==
Margellos was a founder and partner of the fund management firm IJ Partners, which managed private funds in Switzerland.

In 1989, he was involved in the Yugoslav corn scandal where corn was relabelled as coming from Greece to be exported into the rest of EEC, but he was later acquitted of the allegation by a jury.

In 2011, Panos Kammenos, a member of parliament for New Democracy at the time, had mentioned his name in the case of the Certificate of deposits of the Postal Savings Bank, which he had categorically denied. The following year, according to the newspaper "To Paron", they claimed him to be his financier party known as "The River".

In May 2015, Margellos was sanctioned by Russia during the Russo-Ukrainian War when he was named on a list of 89 Europeans that President Vladimir Putin considered undesirable in Russia.

== Death ==
He died on 1 March 2021 at the age of 68.
