= Paloma Rodríguez =

Spanish politician (1956–2021)

María Paloma Rodríguez Vázquez (23 May 1956 – 15 March 2021) was a Spanish politician who served as a member of the Congress of Deputies between 2012 and 2015 for the Socialists' Party of Galicia.
