= Leonard Kniffel =

Editor-in-chief of American Libraries (1947–2021)

Leonard Kniffel

Leonard Kniffel (August 25, 1947 – March 19, 2021) was editor-in-chief of American Libraries, the magazine of the American Library Association, from 1996 to 2011 after starting at the magazine in 1988. He was the creator and publisher of the @ your library public awareness website. As part of his role with AL, Kniffel would often interview public figures who attended ALA events. He compiled those interviews into the book Reading with the Stars which contains interviews with Bill Gates, Barack Obama and Garrison Keillor among others.

Kniffel co-produced, with Pamela Goodes, the documentary Loss and Recovery: Librarians Bear Witness to September 11, 2001 about the effect of 9/11 on libraries located in lower Manhattan and how the librarians who worked there have recovered personally and professionally.

Kniffel was born and raised in Michigan. He has master's degrees in English and library science from Wayne State University. He worked as a librarian for 18 years at the Detroit Public Library. He lived in Chicago, Illinois.

== Bibliography ==
- A Polish Son in the Motherland: An American's Journey Home (Texas A&M University Press, 2005) ISBN 1585444200
- Reading with the Stars: A Celebration of Books and Libraries (Skyhorse, 2011) ISBN 1616082771
- Musicals on the Silver Screen: A Guide to the Must-See Movie Musicals (Huron Street Press, 2013) ISBN 1937589307
- Busia: seasons on the farm with my Polish grandmother (Ashland, 2017) ISBN 9780692032947
- Busia: school days on the farm with my Polish grandmother (PolishSon, 2019) ISBN 9780692036624
