= Melissa Kremer =

Dutch author (1996–2021)

- Born: 26 January 1996; Amsterdam, Netherlands
- Died: March 2021 (aged 25); Hoorn, Netherlands
- Known for: Mijn kwaadbloed

Melissa Kremer (26 January 1996 – 22 March 2021) was a Dutch author, who died from acute leukemia. Her book, Mijn kwaadbloed, became a Dutch bestseller. Its presales were unparalleled in popularity.

Melissa Kremer grew up in Hoorn. She received national media attention late 2020 by the way she spoke about having leukemia on her Instagram account. She was in several national television talk shows, including Jinek. She became even more famous after publishing her book My Bad Blood (Dutch: Mijn kwaadbloed) with a selection of stories and poems from her blog. The book was already a bestseller in the pre-sale. After the first print sold out, a second print will be out early April 2021.

The Dutch Police held an event on the central Dam Square in support of Kremer. Kremer died in March 2021, aged 25, from acute leukemia.
