= Halyna Hai =

Ukrainian poet and writer (1956–2021)

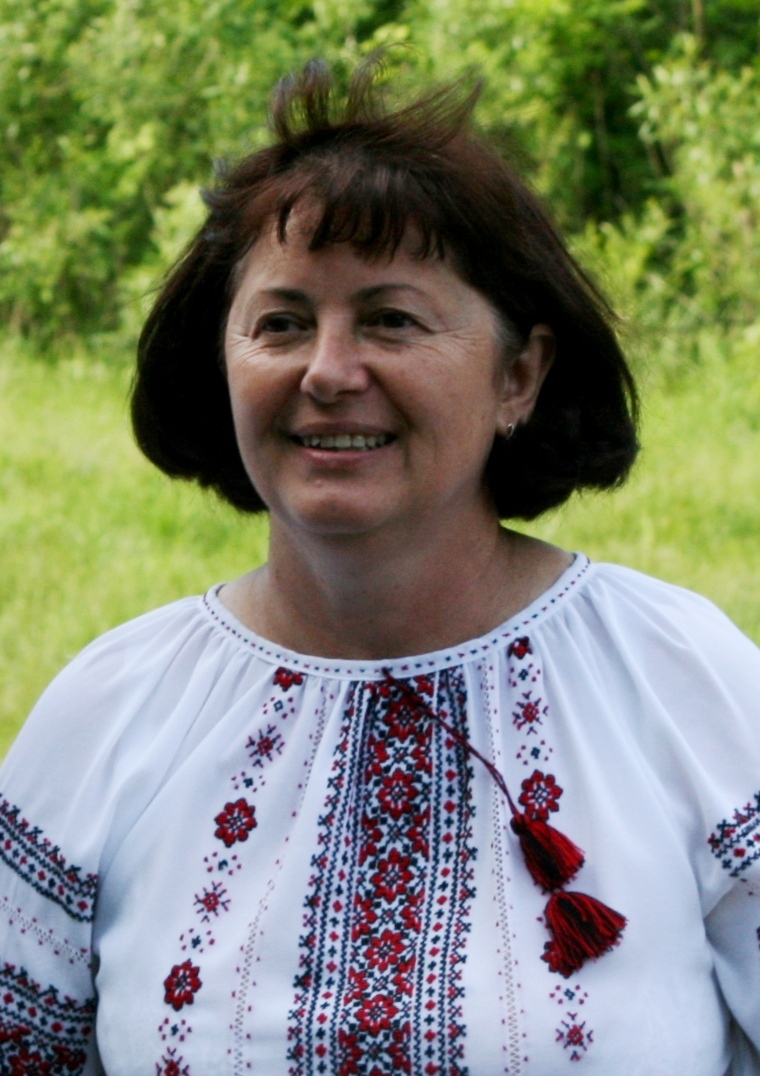
- Born: 3 December 1956; Chyhyryn Raion, Ukraine
- Died: 28 March 2021 (aged 64); Bila Tserkva, Ukraine
- Occupations: Poet, writer

Halyna Hai (Гали́на Семе́нівна Гай; 3 December 1956 – 28 March 2021) was a Ukrainian poet and writer. She worked both as a journalist for the Ukrainian state media and was the long-time editor of the publishing house Bukva based in Bila Tserkva. In 2008, she was the editor-in-chief of the Kyiv regional volume of the National Book of Remembrance for the Victims of the Holodomor of 1932-1933 in Ukraine. for which she was awarded the Order of Merit, 3rd class for "significant contribution to commemoration of the victims of the genocide of the Ukrainian people in connection with the 75th anniversary of the Holodomor 1932-1933 in Ukraine".

== Life ==
Halyna Hai was a Ukrainian poet and writer. She studied at the Institute of Journalism at Taras Shevchenko National University of Kyiv and graduated in 1982. Hai worked both as a journalist for the Ukrainian state media and was the long-time editor of the publishing house Bukva based in Bila Tserkva. In 2008 she was the editor-in-chief of the Kyiv regional volume of the National Book of Remembrance for the Victims of the Holodomor of 1932-1933 in Ukraine. After the publication of the book, Hai and the other authors were awarded the Order of Merit, 3rd class for "significant contribution to commemoration of the victims of the genocide of the Ukrainian people in connection with the 75th anniversary of the Holodomor 1932-1933 in Ukraine".

Hai died on 28 March 2021, aged 64, from COVID-19. Hai's husband Anatoly Ivanovich Hai and their son Yuriy Anatolyovich Hai, are both writers.
