= Zora Plešnar =

Slovenian photographer (1925–2021)

- Born: 30 June 1925; Maribor
- Died: 24 March 2021 (aged 95)
- Occupation: photographer

Zora Plešnar (30 June 1925 – 24 March 2021) was a Slovenian photographer. She received over 100 awards for her works and had numerous exhibitions. She was seen as the most prominent Slovenian photographer of the 1970s and 1980s. Her work is included in the collection of the Modern Gallery, Zagreb.
