= Yuguda Hassan Kila =

Nigerian politician (1951–2021)

Yuguda Hassan Kila (1951 – March 4, 2021) was a Nigerian politician. He was a member of the House of Representatives, representing Gwaram federal constituency of Jigawa State from 2015 to 2021. Until his death, he was the Chairman of the House Committee on Customs.

== Background and political career ==
Yuguda Kila was born in 1951 and hailed from Kila in the Gwaram Local Government Area of the Jigawa State. He was elected as member house of representatives in 2015 and re-elected in 2019.

While in office, he sponsored the following bills:

- Federal Polytechnic, Gwaram (Establishment) Bill, 2018
