= Pedro Nel Gil =

Colombian cyclist (1927–2021)

Personal information
- Nickname: El Tigre de Amalfi
- Born: Pedro Nel Gil Gallego; 21 October 1927; Don Matías, Colombia
- Died: 31 March 2021 (aged 93); Miami, Florida, United States

Pedro Nel Gil (21 October 1927 – 31 March 2021) was a Colombian road cyclist. He finished third in the Vuelta a Colombia in 1951 and 1952.
