= Géza Varga (politician) =

Hungarian politician (1946–2021)

Géza Varga (3 April 1946 – 28 March 2021) was a Hungarian politician who served as an MP.
