= Wilhelm Eliassen =

Norwegian footballer (1935–2021)

Personal information
- Full name: Wilhelm Hedly Eliassen
- Date of birth: 13 August 1935
- Place of birth: Mo i Rana, Norway
- Date of death: 3 March 2021 (aged 85)
- Position: Forward

International career
| Years | Team | Apps | (Gls) |
| 1960 | Norway | 1 | (0) |

Wilhelm Hedly Eliassen (13 August 1935 – 3 March 2021) was a Norwegian footballer. He played in one match for the Norway national football team in 1960.
