= Genésio Goulart =

Brazilian politician (1954–2021)

Member of the Legislative Assembly of Santa Catarina
- In office 1 February 2003 – 1 February 2011

Mayor of Tubarão
- In office 1997–2000

Tubarão Municipal Councillor
- In office 1992–1996

Personal details
- Born: Genésio de Souza Goular; 10 April 1954; Tubarão, Brazil
- Died: 8 March 2021 (aged 66); Tubarão, Brazil
- Political party: PMDB

Genésio Goulart (10 April 1954 – 8 March 2021) was a Brazilian politician.

== Biography ==
Genésio was the son of João Egino and Maria Souza Goulart. He served on the Municipal Council of Tubarão from 1992 to 1996 and subsequently served as the city's mayor from 1997 to 2000. He served on the Legislative Assembly of Santa Catarina from 2003 to 2011.

Genésio Goulart died in Tubarão on 8 March 2021 at the age of 66.
