= Stefano Zuccherini =

Italian politician (1953–2021)

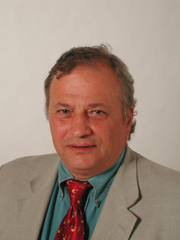
Stefano Zuccherini

Stefano Zuccherini (15 July 1953 – 31 March 2021) was an Italian politician who served as a Senator.
