= Piet Hartman =

Dutch crystallographer (1922–2021)

Piet Hartman (11 April 1922 – 26 March 2021) was a Dutch crystallographer, who worked as professor at Leiden University and Utrecht University between 1973 and 1987.

== Career ==
Hartman was born in Veendam on 11 April 1922. He studied physical chemistry at the University of Groningen. Hartman subsequently obtained his title of doctor under professor P. Terpstra at the same university on 18 December 1953, with a dissertation titled: "Relations between structure and morphology of crystals". He became a lector of crystallography at Leiden University in 1959. In 1973 he was named full professor and he continued to work at Leiden University until 1980. In 1978 he was named professor of crystallography at Utrecht University, where he would work until his retirement in 1987.

Hartman was elected a member of the Royal Netherlands Academy of Arts and Sciences in 1982. He died on 26 March 2021, shortly before his 99th birthday.
