= María de Jesús Velarde =

Spanish nun (1925–2021)

- Born: Cristina Ana María Velarde Gil; 9 April 1925; Santander, Spain, Spain
- Died: 9 March 2021 (aged 95); Galapagar, Spain
- Occupation: nun

María de Jesús Velarde (9 April 1925 – 9 March 2021) was a Spanish nun. She was the founder of the religious institute "Hijas de Santa María del Corazón de Jesús".

She was born as Cristina Ana María Velarde Gil in Santander to a wealthy and deeply religious family. Her parents, Calixto Velarde Gómez and Prudencia Gil de Lamadrid, had four children, the youngest of whom was María de Jesús.

The family moved to Madrid (1932-1937) and later to Barcelona, where Cristina Ana María studied the Bachillerato, and graduated at the age of twenty-six from the Faculty of Philosophy and Letters at the University of Barcelona, obtaining the Extraordinary Prize (6 June 1951).

She began her novitiate in the Congregation of the Daughters of Our Lady of the Sacred Heart in Sant Cugat del Vallés. She arrived at the novitiate at the age of twenty-six, and there she made temporary profession on 25 August 1953, taking the religious name of Sister Maria de Jesus. Three years later she took her perpetual vows.

María de Jesús Velarde died in Galapagar on 9 March 2021, aged 95.
