= Eugene Hughes (educator) =

American educator (1934–2021)

Eugene M. Hughes (April 3, 1934 – March 10, 2021) was an American educator who was the president of Northern Arizona University from 1979 to 1993 and the president of Wichita State University from 1993 to 1998.
