= Max Morton =

British-born Belgian painter (1943–2021)

- Born: 3 January 1943; Liverpool, United Kingdom
- Died: 1 March 2021 (aged 78); Schaerbeek, Belgium
- Occupation: Painter

Max Morton (3 January 1943, Liverpool – 1 March 2021, Schaerbeek) was a British-born Belgian painter.

== Biography ==
Morton left the United Kingdom at the age of two and joined his parents in Chile, Peru, and Argentina, where he lived throughout his youth. At a young age, he became interested in painting, particularly traditional, Pre-Columbian art. He created personal colours and pigments using natural or old colours. In his spare time, he was also a poet and philosopher, which influenced his paintings in the sense that he reflected his beliefs of luminosity on his dreamlike scenery. He blended Native American cultures, abstract art, impressionism, expressionism, and Fauvism. The protests of May 68 inspired him to begin exhibiting in Paris five years later. Many exhibitions followed in France, Morocco, Spain, Australia, and Belgium. He spent most of his career living in Schaerbeek, near Brussels.

Morton died in Schaerbeek on 1 March 2021, at the age of 78.
