= Nguyễn Huy Thiệp =

Vietnamese writer (1950–2021)

Nguyễn Huy Thiệp (Hanoi, 29 April 1950 – 20 March 2021) was a Vietnamese writer. He has been described as Vietnam's most influential writer. In 1992, before Bảo Ninh (1993) and Dương Thu Hương (1996), he was the first to write a major novel taking the gloss off the "American War" experience.

== Works ==
- “Muối của rừng” (The Salt of the Jungle)

In 1987 “The Winds of Hua Tat” appeared in Van nghe, a weekly edition of the Vietnamese Writers Association. “The Winds of Hua Tat” was a book of 10 short stories, all of them displaying the real-life society of socialism in Vietnam. Then, in 1988 Van nghe, published three historical short stories, “Sharp Sword”, “Fired Gold” and “Pham tiet” and “Chastity.” All three of these stories used prominent figures in Vietnam’s history to question the previous Marxist leaders. “Fired Gold” is based on the Vietnamese emperor from 1802-1820 Gia Long, who Huy Thiep blames in the story of losing Vietnam to the French.
