= Xabier Markiegi =

Spanish politician (1938–2021)

Xabier Markiegi Candina
- Born: 30 December 1938; Bilbao, Spain
- Died: 28 March 2021 (aged 82); Aguadulce, Spain
- Occupations: Politician; civil servant

Xabier Markiegi Candina (30 December 1938 – 28 March 2021) was a Spanish politician, born in Bilbao. He was a member of the Basque Parliament from 1981 to 1994, and served as Ararteko (Ombudsman), of the Basque Country between 1995 and 2000. He participated in the 1980s' negotiations to reach the dissolution of ETA terrorist group.

Markiegi died in Aguadulce on Sunday, 28 March 2021.

== Selected works ==
- Orientación profesional. Colección escuela para padres. Barcelona: Editorial RM. 1973. ISBN 9788472040144. OCLC 10216255.
- Orientación familiar. Colección escuela para padres. Barcelona: Editorial RM. 1973. ISBN 9788472040151. OCLC 8462072.
