= Orest Kryvoruchko =

Ukrainian artist (1942–2021)

Orest Kryvoruchko (Ukrainian: Орест Іва́нович Кривору́чко; 9 May 1942 – 26 March 2021) was a Ukrainian artist. He was awarded Honored Artist of Ukraine in 2005.
