= Roger Maes =

Belgian volleyball player (1943–2021)

Personal information
- Nationality: Belgian
- Born: 4 July 1943; Ghent, Belgium
- Died: 13 March 2021 (aged 77); Ghent, Belgium

Sport
- Sport: Volleyball

Roger Maes (4 July 1943 – 13 March 2021) was a Belgian volleyball player. He competed in the men's tournament at the 1968 Summer Olympics. He played at four world championships. For the Belgian national team he played more than 200 international matches. Maes became four times Belgian volleyball player of the year (1971, 1972, 1974, 1979). He also worked as a firefighter.
