= 2021 in Brazil =

Events in the year 2021 in Brazil.

== Incumbents ==
=== Federal government ===
- President: Jair Bolsonaro
- Vice President: Hamilton Mourão

=== Governors ===
- Acre: Gladson Cameli
- Alagoas: Renan Filho
- Amapa: Waldez Góes
- Amazonas: Wilson Lima
- Bahia: Rui Costa
- Ceará: Camilo Santana
- Espírito Santo: Renato Casagrande
- Goiás: Ronaldo Caiado
- Maranhão: Flávio Dino
- Mato Grosso: Mauro Mendes
- Mato Grosso do Sul: Reinaldo Azambuja
- Minas Gerais: Romeu Zema
- Pará: Helder Barbalho
- Paraíba: João Azevêdo
- Paraná: Ratinho Júnior
- Pernambuco: Paulo Câmara
- Piauí: Wellington Dias
- Rio de Janeiro:
  - Wilson Witzel (until 30 April)
  - Cláudio Castro (from 30 April)
- Rio Grande do Norte: Fátima Bezerra
- Rio Grande do Sul: Eduardo Leite
- Rondônia: Marcos Rocha
- Roraima: Antonio Denarium
- Santa Catarina: Carlos Moisés
- São Paulo: João Doria
- Sergipe: Belivaldo Chagas
- Tocantins: Mauro Carlesse

=== Vice governors ===
- Acre: Wherles Fernandes da Rocha
- Alagoas: José Luciano Barbosa da Silva
- Amapá: Jaime Domingues Nunes
- Amazonas: Carlos Alberto Souza de Almeida Filho
- Bahia: João Leão
- Ceará: Izolda Cela
- Espírito Santo: Jacqueline Moraes da Silva
- Goiás: Lincoln Graziane Pereira da Rocha
- Maranhão: Carlos Brandão
- Mato Grosso: Otaviano Pivetta
- Mato Grosso do Sul: Murilo Zauith
- Minas Gerais: Paulo Brant
- Pará:
  - Lúcio Dutra Vale (until 26 April)
  - Vacant (from 26 April)
- Paraíba: Lígia Feliciano
- Paraná: Darci Piana
- Pernambuco: Luciana Barbosa de Oliveira Santos
- Piaui: Regina Sousa
- Rio de Janeiro:
  - Cláudio Castro (until 30 April)
  - Vacant (from 30 April)
- Rio Grande do Norte: Antenor Roberto
- Rio Grande do Sul: Ranolfo Vieira Júnior
- Rondônia: José Atílio Salazar Martins
- Roraima: Frutuoso Lins Cavalcante Neto
- Santa Catarina: Daniela Cristina Reinehr
- São Paulo: Rodrigo Garcia
- Sergipe: Eliane Aquino Custódio
- Tocantins: Wanderlei Barbosa

== Events ==
=== January ===
- January 1: Mayors and councilors elected in 2020 take office in more than 5,000 Brazilian municipalities. Due to the COVID-19 pandemic, most of the ceremonies were broadcast without guests.
- January 6: The first case of the Gamma Variant of SARS-CoV-2, also known as the Manaus variant, is detected in four people who arrived in Tokyo after visiting the Amazonas region of Brazil four days prior.
- January 7: The São Paulo state government and the Butantan Institute release the calendar of the State Immunization Plan against COVID-19. The chronogram, to start on January 25, initially serves some risk groups: health professionals, indigenous people, quilombolas, and individuals aged between 60 and 75 years or older.
- January 12: Ford Motor Company announces it is closing three plants and laying off 5,000 workers in Brazil.
- January 17: The Brazilian Health Regulatory Agency (Anvisa) unanimously approves requests for the emergency use of the vaccines CoronaVac (produced by the Butantan Institute in partnership with the Chinese laboratory Sinovac) and AstraZeneca (produced by the University of Oxford with Fiocruz). A nurse named Mônica Calazans, an employee of the Emílio Ribas Institute of Infectious Diseases, receives the first dose of CoronaVac in the country.
- January 21:
  - Tendencias Consultoria, a consultant company focused on the economy, warns of food shortages in isolated areas, particularly in the favelas and quilombos, as the government ends emergency aid.
  - Rio de Janeiro Mayor Eduardo Paes announces via social media, the cancellation of the 2021 Carnival in Rio de Janeiro due to the coronavirus pandemic. Paes justified it, stating that holding the festivities requires great preparation on the part of public bodies, groups, and institutions linked to samba and that it's impossible to do at this time. In another statement, the Independent League of Samba Schools of Rio de Janeiro agreed with the decision and clarified that the samba school parades in Marquês de Sapucaí, which is postponed until the month of July, would only be held with the arrival of the vaccine and release from authorities.
- January 24: A small plane carrying some part of the Palmas Futebol e Regatas delegation crashes shortly after takeoff in Palmas, Tocantins, killing four footballers, the club's president, and the pilot.
- January 26: The Supreme Federal Court approves an investigation into the government's handling of the pandemic in Manaus.
- January 28: 400 religious leaders, including Catholics, Anglicans, Lutherans, Presbyterians, and Methodists, demand the impeachment of President Bolsonaro for mismanagement of the pandemic. There are another 60 such demands pending in the Chamber of Deputies.

=== February ===
- February 1:
  - Operation Car Wash ends with 174 convictions in Brazil, 12 current or former presidents implicated across Latin America, and $790 million returned to Brazil's public coffers, with nearly $2.8 billion more on the way.
  - Rodrigo Pacheco (DEM/ MG) is elected president of the Federal Senate.
  - Arthur Lira (PP/ AL) is elected president of the Chamber of Deputies.
- February 2: The 5-year old Ana Clara Machado is killed in a police violence incident.
- February 4: Vale S.A. agrees to pay 37.7 billion reals ($7.03 billion) to settle the January 2019 Brumadinho dam disaster, where 270 people died.
- February 10: The traditional Carnival in Rio de Janeiro is canceled with strict warnings against clandestine celebrations.
- February 12: São Paulo City Hall announces the cancellation of the 2021 carnival in the city, due to the coronavirus pandemic. Celebrations are initially postponed to take place between May and July.
- February 16: Federal deputy Daniel Silveira (PSL/RJ) is arrested, by decision of Minister of Justice Alexandre de Moraes, after publishing a video on social media insulting and threatening court ministers.
- February 19:
  - President Bolsonaro prevents a truckers′ strike by agreeing to a two-month delay on federal tariffs on diesel fuel.
  - The last male member of the Juma people dies of COVID-19.
- February 20: Three videos broadcast by Telemundo, show elderly people in Petrópolis and Niterói, Rio de Janeiro, being injected by empty syringes rather than with the COVID-19 vaccine.
- February 22: Stock prices of Petrobras fall 21%, as investors worry that the appointment of General Joaquim Silva e Luna as head of the company means that economic decisions will be made based on politics.
- February 25: The Health Minister admits he mistakenly sent 76,000 doses of COVID-19 vaccines destined for Amazonas state (population 4,000,000) to Amapá municipality (population 9,000). The two places are 1,612 km (1,002 mi) apart.
- February 26: The death toll in Brazil, due to the COVID-19 pandemic surpasses 250,000; second-highest in the world.

=== March ===
- March 2: The number of COVID-19 deaths in a single day reaches a new high of 1,641.
- March 4: The World Bank and the International Monetary Fund (IMF) estimate that the Brazilian economy shrank by 4.1% in 2020, less than original estimates of 8%-9%. This would be the worst performance in decades.
- March 8:
  - A child named Henry Borel is murdered in Barra da Tijuca, inside the apartment of his mother Monique Medeiros and his stepfather Jairo Souza, a councilor and doctor. Both are suspected of having caused his death.
  - Edson Fachin, a judge from the Brazilian Supreme Court, nullifies all convictions of former president (2003-2010) Luiz Inácio Lula da Silva, in relation to Operation Car Wash. This restores his civil rights and making it possible for him to run for president in 2022.
- March 10: The number of COVID-19 deaths in a single day reaches a new high of 2,349.
- March 15:
  - The Ministry of Health confirms the purchase of 138 million doses of the Sputnik, Pfizer and Janssen vaccines by the end of the year to combat COVID-19.
  - President Jair Bolsonaro changes health minister for the fourth time, as cardiologist Marcelo Queiroga replaces Eduardo Pazuello in office.
- March 15-30: São Paulo suspends all religious and sporting activities, as the health services are overwhelmed with COVID-19 cases.
- March 16: A new record of 24-hour COVID-19 deaths is recorded in the country, with 2,340.
- March 23:
  - Brazil records 3,251 deaths from COVID-19 in 24 hours, a new record.
  - Marcelo Queiroga becomes the fourth Health Minister in the last year.
  - The Second Panel of the STF decides, by 3 votes to 2, that former judge Sergio Moro acted partially when convicting former president Luiz Inácio Lula da Silva in the case of the Guarujá triplex.
- March 24: Brazil surpasses the mark of 300,000 deaths caused by the COVID-19 pandemic.
- March 26:
  - Brazil once again breaks its own record and records 3,600 deaths from COVID-19 in 24 hours.
  - In an interview with Der Spiegel, former president Lula calls the COVID-19 pandemic the “biggest genocide” in Brazil's history.
- March 29
  - According to the Minister of Communications, six ministers are relieved of their jobs, including Foreign Relations (Ernesto Araújo), Defense (Fernando Azevedo e Silva), Justice and Public Security (André Mendonça), Chief of Staff (Walter Souza Braga Netto), and Attorney General (José Levi do Amaral).
  - According to reports from O Globo and Folha de S.Paulo, military commanders Edson Leal Pujol (army), Ilques Barbosa Junior (navy), and Antonio Carlos Moretti Bermudez (air force) meet to discuss their possible resignations.
- March 30: In a move considered unprecedented, following the dismissal of Defense Minister Fernando Azevedo e Silva the previous day, President Jair Bolsonaro precedes the resignation requests and dismisses the three heads of the Brazilian Armed Forces: Edson Leal Pujol (Army), Antonio Carlos Moretti Bermudez (Airforce), and Ilques Barbosa Junior (Navy).

=== April ===
- April 1: Grupo Globo announces the sale of the Som Livre label to Sony Music Entertainment for $255 million USD.
- April 13: The Federal Senate opens a CPI (Comissão Parlamentar de Inquérito) to investigate federal government spending and omissions in relation to the coronavirus pandemic.
- April 20: Subtropical storm Potira forms.
- April 27: The COVID-19 CPI (Comissão Parlamentar de Inquérito) is officially installed in the Federal Senate, with the objective of investigating alleged omissions and irregularities in the Brazilian federal government's expenditures during the COVID-19 pandemic in Brazil.
- April 29: Brazil reaches the 400,000 mark of deaths from COVID-19.
- April 30: The impeachment of Rio de Janeiro governor Wilson Witzel is unanimously approved, after being accused of irregularities in the hiring of field hospitals to combat the coronavirus pandemic . The former judge will have his political rights suspended for 5 years and the acting governor, Cláudio Castro, will take over the position permanently.

=== May ===
- May 4: An 18-year-old man armed with a knife and dagger, invades a daycare center in the municipality of Saudades (SC); killing three children and two teachers.
- May 6: An operation against drug trafficking by the Civil Police leaves at least 28 dead and 2 injured in the Jacarezinho neighborhood, in Rio de Janeiro.
- May 28: The Ministry of Health authorizes vaccination against COVID-19 for people over the age of 18 across the country.
- May 29: Protests against the Bolsonaro administration take place in various parts of the country. There is also a record of a protests by Brazilian citizens in Paris.
- May 31: CONMEBOL announces that the 2021 Copa America will be hosted in Brazil.

=== June ===
- June 9:
  - Protests break out in Lins de Vasconcelos after Afro-Brazilian influencer Kathlen Romeu is killed by a stray bullet in a police shootout.
  - A manhunt begins for serial killer Lázaro Barbosa, who killed a family in the rural area of Ceilândia, in the Federal District. The task force brought together around 200 men from the Civil Police, Military Police, Federal Highway Police, and the Military Firefighters Corps.
- June 11:
  - Deforestation in the Amazon rainforest increases by 67%. President Bolsonaro has not followed through on his April pledge to boost funding for environmental enforcement.
  - During the 2021 United Nations Security Council Elections, Brazil is elected to a two-year term as a non-permanent member of the UN Security Council, starting in 2022. It will mark the eleventh time Brazil has sat on the Security Council.
- June 23: Ricardo Salles leaves the Ministry of Environment. President Jair Bolsonaro nominates Joaquim Alvaro Pereira Leite to replace him.
- June 28: After 20 days of searching, serial killer Lázaro Barbosa was arrested in Goiás after being shot by police. He was then taken by ambulance by police, but ended up dying shortly.
- June 30: A severe cold wave hits Brazil. The phenomenon is caused by a polar vortex, an extratropical cyclone, and the subtropical storm Raoni. Subsequently, 13 people die as a result of the weather event.

=== July ===
- July 14: President Jair Bolsonaro is diagnosed with an intestinal obstruction and is hospitalized in Brasília. Hours later he was transferred to São Paulo to undergo further tests.
- July 29: A fire breaks out in a warehouse at the Cinemateca Brasileira in São Paulo.
- July 31: After being closed for almost six years for renovation, the Museum of the Portuguese Language reopens in São Paulo. The place suffered a fire in 2015, which destroyed part of the building.

=== August ===
- August 12: The Lower House of the Brazilian Congress vote to expel fellow lawmaker Flordelis de Souza. This is after she is charged with first degree murder in relation to the 2019 murder case of her husband Anderson do Carmo.
- August 13: Former deputies Roberto Jefferson and Flordelis are arrested in Rio de Janeiro. Jefferson is accused by the Supreme Federal Court of inciting violence, whereas Flordelis, is accused by the Public Ministry of Rio de Janeiro of murdering her husband, pastor Anderson do Carmo.
- August 30: At least 20 heavily armed bandits cause a series of crimes during the early hours of the morning in Araçatuba, São Paulo. The criminals burned vehicles, blew up three banks, used hostages as human shields, and exchanged fire with police for more than two hours. Two people are killed and at least six are injured.
- August 31: RedeTV! employees decide to go on strike, due to a lack of salary adjustment, which hasn't happened since 2018.

=== September ===
- September 6: A small group of pro-Bolsonaro protesters attempt to invade an area blocked by the Military Police at the Praça dos Três Poderes in Brasília.
- September 7: Protests across Brazil against and in favor of the Bolsonaro administration occur.
- September 14: Seven people die after a small plane crashes in Piracicaba, São Paulo. Among the victims are businessman Celso Silveira Mello Filho, his wife, and the couple's three children. The pilot and co-pilot are also among the victims.

=== October ===
- October 6: The creation of União Brasil is announced, a political party formed through the merger between the Democrats (DEM) and the Social Liberal Party (PSL).

=== November ===
- November 5: A small plane crashes near a waterfall in Piedade de Caratinga, located in the interior of Minas Gerais; kills five people, including singer Marília Mendonça.
- November 6: Over a thousand buffalo are found abandoned on a farm in Brotas, São Paulo, resulting in one of the largest animal abuse cases in Brazil's history.
- November 17:
  - A fire hits areas of vegetation in Parque do Cocó in Fortaleza, Ceará.
  - A three-story house collapses in Morro do Salgueiro, North Zone of Rio de Janeiro, killing one person and injuring three others.
- November 22: A BOPE police operation in Complexo do Salgueiro in São Gonçalo, Rio de Janeiro, leaves nine dead.

=== December ===
- December 1:
  - André Mendonça becomes the first Evangelical Christian positioned to join the Supreme Federal Court, after the Senate approves in a vote of 47-32.
  - Almost nine years later, the trial begins for those accused of the tragedy at the Kiss nightclub, which left 242 victims. Among the accused are the nightclub owners Elissandro Spohr and Mauro Hoffmann; and members of the band who played the night of the incident, musician Marcelo de Jesus dos Santos and producer Luciano Bonilha.
- December 7: Heavy rains cause flooding in municipalities in southern Bahia, where thousands of people are left homeless. Fatalities and disappearances are also being recorded. The state government has declared a state of emergency in dozens of municipalities.
- December 24: A bus accident on BR-153, in Aparecida de Goiânia, kills six people and injures 40. The vehicle fell into a stream, after hitting a car and truck on the highway.
- December 25: Heavy rain once again causes flooding in at least 19 municipalities in Bahia.

== Culture ==
=== January ===
- January 1 - The musical duo Anavitória releases their fourth studio album, Cor.
- January 7 - Debut of the TV show Zeca Pelo Brasil on Rede Bandeirantes.
- January 11 - Disney Latin America decides to cancel all programs of Fox Sports channels in Brazil. The programming grid is now composed only of live or replayed sporting events.
- January 15 - Premiere of the movie Double Dad on Netflix.
- January 17 – The first season of the reality show The Voice + begins on Globo.
- January 19 – Debut of Gênesis telenovela on RecordTV.
- January 20 - Debut of the TV show A Noite É Nossa on RecordTV.
- January 22 - Premiere of the game show Nickelodeon Além do Filtro on Nickelodeon.
- January 25 -
  - 467th anniversary of São Paulo.
  - The twenty-first season of the popular reality show Big Brother Brasil begins on Globo.
- January 29 -
  - Selena Gomez launches the video for the song Baila Conmigo, recorded on a beach in the municipality of Icapuí, Ceará, and directed by the Brazilian Fernando Nogari.
  - Globo postpones the telenovela Nos Tempos do Imperador again and announces a replay of The Life We Lead to replace it.

=== February ===
- February 5 - Premiere of the TV series Invisible City on Netflix.
- February 8 - Premiere of the fifth season of the TV show Conversa com Bial on Globo.
- February 13-14 - Because of the cancellation of carnival, Globo shows the special Desfile Nº 1 Brahma, replaying each 14 day parades of samba schools anthological of the carnival of São Paulo and of the carnival of Rio de Janeiro.
- February 19 - Singer Thiaguinho releases his new album Infinito 2021, Vol. 1.
- February 20 - Debut of the reality show Bake Off Celebridades on SBT.
- February 23 - Premiere of the documentary Pelé on Netflix.

=== March ===
- March 1 - 456th anniversary of Rio de Janeiro.
- March 4 -
  - The worsening of the pandemic of COVID-19 causes the ninth edition of the music festival Rock in Rio to be postponed to 2022.
  - Globo postpones the telenovela Um Lugar ao Sol again and announces a replay of Empire to replace it.
- March 5 - Premiere of the TV program Dani-se on GNT.
- March 8 -
  - Globo shows the TV special Falas Femininas.
  - Premiere of the TV series Filhas de Eva on Globoplay.
- March 12 - DJ Bruno Martini releases his debut album, Original.
- March 13 - Rapper Djonga releases his fourth studio album, Nu.
- March 15 - The final episode of the telenovela A Mother's Love is shown on Globo.
- March 18 - Premiere of the movie Get the Goat on Netflix.
- March 22 - Premiere of the TV program Vem Pra Cá at SBT.
- March 23 - With the worsening of the COVID-19 pandemic in the country, Globo once again interrupts the production of its dramaturgical works at Estúdios Globo.
- March 24 -
  - Premiere of the talk show Posso Explicar at National Geographic.
  - TV Cultura shows the TV special Nicette em 3 Atos, in honor of actress Nicette Bruno.
- March 30 — Premiere of the third season of the reality Pesadelo na Cozinha at Bandeirantes.

=== April ===
- April 15 – At the Latin America Music Awards, Anitta wins in the Favorite Artist - Female category.
- April 19 – Globo shows the TV special Falas da Terra.
- April 24 – Premiere of the reality show Mestres da Sabotagem at SBT.
- April 25 – Premiere of the third season from the reality show Canta Comigo on RecordTV.
- April 27 – Second season premiere of the TV show Minha Receita at Bandeirantes.
- April 28 -
  - Launch of Te Amo Lá Fora, second studio album by singer Duda Beat.
  - Lollapalooza Brazil is postponed again to the days March 25, 26 and 27, 2022.
  - Premiere of the film Os Salafrários on Netflix.
- April 29 – Premiere of the documentary about singer and former Big Brother Brasil participant Karol Conká, A Vida Depois do Tombo on Globoplay.

=== May ===
- May 4 -
  - Premiere of the TV series Onde Está Meu Coração on Globoplay.
  - Globo changes the night program schedule and re-displays 220 Volts Especial de Fim de Ano in honor of comedian Paulo Gustavo, who died of complications from COVID-19 that same night.
  - With 90.15% of the votes, makeup artist and lawyer Juliette Freire is the winner of the 21st edition of the popular reality show Big Brother Brasil.
- May 8 — Globo shows the TV special BBB - Dia 101.
- May 9 — Premiere of the fifth season of the reality show Power Couple Brasil on RecordTV.
- May 11 -
  - Multishow broadcasts live the seventh day mass in memory of actor Paulo Gustavo, held at Cristo Redentor, in Rio de Janeiro.
  - Premiere of the fifth season of the reality show No Limite on Globo.
- May 13 -
  - Rádio Itatiaia is sold to businessman Rubens Menin.
  - Premiere of O Caso Evandro, documentary about the murder of the boy Evandro, on Globoplay.
- May 17 — The telenovela Salve-se Quem Puder is shown again on Globo.
- May 19 – As a result of the COVID-19 pandemic, Globo postpones the premiere of the telenovela Quanto Mais Vida Melhor.
- May 20 — Launch of Passado & Presente, posthumous album by singer MC Kevin.
- May 24 — Because of the postponement of Quanto Mais Vida Melhor, Globo announces a repeat of the telenovela The Big Catch.

== Sports ==
- March 9 – The Rio de Janeiro state legislature votes to change the name of Maracanã Stadium (officially ″Estádio Jornalista Mário Filho″) to ″Edson Arantes do Nascimento – Estádio Rei Pelé″ (Rei is ″king″ in English), pending approval by the governor.

== Deaths ==
=== January ===
- January 1: Cleonâncio Fonseca, 84, politician, Deputy (1987–2007).
- January 2: Cléber Eduardo Arado, 48, footballer (Kyoto Purple Sanga, Coritiba); COVID-19.
- January 5:
  - Bonifácio José Tamm de Andrada, 90, professor, lawyer and politician, Deputy (1979–2019), complications from COVID-19.
  - Brandãozinho, 90, footballer.
- January 7: Genival Lacerda, 89, forró singer; COVID-19.
- January 13:
  - Eusébio Scheid, 88, Roman Catholic cardinal, Archbishop of Roman Catholic Archdiocese of São Sebastião do Rio de Janeiro (2001–2009); COVID-19.
  - Maguito Vilela, 71, mayor (Movimento Democrático Brasileiro) of Goiânia, Goiás; lung failure related to COVID-19.
- January 19: José Alves, 86, footballer (Botafogo, Corinthians, América).
- January 24:
  - Marcus Molinari, 23, footballer (Tupi, Ipatinga, Tupynambás) aviation accident.
  - Lucas Meira, 32, football executive, president of Palmas Futebol e Regatas, aviation accident.
  - Guilherme Noé, 28, footballer (Batatais, Rio Preto, Ipatinga), aviation accident.
  - Ranule, 27, footballer (Atlético Itapemirim, Democrata, Resende), aviation accident.
- January 29: Roberto Fernando Frojuelo, 83, footballer (São Paulo, River Plate, Colo-Colo).

=== February ===
- February 2: Vera Nunes, 92, actress.
- February 3: Nilson Borges, 79, footballer (Portuguesa-SP, Atlético Paranaense).
- February 6:
  - Zezinho Corrêa, 69, singer.
  - Afonso Fioreze, 78, Coadjutor Bishop (2003–2004) and Bishop (2004–2017) of Roman Catholic Diocese of Luziânia.
- February 9:
  - Ivan Izquierdo, 83, Argentine-born Brazilian neurobiologist; COVID-19.
  - José Maranhão, 87, politician, Deputy (1983–1994), Senator (2003–2009, since 2015) and Governor of Paraíba (1995–2002, 2009–2011); COVID-19.
- February 22: Laurindo Guizzardi, 86, Bishop of Roman Catholic Diocese of Bagé (1982–2001) and Roman Catholic Diocese of Foz do Iguaçu (2001–2010).

=== March ===
- March 3:
  - Sérgio Eduardo Castriani, 66, archbishop of Roman Catholic Archdiocese of Manaus (2012–2019); sepsis.
  - Ruy Scarpino, 59, football manager (Imperatriz, Ceará, Ituano); COVID-19.
- March 5: José Carlos da Silva Júnior, 94, businessman and politician, Senate of Brazil (1996–1999) and vice-governor of Paraíba (1983–1986); COVID-19.
- March 7: Fabio Brunelli, 51, news anchor, journalist and writer; cancer.
- March 9:
  - Léo Rosa, 37, actor (Vidas Opostas); testicular cancer.
  - Adhemar Santillo, 81, politician, deputy (1975–1986) and mayor of Anápolis (1986–1989, 1997–2001); pulmonary embolism from COVID-19.
- March 10: Hélio Fernandes, 100, journalist.
- March 11: Mauro Aparecido dos Santos, 66, archbishop of Roman Catholic Archdiocese of Cascavel (since 2007); COVID-19.
- March 12: Ademar Frederico Duwe, 82, politician, Santa Catarina MLA (1987–1991).
- March 13: Silvio Favero, 54, politician and lawyer, Mato Grosso MLA (since 2019); COVID-19.
- March 16: Gilmar Fubá, 45, footballer (Corinthians); bone marrow cancer.
- March 17: Helenês Cândido, 86, politician and lawyer, governor of Goiás (1998–1999); COVID-19.
- March 18:
  - Herzem Gusmão Pereira, 72, politician and journalist, mayor of Vitória da Conquista (since 2017) and Bahia MLA (2015–2016); COVID-19.
  - Major Olímpio, 58, politician, senator (since 2019), deputy (2015–2019) and São Paulo MLA (2007–2015); COVID-19.
- March 19: Irmão Lázaro, 54, councilman, gospel singer and former member of Olodum; COVID-19.
- March 24:
  - Aécio de Borba, 89, politician, deputy (1983–1995, 1997–1998) and member of the Constituent Assembly; cardiac arrest.
  - Haroldo Lima, 81, politician and anti-dictatorship activist, general director of the ANP (2005–2011) and deputy (1983–2003); COVID-19.
- March 27:
  - Odirlei Pessoni, 38, Olympic bobsledder (2014, 2018); traffic collision.
  - Paulo Stein, 73, journalist and sports announcer; COVID-19.
- March 30: Contardo Calligaris, 72, psychoanalyst, writer and columnist for the newspaper Folha de S. Paulo; Cancer.
- March 31: Carlos Pedro Zilli, 66, Brazilian-born Bissau-Guinean Roman Catholic prelate, bishop of Roman Catholic Diocese of Bafatá (since 2001); COVID-19.

=== April ===
- April 2: Jean Luc Rosat, 67, Olympic volleyball player (1976, 1980), complications from COVID-19.
- April 3:
  - José Adauto Bezerra, 94, former governor of the state of Ceará (1975-1978); COVID-19.
  - Agnaldo Timóteo, 84, singer, composer and politician; COVID-19.
- April 5: Robert de Almendra Freitas, 73, doctor and politician, mayor of José de Freitas (2005–2010) and Piauí MLA (1987–2003); COVID-19.
- April 6: Firmino Filho, 57, economist and academic, mayor of Teresina (1997–2004, 2013–2020) and Piauí MLA (2011–2012).
- April 7: Alfredo Bosi, 84, literary critic, member of the Brazilian Academy of Letters; COVID-19.
- April 8: Roseli Machado, 52, Olympic long-distance runner (1996); COVID-19.
- April 9:
  - Abdul Hamid Sebba, 86, lawyer and politician, Goiás MLA (1995–2003); COVID-19.
  - Rubens Recalcatti, 72, politician and lawyer.
- April 20: Ana Lúcia Menezes, 46, actress, voice actor (Alice in Wonderland, Pretty Little Liars) and dubbing director; Stroke.
- April 23: Levy Fidelix, 69, politician, founder and president of PRTB (Partido Renovador Trabalhista Brasileiro); COVID-19.

=== May ===
- May 4: Paulo Gustavo (Vai Que Cola, Minha Mãe é uma Peça), 42, actor and comedian; COVID-19.
- May 7: Cassiano, 77, singer and composer; COVID-19.
- May 15: Eva Wilma (Mulheres de Areia, A Indomada), 87, actress; Cancer.
- May 16: Bruno Covas, 41, mayor of São Paulo; Cancer.
- May 17: MC Kevin, 23, singer.
- May 23: Paulo Mendes da Rocha, 92, architect; Lung cancer.

=== July ===
- July 27: Orlando Drummond, 101, actor, voice actor and comedian (Escolinha do Professor Raimundo, Scooby-Doo); multiple organ failure

=== September ===
- September 1: José Gonçalves Heleno, 93, Roman Catholic prelate, coadjutor bishop (1976–1977) and bishop of Governador Valadares (1977–2001)
- September 24: Ota, 67, cartoonist.
- September 26: José Freire Falcão, 95, Roman Catholic cardinal, bishop of Limoeiro do Norte (1967–1971), archbishop of Teresina (1971–1984) and Brasília (1984–2004), COVID-19.

=== November ===
- November 5: Marília Mendonça, 26, singer and songwriter, Grammy winner (2019), airplane crash.

== See also ==
- COVID-19 pandemic in South America
- Mercosur
- Organization of American States
- Organization of Ibero-American States
- Community of Portuguese Language Countries
