= 2021 in South America =

The following lists events that happened during 2021 in South America.

== Incumbents ==
=== Argentina ===
(Argentina)

- President: Alberto Fernández (2019–2022)
- Vice President: Cristina Fernández de Kirchner (2019–2023)

Argentina claims sovereignty over part of Antarctica, the Islas Malvinas, and South Georgia and the South Sandwich Islands.

=== Bolivia ===
(Bolivia)

- President: Luis Arce (2020–2025)
- Vice President: David Choquehuanca (2020–2025)

=== Brazil ===
(Brazil)

- President: Jair Bolsonaro (2019–2023)
- Vice President: Hamilton Mourão (2019–2023)

=== Chile ===
(Chile)

- President: Sebastián Piñera (2018–2022)
- President of the Senate: Adriana Muñoz D'Albora (2020–2021); Yasna Provoste (2021); Ximena Rincón (2021–2022)
- President of the Chamber of Deputies: Diego Paulsen (2020–2022)

Chile includes the Juan Fernández Islands and Easter Island in the Pacific Ocean. It also claims Chilean Antarctic Territory.

==== Easter Island ====
Alcalde: Pedro Edmunds Paoa

==== Juan Fernández Islands ====
Alcalde: Felipe Paredes Vergara

=== Colombia ===
(Colombia)

- President: Iván Duque (2018–2022)
- Vice President: Marta Lucía Ramírez (2018–2022)

=== Ecuador ===
(Ecuador)

- President:
  - Lenin Moreno (2017–2021)
  - Guillermo Lasso (2021–2023)
- Vice President:
  - María Alejandra Muñoz (2020–2021)
  - Alfredo Borrero (2021–2023)

=== Guyana ===
(Guyana)

- President: Irfaan Ali (since 2020)
- Prime Minister: Mark Phillips (since 2020)

The Essequibo territory is administered by Guyana but claimed by Venezuela. Tigri Area is disputed with Suriname.

=== Paraguay ===
(Paraguay)

- President: Mario Abdo Benítez (2018–2023)
- Vice President: Hugo Velázquez Moreno (2018–2023)

=== Peru ===
(Peru)

- President:
  - Francisco Sagasti (2020–2021)
  - Pedro Castillo (2021–2022)
- Prime Minister:
  - Violeta Bermúdez (2020–2021)
  - Guido Bellido (2021)
  - Mirtha Vásquez (2021–2022)

=== Suriname ===
(Suriname)

- President: Chan Santokhi (2020–2025)
- Vice President: Ronnie Brunswijk (2020–2025)

Tigri Area is disputed with Guyana.

=== Uruguay ===
(Uruguay)

- President: Luis Lacalle Pou (2020–2025)
- Vice President: Beatriz Argimón (2020–2025)

=== Venezuela ===
(Venezuela)

- President: Nicolás Maduro (2013–present)
- Vice President: Delcy Rodríguez (2018–present)

Venezuela claims Guayana Esequiba as part of its territory.

=== British Overseas Territories ===
(United Kingdom)

- Monarch: Elizabeth II (since 1952)

==== Falkland Islands ====
(Falkland Islands)

- Governor: Nigel Phillips (since 2017)

The Falkland Islands are also claimed by Argentina, which calls them Islas Malvinas (Malvinas Islands).

==== South Georgia and the South Sandwich Islands ====
- Commissioner: Nigel Phillips (since 2017)

=== French Guiana ===
(France)

- President: Emmanuel Macron (since 2017)
- Prime Minister: Jean Castex (since 2020)
- Prefect: Thierry Queffelec

== Events ==
=== January and February ===
- January 8 – Twenty-three killed in La Vega massacre in Caracas, Venezuela.
- January 14 – The hospital system in Manaus, Amazonas, Brazil, is overwhelmed with 2,516 new infections and 254 hospitalisations. Hospitals report shortages of oxygen (O_{2}).
- January 17 – Antony Blinken, President-elect Joe Biden's United States Secretary of State, says that the U.S. will continue to recognize Juan Guaidó as legitimate president of Venezuela.
- January 21
  - The European Parliament calls on EU governments to recognize Juan Guaido as Venezuela's interim president.
  - Venezuela stops two Guyanese fishing boats in the disputed Essequibo territory. The crews were freed on February 3.
- January 23 – COVID-19 pandemic: Brazil begins vaccination with two million doses of Oxford–AstraZeneca COVID-19 vaccine made in India.
- January 28 – The Lowy Institute, an independent think tank in Australia, rates the adequacy of 98 countries′ COVID-19 pandemic response. Brazil, Mexico, and Colombia are the lowest rated, at numbers 98, 97, and 96, respectively.
- January 29
  - Peru sends troops to its border with Ecuador to impede immigration, principally from Venezuela.
  - It was announced that the USCGC Stone would not make its scheduled stop in Argentina after visiting Guyana, Brasil, and Uruguay. The ship is on a mission to stop illegal fishing, valued at $151 billion in 2018, and coming mostly from China, South Korea, Indonesia, and Taiwan. Montevideo is the second-most important pirate port in the world.
- February 8 – Kristalina Georgieva of the International Monetary Fund (IMF) predicts that Latin American and Caribbean economic activity will not return to pre-pandemic levels of output until 2023 and GDP per capita will catch up only in 2025.
- February 19 – The Group of Seven (G-7) promises an equitable distribution of COVID-19 vaccines, although few details have been provided.

=== March and April ===
- March 10 – Ecuador condemns Argentine President Alberto Fernández's statements about Lenín Moreno as interference in their affairs. When asked about his relationship with vice president Cristina Kirchner, Fernandez replied, "Yo no soy Lenín Moreno. Los que imaginaron eso no me conocen" ("I am not Lenín Moreno. Those who imagine otherwise do not know me").
- April 2
  - Verónika Mendoza, leftist candidate for president of Peru, calls Venezuelan President Nicolás Maduro a dictator during a press conference with the Asociación de Prensa Extranjera en el Perú (APEP).
  - Planes from Bolivarian Military Aviation (National Bolivarian Armed Forces of Venezuela) are filmed flying over Colombian territory.

== Programmed and scheduled events ==
=== Elections ===
- February 1 – 2021 President of the Federal Senate of Brazil election
- February 2 – 2021 President of the Chamber of Deputies of Brazil election
- February 7 – 2021 Ecuadorian general election
- April 4
  - 2021 Chilean municipal elections
  - 2021 Chilean constitutional convention elections
- April 11 – 2021 Peruvian general election
- November 4 – 2021 Falkland Islands general election
- November 21 – 2021 Chilean general election
- TBA
  - November
    - 2020 Paraguayan municipal elections
  - 2021 Guyanese local elections

=== Major holidays ===
==== January to April ====
- January 1 – New Year's Day
- February 15–16 — Carnival
- February 23 – Republic Day, Public holidays in Guyana.
- February 25 – Day of Liberation and Innovation, Suriname.
- March 24 – Day of Remembrance for Truth and Justice, Public holidays in Argentina.
- March 29 – Phagwah, Guyana and Suriname.
- April 19 – Landing of the 33 Patriots Day, Public holidays in Uruguay.
- April 21 – Tiradentes Day, Public holidays in Brazil.

==== May to August ====
- May 1 – Labour Day and International Workers' Day
- May 15 – Independence Day, Public holidays in Paraguay.
- May 24 – Battle of Pichincha Day, Public holidays in Ecuador.
- May 26 – Independence Day, Guyana.
- June 10 – Abolition Day, French Guiana.
- June 12 – Queen Elizabeth II's Birthday, Commonwealth of Nations.
- June 14 – Liberation Day (Falkland Islands).
- June 19 – José Gervasio Artigas Birthday, Public holidays in Uruguay.
- June 21 – Andean New Year, Public holidays in Bolivia, Chile, and Peru.
- June 24 – Battle of Carabobo Day and Feast of John the Baptist, Public holidays in Venezuela.
- June 29 – Feast of Saints Peter and Paul.
- July 1 – Ketikoti, Emancipation Day in Suriname.
- July 5 – Independence Day (Venezuela).
- July 9 – Independence Day, Argentina.
- July 14 – Fête nationale celebrated in French Guiana.
- July 20 – Colombian Declaration of Independence.
- July 24 – Simón Bolívar′s Birthday.
- July 28–29 — Fiestas Patrias (Peru).
- August 2 – Emancipation Day, Guyana.
- August 6 – Independence Day, Bolivia,
- August 7 – Battle of Boyacá Day, Public holidays in Colombia.
- August 9 – Independence Day, Ecuador.
- August 25 – Independence Day, Uruguay.
- August 30 – Feast of St. Rose of Lima, patroness of Peru.

==== September to December ====
- September 7 – Independence Day (Brazil).
- September 18–19 — Fiestas Patrias (Chile).
- September 29 – Battle of Boquerón Day, Paraguay.
- October 8 – Independence of Guayaquil, Ecuador.
- October 12 – Feast of Our Lady of Aparecida, patroness of Brazil.
- November 2 – Independence of Cuenca.Ecuador.
- November 15
  - Proclamation of the Republic (Brazil).
  - Independence of Cartagena, Colombia Day.
- November 25 – Independence Day, Suriname.
- December 25 – Christmas

== Sports ==
- January 30 – 2020 Copa Libertadores Final.
- September 11–14 — 3X3 Basketball at the 2021 Junior Pan American Games in Cali, Colombia.

== Deaths ==
=== January and February ===
- January 3 – Salvador Franco, Venezuelan Indigenous rights leader; died in prison.
- January 4 – Guillermo Rodríguez Melgarejo, 77, Argentine Bishop of Roman Catholic Diocese of San Martín in Argentina (2003–2018).
- January 8 – Cástor Oswaldo Azuaje Pérez, 69, Bishop of Roman Catholic Diocese of Trujillo, Venezuela (since 2012); COVID-19.
- January 11 – Luis Adriano Piedrahita, 74, Colombian Roman Catholic bishop and theologian; COVID-19; (b. 1946)
- January 13 – Eusébio Scheid, 88, Brazilian Roman Catholic cardinal, Archbishop of Roman Catholic Archdiocese of São Sebastião do Rio de Janeiro (2001–2009); COVID-19.
- January 24 – Brazilians who died during the 2021 Tocantinense aviation disaster:
  - Marcus Molinari, 23, footballer (Tupi, Ipatinga, Tupynambás).
  - Lucas Meira, 32, football executive, president of Palmas Futebol e Regatas.
  - Guilherme Noé, 28, footballer (Batatais, Rio Preto, Ipatinga).
  - Lucas Praxedes, 23, footballer.
  - Ranule, 27, footballer (Atlético Itapemirim, Democrata, Resende).
- January 26 – Carlos Holmes Trujillo, 69, Colombian politician, Defense Minister; COVID-19.
- February 9 – José Maranhão, 87, Brazilian politician, Deputy (1983–1994), Senator (2003–2009, since 2015) and Governor of Paraíba (1995–2002, 2009–2011); COVID-19.
- February 14 – Carlos Menem, 90, Argentine politician (Justicialist Party), national senator (2005-2021), President of Argentina (1989-1999).
- February 16 – Gustavo Noboa, 83, President of Ecuador (2000–2003) and Vice President (1998–2000), Governor of Guayas Province (1983–1984); heart attack.

=== March and April ===
- March 3 – Sérgio Eduardo Castriani, 66, Brazilian archbishop of Roman Catholic Archdiocese of Manaus (2012–2019); sepsis.

=== November ===
- November 5 – Marília Mendonça, 26, Brazilian singer and Grammy winner (2019); air crash

== See also ==
- 2020s
- 2020s in political history
- List of state leaders in South America in 2021
- Mercosur
- Organization of American States
- Organization of Ibero-American States
- Caribbean Community
- Union of South American Nations
