= Sebba (surname) =

Sebba is a surname. Notable people with this surname include:

- Abdul Hamid Sebba (1934–2021), Brazilian lawyer and politician
- Anne Sebba (born 1951), British biographer, writer, lecturer and journalist
- César Augusto Sebba, Brazilian basketball player
- Mark Sebba (1948–2018), British fashion entrepreneur, husband of Anne
