= Marcus Molinari =

Brazilian footballer (1997–2021)

Personal information
- Full name: Marcus Vinicius Molinari Reis
- Date of birth: 30 December 1997
- Date of death: 24 January 2021 (aged 23)
- Place of death: Porto Nacional, Tocantins, Brazil
- Height: 1.85 m (6 ft 1 in)
- Position: Forward

Youth career
- Atlético Mineiro
- Villa Nova-MG

Senior career*
Years	Team	Apps	(Gls)
2017	Araxá	2	(1)
2018	Santos	0	(0)
2019	Tupi	4	(2)
2020–2021	Ipatinga	5	(1)
2020	→ Tupynambás (loan)	10	(1)
2021	→ Palmas (loan)	0	(0)
Total		21	(5)
- * Club domestic league appearances and goals

Marcus Vinicius Molinari Reis (30 December 1997 – 24 January 2021) was a Brazilian footballer.

== Early life ==
Molinari was born to former footballer Marinho, who played for a number of clubs in Brazil. Marinho later confessed that he did not want his son to become a footballer, and instead wanted him to focus on his studies, but Molinari told him that it was his dream to play football.

== Club career ==
Molinari began his career playing futsal in the academy of Atlético Mineiro, one of the clubs his father played for, before joining the academy of Villa Nova-MG. Following his departure from Villa Nova, he joined Araxá, where he finished as the season's top scorer at under-20 level. These performances caught the eye of Série A side Santos, and he joined the club's under-23 side for the 2018 season.

He struggled with injury during his time at Santos, and failed to make an impact, before departing the club at the end of the season and joining Tupi. He stated that the move to Tupi was a step up to professional level, and he was adjusting to maturing off the field in terms of diet and rest. Ahead of the 2020 season, he joined Ipatinga, but after a handful of appearances in the Campeonato Mineiro Módulo II - the second division of football in the Minas Gerais state - he was loaned to Tupynambás in the Série D.

He was sent on loan again in 2021, this time to Palmas, but would not feature for the club.

== Death ==
Following his loan more to Palmas, he was set to feature in a Copa Verde away game against Vila Nova, and boarded a plane on 24 January 2021, alongside new teammates Lucas Praxedes, Guilherme Noé and Ranule, as well as team president Lucas Meira, in order to fly to the match. All four players had recently been diagnosed with COVID-19, with the isolation period ending on the day they would make the flight. However, the plane failed to take off at the end of the Tocantinense Aviation Association runway and crashed, killing all onboard.

Molinari was buried in São José da Lapa, Minas Gerais, on 27 January 2021.

== Career statistics ==
=== Club ===
Appearances and goals by club, season and competition
Club	Season	League			State League		Cup		Other		Total	
Club	Season	Division	Apps	Goals	Apps	Goals	Apps	Goals	Apps	Goals	Apps	Goals
Araxá	2017				2 (Note: Appearances in the Campeonato Mineiro Módulo II)	1	0	0	0	0	2	1
Santos	2018	Série A	0	0	0	0	0	0	0	0	0	0
Tupi	2019	Série D	0	0	4 (Note: Appearances in the Campeonato Mineiro)	2	1 (Note: Appearances in the Copa do Brasil)	0	0	0	5	2
Ipatinga	2020	–			5	1	0	0	0	0	5	1
Tupynambás (loan)	2020	Série D	10	1	0	0	0	0	0	0	10	1
Palmas (loan)	2021	Série D	0	0	0	0	0	0	0	0	0	0
Career total			10	1	11	4	1	0	0	0	22	5
