= Flordelis dos Santos de Souza =

Gospel-singing Brazilian congresswoman

Flordelis
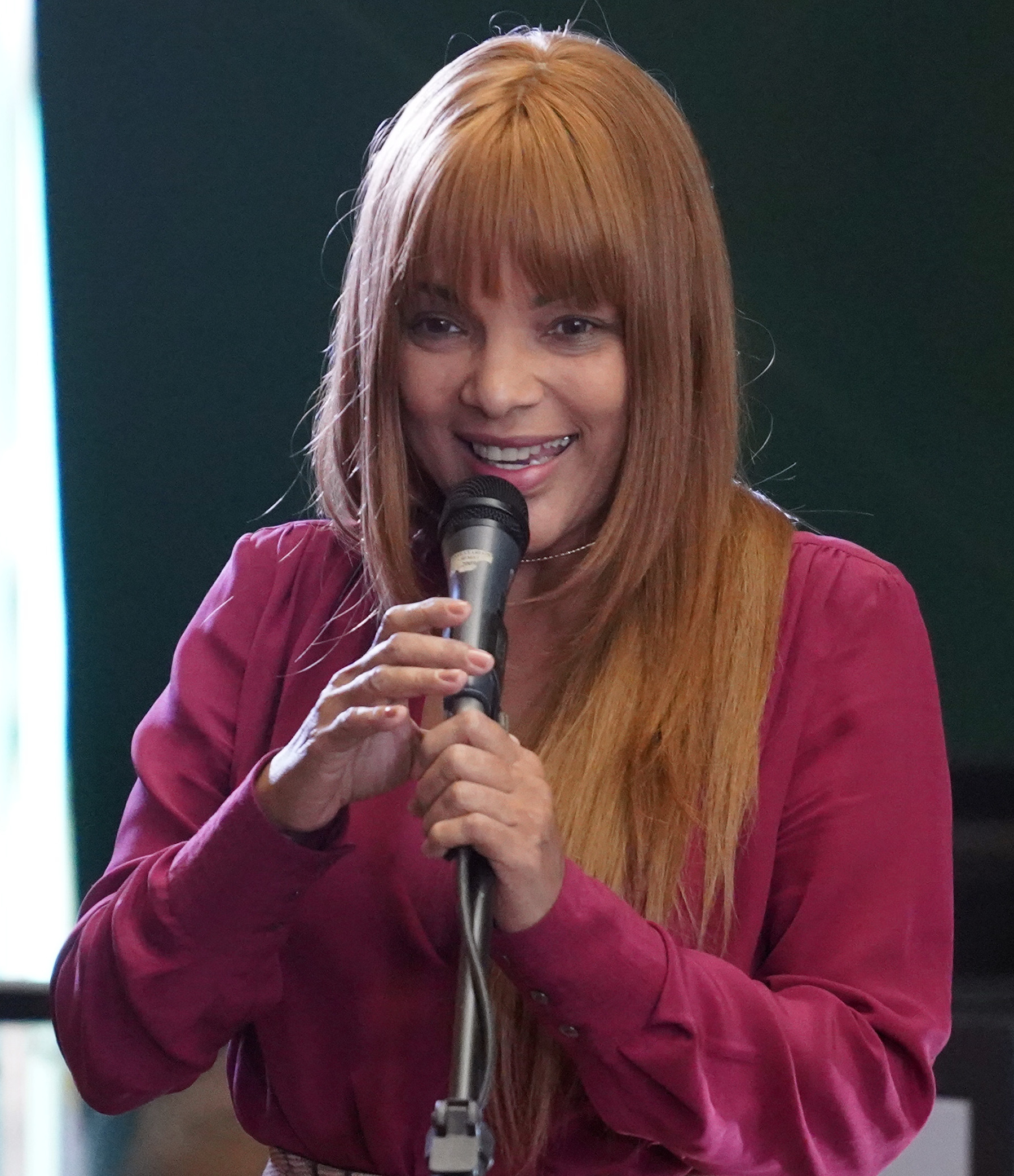
- Flordelis in 2019

Federal Deputy from Rio de Janeiro
- In office 1 February 2019 – 11 August 2021

Personal details
- Born: Flordelis dos Santos de Souza; 5 February 1961 (age 65) Rio de Janeiro, Brazil
- Party: PMDB (2003–05); PSDB (2005–07); PDT (2007–16); MDB (2016–18); PSD (2018–21)
- Spouse: Anderson do Carmo (m. 1993; died 2019)
- Children: 55 (51 adopted)
- Musical career
- Genres: Contemporary Christian; Gospel
- Years active: 1998–2021
- Labels: Apascentar Music; MK Music

Religious life
- Religion: Christian
- Denomination: Pentecostal
- Church: Ministry Flordelis Evangelic Community
- Criminal information
- Status: Incarcerated at José Frederico Marques Public Jail, Rio de Janeiro
- Convictions: First degree murder, attempted murder, forgery, armed criminal association
- Penalty: 52 years in prison

Details
- Victims: Anderson do Carmo
- Country: Brazil
- State: Rio de Janeiro
- Date apprehended: 13 August 2021

Flordelis dos Santos de Souza (born 5 February 1961), known mononymously as Flordelis, is a Brazilian singer, former Pentecostal pastor and politician, and convicted murderer.

A former member of the Chamber of Deputies (representing Rio de Janeiro), Flordelis came to wider prominence in Brazil through her music career, becoming a notable singer in the Contemporary Christian genre. She was convicted of the murder of her husband, pastor Anderson do Carmo, in November 2022. She belonged to the party Brazilian Democratic Movement (MDB) between 2004 and 2018, and was a member of Social Democratic Party (PSD) between 2018 and 2021. She has 3 biological and 51 "adopted" children, though it is unclear how many of these were legally adopted. She adopted Anderson do Carmo at the age of 14 in 1991, and married him in 1998. In 1999, they co-founded the church Comunidade Evangélica Ministério Flordelis (English: Evangelical Community Ministry of Flordelis). In November 2022, she was convicted of murder of Anderson and sentenced to 50 years in prison.

== Biography ==
Flordelis was born in Jacarezinho, Rio de Janeiro in 1961 to Francisco dos Santos and Carmozina Motta dos Santos. At the age of 14, she lost her father and brother in a car accident. She became a teacher and pastor, and in 1994, she adopted 37 children at once. Her charity work and adoptions attracted the attention of the media, and a film based on her life, Flordelis: Basta uma Palavra para Mudar, was released in 2009. After the release of the film, Flordelis approached the Rio de Janeiro label MK Music. Until then, she had released independent records and one distributed by Apascentar Music, a label of the then-band Toque no Altar. In 2010 she signed with MK Music and released her first album, Fogo e Unção.

=== Political career ===
In 2004, Flordelis ran unsuccessfully for the São Gonçalo City Council. In 2016, she ran for mayor of São Gonçalo for the MDB. From 2019 until 2021, Flordelis was a member of the Chamber of Deputies representing Rio de Janeiro after winning the 2018 elections, after having received support from Arolde de Oliveira.

=== Murder conviction ===
Early in the morning of 16 June 2019, her husband, Anderson do Carmo de Souza, was shot dead outside his home. One of the adopted children, 18-year-old Lucas dos Santos do Carmo, pleaded guilty to the murder, and also accused one of his adoptive brothers, the 38-year-old Flávio dos Santos, of complicity. In August 2020, prosecutors announced charges against Flordelis and several of her children, alleging that they had orchestrated Anderson's murder. Police could not arrest Flordelis because she held parliamentary immunity, but detectives pushed for her status as a member of Congress to be stripped.

==== Loss of mandate ====
In June 2021, the Ethics Council of Brazil approved the loss of the mandate of Representative Flordelis, by 16 votes to 1. The Chamber floor approved the resolution with 437 votes for the removal, 7 against and 12 abstentions. On August 11, 2021, Flordelis had her mandate as a congresswoman revoked by the Chamber, in a lawsuit filed by Representative Alexandre Leite. She lost her term of office for breach of parliamentary decorum and, as a result, could be tried and imprisoned for her husband's death. In addition to losing office, a Representative will be ineligible as determined by the Law of Ficha Limpa.

==== Conviction and prison ====
Flordelis had her preventive detention decreed by the 3rd Criminal Court of Niterói after being arrested on August 13, 2021, by Rio de Janeiro Civil Police. She lost the parliamentary immunity she enjoyed when her term was revoked, and is thus subject to the same treatment as an ordinary citizen. In November 2022, she was convicted of murder and sentenced to 50 years in prison.

== Discography ==
Studio albums

- Multidão (1998)
- Só o Amor (2002)
- A Voz do Silêncio (2005)
- Não se Entregue (2008)
- Fogo e Unção (2010)
- Questiona ou Adora (2012)
- A Volta por Cima (2014)
- Realize (2017)
- O Sonho Não Morreu (2018)

Live albums

- Ao Vivo (2016)

Video albums

- Ao Vivo (2016)

== See also ==
- List of scandals in Brazil
