= Robert de Almendra Freitas =

Brazilian politician (1947–2021)

Member of the Legislative Assembly of Piauí
- In office 1987–2003

Mayor of José de Freitas
- In office 2005–2010
- Preceded by: Pedro Paulo Macedo da Rocha
- Succeeded by: Ricardo Silva Camarço

Personal details
- Born: 16 November 1947 José de Freitas, Piauí, Brazil
- Died: 5 April 2021 (aged 73) Teresina, Piauí, Brazil
- Party: DEM; PSDB

Robert de Almendra Freitas 16 November 1947 – 5 April 2021) was a Brazilian doctor and politician.

== Biography ==
The son of Ferdinand Carvalho de Almendra Freitas and Maria de Jesus Carvalho de Almendra Freitas, Robert worked as an orthopedist at the Hospital Getúlio Vargas in Teresina and was Piauí's Regional Secretary of Social Medicine for the Sistema Único de Saúde. He served in the Legislative Assembly of Piauí for the Democrats from 1987 to 2003, being re-elected in 1990, 1994, and 1998. He was elected Mayor of José de Freitas in 2004 and re-elected in 2008. However, he was impeached and forced to leave office in 2010.

Robert de Almendra Freitas died of COVID-19 in Teresina on 5 April 2021, at the age of 73.
