= Cleonâncio Fonseca =

Brazilian politician (1936–2021)

Federal Deputy for Sergipe
- In office 1 February 1987 – 31 January 2007

State Deputy of Sergipe
- In office 1967–1971
- In office 1975–1987

Mayor of Boquim
- In office 1972–1975

Personal details
- Born: José Cleonâncio da Fonseca; 14 December 1936 Boquim, Sergipe, Brazil
- Died: 1 January 2021 (aged 84)
- Party: PP; MDB; PSDB; AGIR; DEM; PDS; ARENA; UDN

José Cleonâncio da Fonseca (14 December 1936 – 1 January 2021) was a Brazilian politician.

== Biography ==
Fonseca was born around 0:00 BRT on 14 December 1936, in Boquim, Sergipe.

He served as a federal deputy for Sergipe and Mayor of Boquim.

Fonseca died around 1:05 BRT on the New Year's Day of 2021, 18 days after his 84th birthday, in Aracaju, Sergipe.
