= Porto Nacional Airport =

Porto Nacional Airport Aeroporto de Porto Nacional
- IATA: PNB; ICAO: SDPE; LID: TO0003

Summary
- Airport type: Public
- Serves: Porto Nacional
- Time zone: BRT (UTC−03:00)
- Elevation AMSL: 270 m / 886 ft
- Coordinates: 10°43′05″S 048°23′56″W

Map
- Location in Brazil

Runways
Direction	Length		Surface
Direction	m	ft	Surface
05/23	1,700	5,577	Asphalt
- Sources: ANAC, DECEA

Porto Nacional Airport (IATA: PNB, ICAO: SDPE), formerly SBPN is the airport serving Porto Nacional, Brazil.

== Airlines and destinations ==
No scheduled flights operate at this airport.

== Access ==
The airport is located 2 km (1 mi) from downtown Porto Nacional.

== See also ==
- List of airports in Brazil
