= Irmão Lázaro =

Brazilian singer and politician (1966–2021)

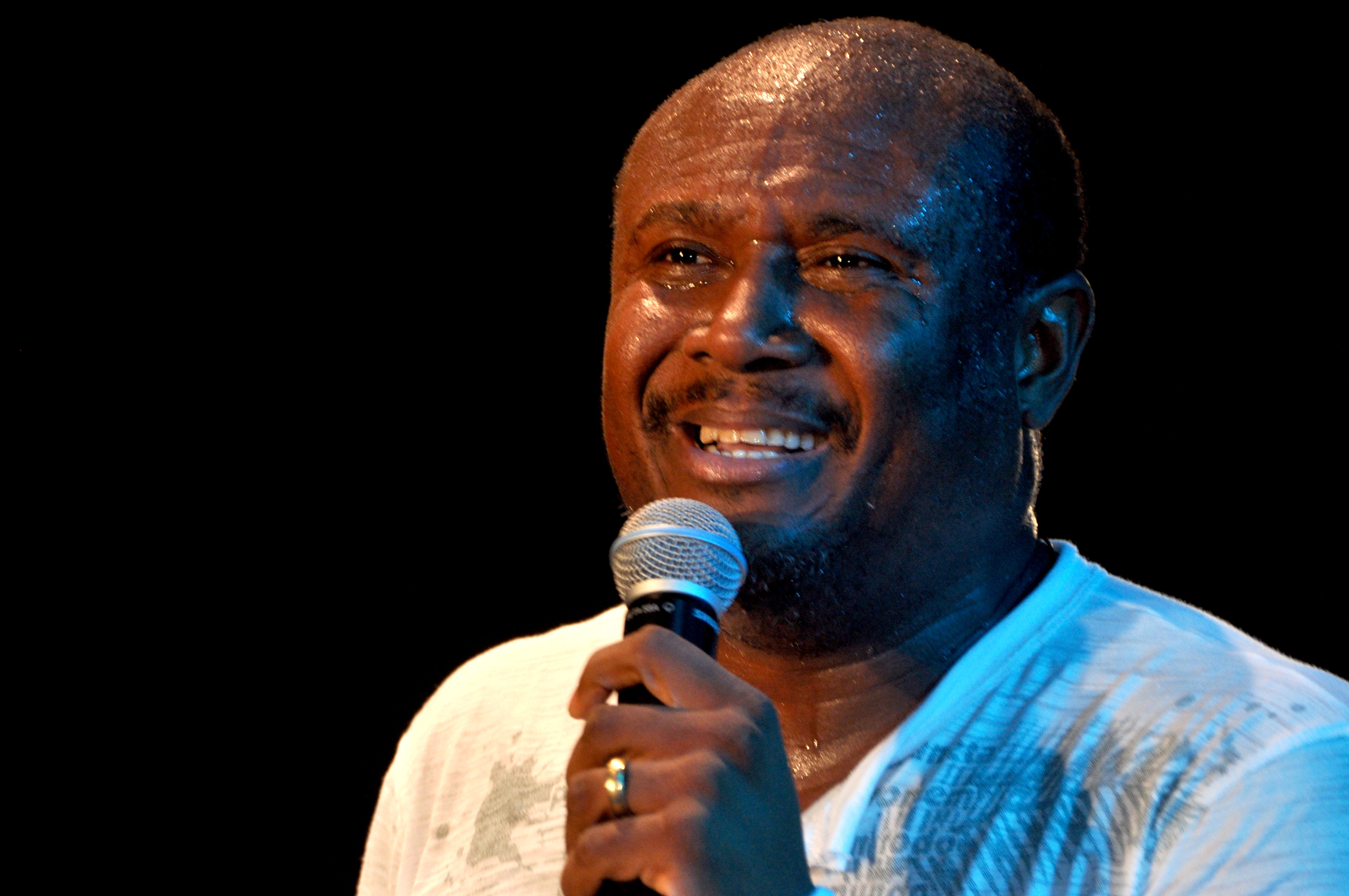
- Born: 9 November 1966; Salvador, Bahia
- Died: 19 March 2021 (aged 54); Feira de Santana

Antonio Lázaro da Silva, better known as Irmão Lázaro (9 November 1966 – 19 March 2021), was a Brazilian gospel singer and politician who served as a Deputy from 2015 to 2019.
