= Icapuí =

Municipality in Ceará, Brazil

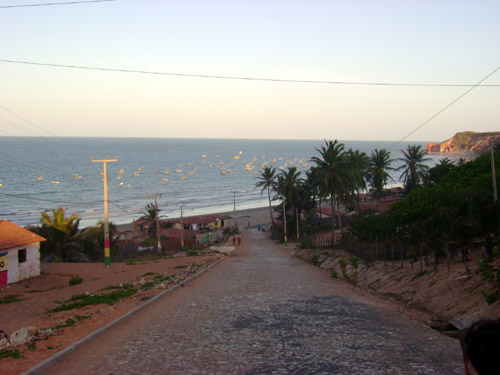
- A beach in Icapuí.

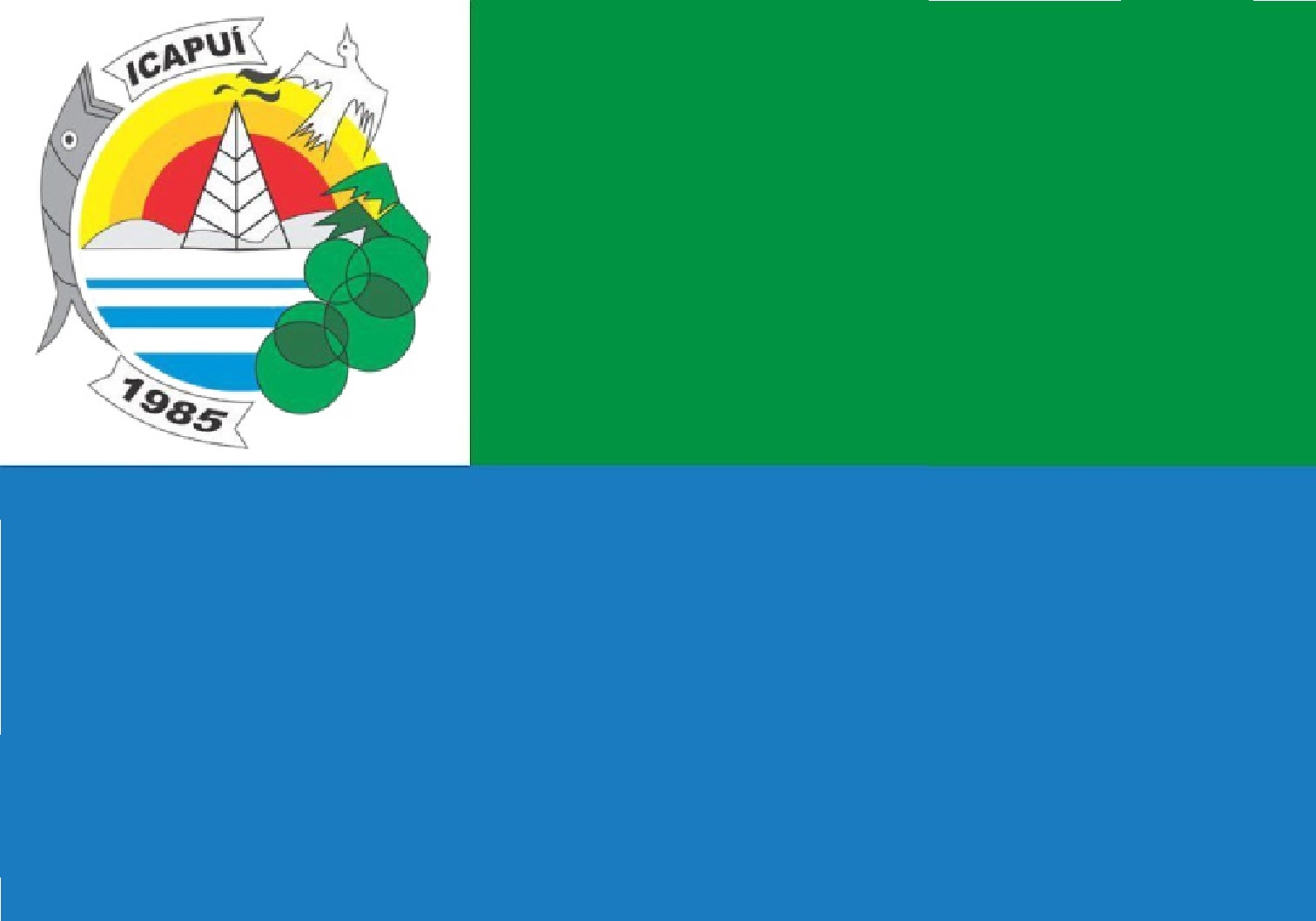
- Flag

- Location of Icapuí in Ceará
- Coordinates: 04°42′46″S 37°21′18″W
- Country: Brazil
- Region: Northeast
- State: Ceará
- Founded: January 22, 1984

Government
  - Mayor: Raimundo Lacerda Filho (PSD)

Area
  - Total: 428.688 km^{2} (165.517 sq mi)

Population (2020)
  - Total: 20,060
  - Density: 43.4/km^{2} (112/sq mi)
- Time zone: UTC−3 (BRT)
- HDI (2000): 0.631 – medium

Icapuí is the easternmost municipality in the Brazilian state of Ceará, located in the northeast coast of the state. Known for being the first city in Brazil to perform the eradication of illiteracy.
