= Herzem Gusmão Pereira =

Brazilian politician (1948–2021)

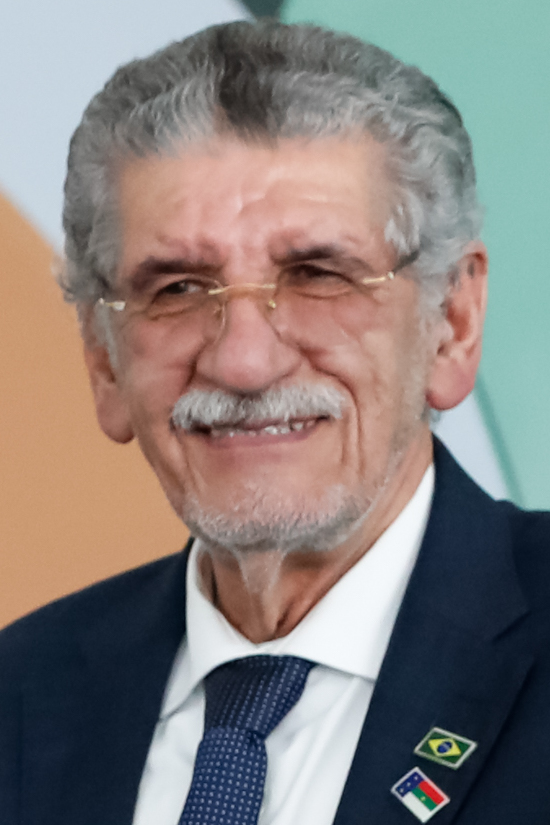
- Gusmão in July 2019

Member of the Legislative Assembly of Bahia
- In office 2015–2016

Mayor of Vitória da Conquista
- In office 1 January 2017 – 18 March 2021
- Preceded by: Guilherme Menezes
- Succeeded by: Sheila Lemos

Personal details
- Born: 2 June 1948; Vitória da Conquista, Bahia, Brazil
- Died: 18 March 2021 (aged 72); São Paulo, Brazil
- Political party: MDB

Herzem Gusmão Pereira (2 June 1948 – 18 March 2021) was a Brazilian politician and journalist.

== Biography ==
He served as Mayor of Vitória da Conquista and was a member of the Legislative Assembly of Bahia.

He worked for Rádio Clube de Conquista and Rádio Brasil FM prior to his political career.

Pereira was diagnosed with COVID-19 7 December 2020 shortly after being re-elected as Mayor of Vitória da Conquista. He was then hospitalized and transferred to São Paulo, where he died on 18 March 2021 at the age of 72.
