= Contardo Calligaris =

Italian-Brazilian psychoanalyst and writer (1948–2021)

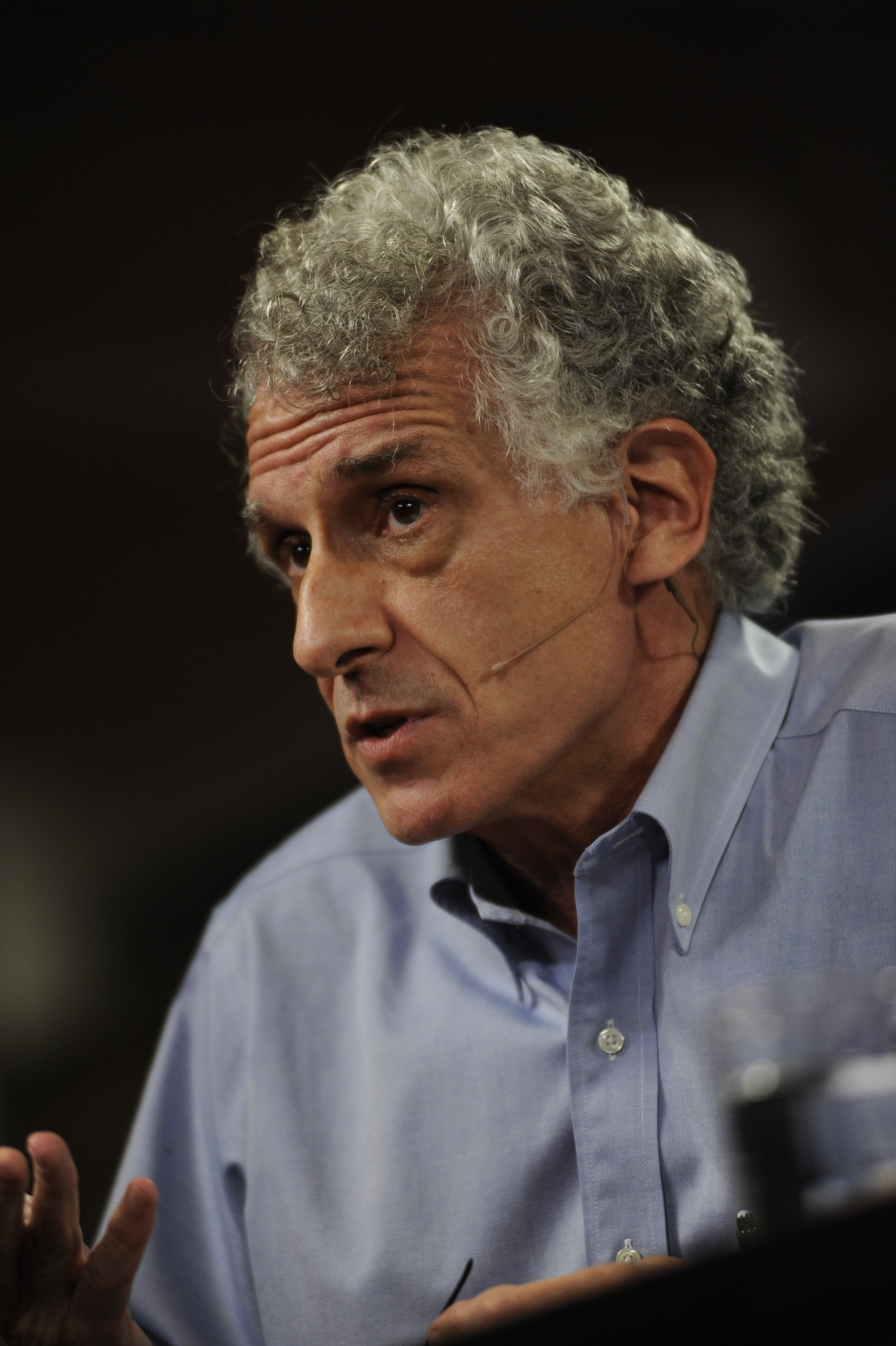
- Calligaris in August 2009
- Born: 2 June 1948; Milan, Lombardy, Italy
- Died: 30 March 2021 (aged 72); São Paulo, Brazil

Education
- Education: University of Provence

Philosophical work
- School: Psychoanalysis
- Institutions: University of California, Berkeley
- Main interests: Psychoanalysis
- Notable ideas: The passion to become a tool

Contardo Luigi Calligaris (2 June 1948 – 30 March 2021) was an Italian-Brazilian writer, psychoanalyst and dramaturg. He was a weekly columnist at Folha de S. Paulo, a daily publication regarded as a newspaper of record in Brazil.

== Biography ==
Calligaris originally studied genetic epistemology in Switzerland under Jean Piaget. He was focused on social sciences but at the same time he completed lectures that allowed him to pursue studies in theory of literature.

He continued his literary studies in Paris with Roland Barthes, earning doctorate in linguistic semiology. During his time in Paris he became interested in psychoanalysis and also went through psychoanalysis himself, as a patient.

Still in Paris, in 1975 Calligaris became involved with the Freudian school of psychoanalysis and frequented case presentations led by Jacques Lacan.

Following his interest in psychoanalysis and related studies, Calligaris became doctor of clinical psychology at the University of Provence in France. His doctoral thesis, named "The passion to become a tool", was a study into bureaucratic personality, interpreting it as an attempt of an individual to handle their neurosis.

In the 1980s, Calligaris moved to the United States where he became professor of anthropology at the University of California, Berkeley and professor of cultural studies at The New School in New York.

Calligaris' first connection with Brazil happened in 1986 after his first psychoanalytic publication was released there.

As the author, Calligaris traveled to Brazil several times following the book release. On one of these occasions a group of psychoanalysts from São Paulo approached him and proposed he come back for fifteen days once every two months so that they can run psychoanalytic sessions together. Calligaris liked the idea and accepted.

Eventually he ended up living in Brazil permanently, continuing his academic career there. Other than that, he had been contributing weekly columns to Folha de S. Paulo since 1999 and has published several books.

He died of cancer on 30 March 2021.

== Publications ==
Calligaris wrote a weekly column for Folha de S. Paulo focusing on cultural, historical and social commentary.

Among the non-academic books he wrote, Conto do Amor (Companhia das Letras, 2008), or "The Tale of Love" in English, is considered to be his principal work. The book is semi-autobiographical:

Like the author, the protagonist of The Tale of Love is a psychoanalyst, sees patients in New York and had a father engaged in the Italian anti-fascist resistance. "The first chapter, in its details, is completely and accurately autobiographical," Calligaris says. "I never knew what to do with that strange 'confidentiality' of my father at the time of his death. Of course, I went to Monte Oliveto and all, but found nothing. Nothing, not a fiction. But maybe all that fiction is, is really just this: a way to continue a dialogue that was truncated in reality."
