= Late December 2021 Bahia floods =

Natural disaster in Bahia, Brazil

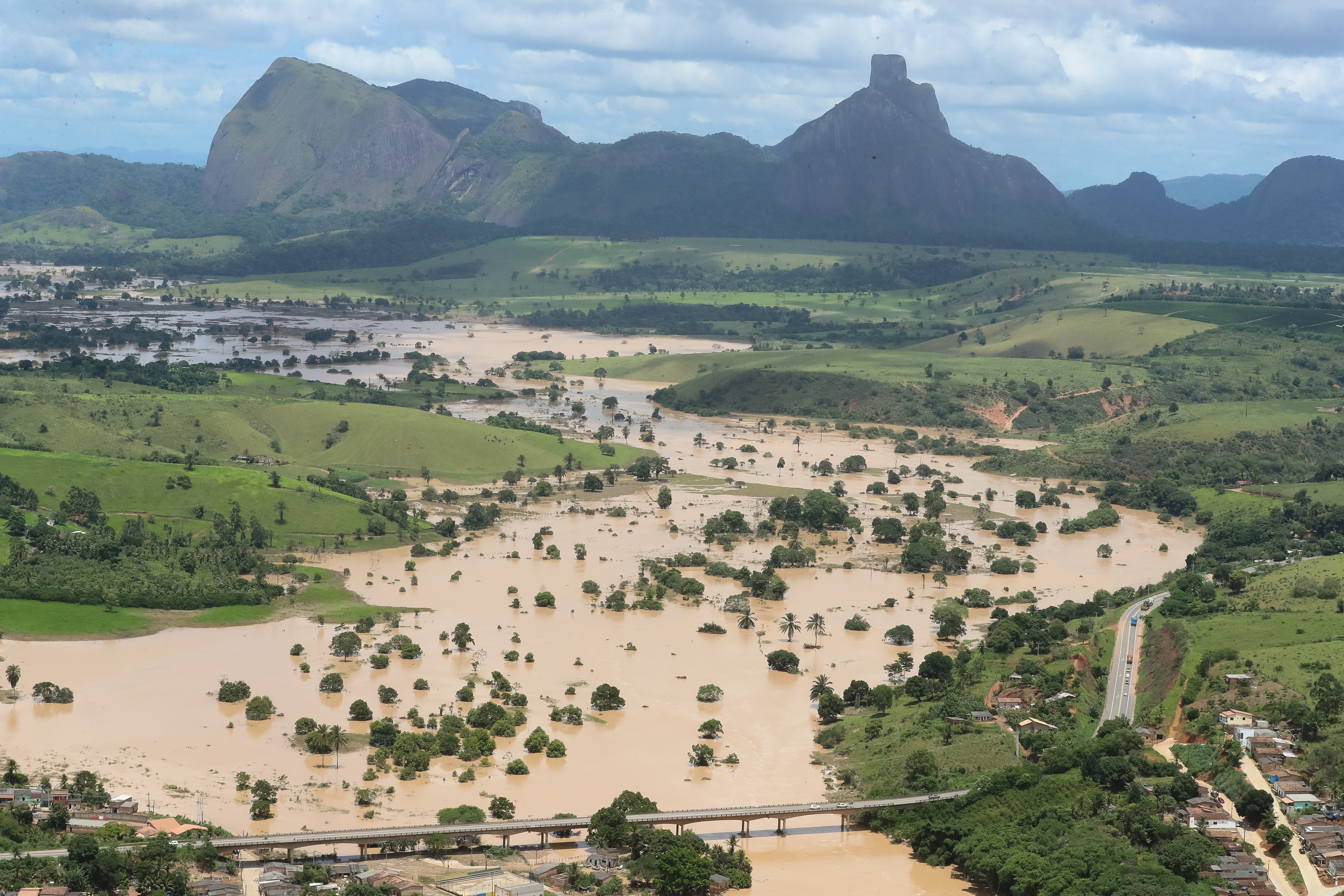
- Date: 24 December 2021 – early 2022
- Location: Bahia, Brazil
- Type: Flood
- Outcome: State of emergency declared in 72 municipalities at Bahia
- Deaths: 21
- Injuries: 280+
- Displaced: over 35,000

Beginning on 24 December 2021, record rainfall across the northeastern Brazilian state Bahia resulted in severe floods, which caused the death of 21 people, injured another 358 and displaced 62,800. In a tweet, Rui Costa, the Governor of Bahia, declared the floods to be "the worst disaster that has ever occurred in the history of Bahia". 72 municipalities of Bahia declared a state of emergency.

Total rainfall in the state capital Salvador during December exceeded 250 millimetres (9.8 inches) on 24 December, five times the historic average. On 26 December, the Bahia state government and Brazilian federal government, along with cooperation from other state governments, mounted a joint rescue operation for victims in the affected areas. Two dams collapsed between 25 and 26 December, at Jussiape and Itambé, Bahia respectively. The town of Vitória da Conquista was heavily affected and the Catolé river in Itapetinga reached a height compared to its massive flood from 1989, leaving part of the city without energy and interrupting the potable water supply.

Southern Bahia had been badly flooded earlier the same month by Subtropical Storm Ubá.

COVID-19 medicines and vaccines were destroyed by the flooding.

== See also ==
- Weather of 2021
- List of deadliest floods
- 2020 Brazilian floods and mudslides
