= Nilson Borges =

Brazilian footballer (1941–2021)

Personal information
- Date of birth: 16 December 1941
- Place of birth: São Paulo, Brazil
- Date of death: 3 February 2021 (aged 79)
- Place of death: Curitiba, Paraná, Brazil
- Position: Winger

Youth career
- 1958–1960: Portuguesa-SP

Senior career*
Years	Team	Apps	(Gls)
1960–1965	Portuguesa-SP		
1965	América-SP		
1965	Portuguesa-SP		
1966	Corinthians		
1967	Juventus-SP		
1968	Athletico Paranaense		
1969	Coritiba		
1969–1971	Athletico Paranaense		
1972	Bahia		
1973–1974	Athletico Paranaense		
- * Club domestic league appearances and goals

Nilson Borges (16 December 1941 – 3 February 2021) was a Brazilian footballer who played as a winger.

== Biography ==
Borges began his career playing for Associação Portuguesa de Desportos and starting his professional career there in 1960. In 1965, he went to Europe and trained with Standard Liège and Sporting CP. However, he only played in friendly matches and was supported by a Portuguese businessman who would ask for above-market values for Borges to play.

Borges returned to Brazil later in 1965 and began playing with América-SP and later would return to Portuguesa. In 1966, he went to Corinthians, where he played as a reserve, a position he hotly contested. After playing only six games for Corinthians, he was transferred to Clube Atlético Juventus and later Club Athletico Paranaense. With Paranaense, he participated in the Campeonato Paranaense in 1970, which his team won for the first time in 12 years. He also played for Coritiba and Bahia before returning to Paranaense and retiring. After his retirement from playing, he worked for many different football clubs as a trainer and coach.

In 2020, Borges ended his football activities due to COVID-19 during the COVID-19 pandemic in Brazil and was paralyzed in his legs by an unknown condition. He died in Curitiba on 3 February 2021, at the age of 79.
