= Aécio de Borba =

Brazilian politician (1931–2021)

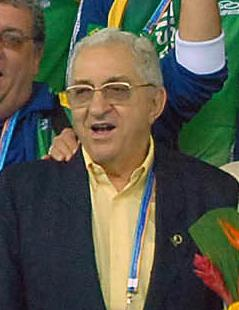
Aécio de Borba

Aécio de Borba Vasconcelos (6 April 1931 – 24 March 2021) was a Brazilian politician who served as a Deputy from 1983 to 1995 and 1997–1998.
