= Triagem =

Unofficial region of Rio de Janeiro

Coordinates: 22°53′49″S 43°14′41″W

Triagem is a region of Rio de Janeiro, but not officially recognized as a neighborhood.
