= Anne Sebba =

British writer (born 1951)

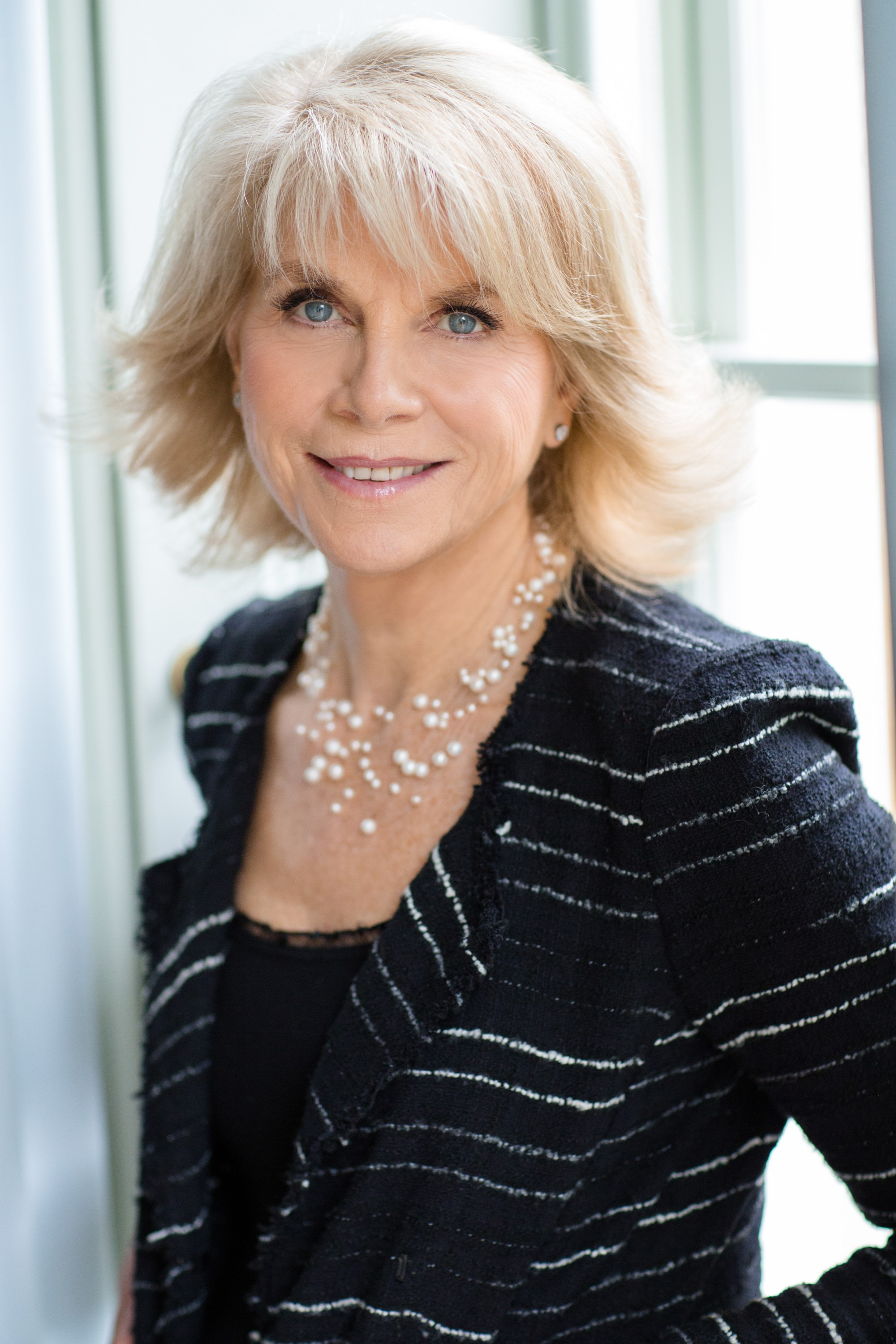
- Born: Anne Rubinstein; 31 December 1951 (age 74); London, England
- Education: King's College London
- Occupations: Author and lecturer
- Spouse: Mark Sebba (died 2018)
- Children: 3
- Writing career
- Period: 1980–
- Genres: Biography, non-fiction
- Subject: Historical women
- Website: annesebba.com

Anne Sebba (née Rubinstein; born 31 December 1951) is a British biographer, lecturer and journalist. She is the author of eleven non-fiction books for adults, two biographies for children, and several introductions to reprinted classics.

== Life ==
Anne Sebba (née Rubinstein) was born in London on 31 December 1951. She read history at King's College London (1969–72) and, after a brief spell at the BBC World Service in Bush House, joined Reuters as a graduate trainee, working in London and Rome, from 1972 to 1978. She wrote her first book while living in New York City and now lives in London.

Her discovery of an unpublished series of letters from Wallis Simpson to her second husband Ernest Simpson, shortly before her eventual marriage to the former King, Edward VIII, later the Duke of Windsor, formed the basis of a Channel 4 documentary, The Secret Letters, first shown on UK television in August 2011, and also a biography of Simpson, That Woman: The Life of Wallis Simpson Duchess of Windsor.

Sebba's books have been translated into several languages including French, Spanish, Portuguese, Japanese, Russian, Polish, Czech, Chinese, Italian and Dutch.

Since working as a correspondent for Reuters, Sebba has written for The Times, The Guardian, The Daily Telegraph, The Spectator, Times Higher Education Supplement and The Independent. She has been cited as an authority on biography.

In 2009, Sebba wrote and presented The Daffodil Maiden on BBC Radio 3. It was an account of the pianist Harriet Cohen, who inspired the composer Arnold Bax when she wore a dress adorned with a single daffodil and became his mistress for the next 40 years. In 2010, she wrote and presented the documentary Who was Joyce Hatto? for BBC Radio 4.

In September 2009, Sebba joined the management committee of the Society of Authors. She was chair of the committee between 2012 and 2014 and is now a member of the Council of the Society of Authors. She is a longstanding member of English PEN and after several years on the Writers in Prison Committee served twice on the PEN management committee. She visited Turkey twice as an official observer for PEN for the trial of journalist Asiye Guzel Zeybeck. She has served on the judging panel of the Jewish Quarterly-Wingate Literary Prize. and has twice been a judge for the Biographers' Club awards. In 2012, Sebba spoke at the Beijing and Shanghai Literary Festivals and the Sydney Writers' Festival.

Sebba is a Patron of the Museum of Richmond (MOR), Trustee of the National Archives Trust (NAT), a senior research fellow of the Institute of Historical Research (IHR), and a fellow of the Royal Society of Literature.

In 2023–2024, Sebba was appointed a judge for the Inaugural Women's Prize for Non- Fiction.

== Critical reception ==
Jennie Churchill: Winston's American Mother was reviewed, inter alia, in The Independent, The Daily Telegraph, and The Scotsman,

According to The Daily Telegraph, Sebba's book retrieved 'Jennie Churchill in sparkling three dimensions [and] does much to put flesh on the bones of a subject who has been reduced to a cipher for American Brashness.'

The Literary Review said the book was 'sharp and intelligent... immensely enjoyable. [Sebba's prose] is as smooth and elegant as expensive cashmere; it reads like a novel.'

That Woman was described in The New York Times Sunday Book Review as a "devourable feast of highly spiced history…which acquires the propulsive energy of a thriller as it advances through Wallis's life". and in The Washington Times as "a delicious new biography… meticulously researched".

In 2016, Sebba published Les Parisiennes: How the Women of Paris Lived, Loved and Died in the 1940s (Weidenfeld & Nicolson UK), published in the United States as Les Parisiennes: How the Women of Paris Lived, Loved and Died under the Nazi Occupation (St Martin's Press). This was described as "fascinating and beautifully written" by The Spectator and was the joint winner of the Franco-British society's book prize for 2016.

Les Parisiennes has been translated into Chinese, (SDX) Czech (Bourdon) and French (La Librarie Vuibert). In 2018, a reviewer in Le Figaro Magazine coined the phrase "La Méthode Sebba" to describe the author's method of linking interviews with living people and archive material to create a tableau of women during the dark years.

Ethel Rosenberg: A Cold War Tragedy, published by Weidenfeld & Nicolson (UK) in 2021, concerns the Rosenberg espionage case. Sebba's book received wide-ranging positive reviews and was shortlisted for the Wingate Award of 2022. Adam Sisman of the Literary Review said "In Anne Sebba, Ethel Rosenberg has found the ideal biographer, sympathetic without being blind to her faults and with a sure understanding of the period … Her portrayal is compelling". In the San Francisco Chronicle Carl Rollyson described the book as a "compassionate account of Ethel's character as a wife and mother" and an "engrossing narrative". In The Critic Gerald Jacobs described Sebba's reconstruction of the trial as "gripping" and went on to say "Anne Sebba has given Ethel Rosenberg a towering memorial". In The Telegraph Jake Kerridge said "Sebba gets her readers under the skin of both Ethel and her era so effectively that this shameful saga had me alternately close to tears and boiling with rage. She is right to identify this as a uniquely despicable episode in US history." Rachel Cooke in the Observer called Ethel Rosenberg as "a powerful biography" and "gripping". In The Guardian Melissa Benn said "Sebba has dug deep beneath this famous and archetypically male story of spying, weapons and international tensions to give us an intelligent, sensitive and absorbing account of the short, tragic life of a woman made remarkable by circumstance".

In 2025, to mark the 80th anniversary of the liberation of the camps, Sebba published The Women's Orchestra of Auschwitz A story of Survival in the UK and US.

Simon Heffer in The Telegraph wrote : Sebba's command of detail is superb. She quite rightly outlines the atrocities of the sadists, psychopaths and savages whom Auschwitz seemed to attract like a magnet; but also the resilience and courage of a group of women who refused to be beaten by evil, and used music to save their lives.

In the Spectator Clare Mulley described the book as "Deeply moving . . . This complex story pays fine tribute not only to the women's orchestra but also to their captive audiences, who remained as affected by the music as by the inhumanity that surrounded them'"

In The Guardian, Kathryn Hughes reviewed the book, which tells the story of approximately 40 women who formed a musical group. The author, Anne Sebba, examines the hard moral decisions these women faced and describes how playing music impacted their daily lives.

Caroline Moorehead wrote in the Times Literary Supplement "Meticulous research . . . a detailed picture of the orchestra's players. [A] remarkable story . . . The author has done these women proud."

== Bibliography ==
- Samplers: Five Centuries of a Gentle Craft (1979)
- Mother Teresa (1982) (Blackbird Books series)
- Margot Fonteyn (1983) (Blackbird Books series)
- Enid Bagnold: A Life (1986)
- Laura Ashley: A Life By Design (1990)
- Battling For News: The Rise of the Woman Reporter (1994)
- Mother Teresa: Beyond the Image (1997)
- The Exiled Collector: William Bankes and the Making of an English Country House (2005)
- Jennie Churchill: Winston's American Mother (2007)
- That Woman: The Life of Wallis Simpson, Duchess of Windsor (2011)
- Les Parisiennes: How the Women of Paris Lived, Loved and Died in the 1940s (2016)
- "A Room of One's Own... or Not?" in The Women Writers Handbook (2020)
- Ethel Rosenberg: A Cold War Tragedy (2021)
- The Women's Orchestra of Auschwitz: A Story of Survival (2025)
