= Ademar Frederico Duwe =

Brazilian politician (1938–2021)

Member of the Legislative Assembly of Santa Catarina
- In office 1987–1991

Personal details
- Born: 11 June 1938; Jaraguá do Sul, Santa Catarina, Brazil
- Died: 12 March 2021 (aged 82)
- Political party: PMDB

Ademar Frederico Duwe (11 June 1938 – 12 March 2021) was a Brazilian politician and businessman. He was a member of the Legislative Assembly of Santa Catarina during the 11th legislature from 1987 to 1991.
