= Rubens Recalcatti =

Brazilian politician (1948–2021)

Member of the Legislative Assembly of Paraná
- In office 2 May 2017 – 9 April 2021

Personal details
- Born: 23 October 1948 Videira, Santa Catarina, Brazil
- Died: 9 April 2021 (aged 72) Curitiba, Paraná, Brazil
- Party: PSD

Rubens Recalcatti (23 October 1948 – 9 April 2021) was a Brazilian politician, lawyer, and policeman. A member of the Social Democratic Party, he served on the Legislative Assembly of Paraná from 2017 until his death in 2021.

== Biography ==
The son of Jacob Recalcatti, Rubens was born in Videira and moved to Francisco Beltrão in his childhood. He moved to Curitiba in the 1970s and graduated from the Pontifical Catholic University of Paraná with a degree in social studies. In 1979, he became an investigative agent for the Civil Police of the State of Paraná. After earning a law degree from the Centro Universitário Curitiba, he was promoted to homicide detective.

In 2015, Recalcatti was detained by the Rio Branco do Sul prosecutor's office following the death of Ricardo Geffer, the primary suspect in the murder of former mayor João Dirceu Nazzari, who was Recalcatti's cousin. However, because the suspect's death occurred outside of the Rio Branco do Sul jurisdiction, there was no ongoing investigation into the case. In 2016, he was denounced by the Ministério Público do Paraná for abuse of authority and procedural fraud. In 2017, the case was sent to the Tribunal de Justiça do Paraná, although he was on the Legislative Assembly of Paraná at that point, giving him a position of privilege.

Originally a member of the Green Party, Recalcatti ran for the Legislative Assembly of Paraná in 2010, without success. In the 2014 elections, he was the first alternate for the Social Democratic Party, amassing 40,358 votes. He gained a seat in 2017 with the resignation of Chico Brasileiro, who was elected Mayor of Foz do Iguaçu. He was re-elected in 2018 with 35,248 votes.

Aside from his political or policing career, he co-wrote the book Sequestro – Modus Operandi e Estudos de Casos with Noely Manfredini, which was published in 2008.

Rubens Recalcatti died of a heart attack in Curitiba on 9 April 2021, at the age of 72.
