= Fabio Brunelli =

Brazilian news anchor and writer (1969–2021)

- Born: 11 May 1969; São Paulo, Brazil
- Died: 7 March 2021 (aged 51); Resende, Rio de Janeiro, Brazil
- Occupation(s): News anchor, writer

Fabio Brunelli (11 May 1969 – 7 March 2021) was a Brazilian news anchor, journalist, and writer.

== Biography ==
Brunelli first appeared on national television at the age of 20, the youngest Brazilian anchorman to do so. He debuted on Rede Manchete on 9 November 1989 to cover the Fall of the Berlin Wall. He stayed with Rede Manchete in the early 1990s, although he then became editor-in-chief of the RJTV newscast, produced by TV Rio Sul, an affiliate of Rede Globo.

In September 2009, Brunelli released his first novel, titled Elas por Ele. Fabio Brunelli died of cancer in Resende on 7 March 2021 at the age of 51.
