= 2021 Palmas FR plane crash =

Aviation accident in Tocantins

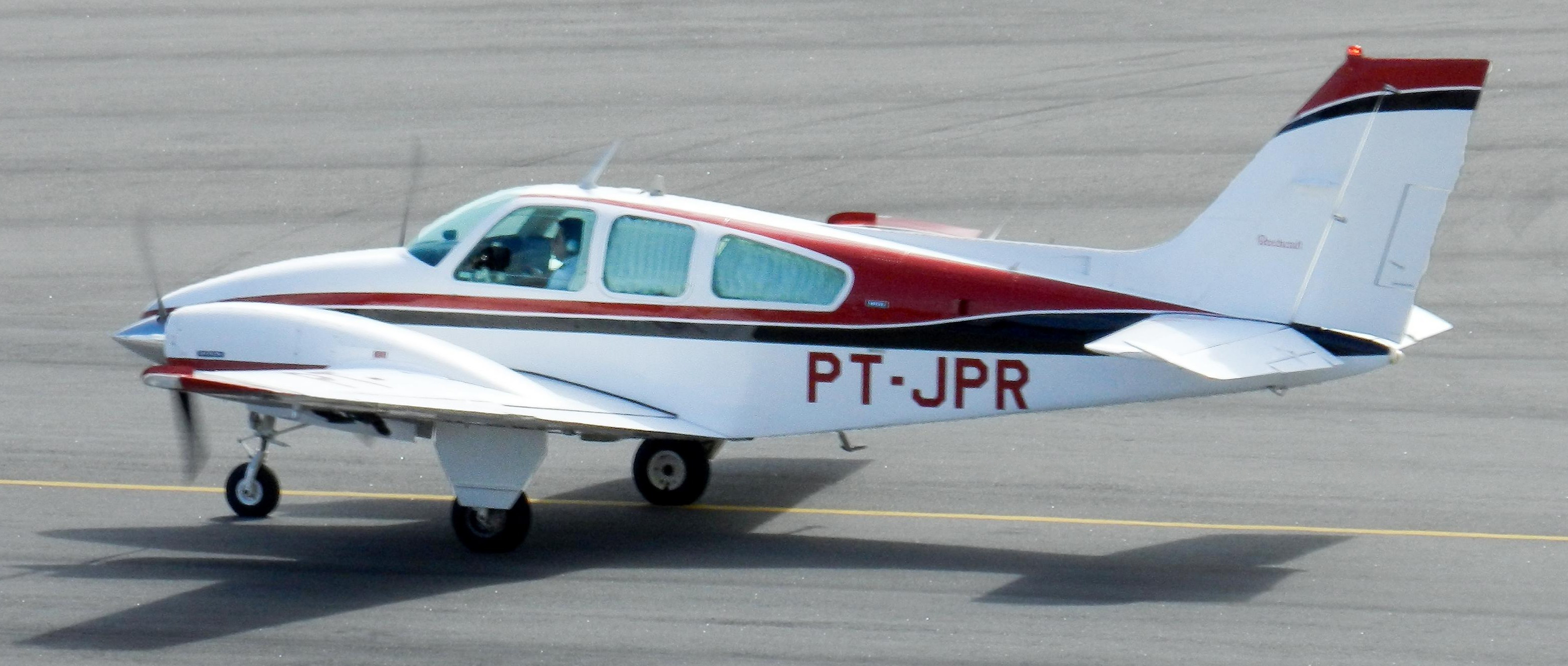
- A Beechcraft Baron similar to the incident aircraft.

Accident
- Date: 24 January 2021
- Summary: Crashed shortly after takeoff due to overloading
- Site: Porto Nacional, Tocantins

Aircraft
- Aircraft type: Beechcraft Baron 95-B55
- Operator: Construtora Meirelles Mascarenhas Ltda
- Registration: PT-LYG
- Flight origin: Associação Tocantinense de Aviação Aerodrome, Tocantins
- Destination: Santa Genoveva Aerodrome, Goiás
- Passengers: 5
- Crew: 1
- Fatalities: 6
- Survivors: 0

The 2021 Palmas FR plane crash took place on 24 January 2021, when a private Beechcraft Baron belonging to the Palmas Futebol e Regatas, a Brazilian association football team, crashed on takeoff from Associação Tocantinense de Aviação Aerodrome, a private airfield near Porto Nacional, Tocantins, Brazil. All six people on board were killed: four footballers, the team's owner, and the pilot. The team was en route to Goiânia for a regional cup football game between Palmas and Vila Nova, for the Brazilian Copa Verde championship.

== Victims ==
In a statement released to various media outlets such as CNN Brazil, it was announced that six deaths had occurred. Among the victims of the crash were identified as football players Marcus Molinari, Lucas Praxedes, Guilherme Noé, and Ranule, team president Lucas Meira plus the pilot Wagner Machado. The four footballers who died had been travelling separately from the rest of their team because they had tested positive for COVID-19.

== Investigation ==
The Aeronautical Accidents Investigation and Prevention Center (CENIPA) (Note: Portuguese: Centro de Investigação e Prevenção de Acidentes Aeronáuticos) performed a post-crash accident investigation and issued a final report dated 30 March 2023.

Ground witnesses told CENIPA that the aircraft lifted off the runway and pitched up but did not climb; it then touched down briefly while still over the runway, lifted off a second time, and the landing gear retracted. The aircraft then settled in a wings-level attitude and crashed 150 metres (490 ft) past the end of the runway, slightly to the left of the extended runway centerline. An intense post-crash fire consumed the bodies of the aircraft occupants and all baggage and paperwork in the fuselage.

CENIPA found that the occupants and baggage were not weighed before the flight, and was unable to verify precise aircraft weight and loading due to the fire damage, which CENIPA said presumably obliterated any weight-and-balance paperwork that the pilot may have completed. However, based on information gathered from the football team and the owner and players' relatives and friends, CENIPA calculated that the aircraft was loaded far in excess of its permissible gross weight, possibly by about 300 kilograms (660 lb), and it was loaded about 2 inches (51 mm) beyond its aft center of gravity (CG) limit; furthermore, the retraction of the landing gear would have caused the CG to shift even further aft. (Note: CENIPA does not elaborate, but this presumably occurred because the nosegear of the Baron retracts aft.) CENIPA stated that the probable cause of the accident was a loss of lift and control caused by improper loading; contributing factors were the pilot's failure to follow operational standards, his poor flight planning which did not take proper weight and balance into account, and his failure to reject the takeoff when the plane would not climb.

== See also ==
- LaMia Flight 2933, another air crash involving a Brazilian football team
- List of accidents involving sports teams
