= Adhemar Santillo =

Brazilian politician (1939–2021)

Member of the Brazil Chamber of Deputies for Goiás
- In office 1975–1986

Member of the Legislative Assembly of Goiás
- In office 1971–1975

Mayor of Anápolis
- In office 1986–1989
- In office 1997–2001

Personal details
- Born: 13 November 1939; Ribeirão Preto, São Paulo, Brazil
- Died: 9 March 2021 (aged 81); Anápolis, Goiás, Brazil
- Political party: MBD; PMBD; PT; PSD; PP; PSDB

Adhemar Santillo (13 November 1939 – 9 March 2021) was a Brazilian politician and businessman.

== Biography ==
Ademar was the son of Virgínio Santillo and Elídya Maschietto Santillo. Born in Ribeirão Preto, his family settled in Anápolis in 1942. There, he helped found the Brazilian Democratic Movement in 1966 and worked for the city under the leadership of Jonas Ferreira Alves Duarte. He was elected to the Legislative Assembly of Goiás in 1970.

A member of the Chamber of Deputies from 1975 to 1986, he joined the restructured Brazilian Democratic Movement (PMDB) alongside his brother, Senator Henrique Santillo. For seven months, he was a member of the Workers' Party but later returned to the PMDB. In 1985, he was elected Mayor of Anápolis and joined the Social Democratic Party (PSD) due to a disagreement with prominent PMDB member Onofre Quinan. He left the office in 1989, returning in 1997 after defeating his brother. He was not reelected in 2002 and subsequently retired from politics.

Adhemar Santillo died of a pulmonary embolism in Anápolis on 9 March 2021, at the age of 81. Three months earlier, Santillo tested positive for COVID-19.
