= Mark Sebba =

British fashion entrepreneur (1948–2018)

Mark Sebba (1948–2018) was a British fashion entrepreneur, and CEO of Net-a-Porter from 2003 to 2014.

During his time at Net-a-Porter, Sebba launched The Outnet, Mr Porter, the in-house clothing brand Iris & Ink, and the magazine Porter.

Sebba was a trustee of the Victoria and Albert Museum. He was married to Anne Sebba, and they had three children.

He died from a heart attack on 23 July 2018 at his home in Crete, Greece.
