= Boquim =

Municipality in Sergipe, Brazil

- Municipality
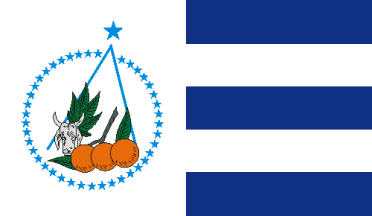
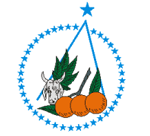
- Flag Coat of arms
- Interactive map of Boquim
- Coordinates: 11°08′49″S 37°37′15″W
- Country: Brazil
- Time zone: UTC−3 (BRT)

Boquim (Brazilian Portuguese: [boˈkĩ]) is a municipality in the Brazilian state of Sergipe. Its population was 26,899 (2020) and its area is 215 km^{2} (83 sq mi).

== See also ==
- List of municipalities in Sergipe
