= Pelé (2021 film) =

- Film poster
- Directed by: Ben Nichols; David Tryhorn
- Produced by: Kevin MacDonald; Jon Owen; Jonathan Rogers
- Distributed by: Netflix
- Release date: February 23, 2021
- Running time: 108 minutes
- Country: United Kingdom
- Language: Portuguese (Note: With some dialogue in English, French, German, Italian and Spanish)

Pelé is a 2021 biographical documentary film about Brazilian footballer Pelé. (Note: Pelé is the common byname of Edson Arantes do Nascimento.) The film was produced and distributed by Netflix and directed by Ben Nichols and David Tryhorn. Kevin MacDonald, Jon Owen, and Jonathan Rogers served as executive producers.

Pelé was released on February 23, 2021.

== Plot ==
The film describes the life of Pelé from his childhood, his soccer triumphs up until his last soccer station with the New York Cosmos soccer team. It includes lots of archival footage including his games, his and other interviews, news reels etc. The film sometimes also touches on the political background in Brasil, including the dictatorship. A lot of the soccer and other history is explained through contemporary interviews with him and other actors of the time, including family members, trainers, journalists and politicians.

== Reception ==
On Rotten Tomatoes, the documentary holds an approval rating of 82% based on 28 reviews, with an average rating of 6.40/10. Andrew Pulver for The Guardian, Charlotte O'Sullivan for the Evening Standard, Danny Leigh for the Financial Times, and Tara Brady for The Irish Times all awarded the film three out of five stars. Jordan Mintzer of The Hollywood Reporter described the film as a "polished and well-intentioned biography", but did not "inspire love and awe".
