= Abandonment of buffaloes in Brotas =

2021 incident at a farm in São Paulo, Brazil

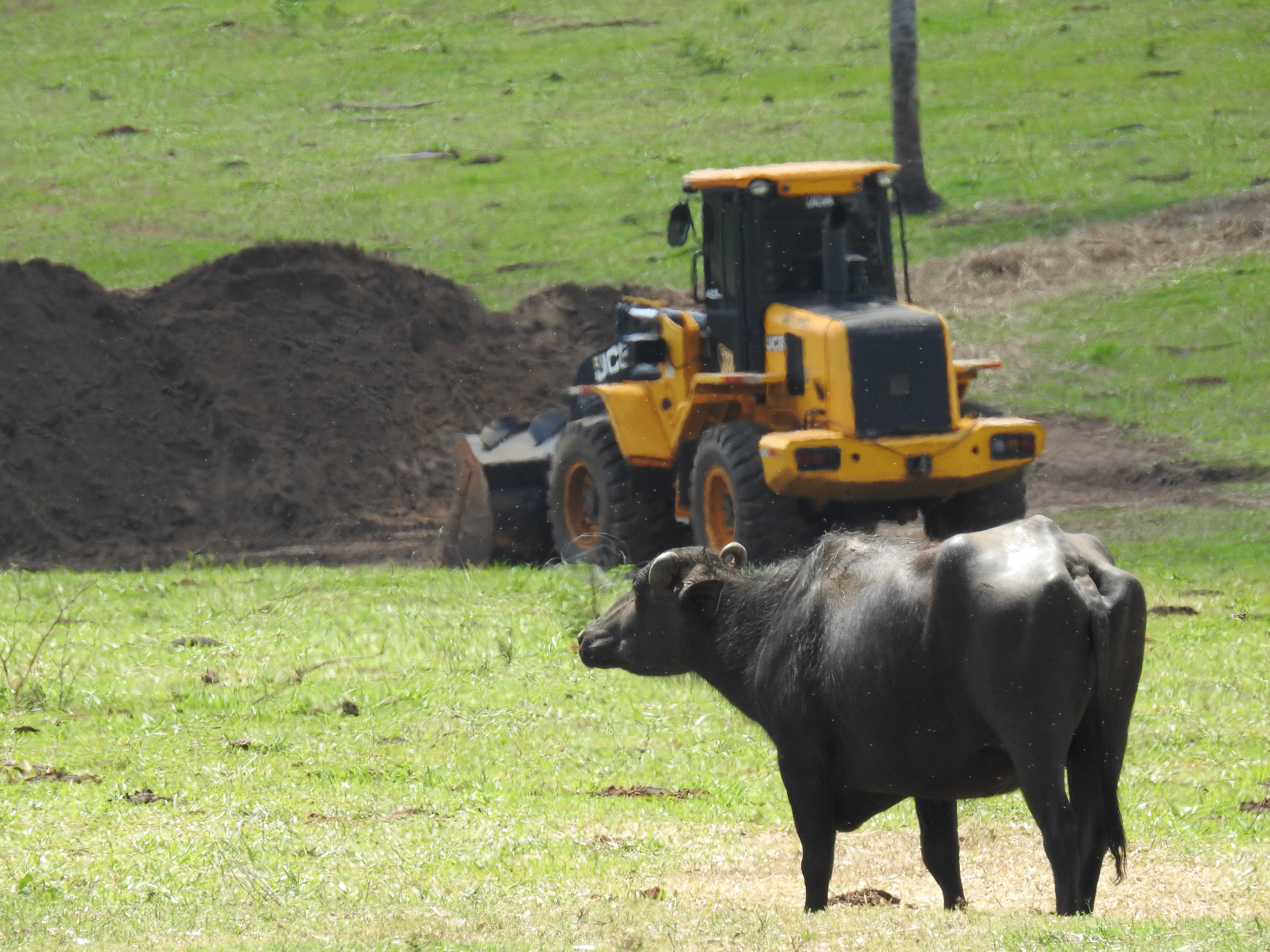
- Buffalo in front of an excavator used for digging holes at Fazenda Água Sumida
- Location: 22°10′59.99″S 48°11′44.56″W; São Luiz da Agua Sumida Farm
- Date: November 6, 2021
- Attack type: Crimes against Fauna
- Deaths: 137
- Injuries: 400
- Victim: Buffaloes
- Defender: Public justice
- Accused: Luiz Augusto Pinheiro de Souza
- Litigation: Court of Justice of São Paulo, in the Forum of Brotas
- Judge: Marcela Machado Martiniano

In November 2021, more than a thousand buffaloes were left abandoned on a farm in the Brazilian municipality of Brotas, causing deaths and leaving animals in a state of starvation. It has been treated by NGOs as one of the biggest cases of animal abuse ever recorded in the history of Brazil. According to the open process on the case, the farm was being leased for the cultivation of soy and turned the pastures into plantation fields leaving the animals adrift. Farmer Luiz Augusto Pinheiro de Souza, owner of the farm where the buffaloes were found, had previously been fined R$2.13 million for alleged mistreatment of the animals. Luiz Augusto Pinheiro de Souza also owns a restaurant in the same city, called Fatto di Bufala, which has spices and toppings such as cheese derived from the species among its menu.

== Case ==
In November 2021, the Civil Police of the municipality of Brotas received an anonymous report that at least 500 buffaloes were on the property without access to water and food. The buffaloes at Fazenda São Luiz da Água Sumida, a property on the border between the cities of Brotas and Ribeirão Bonito, then became news throughout Brazil. Investigations indicate that the owner of the farm, Luiz Augusto Pinheiro de Souza, a psychoanalyst and salesman of buffalo milk, left the animals to languish on the spot with no food and no water. The buffaloes, mostly pregnant, were dying and suffering miscarriages. In an interview with TV Globo's "Fantástico", de Souza stated that animals "Die naturally at a certain time of the year. When they die, they die". Luiz Augusto was arrested on November 11, when the police chief in charge of the case, Douglas Brandão do Amaral, stated that the day before the farmer had started to use a tractor in the area to ruin pasture that was still good. Douglas then added that: (...)we saw that his intention, I still don't know for what reason, was to kill these buffaloes. Faced with this direct intent, we decided to charge him with animal mistreatment in material competition, that is, each buffalo that is being mistreated there is a crime ".

We had a war scenario. We found 667 buffalo victims of abuse and another 22 that had already died and others in agony. We set up a task force with the support of city halls, veterinarians and NGOs to give water and food to the animals.

— Douglas do Amaral, Brotas Civil Police Chief

After the repercussions of the case, de Souza sent a message to the mayor of the city of Brotas, Leandro Corrêa (DEM), who said he felt intimidated by the message and promised to take the material to the police chief who is investigating the case.

Hi Leandro. It's Luiz Augusto. All good? You may hate me, and I have reason to hate you, but I think we've got a second right there on the line. Which is the image of Brotas. It will come out on Sunday at Fantástico. It's destroying the city. You as mayor can get this NGO out of here quickly...

— Luiz Augusto Pinheiro de Souza, owner of Fazenda Água Sumida

A police inquiry is being conducted to determine responsibility for the mistreatment of 1,056 buffaloes and 72 horses and mares on the Água Sumida farm. It is suspected that many animals were buried in ditches while still alive. Taken together, the crimes can result in 500 years in prison for those responsible and the fines imposed by the Environmental Police reach R$3.5 million. The Secretary of Agriculture of the city of Brotas, Luiz Fernando Braz da Silva, informed that the city hall has been following the buffalo case since the beginning and has been collaborating so that the animals are protected. The Regional Council of Veterinary Medicine of São Paulo, in turn, reported having activated the technical commissions for animal welfare and veterinary medicine to support the actions of NGOs in defense of farm animals.

You will see that this will not lead to anything.

— Luiz Augusto Pinheiro de Souza, when arrested in January 2022, after 39 days on the run, in the municipality of São Vicente
