= Jacarezinho, Rio de Janeiro =

Jacarezinho
- Neighborhood
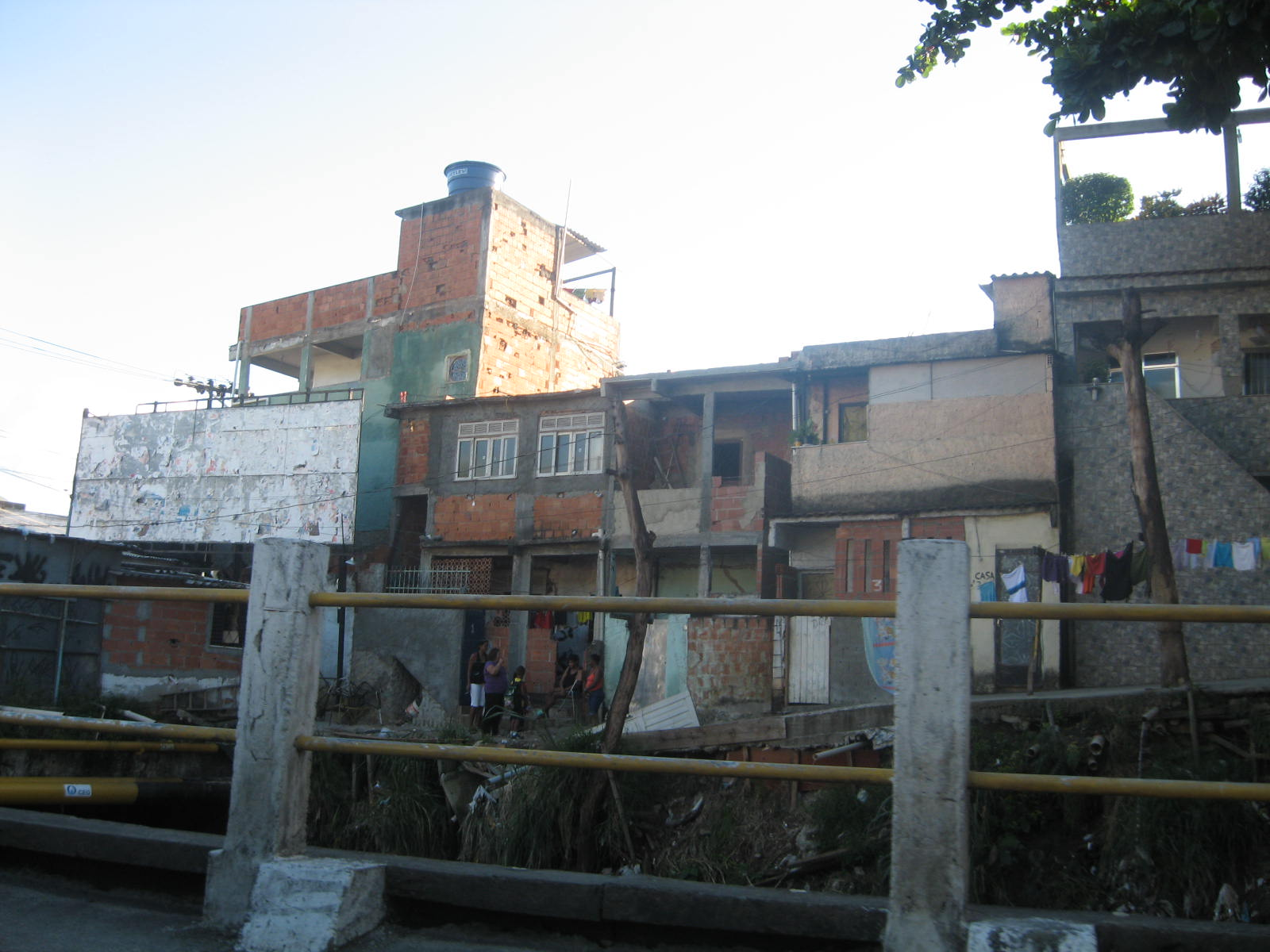

- Location in Rio de Janeiro

- Location within Brazil
- Coordinates: 22°53′13″S 43°15′37″W
- Country: Brazil
- State: Rio de Janeiro (RJ)
- Municipality/City: Rio de Janeiro
- Zone: North Zone

Population (2022)
  - Total: 35,458

Jacarezinho is a favela (Brazilian neighborhood) in Rio de Janeiro, with more than 60,300 residents living in an area of 40 hectares (99 acres). It is located in the North Zone of the city, and borders the neighborhoods of Jacaré, Méier, Engenho Novo and Triagem. It is the third-largest favela in Rio de Janeiro, behind Rocinha and Complexo do Alemão. The favela expanded as the city industrialized, and it became the biggest favela in Rio de Janeiro by the mid-20th century, with a population of 23,000 in 1960. The crucial element in its growth was the industrial boom in the nearby Méier district after World War II, according to the historian Julio Cesar Pino, author of a book about the favelas of Rio de Janeiro.

Jacarezinho suffers from problems that are common in favelas, including violence, poverty and drug dealing. In 2021, at least 25 people were killed in a shootout with police.

Jacarezinho means Little Jacaré, and it is named after the Jacaré River. Jacaré is also the Portuguese language name of the yacare caiman, but the river's name actually means tortuous or sinuous, and it is not named after the animal.

The favela's samba school is called Grêmio Recreativo Escola de Samba Unidos do Jacarezinho; it was founded on June 16, 1966. Its colors are pink and white.

The footballer Romário was born in Jacarezinho.
