= Ranule =

Brazilian footballer (1993–2021)

Personal information
- Full name: Ranule Gomes dos Reis
- Date of birth: 14 May 1993
- Place of birth: Várzea da Palma, Minas Gerais, Brazil
- Date of death: 24 January 2021 (aged 27)
- Place of death: Porto Nacional, Tocantins, Brazil
- Height: 1.86 m (6 ft 1 in)
- Position: Goalkeeper

Youth career
- –2013: Democrata-SL

Senior career*
Years	Team	Apps	(Gls)
2014–2015	Minas Boca	8	(0)
2015	Esportiva Guaxupé	5	(0)
2016	Nacional de Muriaé		
2016	Villa Nova-MG	5	(0)
2017	Atlético Itapemirim	13	(0)
2017–2018	Democrata-SL	26	(0)
2018	Tupi	0	(0)
2019	Resende	17	(0)
2019	Portuguesa-RJ	2	(0)
2020	Resende	9	(0)
2020	Sampaio Corrêa-RJ	8	(0)
2020–2021	Palmas	0	(0)
Total		93	(0)
- * Club domestic league appearances and goals

Ranule Gomes dos Reis (14 May 1993 – 24 January 2021), commonly known as Ranule, was a Brazilian footballer. He died in the 2021 Palmas FR plane crash.

== Career statistics ==
=== Club ===
Club	Season	League			State League		Cup		Other		Total	
Club	Season	Division	Apps	Goals	Apps	Goals	Apps	Goals	Apps	Goals	Apps	Goals
Minas Boca	2014	–			0	0	0	0	0	0	0	0
Minas Boca	2015	–			8 (Note: Appearances in the Campeonato Mineiro Módulo II)	0	0	0	0	0	8	0
Minas Boca	Total		0	0	8	0	0	0	0	0	8	0
Esportiva Guaxupé	2015	–			5 (Note: Appearances in the Campeonato Mineiro Segunda Divisão)	0	0	0	0	0	5	0
Villa Nova-MG	2016	Série D	5	0	0	0	0	0	0	0	5	0
Atlético Itapemirim	2017	–			13 (Note: Appearances in the Campeonato Capixaba)	0	0	0	0	0	13	0
Democrata-SL	2017	–			16	0	0	0	0	0	16	0
Democrata-SL	2018	–			10	0	0	0	0	0	10	0
Democrata-SL	Total		0	0	26	0	0	0	0	0	26	0
Resende	2019	–			17 (Note: Appearances in the Campeonato Carioca)	0	0	0	0	0	17	0
Portuguesa-RJ	2019	Série D	2	0	0	0	0	0	0	0	2	0
Resende	2020	–			9	0	0	0	0	0	9	0
Sampaio Corrêa-RJ	2020	–			8 (Note: Appearances in the Campeonato Carioca B2)	0	0	0	0	0	8	0
Palmas	2020	Série D	0	0	0	0	0	0	0	0	0	0
Career total			7	0	86	0	0	0	0	0	93	0
