= Guilherme Noé =

Brazilian footballer (1992–2021)

Personal information
- Full name: Guilherme Afonso Noé
- Date of birth: 5 April 1992
- Place of birth: São Paulo, Brazil
- Date of death: 24 January 2021 (aged 28)
- Place of death: Porto Nacional, Tocantins, Brazil
- Height: 1.86 m (6 ft 1 in)
- Position: Midfielder

Youth career
- –2010: Corinthians
- 2011: Osasco Audax
- 2011: → Internacional (youth loan)

Senior career*
Years	Team	Apps	(Gls)
2011	Osasco Audax	8	(0)
2012	Internacional	1	(0)
2013	Audax Rio	1	(0)
2014–2015	Tombense	1	(0)
2014	→ Nacional de Muriaé (loan)		
2015	Tupi	8	(0)
2015	Mirassol	0	(0)
2016	Batatais	19	(1)
2016	Caldense	7	(0)
2017	Rio Preto	13	(0)
2017–2018	São Bernardo	15	(0)
2019	Ipatinga	9	(0)
2019	Palmas	3	(0)
2020	Nacional-SP	6	(0)
2020	Democrata-GV	5	(0)
2020–2021	Palmas	0	(0)
Total		96	(1)
- * Club domestic league appearances and goals

Guilherme Afonso Noé (5 April 1992 – 24 January 2021) was a Brazilian footballer. He died in the 2021 Palmas FR plane crash.

== Career statistics ==
Club	Season	League			State League		Cup		Other		Total	
Club	Season	Division	Apps	Goals	Apps	Goals	Apps	Goals	Apps	Goals	Apps	Goals
Osasco Audax	2011	–			8 (Note: Appearances in the Campeonato Paulista A2)	0	0	0	0	0	8	0
Internacional	2012	Série A	0	0	1 (Note: Appearances in the Campeonato Gaúcho)	0	0	0	0	0	1	0
Audax Rio	2013	–			1 (Note: Appearances in the Campeonato Carioca)	0	0	0	0	0	1	0
Tombense	2014	Série D	0	0	0	0	0	0	0	0	0	0
Tombense	2015	Série C	1	0	0	0	0	0	0	0	1	0
Tombense	Total		1	0	0	0	0	0	0	0	1	0
Tupi	2015	Série C	0	0	8 (Note: Appearances in the Campeonato Mineiro)	0	0	0	0	0	8	0
Mirassol	2015	–			0	0	0	0	9 (Note: Appearances in the Copa Paulista)	0	9	0
Batatais	2016	–			19	1	0	0	0	0	19	1
Caldense	2016	Série D	7	0	0	0	0	0	0	0	7	0
Rio Preto	2016	–			13	0	0	0	0	0	13	0
São Bernardo	2017	Série D	6	0	0	0	0	0	0	0	6	0
São Bernardo	2018	–			9	0	0	0	4	0	13	0
São Bernardo	Total		6	0	9	0	0	0	4	0	19	0
Ipatinga	2019	–			9 (Note: Appearances in the Campeonato Mineiro - Módulo II)	0	0	0	0	0	9	0
Palmas	2019	Série D	3	0	0	0	0	0	0	0	3	0
Nacional-SP	2020	–			6 (Note: Appearances in the Campeonato Paulista A3)	0	0	0	0	0	6	0
Democrata-GV	2020	–			5	0	0	0	0	0	5	0
Palmas	2020	Série D	0	0	0	0	0	0	0	0	0	0
Career total			17	0	79	1	0	0	13	0	109	1
