= Abdul Hamid Sebba =

Brazilian politician (1934–2021)

Abdul Hamid Sebba (2 December 1934 – 9 April 2021) was a Brazilian lawyer and politician.

== Biography ==
He served as a member of the Legislative Assembly of Goiás from 1995 to 2007.

Hamid Sebba died of COVID-19 in Goiânia on 9 April 2021, at the age of 86.
