= José de Freitas =

Coordinates: 4°45′S 42°35′W

- Municipality
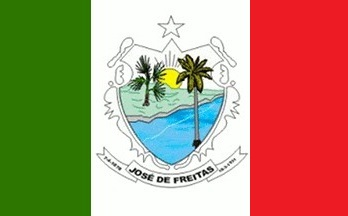
- Flag Coat of arms

- Country: Brazil
- Region: Nordeste
- State: Piauí
- Mesoregion: Centro-Norte Piauiense

Population (2020)
  - Total: 39,336
- Time zone: UTC−3 (BRT)

José de Freitas is a municipality in the state of Piauí in the Northeast region of Brazil.

== Tourism ==
Located in the metropolitan region of Grande Teresina, Barragem do Bezerro, in the county of José de Freitas, is one of the most sought after places, being a good option for rest, fishing and jet skiing. The place counts on tents to attend the visitors.

Morro do Fidié is a tourist attraction with great added value, enriching the tourist heritage of José de Freitas. It is a Project of the Municipal Secretariat of the Environment and Tourism - SEMAT, sponsored by the City Hall. At the top of the hill there is also a small viewpoint that gives visitors the view of the whole city and even the hills of Santo Antônio (Campo Maior).

In addition to the image of Christ, the viewpoint, the look of the city, the huge staircase, the image of the saint and the art of João Oliveira, and the natural trails, Morro do Fidié also has a memorial made up of Major Fidié's history and Battle of Jenipapo, and by the political history of the municipality of José de Freitas. The Morro staircase has 140 steps.

Religious tourism, rural tourism and event tourism attract many visitors to the county. In the rural area, rural tourism has gained strength in recent years, with population growth, accessibility and emergence of new ventures. Approximately 30 km from the municipality's headquarters, in Morada Nova community is located the Vila Pagã, a cultural and religious area that receives hundreds of visitors annually, who can camp, participate in cultural events, visit monuments, make trails and have contact with nature.

Another great attraction of José de Freitas is the Zé Pereira, the pre-carnival held annually, which attracts visitors from neighboring municipalities in a large party, where participants wear unusual masks and costumes. The celebration of the patron saint of the city, promoted by the Catholic Church, also occurs annually and attracts large numbers of faithful, moving religious tourism.

== See also ==
- List of municipalities in Piauí
