= Porto Nacional =

Municipality in Tocantins, Brazil

- Municipality
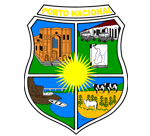
- Flag Coat of arms

- Location of Porto Nacional
- Coordinates: 10°42′28″S 48°25′01″W
- Country: Brazil
- Region: Norte
- State: Tocantins

Government
  - Mayor: Paulo Alves Mourão (PT)

Area
  - Total: 4,449.917 km^{2} (1,718.123 sq mi)

Population (2020)
  - Total: 53,316
  - Density: 11.04/km^{2} (28.6/sq mi)
- Time zone: UTC−3 (BRT)

Porto Nacional is a Brazilian municipality in the state of Tocantins. The population was 53,316 (2020) in an area of 4,450 km^{2} (1,720 sq mi), including both rural and urban areas.

== Geography ==
It is located approximately in the center of the state at a distance of 60 km. from the state capital of Palmas, which lies to the north on highway TO-050 Porto Nacional lies on the right bank of the important Tocantins River, which flows north to join the Araguaia River. Leaving from the capital of Goiás, Goiânia, it is located at a distance of 769 km, taking the BR-153 (Belém-Brasília) and then TO-255.

The city is served by Porto Nacional Airport.

== Economy ==
The main economic activities are cattle raising and the growing of crops like soybeans, pineapple, rice, mamona, corn, and sorghum.

- Cattle herd: 84,291

Planted area of main crops in 2006

- Pineapple: 70 ha.
- Soybeans: 13,000 ha.
- Rice: 2,000 ha.
- Mamona: 680 ha.
- Corn: 2,083 ha.
- Sorghum: 8,000 ha.
- Plantations of coconut, mango, and citrus fruits.

Farm data for 2006

- Total number of farms: 1,278
- Agricultural area: 129,098 ha.
- Planted area: 10,300 ha.
- Area of natural pasture: 70,101
- Persons working in agriculture: 3,300 (most were relatives of the owner of the farm)

== Health and education ==
- Number of health establishments (2005): 29
- Private health establishments: 10
- Hospitals: 1 with 81 beds
- Infant mortality rate:
- Number of schools: 59 primary schools and 10 middle schools. There were two institutes of higher learning with 688 students in 2006.
- Literacy rate: 79% (over 25 years old)
- Ranking on the Municipal Human Development Index: 0.750

== Climate ==
Climate data for Porto Nacional (1981–2010)
Month	Jan	Feb	Mar	Apr	May	Jun	Jul	Aug	Sep	Oct	Nov	Dec	Year
Mean daily maximum °C (°F)	31.7 (89.1)	32.0 (89.6)	31.8 (89.2)	32.9 (91.2)	33.9 (93.0)	34.3 (93.7)	34.9 (94.8)	36.4 (97.5)	36.5 (97.7)	34.5 (94.1)	33.0 (91.4)	32.2 (90.0)	33.7 (92.7)
Daily mean °C (°F)	26.0 (78.8)	26.1 (79.0)	26.1 (79.0)	26.9 (80.4)	27.1 (80.8)	26.2 (79.2)	26.3 (79.3)	27.8 (82.0)	28.9 (84.0)	27.8 (82.0)	27.0 (80.6)	26.5 (79.7)	26.9 (80.4)
Mean daily minimum °C (°F)	22.5 (72.5)	22.5 (72.5)	22.6 (72.7)	22.8 (73.0)	21.9 (71.4)	19.8 (67.6)	19.2 (66.6)	20.2 (68.4)	22.6 (72.7)	23.1 (73.6)	22.8 (73.0)	22.7 (72.9)	21.9 (71.4)
Average precipitation mm (inches)	255.7 (10.07)	237.9 (9.37)	269.3 (10.60)	166.3 (6.55)	47.7 (1.88)	3.1 (0.12)	1.0 (0.04)	5.2 (0.20)	50.3 (1.98)	141.6 (5.57)	186.9 (7.36)	257.7 (10.15)	1,622.7 (63.89)
Average precipitation days (≥ 1.0 mm)	18	16	18	11	4	0	0	0	4	9	14	15	109
Average relative humidity (%)	81.3	82.4	82.7	78.3	70.7	60.6	53.2	46.3	52.0	68.7	76.4	80.2	69.4
Mean monthly sunshine hours	141.7	135.6	141.2	187.9	255.9	271.9	290.0	278.7	191.6	174.5	163.1	144.6	2,376.7
Source: Instituto Nacional de Meteorologia

== See also ==
- List of municipalities in Tocantins
