= 2021 in radio =

The following is a list of events affecting radio broadcasting in 2021. Events listed include radio program debuts, finales, cancellations, and station launches, closures and format changes, as well as information about controversies.

== Notable events ==
=== January ===
| Date | Event | Source |
|---|---|---|
| 1 | The annual Vienna New Year's Concert is broadcast throughout Europe. Because of the COVID-19 pandemic there is no live audience, but the concert is able to go ahead because the orchestra's members have been COVID tested on a daily basis. | |
| 4 | On the occasion of its 75th anniversary, Queen Elizabeth II of the United Kingdom sends her best wishes to BBC Radio 4's magazine programme Woman's Hour. She praises the programme for having "played a significant part in the evolving role of women". | |
| 11 | US broadcasting company Cumulus Media issues a directive to its talk outlets that orders local and syndicated hosts avoid discussing anything to do with allegations of voter fraud on pain of dismissal. The move comes days after the events of the storming of the United States Capitol on January 6, seen to have been spurred on by conservative talkers Mark Levin and Dan Bongino, both vocal proponents of debunked election fraud theories. Ben Shapiro, though not employed by the company, is also listed in the memo. A host from Cumulus' KMJ—Fresno, Ray Appleton, is suspended. | |
| 12 | WMGG—Egypt Lake, Florida, turns off its analog operations and flips exclusively to digital, becoming the second AM radio station in the United States, following WWFD; unlike WWFD, WMGG has filed with the FCC to operate permanently as an all-digital station, the first station to request a permanent license. The station will maintain an analog FM translator. | |
| 15 | Proprietor Armando Calderón Lara surrenders the license for XHACM-FM, a station operating from Cárdenas, Tabasco, Mexico. The station closed down on January 31. | |
| 15 | CKEC-FM—New Glasgow switches to an adult contemporary format branded as 94.1 The Breeze. | |
| 18 | The Q network launches in the Maritime region of Canada as Stingray Radio rebrands four of its rock stations to the "Q" branding. CJMO-FM—Moncton drops its longtime "C103" branding and switches to that branding and CKEZ-FM—New Glasgow drops its "Zed" branding and joins the Q network. In addition, the syndicated morning show BJ & The Q Morning Crew expanded into New Glasgow. | |
| 25 | US broadcasting company Alpha Media files for Chapter 11 bankruptcy protection and plans to start a reorganization with its creditors and lenders. | |
| 25 | The "Jack" branding makes its way to Medicine Hat, Alberta as CJCY-FM switches to that branding. | |

=== February ===
| Date | Event | Source |
|---|---|---|
| 3 | Numerous country stations in the United States, including those owned by Cumulus Media and Entercom among others, pull Morgan Wallen's music from airplay after he was captured on video voicing a racial slur. In addition, he was suspended by his record labels, Big Loud and Republic Records along with being pulled from consideration for the Academy of Country Music Awards. | |
| 9 | Canada's Bell Media abruptly discontinues TSN Radio formats in CKOC-AM—Hamilton, CKST-AM—Vancouver, and CFRW-AM—Winnipeg (CFRW had recently lost its radio rights to the Winnipeg Jets) as part of an ongoing series of cuts across the company. The Hamilton station immediately flipped to BNN Bloomberg Radio (with its Tiger-Cats-produced programming moving to a new online-exclusive network), while the remaining two flipped to Bell's all-comedy format. | |
| 12 | Stingray Radio rebrands three of its radio stations in the Maritime Provinces, CIHI-FM—Fredericton, New Brunswick, CHHI-FM—Miramichi, New Brunswick and CIJK-FM—New Minas, Nova Scotia to the "Rewind" branding. | |
| 14 | After eight months of shutdown since May 5, 2020, ABS-CBN's radio station MOR Philippines relaunched as MOR Entertainment online, a service that will feature live programs daily on social networking site Facebook and Pinoy community app Kumu, podcasts on music streaming service Spotify, content exclusives on video-sharing platform YouTube and iWantTFC. | |
| 21 | Classic hip hop WJXN-FM—Utica/Jackson, Mississippi, flips to adult hits "Jack FM"; the station previously featured this format and branding from 2012 to 2014. | . |

=== March ===
| Date | Event | Source |
|---|---|---|
| 1 | Soft AC KJJZ—Palm Springs transitions to adult Top 40, serving as the de facto successor for the soon-to-be-sold KRCK-FM. | |
| 2 | KRUS (Ruston-Grambling) drops urban gospel for rhythmic Top 40 as "Hitz 96.3". | |
| 4 | WJSR—Richmond ends a five-month stunt with Christmas music and relaunches with classic hits "Awesome 100.9"; at the same time, adult Top 40 WURV—Richmond, Virginia rebranded as "103.7 Your Variety". | |
| 8 | Active rock WAPL—Appleton, Wisconsin fires morning host Len Nelson after he made critical comments about Rush Limbaugh on his Facebook page. Nelson later apologized for making the comments. | |
| 11 | KORL-FM HD3/K298BA—Honolulu, drops Nash Icon for smooth jazz. | |
| 15 | Classic rock KJOT—Boise flips to adult hits "Jack FM". | |
| 16 | The hosts of the syndicated radio program Free Talk Live are arrested on federal wire fraud charges for establishing a false religious institution to launder cryptocurrency. | |
| 19 | Hybrid sports/urban contemporary KGA/K278CY—Spokane, Washington drops all music programming and rejoins Fox Sports Radio as a full-time affiliate. | |
| 30 | Entercom rebrands as Audacy, Inc. and also rebrands its Radio.com platform under the Audacy name. | |

=== April ===
| Date | Event | Source |
|---|---|---|
| 1 | Rhythmic Top 40 WNRG-FM—Milwaukee switches to oldies WRXS "Pure Oldies 106.9". | |
| 1 | Rhythmic Top 40 KZCE—Phoenix reverts to classic hip hop "101.1 The Bounce." | |
| 1 | Classic country KGU—Honolulu returns to sports as "95.1 and AM 760 The Shark" | |
| 7 | Classic rock WGRF—Buffalo fired the program director and hosts of Morning Bull (Rob Lederman, Rich Gaenzler and Chris Klein) after on-air statements by Lederman on March 24, in which he compared how he likes toast to the skin tones of black women, set up a backlash from multiple advertisers who immediately pulled their spots from the station, and resulted in owner Cumulus Media placing the hosts on suspension the same day. Cumulus later moves Shredd and Ragan from active rock WEDG to WGRF in August. | |
| 16 | CHR KAMP-FM—Los Angeles rebrands as "97.1 NOW!" KNOU. | |
| 16 | Entravision's WNUE-FM—Deltona/Orlando dropped its Tropical/Salsa format and released the airstaff ahead of its flip to Christian AC under new owners Radio Training Network, thus sparking a pre-emptive strike from WPOZ over the use of the "Joy" moniker that RTN plan to use when it launched their format April 19, the same day WPOZ also rebranded with the aforementioned moniker. | |
| 19 | With the launch of a new local show The Morning Wake Up (hosted by Sean Tyler and Sasha Mack) replacing the cancelled syndicated Rick & Sasha, KMJK—Kansas City shifted directions from Adult R&B to urban contemporary, putting in line with rival KPRS. | |
| 20 | Clara Amfo is named as the new host of the Future Sounds programme on BBC Radio One. | |
| 21 | Talk KFAB—Omaha fires afternoon host Chris Baker after learning in a (since-deleted but archived) tweet that he posted a GIF of Black men in loincloths and spears dancing over the word "Guilty!" following the results of the trial of former Minneapolis Police Department officer Derek Chauvin, who was convicted for the murder of George Floyd in 2020 that led to multiple protests and calls for police reforms afterwards. | |

=== May ===
| Date | Event | Source |
|---|---|---|
| 15 | After 51 years, Dordt University transfers ownership of student-run Religious/Diversified KDCR—Sioux Center, Iowa, to Educational Media Foundation, then converts the station to its K-Love format. The station's programs and sports broadcast move to an online platform. | |
| 17 | WNYC Studios dismisses On the Media co-host Bob Garfield after an outside investigation reveals Garfield violated New York Public Radio's anti-bullying policy. | |
| 18 | Bell Media rebrands 25 of its radio stations to the "Bounce Radio" adult hits branding as part of a mass format reorganization. As a result of the rebranding, all of the remaining EZ Rock stations have been phased out. | |
| 21 | Stingray Radio rebrands two of its Top 40 stations, CHRK-FM—Sydney, Nova Scotia and CKIX-FM—St. John's, Newfoundland and Labrador, to the "Hot" branding. | |
| 22 | The Eurovision Song Contest 2021 grand final is broadcast live by radio stations such as ORF (Austria), BNR (Bulgaria), NDR, WDR (Germany), RTÉ (Ireland), RAI (Italy), RS (Serbia), RTVSLO (Slovenia), SR (Sweden) and the BBC (United Kingdom), as well as by stations in non-competing countries such as Slovakia. | |
| 24 | Czech Radio launches a new sport radio station on digital channels. | |
| 24 | Sports WFAS—White Plains, New York concurrently flips to conservative talk and ceased analog operations, opting to broadcast in HD Radio with no in-band on-channel analog transmission. WFAS becomes the new New York market outlet for multiple Westwood One shows including The Dan Bongino Show. | |
| 24 | Sports WHLD—Niagara Falls/Buffalo, New York also flips to conservative talk, but remains in analog unlike WFAS. | |
| 25 | Rhythmic classic hits WKAF—Brockton/Boston switches to Spanish Top 40 WZRM "Rumba 97.7", giving the market its first full-powered Spanish-language FM. | |
| 28 | US hip hop radio station KWQW—Des Moines switches to CHR. | |
| 28 | Alternative WHKF—Harrisburg flips to urban contemporary "Real 99.3". | |
| 29 | The Küçük Çamlıca TV Radio Tower in Istanbul, Turkey, is inaugurated, becoming the city's tallest structure. | |
| 31 | Belgian broadcaster RTBF Musiq'3 launches Le printemps selon Igor, a five-part 30-minute series in French about composer Igor Stravinsky, written and produced by Axelle Thiry and featuring Alexandre Tharaud. The series is made available to the whole of the EBU. | |

=== June ===
| Date | Event | Source |
|---|---|---|
| 1 | Classic hits KRKE-FM—Albuquerque switches to classic hip hop "101.3 The Hustle." | |
| 3 | Lotus Broadcasting acquires Sinclair Broadcast Group's Seattle-Tacoma properties, all-news KOMO and KOMO-FM, adult Top 40 KPLZ-FM, and conservative talk KVI, in an $18 million deal transaction. Sinclair acquired the Seattle radio stations as part of its 2013 acquisition of Fisher Communications. With this sale, it also ends a 68-year pairing of radio/TV co-ownership with ABC affiliate KOMO-TV as well as the last radio/TV combo to exist in Seattle. The stations were the only radio stations in Sinclair's portfolio, as it had previously divested its other stations in the 1990s. | |
| 14 | Classic hits WMQA-FM—Minocqua, Wisconsin switches to adult contemporary "95.9 The Island". | |
| 22 | WNMA—Miami Springs/Miami flips from sports/hot talk to Spanish Christian as "Radio Oasis 1210". | |
| 28 | Martz Communications Group sells its Upstate New York outlets, CHR WYUL—Chateaugay, and the Malone-licensed duo of oldies WICY and country WVNV, to Educational Media Foundation, allowing the religious broadcaster to border-blast its way into the Montreal market. | |

=== July ===
| Date | Event | Source |
|---|---|---|
| 5 | Adult album alternative WPFQ—Sylvester/Albany, Georgia changed formats to classic hits WJST "Retro 102.1"; the prior format is moved to an online presentation. | |
| 13 | The remaining radio stations operating in North America on 87.7 FM were forced to cease operations as the digital television transition in the United States completed its final phase. The stations (nicknamed "Franken-FMs") on 87.7 were legally analog low-power television stations whose audio subcarriers are audible on FM radios; the transition forced them to adopt either ATSC or ATSC 3.0. ATSC 3.0 is theoretically compatible with an analog subcarrier, and on June 13, the FCC granted Venture Technologies special temporary authority to continue operating two of its stations, KBKF-LD and WRME-LD, with an analog subcarrier on 87.75 MHz. Venture must report after 90 and 180 days any interference reports to the FCC. Three other stations were granted similar authority in the subsequent days. Several other Franken-FMs moved to AM radio following the transition; WJMF-LP's programming moved to WZQK, while WVOA-LP's moved to WSIV. | |
| 15 | Following similar moves to their Alternative and country stations in September 2020, Audacy restructures their 16 CHR-formatted stations, laying off most midday and afternoon hosts and replacing them with those of WBBM-FM—Chicago and KNOU—Los Angeles, respectively. | |
| 19 | Soft AC CKHY-FM—Dartmouth/Halifax, Nova Scotia flips to modern rock "Surge 105". | |
| 27 | The Federal Communications Commission auctioned off a series of new FM radio construction permits. Auction 109 also included the allocations for four AM radio stations in the St. Louis, Missouri, area previously owned by Entertainment Media Trust and had their licenses simultaneously revoked by the FCC in March 2020: KQQZ—Fairview Heights, Illinois, KZQZ—St. Louis, KFTK—East St. Louis, Illinois and WQQW—Highland, Illinois; neither of those allocations received a bid. | |
| 30 | Active rock CKLZ-FM—Kelowna, British Columbia, rebrands from "Power 104" to "The Lizard". | |

=== August ===
| Date | Event | Source |
|---|---|---|
| 2 | Malaysian media group Media Prima rebranded its two stations: Chinese-language One FM becomes 8FM, while Malay-language adult contemporary station Kool FM was reformatted as all-news/music station Buletin FM. | |
| 5 | Sirius XM Radio begins rerunning Let's Talk with Lucy, a former CBS Radio Network interview program that had aired from 1964 to 1965, for the first time since the show's first airing. The show will air on a dedicated pop-up channel commemorating the 110th birth anniversary of hostess Lucille Ball, who had recorded the program while starring in The Lucy Show for CBS television. Ball's daughter Lucie Arnaz had personally preserved the program archives. | |
| 10 | Westwood One renews its exclusive license with the NCAA to serve as the association's official radio partner. Terms of the agreement, which specifically covers the association's championships (the FCS (formerly I-AA) football championship, March Madness, NIT, Women's March Madness, College World Series, softball College World Series, men's lacrosse tournament and Frozen Four), were not disclosed. The renewal comes along with a settlement of the running dispute between the NCAA and Westwood One over the NCAA's cancellation of its spring 2020 sports championships and Westwood One's liabilities under the contract. | |
| 12 | CHR KFCO—Bennett/Denver reverts to classic hip hop "Flo 107.1". | |
| 16 | Urban AC KMJM-FM—Columbia, Illinois/St. Louis, Missouri switches to conservative talk "104.9 The Patriot". | |
| 25 | Country KHWK—Rushford/Winona, Minnesota, changes format to sports KWMN. | |

=== September ===
| Date | Event | Source |
|---|---|---|
| 3 | The Jim Pattison Group rebrands five of its radio stations to the "Rewind Radio" branding, including CKDV-FM—Prince George, British Columbia. | |
| 3 | Hot AC/CHR CIQC-FM—Campbell River, British Columbia, reverts to its "River" identity after 7 years with the "2Day" branding. | |
| 7 | Talk KFAQ—Tulsa, Oklahoma changes format to sports as KTSB "The Blitz 1170." | |
| 15 | WFLA simulcast WFLF-FM—Panama City, Florida begins stunting with Christmas music, ahead of a format flip to active rock; the simulcast is moved to WPAP-HD2 and two FM translators. | |
| 16 | Thirteen years after the duo broke up in 2008, former nationally syndicated morning hosts Steve and DC reunite on WFFN—Tuscaloosa, Alabama, as DC Daniel joins the station where Steve Shannon had been working since 2016. | |
| 24 | CHR WFLC—Miami flips to rhythmic hot AC, retaining the "Hits 97.3" brand. | |
| 24 | Classic hits KIIK-FM—DeWitt, Iowa, flips to country "US 104.9", while classic rock KCQQ—Davenport, Iowa flips to classic hits "Big 106.5". | |
| 29 | Chicago Public Media, the owners of WBEZ, signed a non-binding letter of intent to acquire the Chicago Sun-Times. The purchase, which would come from major philanthropic organizations and public support, is expected to close before the end of 2021, pending approval from the regulators and CPM's board of directors. | |
| 30 | After dropping their AAA format after 31 years four days prior, KTHX-FM—Reno, Nevada flips to adult hits as "We 100.1". | |

=== October ===
| Date | Event | Source |
|---|---|---|
| 1 | Ideastream Public Media, owner of NPR/jazz WCPN—Cleveland, takes over operations of Kent State University's NPR/classical WKSU—Kent, Ohio, via a public service operating agreement. The agreement was finalized on September 15 after weeks of private negotiations and had roots in a Corporation for Public Broadcasting grant awarded to both stations in 2020 to help increase local news coverage. Plans are announced to merge WCPN and WKSU's programming and to swap formats and calls with WCPN and classical WCLV—Lorain, Ohio, all before April 1, 2022, returning WCLV's format to a full-market signal for the first time since 2001. | |
| 1 | For the third consecutive year, oldies WWIZ—West Middlesex, Pennsylvania/Youngstown, Ohio becomes the first non-stunting station in North America to flip to Christmas music. WWIZ's flip came hours after WXMS—Au Sable, New York, as part of a change in management, flipped to the format as a temporary stunt. | |
| 11 | Sports WCPV—Plattsburgh, New York, changes to country "101.3 the Wolf", with the sports format moving to WEAV. | |
| 13 | Soft AC CHUP-FM—Calgary, Alberta flips to adult Top 40 "C97.7". | |
| 13 | Classic hits/rock CHIQ-FM—Winnipeg dismisses all on-air staff and begins stunting until October 18, relaunching as CHNW AC/hot AC "Now! Radio". | |
| 15 | After 35 years of alternative rock, KITS—San Francisco changes to adult hits "105.3 Dave FM". | |
| 18 | Rogers Media re-brands all its all-news and talk stations to the CityNews Radio branding, including CJNI-FM—Halifax, Nova Scotia (which is otherwise not served directly by a Citytv affiliate). | |
| 22 | Country WNSH—Newark/New York City, originally the flagship of Cumulus Media's Nash brand, flips to classic hip hop as WXBK "94.7 The Block". The change results in the New York metropolitan area without a full-time country format for the first time since WNSH's 2013 sign-on. | |
| 25 | Hot AC WDVI—Rochester, New York flips to country as "Country 100.5". | |
| 27 | The Green Bay Packers sign a new affiliation deal with sports WRNW—Milwaukee beginning with the team's forthcoming 2022 season. This ends a 91-year relationship between the team and talk WTMJ/W277CV—Milwaukee as the team's de facto flagship station, believed to have been one of the longest in the NFL, professional sports and American radio. | |

=== November ===
| Date | Event | Source |
|---|---|---|
| 4 | ESPN Radio affiliate WONN-FM—York, Pennsylvania switches to CHR "Nu 92.7" WNUU. | |
| 9 | Alternative rock WQEN-HD3—Birmingham, Alabama loses its analog FM relay as W256CD (99.1 FM) is sold to Way Media and joins the WAY-FM Network. | |
| 15 | Lansing Community College's WLNZ is resurrected as a Michigan Radio affiliate, 20 months after shutting down due to the COVID-19 pandemic. | |
| 22 | WNYZ-LP Signs on the Air again, slowly converting into a Digital Signal until December 28 where it changed its call sign to WNYZ-LD. | |
| 24 | Alternative rock WZDA—Beavercreek/Dayton begins stunting with Christmas music as "Christmas 103.9". | |
| 29 | Mainstream rock WQRS—Olean, New York flips to classic rock "98.3 The Goat". It's the stations third go around with the format when the station used the moniker 98 Rocks from the late 1990s until 2006 and again in 2013. | |
| 29 | Tyler Media fired a pair of hosts from its Oklahoma City cluster, sports KRXO-FM afternoon co-host Sam Mayes and AC KMGL morning co-host and cluster Promotions Director Cara Rice, after a leaked audio from 2016 was released (via the social media site Lost Ogle) making off-the-air comments about Native Americans, which included racist stereotypical jokes towards the community in general while they were discussing the controversy over the name changing of the Washington Football Team (when they were called the Redskins at the time), and while discussing the topic, predicted that they would lose their jobs if the conversation was leaked. | |

=== December ===
| Date | Event | Source |
|---|---|---|
| 6 | Two days after being fired from CNN over a scandal involving his brother, former New York Governor Andrew Cuomo, Chris Cuomo leaves his SiriusXM program Let's Get After It. | |
| 6 | CHR KNOU—Los Angeles becomes KNX-FM, a simulcast of all-news KNX, ending a 12-year run with CHR and bringing the all-news format to the FM dial in Los Angeles for the first time. No KNOU announcers are dismissed as many had already been voice-tracking their air shifts from other markets. | |
| 14 | US Talk/sports KVON—Napa, California, flips to Spanish-language programming; some of KVON's programming is moved to KVYN—St. Helena. | |
| 16 | Philippines radio station DXKE-FM goes off air because of typhoon damage. It would return in January 2022 on a new frequency, under the name RMN iFM Surigao. | |
| 20 | After a 10-year absence, US station WTPA-FM's call letters and rock format returns, this time on 93.5. It was previously on 104.1 for 23 years from 1962 until 1985. Its rock format debuted in 1980, then moved to 93.5 in 1985 where it stood for 26 years, and finally moved to 92.1 for seven years before that facility was sold to EMF in 2018. This will be the station's second go around with the rock format. | |
| 22 | US Classic country station WOWQ—Waverly, Tennessee, flips to adult hits. | |
| 26 | After stunting with Christmas music, and ending a 46-year run with Top 40 in various incarnations, US station KYYY—Bismarck flips to Mainstream AC (and thus returns to a previous direction for the first time since 2011), billing itself as "Mix 92.9." | |
| 27 | After stunting for a month with Christmas music, US station WZDA—Beavercreek/Dayton relaunches with a country format. | |
| 29 | US Conservative talk station WTJS—Jackson, Tennessee, flips to contemporary Christian "Good News 93.1". | |
| 30 | After a 13-year gap, smooth jazz returned to the Milwaukee airwaves in the US, courtesy of WJTI/W273DQ. The regional Mexican format ("Caliente 97.9") continues to broadcast on sister W250BN via WMYX-FMHD3. | |

== Debuts ==
| Date | Event | Source |
|---|---|---|
| January 8 | WKEY-FM—Key West, Florida launches as dance "93.7 NRG". | |
| January 20 | DWDM-FM branded as "Eagle FM 95.5" as a classic hits station. | |
| January 25 | Audacy launches the BetQL Audio Network, which will focus on sports betting 24/7. The launch comes after the purchasing of the QL Gaming Group in November 2020. Former Adult Standards KEZW Denver (who'll serve as the flagship station) and KCBS-FM HD3 are announced as the first full time affiliates of the network. | |
| February 1 | CIWE-FM is launched by the Aboriginal Multi-Media Society (AMMSA), targeting northern Alberta's First Nations communities. | |

== Endings ==
| Date | Event | Source |
|---|---|---|
| January 1 | The daily mock commentary series Earl Pitts, Uhmerikun ends its original run with the retirement of Pitts's voice actor Gary Burbank. Reruns of past Pitts commentaries ran on his affiliates through 2021. | |
| February 9 | TSN Radio begins to wind down its operations. The Bell Media-owned Canadian sports radio network was one of several casualties of cutbacks at Bell and will be replaced by BNN Bloomberg business talk or comedy radio on stations in Winnipeg (CFRW), Vancouver (CKST and CFTE) and Hamilton (CKOC). While the sports rights for the Vancouver and Winnipeg stations had already been dispersed prior to the shutdown, the sudden announcement left Hamilton's sports teams, including the Hamilton Tiger-Cats, Hamilton Bulldogs and McMaster Marauders; scrambling to find new homes for its audio broadcasts (the Tiger-Cats later rejoined their longtime radio home at CHML). For the time being, the TSN Radio stations in other cities will retain their formats. | |
| April 14 | Radio Disney shuts down. The youth-friendly contemporary hit radio service switched to "best-of" programming without disc jockeys on January 1; on the same day, its companion country music service shut down, with its over-the-air affiliate KRDC flipping back to the main Radio Disney service until the shutdown. The station was pulled off of SiriusXM satellite radio on December 31, 2020 (eventually being replaced by "Disney Hits," which exclusively carries music produced by The Walt Disney Company) but the station continued to stream on its app and iHeartRadio until January 22 and March 13 respectively, and on KRDC until April 14. | |
| April 16 | Cumulus Media cancelled the syndicated Adult R&B morning program Rick & Sasha after two years. The displaced stations that carried the program filled their slots with other shows. | |
| June 26 | After 24 years, Sean "Hollywood" Hamilton ends production on his three countdown programs, the Mainstream and rhythmic versions of The Weekend Top 30 and The Remix Top 30. Hamilton will continue to focus on his afternoon program at WKTU—Lake Success/New York City, along with voicetracking for radio outlets and develop future projects. | |
| December 30 | Cumulus Media signed off and surrendered the license of CBS Sports Radio affiliate KXZZ—Lake Charles, Louisiana after 74 years on the air. | |
| December 31 | Agricultural/Farm/Information KDKD—Clinton, Missouri will sign off the air on this date due to the owners of the transmitter farm where it is located announced it will shut down and decommission the tower. Its programming will move over to country sister KDKD-FM and Kansas City Royals broadcasts to rock sister KXEA, ending the AM's longtime association that began with the team's debut in 1969. | |
| December 31 | WFLO & WFLO-FM Farmville, Virginia will cease operations on this date. Both stations were sold to Educational Media Foundation in January, awaiting FCC approval. | |
| December 31 | KOGT Orange, Texas will cease operations. | |

== Deaths ==
| Date | Name | Age | Nationality and notability | Source |
|---|---|---|---|---|
| January 11 | Maria Kastrisianaki | 72 | Greek journalist and broadcaster (Flight of the Condor) | |
| January 23 | Larry King | 87 | American radio and television host (WIOD, syndicated Larry King Show) | |
| February 11 | Eli Soriano | 73 | Filipino televangelist (Ang Dating Daan). | |
| February 17 | Rush Limbaugh | 70 | American broadcaster credited with popularizing conservative talk as a viable radio format with his nationally syndicated eponymous program | |
| February 23 | Mark de Brouwer | 50 | Dutch DJ (Radio 10 Gold). He also worked for BNR en Radio M Utrecht. | |
| March 1 | Rossella Panarese | 80 | Italian radio personality, programme editor, and speaker (Radio3 Scienza) | |
| March 3 | Diego Gómez | 84 | Spanish journalist and broadcaster (Estrellas de la Copla, El patio de Radiolé) | |
| March 4 | DJ Adviser | —N/a | Ghanaian DJ (Happy FM) | |
| March 5 | Michael Stanley | 72 | American musician (Michael Stanley Band), and TV/Radio personality in the Cleveland market | |
| March 6 | Peter "Kane" Deibler | 43 | Host of the Premiere Networks syndicated The Kane Show, based in iHeartMedia's WIHT Washington, D.C. The Kane Show aired from 2006 to 2020 in Baltimore/Washington, Louisville, and Tampa. | |
| March 16 | Laura Hermosa | 92 | Filipina actress, radio voice talent and mother of Tessie Tomas | |
| March 18 | Michel Alberganti | 65 | French radio producer, writer, and journalist | |
| March 25 | Rick Azar | 91 | American sportscaster (WHLD, WLHC, WWKB, Buffalo Bills Radio Network, Sabres Hockey Network) | |
| March 30 | Claire dela Fuente | 62 | Filipino Jukebox Singer | |
| March 30 | G. Gordon Liddy | 90 | American political operative and syndicated conservative talk radio host/shock jock | |
| April 3 | Ralph Stair | 87 | American Pentecostal evangelical pastor (Faith Cathedral Fellowship) and radio preacher (The Overcomer Ministry) | |
| April 9 | Totoy Talastas | 92 | Former Veteran Broadcast journalist, and host of Liwanagin Natin on (DZEC Radyo Agila 1062) and (NET 25) | |
| April 20 | Germán Gamonal | 88 | Chilean political journalist and radio presenter | |
| April 22 | Edwin Sevidal | 49 | Field Reporter of (DZMM) | |
| April 22 | Roy Masters | 92 | English-born American hypnotist and radio businessman (hosted Advice Line from 1961 until his death, founder of Talk Radio Network and Chancellor Broadcasting) | |
| April 23 | Victor Wood | 75 | Filipino Jukebox Singer | |
| April 24 | Bob Fass | 87 | American radio host (Radio Unnameable on WBAI and briefly WFMU) | |
| May 19 | Guillermo Aguirre | 40 | Argentine disc jockey | |
| May 20 | Zion Aquino | 42 | Filipino singer | |
| May 22 | Moti Rosenblum | 75 | Israeli journalist | |
| May 24 | Aldo Forbice | 80 | Italian radio host and journalist | |
| May 26 | Tom Shannon | 82 | American radio host most famous for his stints in his native Buffalo, New York (WKBW, WHTT-FM) and in Windsor, Ontario, Canada (CKLW). Also co-wrote the top-40 hit "Wild Weekend" | |
| May 27 | Edi Finger | 72 | Austrian sports journalist (Radio Wien) | |
| May 31 | Ester Chavez | 93 | Filipina radio and TV actress | |
| June 2 | David Rehling | 72 | Danish lawyer and journalist. | |
| June 2 | Herman Stok | 93 | Dutch radio and television presenter (VARA). | |
| June 4 | Yentez Quintoy | 39 | Executive Secretary of Brigada Group of Companies | |
| June 23 | Shalala | 61 | Filipino TV host, comedian, radio personality and actor | |
| July 27 | Menchu Álvarez del Valle | 93 | Spanish radio journalist. | |
| August 6 | Jakob Skarstein | 100 | Norwegian journalist and radio presenter | |
| August 7 | Jane Withers | 95 | American child radio star and character actress | |
| August 17 | Jun Del Rosario | 62 | Filipino News anchor and reporter | |
| August 20 | Tom T. Hall | 85 | American country singer-songwriter (radio personality on various rural West Virginia and Kentucky radio stations in the 1960s, member of the Grand Ole Opry) | |
| August 21 | Don Everly | 84 | American singer, half of The Everly Brothers (appeared as "The Everly Family" on KMA and WIVK in the 1940s, briefly members of the Grand Ole Opry in the late 1950s) | |
| August 21 | Phil Valentine | 61 | American conservative talk radio host | |
| September 8 | Amobé Mévégué | 52 | Cameroonian journalist and radio host | |
| September 26 | Chris Ho | —N/a | Singaporean singer (Zircon Lounge), musician and radio DJ | |
| October 4 | Alan Kalter | 78 | American radio and television announcer | |
| October 28 | Mike Trivisonno | 74 | American talk radio host, best known for his work at WTAM in Cleveland, Ohio | |
| November 1 | Ralph Guild | 93 | American radio businessman (McGavren Guild Radio, Interep) and former group owner (Atlantic States Industries) | |
| November 11 | Phyllis Webb | 94 | Canadian poet and radio broadcaster | |
| November 13 | Sam Huff | 87 | American football linebacker and color commentator (New York Giants and Washington Football Team) | |
| November 20 | Abdiaziz Mohamud Guled | —N/a | Somali journalist (Radio Mogadishu) | |
| December 1 | Josep Maria Francino | 74 | Spanish radio journalist | |
| December 1 | Almerindo Marques | 81 | Portuguese businessman, president of Rádio e Televisão de Portugal 2002–2008 | |
| December 4 | Stonewall Jackson | 89 | American country musician (member of the Grand Ole Opry from 1956 until his death) | |
| December 14 | Giorgos Tragas | 72 | Greek journalist and radio presenter | |
| December 18 | Enzo Gusman | 74 | Maltese singer (Malta Cable Radio) | |
| December 22 | Dmitry Zimin | 88 | Russian radio scientist and businessman | |
| December 25 | Richard Marcinko | 81 | American Navy SEAL, founding commander of SEAL Team Six; radio work included America on Watch for Talk Radio Network | |
| December 25 | Paul B. Kidd | 76 | Australian radio host and writer | |
| December 28 | John Madden | 85 | American football coach, video game consultant and sportscaster; radio work included The Madden Minute for KCBS and Westwood One | |
| December 31 | Jeanine Ann Roose | 84 | American child radio actress | |

== See also ==
- 2021 in British radio
