= WFLO =

WFLO could refer to:

- WFLO (AM), a radio station (870 AM) licensed to Farmville, Virginia, United States
- WFLO-FM, a radio station (95.7 FM) licensed to Farmville, Virginia, United States
