= WPAC (FM) =

Radio station in Ogdensburg, New York

- Ogdensburg, New York; United States
- Broadcast area: St. Lawrence County
- Frequency: 98.7 MHz
- Branding: PAC 98.7

Programming
- Language: English
- Format: Oldies

Ownership
- Owner: Stephens Media Group; (Stephens Media Group Ogdensburg, LLC)
- Sister stations: WNCQ-FM, WYSX

History
- First air date: April 1, 1998 (28 years ago)
- Former call signs: WZEA (1997–1998); WYSX (1998–2004)

Technical information
- Licensing authority: FCC
- Facility ID: 77827
- Class: A
- ERP: 6,000 watts
- HAAT: 100 meters (330 ft)
- Transmitter coordinates: 44.579°N 75.514°W

Links
- Public license information: Public file; LMS
- Webcast: Listen live
- Website: pac987fm.com

WPAC (98.7 MHz) is a commercial FM radio station licensed to Ogdensburg, New York, and serving St. Lawrence County. It is owned by Stephens Media Group and broadcasts an oldies radio format.

WPAC has an effective radiated power (ERP) of 6,000 watts.

== History ==
WPAC began broadcasting on April 1, 1998, as WZEA. WZEA featured a contemporary hit radio (CHR) format as "Zed 98-7." The station kept the format, but switched calls to WYSX (as "Yes FM") a short time later as a three-way simulcast with sister stations WYSI (96.7, now WYSX) in Canton (now WYSX) and WYUL (94.7, now WQLR) in Chateaugay.

The simulcast with WYSI ended in July 2005, when 98.7 switched to the current oldies format with the WPAC calls; the "Yes FM" name and WYSX calls moved to 96.7. WYUL became a separately-programmed CHR station.

The station was previously owned by Martz Communications Group, and was acquired by Stephens as of February 1, 2008.
