= Aldo Forbice =

Italian radio host and journalist (1940–2021)

- Born: 23 September 1940; Catania, Italy
- Died: 24 May 2021 (aged 80); Rome, Italy
- Occupations: Radio host, author, and journalist

Aldo Agatino Forbice (23 September 1940 – 24 May 2021) was an Italian radio host and journalist. As a radio host he was most well known for hosting the Rai Radio 1 program Zapping from 1994 to 2012. He was also an author of long-form essay novels, poetry compilations, and several fiction books, many of which won literary awards in Italy.

== Early life ==
Forbice was born in Catania in 1940. He joined the newspaper Avanti! in the early 1960s as a writer.

== Career ==
=== As a radio host ===
Forbice joined Rai News24 by the late 1960s and was in charge of the work-focused Turno C program by 1970. Then, he joined the parent company TG1 as a regional office coordinator and eventually became director for the TG3 television channel by the 1980s. It was not until 1994 that he would be in charge of another program of his own, titled Zapping, that he would continue to host as a daily show until 2012. In an interview with Il Giornale in October 2012, Forbice described how he had been ousted from his position in Rai News due to conflicts with executives in the company over long-term political statements made on the Zapping program.

=== As an author ===
While having written a number of non-fiction books and published poetry compilations, Forbice's first fiction novel was Fuori del coro, released in 2016 and covers the story of a controversial radio host investigating a woman's mysterious suicide. However, the book itself also contains poetry interludes and inserts of an essay format that discuss how the fictional content relates to the non-fictional issues of human rights abuses in the world.

== Awards and honors ==
The special jury award for the 2001 Camaiore Literary Prize in the category of contemporary poetry was given to Forbice for his book Bagnomaria. His other poetry works won a number of awards, including the 2002 Laurentum prize, the 2004 S. Domenico prize, the 2006 Circe-Sabaudia prize, and the 2007 Albatros prize. The Associazione Amici della Musica of Alcamo gave the 2009 International Culture Award to Forbice for his journalism work and focus on helping women and children and speaking out on issues of world hunger, genocide, and other political topics. His first fiction book, Fuori dal Coro, won the 2017 Amerigo delle Quattro libertà prize in fiction.

== Personal life ==
Throughout his life, Forbice worked with the Italian General Confederation of Labour and other trade unions to support their work improvement efforts. He had a long history with the Italian Labour Union and using his press career to promote labor initiatives. He founded the monthly magazine Lavoro e Società (Work and Society) in the 1980s, focused on discussing work issues in politics, society, and international economics. At the same time, he also encouraged artistic and social measures, helping to set up an exhibition to support AIDS initiatives and local community development. Forbice died in Rome on 24 May 2021, aged 80.

== Bibliography ==
- — (1968). I socialisti e el sindacato [The socialists and the trade union] (in Italian). Palazzi.
- — (1973). La federazione CGIL, CISL, UIL fra storia e cronaca [The CGIL, CISL, UIL federation between history and news] (in Italian). Bertani.
- —; Chiaberge, Riccardo (1975). Il sindacato dei consigli [The union of councils] (in Italian). Bertani.
- —; Benvenuto, Giorgio (1977). Austerità e democrazia operaia [Austerity and workers' democracy] (in Italian). SugarCo.
- —; Brodolini, Giacomo; Boni, Piero (1979). Dalla parte dei lavoratori [On the side of the workers] (in Italian). Lerici.
- — (1981). Scissioni sindacali e origini della UIL [Trade union splits and origins of the UIL] (in Italian). Lavoro italiano.
- — (1984). La forza tranquilla: Bruno Buozzi, sindacalista riformista [The quiet force: Bruno Buozzi, reformist trade unionist] (in Italian). Franco Angeli. ISBN 9788820446512.
- —; Sestini, Giampietro (1984). Pensioni oggi e domani [Pensions today and tomorrow] (in Italian). Franco Angeli. ISBN 9788820446413.
- —; Fornari, Giancarlo (1985). I bugiardi del fisco [The liars of the taxman] (in Italian). Adnkronos libri.
- — (1985). L'immagine della UIL dal 1950 agli anni 80 [The image of the UIL from 1950 to the 1980s] (in Italian). Lavoro Italiano.
- —; Tobagi, Walter (1989). Testimone scomodo [Inconvenient witness] (in Italian). Franco Angeli. ISBN 9788820434786.
- — (1990). Il sindacato nel dopoguerra: Scissioni della Cgil e nascita della Uil e della Cisl (1945-1953) [The union after the war: Splits of the CGIL and birth of the UIL and the CISL (1945–1953)] (in Italian). Franco Angeli.
- —; Oliva, Achille Bonito (1991). Artisti, mercato & società [Artists, market & society] (in Italian). Mondadori Education.
- —; Paternesi, Alessio; Giuffrè, Guido (1994). Il risveglio d'Europa [The awakening of Europe] (in Italian). Edicigno.
- — (1997). Sisifo ovvero zapping [Sisyphus or Zapping] (in Italian). Campanotto. ISBN 9788845699801.
- — (1998). Intervista al Duemila [Interview of the 2000s] (in Italian). RAI Libri. ISBN 9788839710185.
- —; Scaglione, Daniele (1999). Fai la cosa giusta! Donne nel mondo: Le nuove frontiere dei diritti umani [Do the right thing! Women in the world: The new frontiers of human rights] (in Italian). Regione Toscana.
- — (2000). Tutti gli uomini della rete [All the men on the net] (in Italian). RAI Libri. ISBN 9788887995107.
- — (2002). I signori della morte [The lords of death] (in Italian). Sperling & Kupfer. ISBN 9788820031633.
- — (2004). Orrori [Horrors] (in Italian). Sperling & Kupfer. ISBN 9788820036461.
- — (2004). Trentasette poesie d'amore e di morte [Thirty-seven poems of love and death] (in Italian). Libri Scheiwiller. ISBN 9788876443916.
- — (2005). La coda del coccodrillo [The tail of the crocodile] (in Italian). Libri Scheiwiller. ISBN 9788876444746.
- —; Costanzo, Ezio (2005). I bambini e la guerra [Children and war] (in Italian). RAI Libri. ISBN 9788839713582.
- —; Zavoli, Sergio (2006). Silone (in Italian). Ibiskos. ISBN 9788878411852.
- — (2006). La grande ombra [The big shadow] (in Italian). Sciascia. ISBN 9788882412173.
- — (2009). Assassini di stato [State assassins] (in Italian). Garzanti. ISBN 9788811600817.
- —; Mazzuca, Giancarlo (2009). I faraoni [And the pharaohs] (in Italian). Edizioni Piemme. ISBN 9788856600179.
- — (2010). Puliamo il futuro [Let's clean up the future] (in Italian). Guerini e associati. ISBN 9788862501354.
- —; Slocchini, Fabrizio (2010). Silenzi opprimenti [Overwhelming silence] (in Italian). Edizioni Banca di Teramo.
- — (2013). La vita, nonostante [Life, despite] (in Italian). Passigli. ISBN 9788836813605.
- — (2013). Io, ingegner Terrone: Vita controcorrente di un imprenditore del Sud [Me, engineer Terrone: Life against the tide of a Southern entrepreneur] (in Italian). LOG Edizioni. ISBN 9788898072040.
- —; Schittulli, Francesco (2014). Con il nastro rosa: Storie di donne che si sono riprese il futuro [With pink ribbon: Stories of women who have taken back the future] (in Italian). Piemme. ISBN 9788856636161.
- — (2016). Lieve sarà il peso: Trenta poesie recenti [The weight will be light: Thirty recent poems] (in Italian). Plumelia. ISBN 9788898731220.
- — (2016). Fuori dal coro [Out of the choir] (in Italian). Dario Flaccovio. ISBN 9788857906294.
- — (2017). Il tempo siamo noi [We are the time] (in Italian). Ibiskos Ulivieri. ISBN 9788832720112.
- — (2018). Il viaggio dell'ingegner Terrone: Il pericoloso percorso di un coraggioso imprenditore del sud [The journey of the engineer Terrone: The dangerous path of a brave entrepreneur from the south] (in Italian). Guerini e Associati. ISBN 9788862507165.
- — (2021). Comprare moglie: Cronache di schiavitù e violenza [Buy wife: Chronicles of slavery and violence] (in Italian). Marietti 1820. ISBN 9788821197826.
