= WFQY =

Currently silent
- Brandon, Mississippi; United States
- Broadcast area: Jackson, Mississippi
- Frequency: 970 kHz

Programming
- Format: Urban gospel

Ownership
- Owner: Rainey Radio; (Jackson Radio LLC)
- Sister stations: WJMF-LD; WZQK

History
- First air date: 1967 (as WRKN)
- Former call signs: WRKN (1966–2005); WZQK (2005–2008); WJFN (2008–2012)

Technical information
- Licensing authority: FCC
- Facility ID: 54820
- Class: D
- Power: 350 watts (day); 90 watts (night)
- Transmitter coordinates: 32°16′26″N 90°0′49″W
- Translator: 99.1 W256BL (Ridgeland)

Links
- Public license information: Public file; LMS

WFQY (970 AM) is an urban gospel radio station licensed to Brandon, Mississippi, and serving the Jackson area. It also operates translator station W256BL (99.1 FM) in Ridgeland. The station has been silent since 2026.

== History ==
The station was first licensed on August 10, 1967, as WRKN. It began as a country station. Longtime owners were Roy and June Harris. For a short time the station had a 1950s-based oldies format and also had a country gospel format for while. In later years it simulcast its sister station WRJH with a southern gospel format. After WRJH was sold, WRKN continued to operate with a southern gospel format.

After the retirement of the owner the station emerged as an affiliate of the Real Country network with classic country as WZQK (Real Country 970). On May 19, 2008, WZQK switched from classic country to all-sports, with the call sign WJFN.

By 2012, WJFN had returned to classic country as "Super Kountry 970". On April 5, 2012, WJFN changed its call sign to WFQY and began stunting; on April 20, WFQY changed its format to classic hip hop, branded as "BDay 99-1". The new branding reflected its 99-watt translator on 99.1 FM (W256BL) located in Jackson, but is licensed to Ridgeland, Mississippi.

After a brief period of silence, from July 2019 to June 2020, WFQY resumed broadcasting with a simulcast of WJMF-LP (87-7 The Bridge), one of many "Franken-FMs" the Federal Communications Commission (FCC) had ordered to cease broadcasting by July 2021. In June 2020, classic hip-hop returned to WFQY.

In August 2023, WFQY dropped classic hip-hop to simulcast WZQK. The classic hip-hop format (still branded "BDay 99-1") has since moved online. On April 19, 2024, WFQY ended its simulcast with WZQK and relaunched with urban gospel.

WFQY went silent on January 1, 2026, after losing its transmitter site lease ahead of construction and data center development. Translator station W256BL remained on the air, leading to a complaint with the FCC that the station had already been off the air for over a year and an April inspection that confirmed the continued operation of the translator. That June, Jackson Radio formally informed the FCC that WFQY was silent, and also shut down W256BL; the station provided records establishing that WFQY had remained in operation until January. In November, Jackson Radio reached a consent decree with the FCC allowing WFQY to remain silent under special temporary authority (STA) until January 1, 2027, while it sought a separate STA to build temporary facilities more than one mile (1.6 km) away at a former cable television reception pole.
