= WQLR (FM) =

Radio station in Chateaugay, New York, United States

WQLV
- Chateaugay, New York; United States
- Broadcast area: Cornwall, Ontario and Greater Montreal
- Frequency: 94.7 MHz
- Branding: K-Love

Programming
- Format: Contemporary Christian
- Affiliations: K-Love

Ownership
- Owner: Educational Media Foundation; (K-LOVE Inc.)
- Sister stations: WMWA

History
- First air date: April 15, 1997
- Former call signs: WXEB (1992, CP); WEEP (1992–1993, CP); WYUL (1993–2021, CP); WQLR (2021-2026)
- Call sign meaning: Quebec K-Love

Technical information
- Licensing authority: FCC
- Facility ID: 69847
- Class: C2
- ERP: 11,000 watts
- HAAT: 180 metres (590 ft)
- Transmitter coordinates: 44°46′56″N 74°13′09″W

Links
- Public license information: Public file; LMS
- Webcast: Listen Live
- Website: klove.com

WQLV (94.7 FM) is a non-commercial religious radio station licensed to Chateaugay, New York. It is owned by the Educational Media Foundation and it airs EMF's national K-Love Contemporary Christian format. The station is a border blaster, targeting Greater Montreal and the Seaway River Valley.

WQLV has an effective radiated power (ERP) of 11,000 watts. Its transmitter is on Old Hill Road in Ellenburg, New York, approximately 120 km (75 mi) southwest of Montreal. Its city-grade signal reaches the southwestern portion of Greater Montreal, while its Class C2 signal covers most of the largely English-speaking western neighborhoods of Montreal. In the eastern part of Montreal, where French predominates, the signal receives strong interference from co-channel CHEY-FM, Rouge FM's signal based in Trois-Rivières.

== History ==
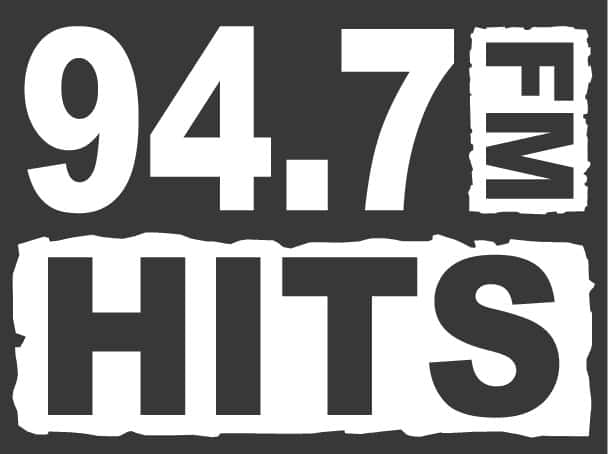
Previous logo under WYUL

The station was built by the Martz Communications Group, and signed on as in 1997 (the IATA code for Montréal–Trudeau International Airport). The station was originally a simulcast of CHR/Top 40-formatted WYSX in Ogdensburg until August 2002, when the station segued to its own "94.7 Hits FM" branding and format. Under Martz ownership, WYUL's sister stations were WVNV and WICY, both licensed to Malone.

Although licensed to Chateaugay, New York, the station actively targeted the nearby Canadian markets of Montreal, Quebec and Cornwall, Ontario as a border blaster, and solicited advertising sales in the region. As a U.S.-based station licensed by the Federal Communications Commission, WYUL was exempt from Canadian Radio-television and Telecommunications Commission (CRTC) regulations regarding Canadian content, and was allowed to carry programming in both English and French rather than exclusively in a single language. In practice, the station primarily broadcast its programming in English, but commercial breaks generally featured both English- and French-language advertising.

Because WYUL was not a Canadian station, BBM Canada did not measure WYUL's audience. Station president Timothy Thompson noted that WYUL was still able to attract major advertisers even without ratings numbers, explaining that they were "buying based on the environment of the radio station and the fact that it's reaching a demographic that’s hard to reach. That 18-to-34 demographic is a difficult demographic to reach in terms of the radio offerings."

On June 28, 2021, Martz announced that it would sell WYUL and co-owned WVNV to the Educational Media Foundation (EMF), which runs two national Christian radio music services, K-Love and Air1. This would give EMF its first entry into the Montreal radio market albeit on an American radio signal. The last song played on "94.7 Hits FM" was "In The End" by Linkin Park on September 30, 2021. The station went silent at midnight, followed by K-Love programming starting the next day. The station changed its call letters to WQLR on October 5, 2021 until February 1, 2026 changed its call sign to WQLV when the former holder of the call sign in Millersburg, PA switched over to WCDF. With this move, CJFM and French-language CKOI remain as the last two contemporary hit radio stations that are able to be received in Chateaugay, New York.
