= Gilbert Gnarley =

Radio character

Gilbert Gnarley was a character developed and voiced by Gary Burbank of Cincinnati, Ohio, radio station 700 WLW in the late 1980s through 1990s. His comedy sketches involve prank phone calls to various businesses, organizations, and corporate headquarters, during which it becomes evident that Gilbert is very confused about something.

Those who answer the calls may not initially realize that he is confused, but once they discover the source of his confusion, their reactions range from heartfelt compassion to annoyance to fits of laughter, all of which are used for comedic value. Traits of his calls include always spelling his last name for his listener — "Hello, my name is Gilbert Gnarley, G-N-A-R-L-E-Y..." — and never saying "goodbye" at the end of the call, instead saying "Okay? Okay?" repeatedly, inducing the individual to respond either with an affirming "okay" or to hang up.

By 1993, Burbank said that it had become difficult to find anyone in Cincinnati who would take Gilbert's calls seriously, forcing him to make prank calls to more distant locations.

== Character background ==
Gilbert is an elderly resident of the St. Pia Zadora Golden Buckeye Retirement Community in Pisgah, a community outside Cincinnati, where he lives with his dog, the Amazing Crepso. He was married to his wife, Iona Gnarley, for 35 years before, reportedly, she was killed by a falling crate of life rafts. [In one bit, Gilbert's wife's name was Euletta Gnarley.] Gilbert's roommate is named Myron Flats, and has a malicious sense of humor and a flatulence problem. On 21 December 2007, Gnarley was taken out of retirement and received a call from Myron Flatts, F-L-A-T-T-S from the Pisgah Decency League while working at Toys 'R' Us... Never to be heard from again. All bits are G-rated.

== Calls ==
- A telefacsimile machine supplier, to complain that a casino had refused to accept money sent by fax.
- Fireworks stores and toy stores before July 4 and Christmas, respectively, as a member of the Pisgah Decency League (PDL, pronounced "piddle") to make sure they do not carry any items on a list that PDL has determined to be "offensive". All items are imaginary, and carry ridiculous dangerous-sounding names such as Raggedy-Ann Lip-Lock Lesbos.
- Johnson & Johnson about K-Y Jelly (which he referred to as "Kentucky Jelly"), explaining that he enjoyed their tasty product on toast, although the flavor was slightly lacking. He also inquired about recipes.
- The White House as a salesman of vinyl siding, asking to speak to "the man of the house," offering great deals and specials on new colored siding.
- A city water company, to explain that while practicing a Sound of Music-type dance in anticipation of obtaining a job as a Wal-Mart greeter, he accidentally flung coins for his bus fare, and was calling to see if they had located the coins yet.
- A psychic, asking her to interpret the behavior of his dog, The Amazing Crepso. (Barking and kicking his food dish, scratching at the door, etc.)
- The "Living Spiritual Master Who Can Answer All Your Questions and Change Your Life," to ask the answer to a crossword puzzle. ("What is a four-letter word describing a lumpy object ending in -urd.") Gilbert frequently referred to him as "The Living Spiritual Master Who Can Answer All My Questions and Change My Life" and successfully irritated the accented "Spiritual Master" into hanging up.
- The CIA to inquire about becoming a spy, explaining that his skills were spying on fellow residents of the retirement home (using a drinking glass, which Gilbert explained, works best when empty) and knowing all the words to Johnny Rivers' song "Secret Agent Man."
- The Rush Limbaugh program to provide his condolences to Rush for not winning the St. Pia Zadora Golden Buckeye Retirement Community's annual spam contest, wherein a statue made of spam is created of a figure which most represents the ideals of spam. Rush Limbaugh was in second place, with the winner being Jerry Van Dyke.
- The M&M Company, to explain his concern that less than half of the M&M's coming out of the package were actual M's. (Some of them were letter W's, with a few being strange-looking E's.) In a similar but different call, he complained that someone was counterfeiting M&Ms because he noticed they only had one "M" on them, and figured authentic "M&Ms" should have two M's.
- Sinus-spray makers, in a slightly muffled voice, explaining that he had accidentally confused his sinus spray with super glue, and now his nose was glued shut.
- Salad dressing makers, to inquire what the SPF sunscreen factor was for their products.
- A funeral home, to arrange for the body of his wife Iona to be displayed inside a food buffet, claiming that he had invented the salad bar, but failed to get a patent in time.
- A phone sex hotline, to explain that he had a weakness for...food. Each time the female on the line tried to turn the conversation to more erotic topics, Gilbert continually reverted to talking about food.
- The White House to offer the Reagan family assistance during their move out of the residence at the end of the President's term...as well as advice to the Secret Service on how to distinguish a piece of "Chiclet" gum from a ruby ring worn by Mrs. Reagan...(the gum turns white when licked)
- Sears and Roebuck regarding the price and availability of a "carpet mower", since he assumed they offered such a tool since his shag carpeting had begun to grow
- Complain to Mattel, the maker of Barbie, after hearing his granddaughter's doll state that "Math is hard". "Math isn't hard"..."you know what's hard? Fighting the Japanese in 100 degree heat in WWII! That's hard! Not math!"
- Repeatedly returning several calls to Milwaukee Zoo, (on April Fool's Day) after receiving "messages" from a Ms. Ellie Font, a Mr. P. Cocke, etc...and finally a Mr. Madagascarian Fruit Bat...
- A psychic explaining that he has misplaced a winning lottery ticket
- The John Birch Society offering his appreciation and asking if he may join. He asks if they offer advice on growing [birch] trees
- A call to the Niagara Starch company when accidentally confusing their product as Viagra Starch, complimenting them on the use of the word 'fabric' to describe the male member.
- A call to the Butterball Turkey hotline to complain that the turkey had a colostomy evidenced by the bag in its internal cavity.
- A call to the Nashville Tourism Bureau to plan a trip for the senior citizens. Asking to see several sites he was assured it was all possible, then he asked to see Porter Waggoner's grave. Silence on the line ... 'sir, Porter Waggoner is not dead' ... Gilbert expressed that so many seniors would be disappointed and asked when a trip might be scheduled to see the gravesite.
- A call to a local elementary school principal to ask for forgiveness for leaving school early after being sent to the principal's office on 7 December 1941 after learning of the Japanese attack on Pearl Harbor.
- A call to local ER with wax paper over comb rattling as he spoke, asking if he should get the kazoo he swallowed at a particularly exciting "Red's Kazoo Night" at Riverfront Stadium the previous night removed.
- A call to the Pentagon to inform them he had invented a way to allow any fighter jet to take off vertically from an aircraft carrier. He only needed to figure out how to get the carrier up to 140 miles per hour.
- A call to the makers of Tucks Medicated Pads to purchase a tuxedo for an upcoming wedding. After seeming to understand his confusion, he finally asked if they had any cummerbunds.

== See also ==
- Earl Pitts (character)
