= WPDM =

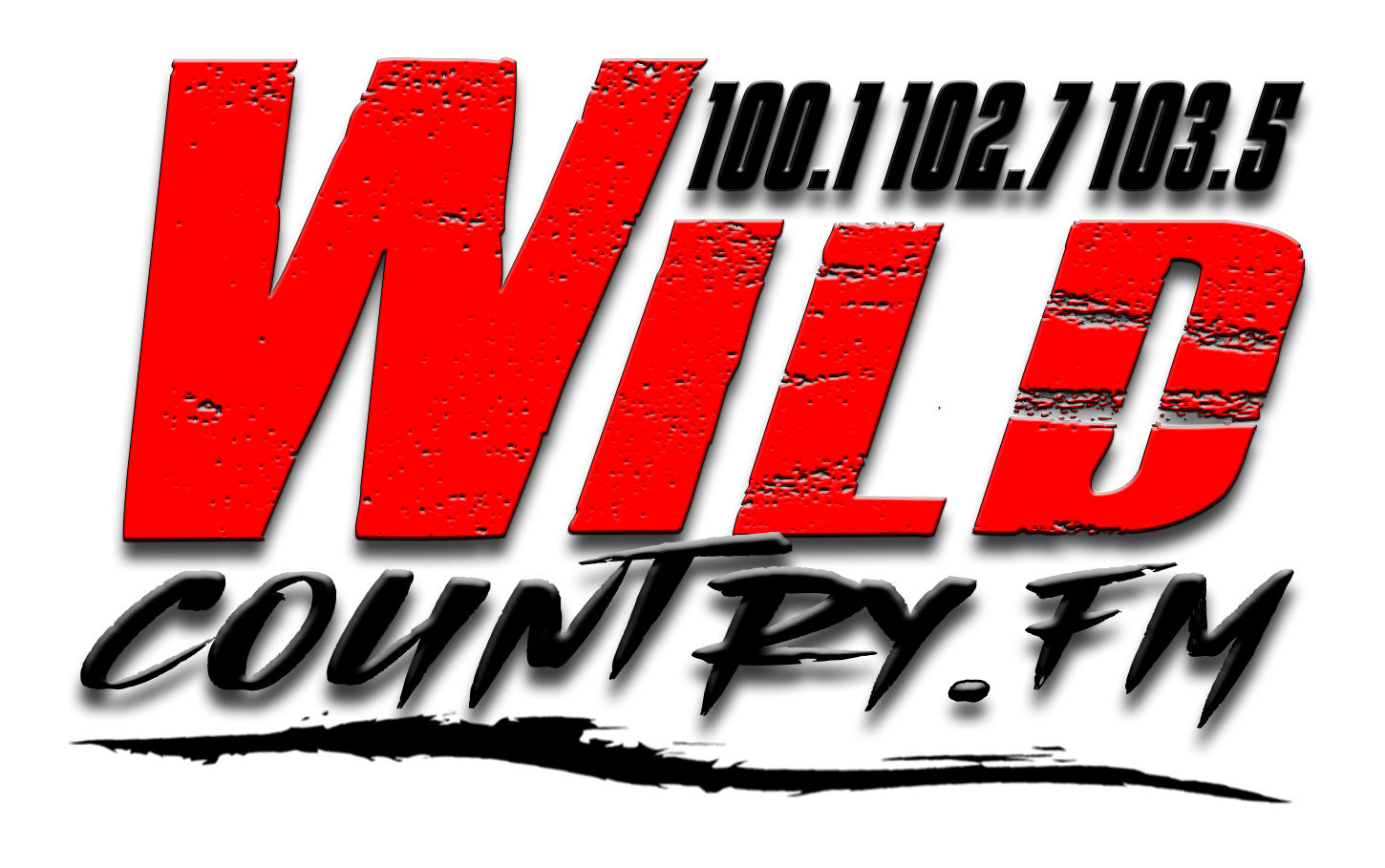
- Potsdam, New York; United States
- Broadcast area: Canton, New York
- Frequency: 1470 kHz
- Branding: Wild Country

Programming
- Format: Country music
- Affiliations: Compass Media Networks; Performance Racing Network; Premiere Networks

Ownership
- Owner: Timothy D. Martz; (Martz Communications Group Inc.)
- Sister stations: WICY, WSNN

History
- First air date: 1955
- Call sign meaning: W PotsDaM

Technical information
- Licensing authority: FCC
- Facility ID: 62134
- Class: D
- Power: 1,000 watts day 44 watts night
- Transmitter coordinates: 44°38′38″N 75°3′32″W
- Translator: 100.1 W261CJ (Potsdam)

Links
- Public license information: Public file; LMS
- Webcast: Listen live
- Website: wildcountry.fm

WPDM (1470 AM) is a radio station broadcasting a country music format. Licensed to Potsdam, New York, United States, the station is owned by Timothy D. Martz, through licensee Martz Communications Group Inc.

== History ==
On May 18, 2015, WPDM changed formats from sports to classic country, branded as "Star 100.1".

On September 20, 2021, WPDM changed formats from classic country to country, branded as "Wild Country".

== FM translator ==
Broadcast translator for WPDM
Call sign	Frequency	City of license	FID	ERP (W)	HAAT	Class	FCC info
W261CJ	100.1 FM	Potsdam, New York	24613	99	0 m (0 ft)	D	LMS

== Previous logo ==
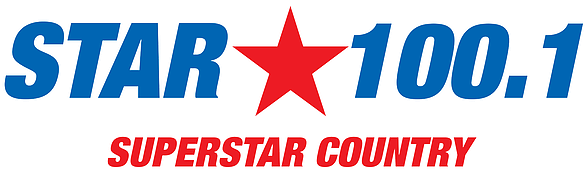
