= WNCQ-FM =

Radio stations in Canton, New York

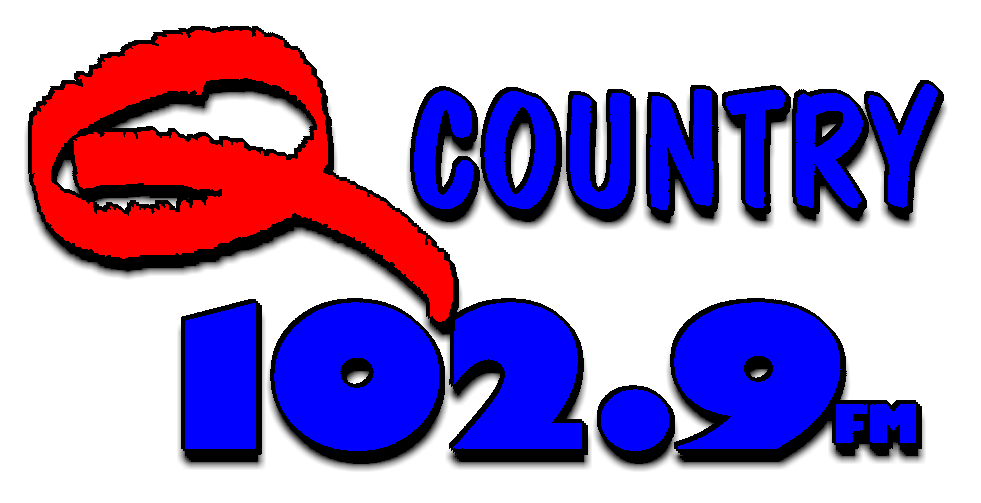
- Canton, New York; United States
- Broadcast area: Ogdensburg, New York
- Frequency: 102.9 MHz
- Branding: Q Country 102.9

Programming
- Format: Country

Ownership
- Owner: Stephens Media Group; (Stephens Media Group Ogdensburg, LLC)
- Sister stations: WPAC, WYSX

History
- Former call signs: WSLU (1965–1986); WJGT (April–September 1986); WVNC (1986–1999); WVLF (1999–2001); WYSI (2001–2003); WPAC (2003–2004)

Technical information
- Licensing authority: FCC
- Facility ID: 3410
- Class: C3
- ERP: 23,500 watts
- HAAT: 103 meters (338 ft)
- Transmitter coordinates: 44°32′10″N 75°5′46″W

Links
- Public license information: Public file; LMS
- Webcast: Listen Live
- Website: q1029.com

WNCQ-FM (102.9 FM) is a radio station licensed to Canton, New York, United States. It airs a country music format. The station is owned by the Stephens Media Group.

The station had been owned by Martz Communications Group, and was acquired by Stephens on February 1, 2008.
