= WZQK =

- Flowood, Mississippi; United States
- Broadcast area: Jackson, Mississippi
- Frequency: 1240 kHz
- Branding: 94.3 The Bridge

Programming
- Format: Classic hits (since July 13, 2021)

Ownership
- Owner: Rainey Radio; (Radio Jackson, LLC)
- Sister stations: WFQY; WJMF-LD

History
- First air date: 1996 (as WPBQ)
- Former call signs: WZQA (1991–1992, CP); WPBQ (1992–2020)

Technical information
- Licensing authority: FCC
- Facility ID: 52026
- Class: C
- Power: 880 watts
- Transmitter coordinates: 32°18′3.5″N 90°8′12.3″W
- Translator: 94.3 W232DD (Jackson)

Links
- Public license information: Public file; LMS
- Webcast: Listen live
- Website: 943fmthebridge.live

WZQK is a radio station licensed to Flowood, Mississippi.

== History ==
From November 9, 1992 until September 30, 2020, the station's call sign was WPBQ. Its previous format was urban variety, a blend of contemporary hip-hop, urban gospel, and even some regional Mexican.

The station went on the air in 1996 as WPBQ. It was sold by its original owners, PBD Corporation, to TalkQ Corporation in 2003 for $42,500. TalkQ owned the station until selling to the present licensees in 2016.

On October 9, 2020 WZQK debuted with classic country.

On July 12, 2021 WZQK began simulcasting WJMF-LP, in preparation for WJMF-LP's inevitable demise.

Since July 14, 2021 WZQK's format has been classic hits.

On May 15, 2025, WZQK was revamped. The station had new promos, and even added more '80s music.
