= WMWA =

Air1 radio station in Malone, New York

- Malone, New York; United States
- Broadcast area: Cornwall, Ontario; Franklin County, New York
- Frequency: 96.5 MHz

Programming
- Format: Christian worship
- Network: Air1

Ownership
- Owner: Educational Media Foundation; (K-LOVE Inc.)
- Sister stations: WQLV

History
- First air date: May 1, 1993
- Former call signs: WVNV (1993–2021)

Technical information
- Licensing authority: FCC
- Facility ID: 36121
- Class: C3
- ERP: 23,500 watts
- HAAT: 122 meters (400 ft)
- Transmitter coordinates: 44°46′56″N 74°13′9″W

Links
- Public license information: Public file; LMS
- Webcast: Listen Live
- Website: air1.com

WMWA (96.5 FM) is an American radio station broadcasting a Christian worship music radio format. Licensed to Malone, New York, United States, the station is currently owned by the Educational Media Foundation.

== History ==
On June 28, 2021, Martz Communications Group announced that it was selling 94.7 WYUL Chateaugay and WVNV (which was broadcasting a country music format under the branding Wild Country 96-5) to the Educational Media Foundation (EMF), which runs K-Love and Air1, two Christian radio music formats. That would give EMF its first entry into the Greater Montreal, Canada's second-largest radio market, albeit on an American radio signal. The two stations also are heard in a section of Eastern Ontario, including the city of Cornwall. The sale, at a price of $2.5 million, was consummated on September 30, 2021. The station changed its call letters to WMWA on October 5, 2021.
