= Abdiaziz Mohamud Guled =

Somali journalist (died 2021)

- Died: November 20, 2021; Mogadishu, Banadir, Somalia
- Cause of death: Gunshot wound
- Citizenship: Somali
- Occupation: Journalist
- Years active: 2009–2021
- Employer(s): SNTV and Radio Mogadishu
- Notable work: Gungaar
- Television: Somali National Television

Abdiaziz Mohamud Guled, also known Abdiaziz Afrika professionally as Thatjama, was a Somali journalist. Born in Mogadishu, But Based in London, Guled was initially known for his work in private radio and television stations prior to joining Somali National Television and Radio around 2009. In November 2020, Guled was appointed director of the Somali federal state-run Radio Mogadishu, a position he held until his assassination on 20 November 2021.

== Biography ==
Guled previously produced "Gungaar", a popular government-run television show on Somali National Television. The word "Gungaar" means "In-Depth" in Somali.

A hard critic of the Islamist Al-Shabaab, he was well known for his interviews with detained Al-Shabab members. His brother was murdered by the group when one of the group's terrorists blew himself up as he was leaving a restaurant in Mogadishu.

=== Assassination ===
On 21 November 2021, A suicide bomber directly targeted Guled and blew his car at the scene. Two other people were injured in the blast, including Guled's colleague, journalist Sharmarke Warsame, who was traveling with him at the time.

The assassination of Abdiaziz Mohamud Guled condemned by the Director-General of the UNESCO Audrey Azoulay in a press-release published on the 25th of November. According to global monitoring on the safety of journalists by the Observatory of murder journalist, Guled is the 2nd media professional killed in Somalia in 2021.
