= Michel Alberganti =

French radio producer and writer (1955–2021)

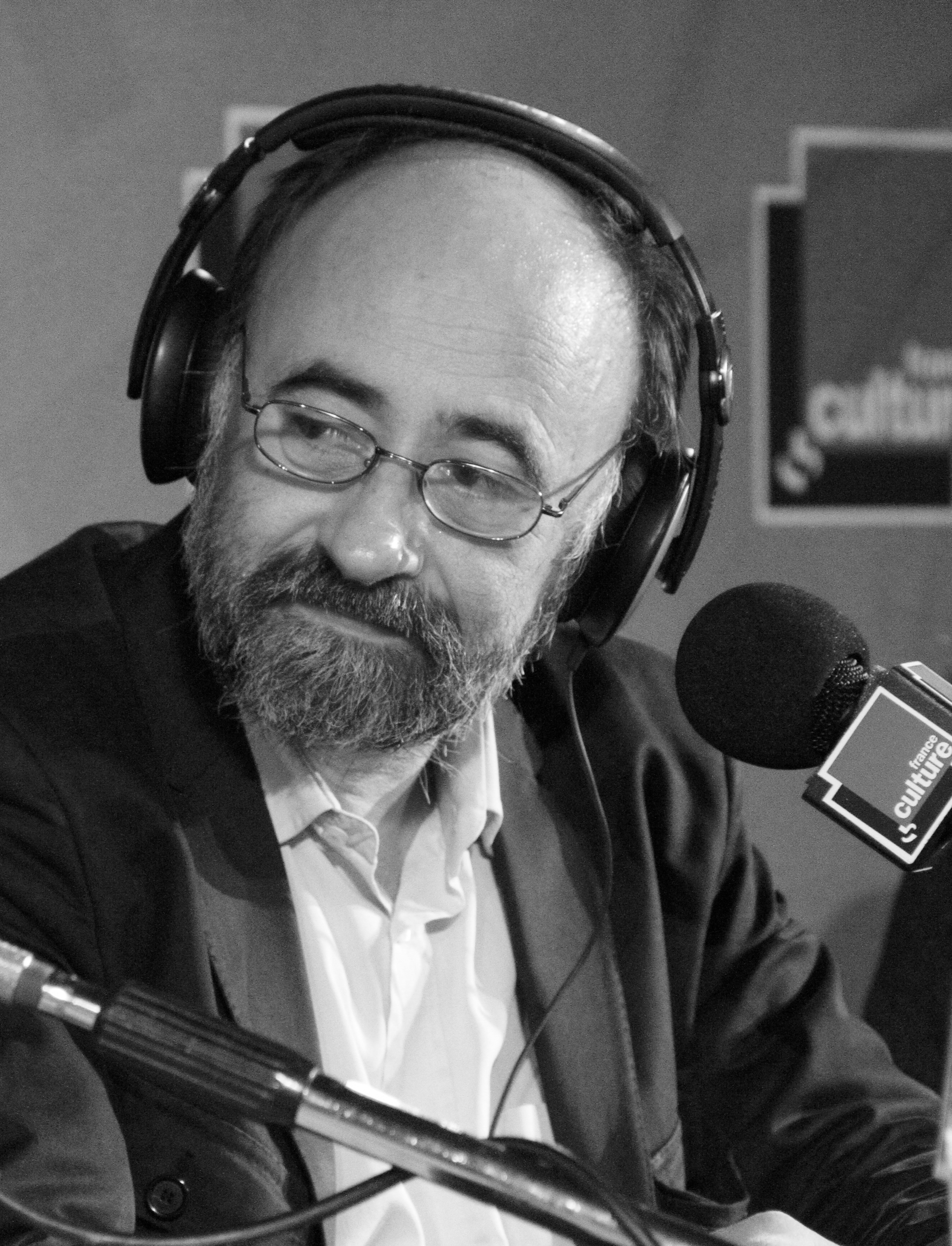
- Alberganti in 2013
- Born: 25 May 1955
- Died: 15 March 2021 (aged 65)
- Occupations: Radio Producer; Writer

Michel Alberganti (25 May 1955 – 15 March 2021) was a French radio producer, writer, and journalist.

== Biography ==
Alberganti graduated from the Arts et Métiers ParisTech in 1974. An engineer in his early career, he travelled to Sudan, where he worked on local solar energy production. He then joined the Bureau Veritas, where he held responsibility for the certification of gas transport vessels. He began his journalistic career in 1983 with the technology magazine Industrie et Technologies before joining Les Echos and L'Usine nouvelle.

Alberganti became a scientific journalist for Le Monde in 1995, for which he wrote a number of articles and dossiers. From 2003 to 2006, he worked for the France Culture radio show Science frictions. In May 2010, he created a blog titled En quête de science on France Culture.

Michel Alberganti died of cancer on 18 March 2021 at the age of 65.

== Publications ==
- Le multimédia, la révolution au bout des doigts (1997)
- À l'école des robots ? : l'informatique, l'école et vos enfants (2000)
- Sous l'œil des puces : la RFID et la démocratie (2007)
- La RFID : quelles menaces, quelles opportunités ? (2008)
