= Martz Communications Group =

American radio broadcasting company

Martz Communications Group is an American radio broadcasting company, which operates three radio stations in the St. Lawrence River area of New York and one in Pittsburgh, Pennsylvania. The company, which also operates under the names Radio Power and Cartier Communications, is co-based in Parishville, New York and San Francisco, California; with auxiliary offices in Reno, Nevada; Burlington, Vermont; and Pointe-Claire, Quebec.

The company was founded in 1986 by Tim Martz, a native of Kitchener, Ontario who purchased radio stations WDHP and WFST in Presque Isle, Maine, taking advantage of the market across the border in New Brunswick, Canada without being required to submit to the rules of the CRTC. Its scope eventually expanded to target larger Canadian markets, such as Brockville, Cornwall, Ottawa and Montreal, which lay within the broadcast range of its stations. The Canadian company Slaight Communications is also a minority shareholder in Martz. Slaight's ownership stake in Martz was not part of that company's sale of most of its broadcasting assets to Astral Media in 2007.

== Stations ==
- Malone, New York: WICY
- Potsdam, New York: WPDM, WSNN
- Pittsburgh, Pennsylvania: WAMO

Martz Communications also handles advertising sales for Burlington, Vermont stations WEZF (owned by Vox Communications) and WBTZ (owned by Hall Communications).

=== Former stations ===
==== Stephens Media Group ====
The following stations were previously owned by Martz, and sold February 1, 2008 to the Stephens Media Group:

- Canton, New York: WRCD, WNCQ-FM
- Massena, New York: WMSA
- Morristown, New York: WYSX
- Norwood, New York: WVLF
- Ogdensburg, New York: WPAC-FM

==== Educational Media Foundation ====
The following stations were previously owned by Martz, and sold September 30, 2021 to the Educational Media Foundation:

- Chateaugay, New York: WYUL
- Malone, New York: WVNV

Martz also previously programmed the HD2 and HD3 feeds of WGPR in Detroit, Michigan, which were repeated on local FM translators owned by Martz: W284BQ and W232CA. However, on January 31, 2012 Martz ceased operations of the HD feeds and the translators, due to financial and signal difficulties.

==== Other Former Stations ====
- Lexington/Port Huron, Michigan: WBTI
- Sault Ste. Marie, Michigan: WYSS
