= Happy FM (Ghana) =

Radio station in Accra, Ghana

Accra; Ghana
- Broadcast area: Greater Accra Region
- Frequency: 98.9 MHz,

Programming
- Language: English
- Format: Local sports news, entertainment, international sports news.

Ownership
- Owner: Global Media Alliance
- Sister stations: e.TV

History
- First air date: September 2003

Links
- Website: HappyGhana.com

Happy FM (Ghana) is a privately owned radio station in Accra, the capital of Ghana, broadcasting on 98.9 MHz from Accra, Ghana. It began official transmission in September 2003 and is owned and run by the Global Media Alliance. "The Best Ever Sports Station in Ghana Broadcasting Sports News."

== Programs and events ==
Happy FM is known for its sports content for all audience at local and international stage. The station broadcasts in English language to its audience via 98.9 MHz and online. Happy FM is one of the radio stations in affiliation with BBC in Ghana.

== Notable presenters ==
- Samuel Eshun
- Dr Cann
- Samuel Amankwah
- DJ Adviser
