= WSNN =

- Potsdam, New York; United States
- Broadcast area: Canton, New York
- Frequency: 99.3 MHz
- Branding: B99.3

Programming
- Language: English
- Format: 1980's hits
- Affiliations: Compass Media Networks; Premiere Networks; United Stations Radio Networks

Ownership
- Owner: Timothy D. Martz; (Martz Communications Group Inc.)
- Sister stations: WPDM

History
- First air date: 1968
- Former call signs: WPDM-FM (1968–1976)

Technical information
- Licensing authority: FCC
- Facility ID: 62135
- Class: A
- ERP: 3,000 watts
- HAAT: 47 meters (154 ft)
- Transmitter coordinates: 44°38′38″N 75°3′32″W

Links
- Public license information: Public file; LMS
- Webcast: Listen live
- Website: b993.fm

WSNN (99.3 FM) is a radio station broadcasting a 1980s hits format. It is licensed to Potsdam, New York, United States. The station is owned by Timothy D. Martz, through licensee Martz Communications Group Inc.

== History ==
The station originally signed on in early December 1968 as WPDM-FM, with a simulcast during the daytime hours of sister station WPDM (AM) 1470. During the evenings, the station would break away from the simulcast with its own Top 40 format and broadcast local sporting events. On May 24, 1976, the FM side dropped the simulcast and began broadcasting in stereo with its own independent easy-listening format. To go along with the new improved sound, the station started calling itself "Stereo 99", and changed call letters to WSNN to match. The station has kept those calls since. By the late 1980s, the station flipped to Top 40 as "99 Hits," then a brief period with country music, back to Top 40 (and the "99 Hits" name) under the previous owner St. Lawrence Radio Inc. The current format and "B99.3" name have been in place since 2012.
