= DJ Adviser =

Ghanaian Radio Presenter (died 2021)

- Also known as: DJ Adviser
- Born: Isaac De-Graft Danquah; Ghana
- Origin: Ghana
- Died: 4 March 2021
- Genres: Highlife, hip hop, afro-pop, R&B, afrobeat
- Occupation(s): DJ, Radio Presenter
- Instrument: Turntables

Isaac De-Graft Danquah (died 4 March 2021), known professionally as DJ Adviser, was a Ghanaian radio presenter and DJ at Happy FM. He won the Record Promoter of the Year four times in a row at the Ghana DJ Awards event.

== Career ==
He was the radio host of 'Ayekoo' after Drive show and DJ at Happy FM in Accra. He interviewed Fantana, a female artiste on his show and she got emotional when questioned about her father.

== Death ==
He was reported to have died after a short illness on 4 March 2021.

== Legacy ==
It was claimed he decided to put spotlight on artistes who were yet to be known in Ghana. His program provided songs to listeners that were selected and became hits even though those who love music did not patronize the songs. He was known for promoting Ghanaian talents on his program.
