= Earl Pitts (character) =

Radio character created and voiced by Gary Burbank

Earl Pitts is a fictional character performed by Gary Burbank, a radio personality from Cincinnati, Ohio beginning in 1968.

Pitts, who is almost always referred to as "Earl Pitts, Uhmerikun" (as in "American") is a stereotype of a redneck from the Southern United States. As such, Pitts presents a daily "editorial," which always begins with a bugle call of "Assembly", and the words, "Ya' know what makes me sick?" followed by another line like, "You know what makes me s'angry, ah just want to soak mah butt in a bucket of toxic waste?" Pitts then goes off on a rant, either about some cultural topic of the day as seen from a redneck point of view, or an anecdote about his home life or his job at the local tavern. His family and friends—wife Pearl, son Earl Junior, daughter Sandra Dee, and good friend Dub Meeker, among others—figure prominently in many routines. His signature ending lines are "Wake Up, Uhmerika!" and "Ah'm Earl Pitts, Uhmerikun. Pitts off!" while "The Washington Post" march plays in the background.

Burbank, whose radio career had taken him from his native Memphis to his 20-year-plus gig working afternoon drive time at 700/WLW in Cincinnati (and briefly in national syndication), began the Pitts character shortly after arriving at WLW. The daily routines became an instant hit, and a few years later Pitts' commentaries were syndicated nationally. Earl Pitts now is heard on about 200 stations and via XM Satellite Radio's WLW simulcast. The monologues were written by a team that included Rob Ervin, Jim Probasco, Tim Mizak, Kel Crum, J.D. Riggs and Todd Richmond, with Burbank refining the scripts before broadcast.

Burbank said that Pitts is the second-longest running syndicated comedy program ever behind Paul Harvey News and Comment. Harvey's program was neither a comedy program nor syndicated; it was a network program heard on ABC Radio Networks for its entire 58-year run, and at least two national comedy shows date to before the introduction of Pitts', both launching nationwide in 1974: Dr. Demento, which syndicated until 2010, and A Prairie Home Companion, a comedy-centric variety series that ran until 2016. As both of those shows are weekly series, the Pitts monologues, airing five episodes a week, have more episodes.

Earl's Web site featured items for sale including purchase rights to previous monologues. Ostensibly, hearing the program online required a subscription to the Pitts Web site. However, many stations stream the program at a regular time, and in addition, WFLA in Tampa, Florida offered a daily podcast of the show.

Despite Burbank's retirement as a host of WLW, the daily Pitts commentaries continued for several years afterward, and later expanded into television. Burbank taped several 90-second "commentaries" as Pitts to be seen on WGN America and possibly other stations owned by Tribune Company. The spots were done at the behest of Burbank's old boss at WLW, and were taped at a pub in Fort Thomas, Kentucky.

Burbank announced in December 2020 that he would no longer record any new commentaries, citing among the factors his age, chronic obstructive pulmonary disease, and a desire to shift toward a podcast featuring his other character bits. The last original recording was broadcast on January 1, 2021. Burbank died in late August 2025.

== Character background ==
Very little has been written seriously about Pitts's home and family life; most written references contain little but nonsense. However, Pitts does frequently mention such information in his monologues. He is of indeterminate middle age and is unhappily married to his wife of twenty-five years, Pearl, with whom he has two children: his son, Earl Jr., whose age varies between teen years and early 20s and who frequently comes to his father for advice, and his teenage daughter Sandra Dee (named after, but no relation to the actress of the same name), who is noted for her presumed ugliness and is more of a nuisance. He has a little-mentioned brother, Merle Pitts. Earl has a day job as an automotive worker and a night job as a bartender at the Duck Inn, a local tavern. His experiences and interactions with the bar patrons serve as fodder for many of his monologues. He claims to be a cousin of actor Brad Pitt.

Earl's hometown is not explicitly stated in most cases; Pitts himself states that he hails from Water Valley, Mississippi but tries to sound like he comes from a generic small town near the listener—for instance, KERN in Bakersfield, California, a Pitts affiliate, claimed Pitts to be from nearby Oildale, and KSCS in Arlington, Texas claimed for many years he was the former mayor of Gun Barrel City, Texas. Earl's website states he spent many, if not all, of his early years in Rooster Ear, Mississippi, a fictitious town of his own creation.

The "Uhmerikun" part of Pitts' outro originated at the turn of the 20th century; prior to that, the outro was slightly longer, with Pitts saying "Earl Pitts, Native Uhmerikun Redneck. Pitts off!" The outro was changed as a gesture toward not offending any listeners.

== See also ==
- Gilbert Gnarley
- Ed Anger
