= RAI Libri =

Italian publishing house owned by RAI

Rai Libri
- Founded: 1949; 76 years ago
- Headquarters: Rome, Italy
- Owner: RAI

Rai Libri is a publishing house owned by Italian public broadcaster RAI through Rai Com.

== History ==
=== Edizioni Radio Italiana ===
The first publishing activity of former RAI, the URI (Unione radiofonica italiana), was the issuing of the weekly journal Radio Orario in January 1925, with the schedules of the radio programmes of the broadcaster including the ones of other European stations. Radio Orario became Radiocorriere in 1930 and Radiocorriere TV in 1954.

On 15 September 1949, the Edizioni Radio Italiana (ERI) was founded in Turin by RAI. in order to unite and valorize the publishing activity of the public broadcaster. On 31 July 1954 capital was distributed between RAI (30%) and IRI (30%).

During fifties and sixties, ERI published the series Classe Unica (in pocket format) and journals L'Approdo letterario and L'Approdo Musicale, based on the homonymous cultural radio programs.

In 1969, ERI issued the first edition of the Dizionario d'ortografia e di pronunzia, a dictionary of orthography and orthoepy of the Italian language.

=== Eighties and Nuova ERI ===
.During the eighties, ERI had issued the monthly journals of Moda (since 1983, for women) and King (since 1987, for men), both directed by journalist Vittorio Corona (then Willy Molco) and produced in Milan. King and Moda represented an innovative development of magazines, with their verbal language and layout, and the contents deliberately oxymoronic.

On 23 July 1987, the company was renamed in "Nuova Eri Edizioni Rai-Radiotelevisione Italiana S.p.A."

=== Nineties and Rai Eri ===
Since the nineties, Nuova Eri had developed its activity in close relation with the radio and TV production. The company had published books and journalistic reports written by the most notorious figures of RAI programmes (including Enzo Biagi, Bruno Vespa, Sergio Zavoli, Piero Angela and Antonio Caprarica) together with other publishing houses like Mondadori and Rizzoli. After a crisis occurred during the direction of Alberto Luna at the end of the eighties, Nuova Eri was relaunched by director Giuseppe Marchetti Tricamo who reformed and restyled the company, making it as a protagonist of the publishing market.

Nuova ERI was closed in 1995 and RAI began to publish directly its books and journals on 1 January 1996, with the "Rai Eri" trademark in 1997.

=== Rai Libri ===
In 2014, Rai Eri was included in Rai Com and then re-established as Rai Libri in January 2019.

== Publications ==
Rai Libri publishes Elettronica e telecomunicazioni, Nuova rivista musicale italiana, Nuova civiltà delle macchine and DOP - Dizionario di ortografia e pronunzia.

One of the main task of Rai Libri is to contribute to the study of communication and media and to document the activity of the public broadcasting service, valorizing its activity.

== Notable authors ==
- Piero and Alberto Angela
- Bruno Vespa
- Enzo Biagi
- Giovanni Allevi
- Roberto Giacobbo
- Gigi Marzullo
- Antonio Caprarica

== Logos ==
Logo of Rai Eri in 2018.

Logo of Rai Libri since 15 October 2018.

== See also ==
- RAI
- BBC Books
