= David Rehling =

Danish lawyer and journalist (1949–2021)

Vice-President of the European Secretariat of the Committee on the Environment
- In office 1987–1996

Personal details
- Born: 13 May 1949 Dragør, Denmark
- Died: 2 June 2021 (aged 72)
- Party: Danish Social Liberal Party

David Rehling (13 May 1949 – 2 June 2021) was a Danish lawyer, journalist, and politician.

== Biography ==
Rehling earned a law degree from the University of Copenhagen in 1975 and became a clerk for the Ministry of the Environment. He then taught administrative law from the University of Copenhagen. In 1984, he became director of the Danish Society for Nature Conservation and increased the society's popularity until his term ended in 1996. From 1987 to 1996, he was vice-president of the European Secretariat of the Committee on the Environment. He then became an editor and later a writer at Dagbladet Information.

In 1973, Rehling unsuccessfully ran for a seat in the Folketing as a member of the Danish Social Liberal Party.

David Rehling died on 2 June 2021 at the age of 72.
