= Amobé Mévégué =

Cameroonian journalist and radio host (1968–2021)

- Born: 1 October 1968; Yaoundé, Cameroon
- Died: 8 September 2021 (aged 52); Paris, France
- Occupations: Journalist; Radio host

Amobé Mévégué (1 October 1968 – 8 September 2021) was a Cameroonian journalist, radio host, and producer.

== Biography ==
Born in Yaoundé in 1968, Mévégué arrived in France at the age of five. He earned his Diplôme d'études universitaires générales in communications and also studied cinematography. He later studied at the Conservatoire libre du cinéma français and began directing short films.

In the mid-1980s, Mévégué took part in the foundation of Tabala FM, the first African radio station established in France. In 1994, he became director of Plein Sud, a program broadcast to over 45 million listeners on Radio France Internationale. He later produced Africa Musica, which was broadcast on television across Africa thanks to Canal France International. In 1998, he co-produced the first African talk show on diversity on MCM Africa alongside Myriam Seurat. That same year, he produced the documentary Abidjan on dit quoi on Canal+ alongside Ivorian journalist Joseph Andjou.

In 2000, Mévégué co-founded the magazine Afrobiz, as well as the corresponding website Afrobiz.com, which had a circulation of 50,000 copies. From 2002 to 2005, he produced the radio show Acoustic on TV5Monde, which featured some prominent names in international music. In 2010, he began running the music and culture section of France 24. In 2014, he became director of the monthly magazine Africanités alongside Lise-Laure Etia and Christian Eboulé.

During the COVID-19 pandemic, Mévégué held the online event "WAN Show 2.0", which featured over 200 personalities. It was held in 2020 and 2021 on Africa Day. While serving as media director of Afrobiz, he founded the television channel Ubiznews. It was available in Africa on Les Bouquets Canal+ and in France on cable.

Amobé Mévégué died of malaria in Paris on 8 September 2021, at the age of 52.

== Filmography ==
=== Director ===
- Nola Darling (1992)
- Tenue correcte exigée (1994)

=== Producer ===
- Abidjan on dit quoi (1998)

=== Actor ===
- Ceux de 14 (2014)
