= WICY =

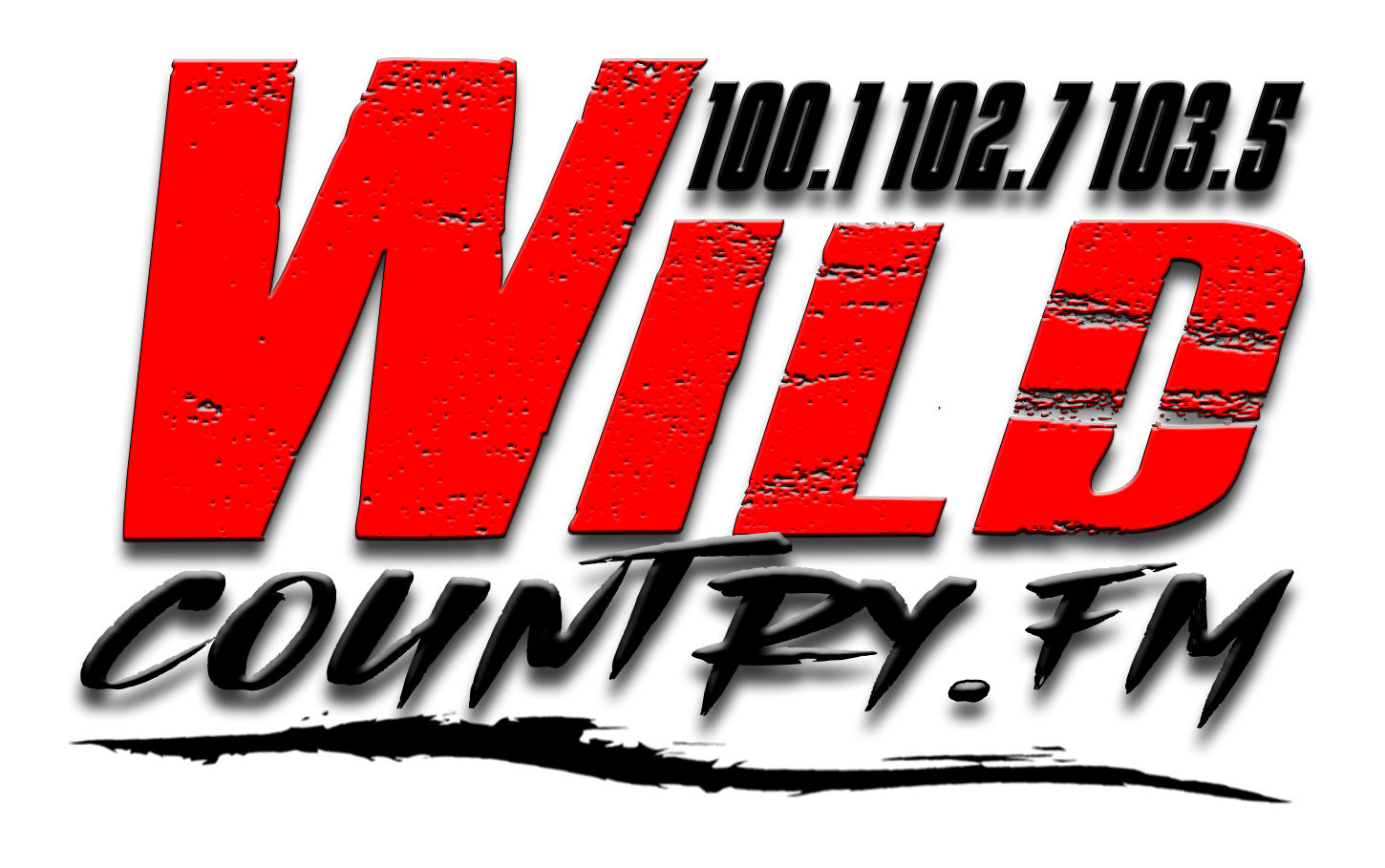
- Malone, New York; United States
- Broadcast area: Cornwall, Ontario; Franklin County, New York
- Frequency: 1490 kHz
- Branding: Wild Country

Programming
- Format: Country music
- Affiliations: Compass Media Networks; Performance Racing Network; Premiere Networks

Ownership
- Owner: Timothy Martz; (Martz Communications Group Inc.)
- Sister stations: WPDM, WSNN

History
- First air date: November 4, 1946; 79 years ago

Technical information
- Licensing authority: FCC
- Facility ID: 36122
- Class: C
- Power: 1,000 watts unlimited
- Transmitter coordinates: 44°50′46″N 74°16′7″W
- Translators: 102.7 W274BI (Malone); 103.5 W278CS (Akwesasne)

Links
- Public license information: Public file; LMS
- Webcast: Listen live
- Website: wildcountry.fm

WICY (1490 AM) is an American radio station broadcasting a country music format. Licensed to Malone, New York, United States, the station is owned by the Martz Communications Group. WICY is known on-air as Wild Country 102.7 and 103.5 (after its FM translator frequencies).

WICY and its 102.7 translator exclusively operates as a local station for Malone and nearby communities. Its 103.5 translator, despite being located in the US, predominantly covers the city of Cornwall, Ontario and its suburbs. Until 2021, it operated as a classic hits station for the Malone area.

WICY had a U.S. Federal Communications Commission construction permit to move to 1500 AM, with a city of license of Mooers, New York, with a proposed facility that would direct a 50,000-watt daytime signal towards Montreal; however, plans would be soon discarded, following complaints that the station's focus on Montreal would have meant substantially reduced coverage for information related to Malone or Franklin County.

On September 20, 2021, WICY changed their format from 1980s hits to country, branded as "Wild Country".

== Translators ==
In addition to the main station, WICY is relayed by two FM translators.

Call sign	Frequency	City of license	FID	ERP (W)	Class	FCC info
W274BI	102.7 FM	Malone, New York	152891	250	D	LMS
W278CS	103.5 FM	Akwesasne	200887	140	D	LMS

== Previous logo ==
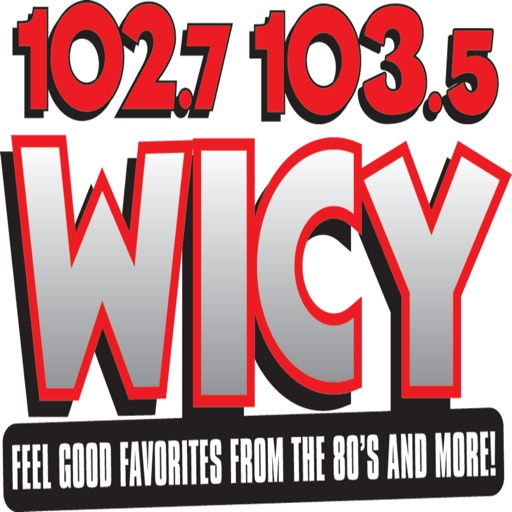
