= KOGT =

Former radio station in Orange, Texas

Orange, Texas; United States
- Broadcast area: Southeast Texas; Southwest Louisiana
- Frequency: 1600 kHz

Programming
- Format: Country

Ownership
- Owner: G-Cap Communications, Inc.

History
- First air date: January 16, 1948
- Last air date: December 31, 2021; (73 years, 349 days)
- Call sign meaning: Orange, Texas

Technical information
- Licensing authority: FCC
- Facility ID: 22950
- Class: B
- Power: 1,000 watts day; 1,000 watts night
- Transmitter coordinates: 30°8′25.8″N 93°45′11.6″W

Links
- Public license information: Public file; LMS
- Website: www.kogt.com

KOGT (1600 AM) was a radio station broadcasting a full service country music format. It was licensed to Orange, Texas, United States, and was last owned by G-Cap Communications.

KOGT's programming included country western music, sports, local news and weather, and was known for having live announcers; the station was not automated.

== History ==
KOGT signed on January 16, 1948, under the ownership of the Sabine Area Broadcasting Corporation. The station began its country music format in 1966, though, during the early 1970s, it programmed rock at night.

Sabine Area Broadcasting sold KOGT to the owners of KVUE in Austin, which included Allan Shivers, for $488,000 in 1976, a transaction approved by the Federal Communications Commission (FCC) the following year; all but Shivers also owned KNET in Palestine. This group sold KOGT to Klement Broadcasting for $900,000 in 1982; the new owner, Richard Klement, was a real estate investor in Gainesville, Texas, and owner of that city's KGAF AM-FM.

Klement sold KOGT to G-Cap Communications, controlled by Gary P. Stelly, for $250,000 in 1992. Stelly had previously worked at KOGT in college. On December 28, 2021, Stelly announced that KOGT would shut down on December 31, in part due to a "changing media"; the announcement did not disclose if the station's license would be sold or surrendered to the FCC. At 6:00 p.m. that night, the KOGT transmitter went dark for the last time; The final song playing on the station was How Do I Live by Trisha Yearwood, followed by the station's sign off notice, and then the national anthem. As of March 2024, the KOGT website remained active without the station's frequency under the brand, KOGT.com.

The license was surrendered to the FCC on February 16, 2023, and cancelled the same day.
