= Gary Burbank =

American radio personality (1941–2025)

- Born: Billy Purser; July 29, 1941; Memphis, Tennessee, U.S.
- Died: August 28, 2025 (aged 84)

Billy Purser (July 29, 1941 – August 28, 2025), known professionally as Gary Burbank, was an American radio personality. He was heard daily on WLW in Cincinnati, Ohio, from June 15, 1981, until December 21, 2007, and nationally as the voice of his fictional character, Earl Pitts, in nationally syndicated commentaries until 2021.

== Early life and radio career ==
Burbank was born in Memphis, Tennessee, in July 1941. He began his radio career as "Bill Williams" at KLPL in Lake Providence, Louisiana, then adopted the name "Johnny Apollo" when he worked at KUZN in West Monroe, Louisiana. That was followed by stints in his hometown at WMPS in the mid-1960s and then in 1967 and early 1968 at WWUN in Jackson, Mississippi. In 1968 he moved to Louisville, Kentucky, where he became an instant hit on WAKY. It was at WAKY that Billy Purser officially became Gary Burbank, a name taken from radio and television legend Gary Owens, who as a regular on Rowan and Martin's Laugh-In would announce that he was broadcasting from "beautiful downtown Burbank." (Burbank's natural voice was remarkably similar to Owens' on-air voice, and Owens contributed announcements to Burbank's programs in later years.)

Burbank left WAKY in 1973; during his final program, there was an elaborate prank in which he pretended to be fatally shot by a disgruntled listener. At that point, he moved to New Orleans for a brief stint as program director of WNOE. From New Orleans, Burbank went on to CKLW in Detroit/Windsor in the mid 70's, and then back to Louisville for a successful, lengthy afternoon gig on WHAS-AM. Burbank left Louisville again for a brief spell in Tampa, Florida at WDAE, but moved to the Ohio Valley in 1981 when he signed with WLW, originally doing morning drive time but later moving to afternoons. It is there that he enjoyed his greatest success, developing his best-known characters:

- Earl Pitts Uhmerikun, a full-blooded redneck who makes daily commentary on everything from politics to family to friends.
- Gilbert Gnarley, a senior citizen who made crank calls to various businesses and people.
- Howlin' Blind Muddy Slim, Your 60-Minute Jelly-Belly Toejam Man (a/k/a Blues Break 201), a Friday afternoon music show which featured blues artists as guest stars.
- Eunice and Bernice, the "Siamese twins joined at the telephone" ("turr-a-bull, turr-a-bull, turr-a-bull")
- The Right Rev. Deuteronomy Skaggs, radio preacher who encouraged listeners to "dig in them jeans and pull out them greens" (money). Skaggs and Eunice and Bernice carried over from Burbank's WHAS days.
- Ranger Bob, children's show host.
- Joe DeBoss, a little Italian boss who gave advice and then welcomed your opinion; to which a mob thug would suggest mob ways to deal with you, if you had an opposing view-point. Then Joe DeBoss, chuckling at what the thug said he would do, would then say, "Maybe you should just keep your opinion to yourself." (more chuckling)
- Riley Gert, of the U.S. Senseless Survey, who prank calls people asking obscure and sometimes awkward questions for the Survey. Riley was not actually a characterization of Gary Burbank, but of his sidekick Doc Wolfe.
- The Synonymous Bengal, a mole in the Cincinnati Bengals organization who calls in to provide anonymous rumors about the team using frequent malapropisms.
- Lars Peavey, talk show host (tribute to the comedy team of Bob and Ray)
- Dan Buckles, newscaster (takeoff on Dan Rather and David Brinkley); his on-air partners, Kevin "Doc" Wolfe and Leah Burns, portrayed vocal spoofs of Sam Donaldson and Diane Sawyer in the news segment. Buckles didn't hide the fact that he loved to dress in women's clothing and often made comments about his high heels or how tight his dress happened to be as he transitioned from one news item to the next.
- Portia Lynn Commode, reporter
- Ludlow Bromley, the "richest dude in the world" (named after Northern Kentucky cities)
- Bass Ackwards, news commentator
- Thelma Hooch, helpful hints
- Maw Hirishi, advice columnist
- Bruiser LaRue, football player
- Big Fat, AKA, The Big Fat Balding Guy With a Stubby Cigar in His Mouth and His Pants Half-Zipped, pushy con man seller of a wide variety of worthless junk. Often joined by his mascot, Timmy the Termite who would endorse the product or pretend to be a famous celebrity endorsing the junk. Sign off line was always "And dis time I'm being honest wit' youse."

Burbank regularly satirized former Cincinnati mayor Jerry Springer, along with other local politicians, newscasters, and celebrities, such as former Cincinnati Reds owner "Saint CEO" Marge Schott. Satirical radio serials were also used to lampoon the (often struggling) Reds baseball team ("The Reds and the Restless", "The Hunt for Reds October") and the Cincinnati Bengals ("All My Bengals"). Burbank also hit the Top 100 in 1980 with the song "Who Shot J. R.?", a novelty record about the cliffhanger on that year's season finale of Dallas.

Another feature of his show was the sports trivia quiz show Sports or Consequences which ran during the 4:00 hour during his afternoon show on 700 WLW. The show was unusual in that the callers asked the hosts (Burbank and his supporting cast, plus a number of other WLW on air personalities) sports trivia questions, instead of the hosts asking the callers questions. If questions were not asked in proper form, the caller could expect the call to end with a loud boom (and a sound clip: "sounded like a big supplosion"). Proper form included not asking if the panel would, or could, answer with the correct name or fact..."Can we? YES!" Upon expressing satisfaction that they had answered correctly, the panel broke out in chant; "Heyyy! We don't...we don't...we don't mess around...HEY!"

Burbank often did his show from a home in north central Florida, while the rest of his show's cast and crew was in the WLW studios in Cincinnati.

Burbank's show in the late 1990s was syndicated out of WLW to other regional stations (including WTVN in Columbus, WAKR in Akron and WERE in Cleveland). By 1999, the show would revert to being only on WLW, although a weekly "best-of" show dubbed the Weekly Rear-View – which featured mostly character bits and little-to-no Cincinnati-centric material – would run until his retirement. The network (and eventually, the program itself) was called "The BBC: The Broad-bank Burb-casting Corporation," a send-up of Gary Owens' classic line.

Today, Earl Pitts' daily "commentaries" are still syndicated throughout the country on about 200 stations. Burbank's show was also eventually heard, along with the rest of WLW's programming, on XM Satellite Radio Channel 173.

Burbank won several major awards, including back-to-back Marconi Awards as Large Market Personality of the Year in 1990 and 1991.

In November 2012, Burbank was inducted into the National Radio Hall of Fame.

== Restaurant ownership ==
Burbank founded and co-owned Burbank's Real Bar-B-Q and Ribs restaurant in Sharonville, Ohio. In December 2009, the restaurant closed.

The Sharonville restaurant was the first to open and last to close. There were others, including one at I-75 and US 42 in Florence, Kentucky, Louisville, Kentucky and one on Colonel Glenn Highway in Fairborn, Ohio near Wright State University and Wright Patterson Air Force Base, and for a brief period, one in Columbus, Ohio at the corner of Bethel and Sawmill Roads. There were also locations at 3300 Parkcrest Lane in Western Hills and another one in the Eastgate area of Cincinnati.

== Retirement and death ==
On March 7, 2007, Burbank announced that he would retire on December 31, at the expiration of his contract. The last show was broadcast on Friday, December 21, 2007. Despite Burbank's retirement, Earl Pitts' commentaries continued to broadcast on its network of affiliates including WLW. Burbank finally ended the Pitts commentaries on January 1, 2021, citing age and health problems.

On September 23, 2009, Burbank returned to the airwaves at his old timeslot with then-hosts Eddie Fingers and Tracy Jones promoting his new book "Voices In My Head."

Burbank died on August 28, 2025, at the age of 84.
