= WJMF-LD =

Television station in Jackson, Mississippi

- Jackson, Mississippi; United States
- Channels: Digital: 6 (VHF); Virtual: 6

Programming
- Affiliations: Independent

Ownership
- Owner: Rainey Radio; (Kid's Television, LLC)
- Sister stations: WFQY, WZQK

History
- Founded: February 9, 1996
- Former call signs: W53BO (1997–2001); WJMF-LP (2001–2022)
- Former channel numbers: Analog: 53 (UHF), 19 (UHF, until 2011), 6 (VHF, 2011–2021); Radio: 87.7 MHz (FM, 2011–2021)
- Former affiliations: Univision (until 2009); Oldies/Classic hits (radio format, 2011–2021); Silent (2009–2011, 2021–2022)

Technical information
- Licensing authority: FCC
- Facility ID: 26253
- ERP: 0.051 kW; 3 kW (CP)
- HAAT: 94.4 m (310 ft)
- Transmitter coordinates: 32°17′9″N 90°12′43″W

Links
- Public license information: LMS

WJMF-LD (channel 6) is a low-power television station in Jackson, Mississippi, United States. The station is owned by Rainey Radio. WJMF-LD's transmitter is located on Kerr Drive (off US 80) on Jackson's south side.

== History ==
WJMF-LP was previously an affiliate of Univision, rebroadcasting a satellite feed of KUOK in Oklahoma City, a former sister station under Equity Media Holdings; consequently, WJMF-LP was Univision's sole affiliate in Mississippi, as well as the state's only Spanish-language TV station in general. WJMF even broadcast KUOK station identifications and Oklahoma ads.

It was originally announced that WJMF would become a LAT TV affiliate. However, Equity placed LAT TV on co-owned WJXF-LP instead. (That station would later switch to Equity's Retro Jams network, before closing down in 2010.)

WJMF was sold at auction to Rainey Radio on April 16, 2009; this separated it from KUOK, which was sold to Tyler Media. The sale closed on July 10, 2009. In early 2011, WJMF-LP was relocated to channel 6, when it was relaunched as an oldies/classic hits-formatted radio station, "EZ 87.7".

In June 2015, a Saturday evening request show was added to the station. The name of its host is Gearshift Gary.

On July 13, 2021, WJMF-LP signed off shortly before midnight. Its format (classic hits) had already moved to WZQK.

The station was licensed for digital operation on January 11, 2022; its call sign was changed to WJMF-LD.
