= KLDX =

K-Love radio station in Sioux Center, Iowa

- Sioux Center, Iowa; United States
- Frequency: 88.5 MHz

Programming
- Format: Contemporary Christian
- Network: K-Love

Ownership
- Owner: Educational Media Foundation

History
- First air date: August 16, 1968
- Former call signs: KDCR (1967–2021)
- Former frequencies: 91.3 MHz (1968–1981)
- Call sign meaning: K-Love

Technical information
- Licensing authority: FCC
- Facility ID: 17314
- Class: C1
- ERP: 100,000 watts
- HAAT: 151.0 meters
- Transmitter coordinates: 43°5′2.5″N 96°9′53.7″W

Links
- Public license information: Public file; LMS
- Webcast: Listen live
- Website: klove.com

KLDX (88.5 FM) is a radio station in Sioux Center, Iowa, owned by Educational Media Foundation and airing the K-Love network. It was originally established by Dordt University (then Dordt College) and was operated by the school from 1968 to 2021.

== History ==
KDCR signed on August 16, 1968, at 91.3 MHz; it broadcast with 48,000 watts. It moved to 88.5 MHz in 1981 in order to increase power to 100,000 watts. KDCR followed closely the Christian Reformed Church in North America tradition that gave rise and shape to Dordt University.

=== Sale to EMF ===
On March 22, 2021, Dordt University announced that, due to declining listener support and ongoing costs, it would sell KDCR to the Educational Media Foundation, which would begin programming K-Love on May 15; Dordt sporting events would continue to stream online. The call letters were changed to KLDX on May 15, 2021, coinciding with the beginning of the operating agreement. The sale, at a price of $200,000, was consummated on July 1, 2021.
