= Rossella Panarese =

Italian radio personality (1960–2021)

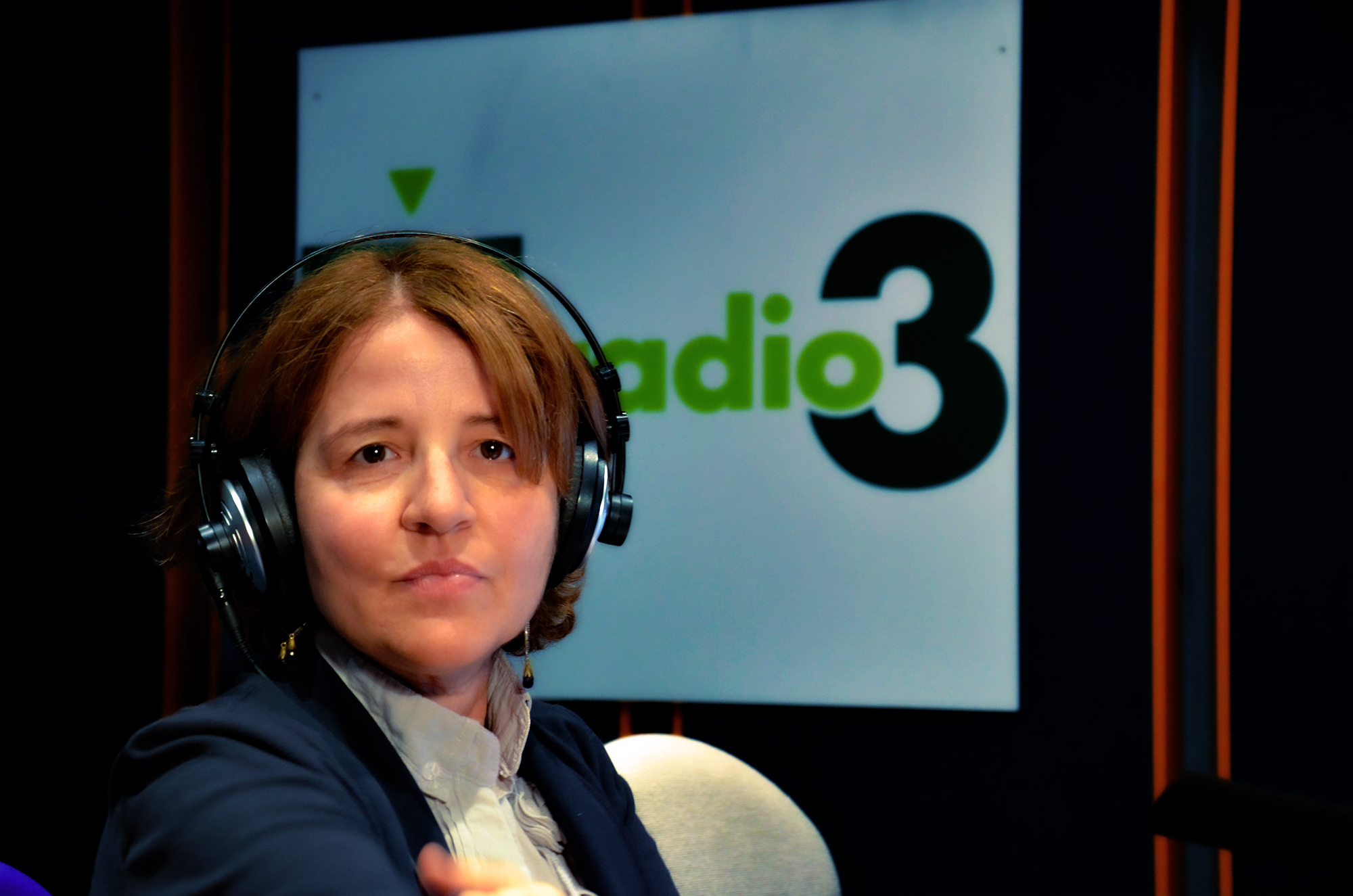
- Rossella Panarese in the Radio3 studios of via Asiago in Rome
- Born: 23 October 1960; Rome, Italy
- Died: 1 March 2021 (aged 60); Rome, Italy
- Occupation: journalist

Rossella Panarese (23 October 1960 – 1 March 2021) was an Italian radio personality, programme editor, and speaker. In 2003, she conceived and managed the Radio3 Scienza program, for the Italian radio channel Rai Radio 3.

She graduated from the International School for Advanced Studies, located in Trieste, Italy, and from La Sapienza University.

She led the Science Festival at the Roma Tre University.

== Published works ==
- 2021: Comunicazione scientifica, with an introduction by Chiara Valerio, in “Enciclopedia Italiana”, X Appendice, Istituto della Enciclopedia Italiana Treccani. ISBN 9788812009572
- 2020: Carlo Bernardini e l’arte di raccontare la scienza: un ricordo personale, in Rino Falcone, Pietro Greco, Giulio Peruzzi (editors), La scienza fra etica e politica. L’eredità di Carlo Bernardini e le prospettive future, Dedalo Edizioni, 2020.
