= Germán Gamonal =

Chilean journalist and radio personality (1932–2021)

- Born: José Germán Rosales Gamonal; October 22, 1932
- Died: April 20, 2021 (aged 88)
- Occupations: journalist, radio personality

José Germán Rosales Gamonal (22 October 1932 – 20 April 2021) was a Chilean journalist, author and radio personality.

== Biography ==
Gamonal was born in Santiago de Chile. Known for his political journalism, he worked for Radio Minería, El Conquistador FM, Chilean Radio — where he served as the director of the station — and Radio Portales de Santiago, where he represented La Crónica Política programme until his retirement in 2015.

Gamonal died on April 20, 2021, aged 89. On April 22, Senate of Chile stood for a moment's silence to honor him.

== Works ==
- Jorge Alessandri, the man, the politician (1987).
- History of the elections in Chile, 1920-2005 (2005).
