= WYSX =

Contemporary hit radio station in Morristown, New York, United States

- Morristown, New York; United States
- Broadcast area: Ogdensburg, New York
- Frequency: 96.7 MHz
- Branding: 96.7 Yes FM

Programming
- Format: Contemporary hit radio

Ownership
- Owner: Stephens Media Group; (Stephens Media Group Ogdensburg, LLC)
- Sister stations: WNCQ-FM, WPAC

History
- First air date: February 14, 1992; 34 years ago
- Former call signs: WXED (1992–1992); WNYP-FM (1992–1993); WNCQ-FM (1993–2004); WPAC (2004-2004)

Technical information
- Licensing authority: FCC
- Facility ID: 49708
- Class: C3
- ERP: 17,000 watts
- HAAT: 108.0 meters (355')
- Transmitter coordinates: 44°34′43″N 75°30′51″W

Links
- Public license information: Public file; LMS
- Webcast: Listen Live
- Website: yesfm.com

WYSX (96.7 FM) is a radio station broadcasting a contemporary hit radio format branded as "96.7 Yes FM" licensed to Morristown, New York, United States. The station is owned by Stephens Media Group. WYSX's studios are located in Ogdensburg, New York while its transmitter is located near Stone Church Rd and County Rd 6.

== History ==
The station went on the air as WXED on February 14, 1992. On May 18, 1992, the station changed its call sign to WNYP-FM; another callsign change occurred on March 15, 1993, to WNCQ-FM; once more on June 23, 2004, to WPAC; & finally on July 2, 2004, to the current WYSX.

The station was previously owned by Martz Communications Group, and was acquired by Stephens as of February 1, 2008.
