= Radio3 Scienza =

Radio3 Scienza is a cultural programme dealing with science and the links between science and society, produced by the Italian radio channel Rai Radio 3. Broadcast every Monday to Friday morning between 10.50 and 11.30, it forms part of the station's programming strand known as Il Terzo Anello ("The Third Ring").

The programme both reports science news and investigates issues of public concern, through discussion with scientific researchers and book and press reviews. Radio3 Scienza broadcasts special editions in connection with the Festival della Scienza in Genoa, the Festival della Matematica and the Festival delle Scienze in Rome, the International Book Fair and the Salone del Gusto in Turin, and the Trieste International Science Media Fair (FEST), as well as from the Teatro Palladium in Rome.

Radio3 Scienza originated from an idea by Rossella Panarese, who continued as the programme editor and leading speaker. The first edition of the programme was broadcast on 6 January 2003 with Claudia Di Giorgio at the microphone and Cristiana Castellotti, Giovanni Spataro, Mariangela Spitella, and Francesca Tuzi forming the editorial staff. Since then the programme has gone out every weekday, including all public holiday except New Year's Day. Over the years, Radio3 Scienza has frequently changed its voice and format. The presenters who spoke in the past are Rossella Castelnuovo, Pietro Greco, Fabio Pagan, and Elisabetta Tola. A fifth and very popular presenter, Franco Carlini, died in August 2007.

The current editorial staff consists of Paolo Conte, Matteo De Giuli, Roberta Fulci and Marco Motta. The programme producer is Costanza Confessore. Former members of staff include Silvia Bencivelli, Andrea Gentile, Antonella Alba, Luca Tancredi Barone, Matteo Bartocci, Cettina Flaccavento (producer), Chiara Fanelli, Piero Pugliese (producer) and Chiara Valerio.

An on-line archive of Radio3 Scienza editions is available at the programme's official website.
