= WFLO-FM =

- Farmville, Virginia; United States
- Broadcast area: Southside Virginia
- Frequency: 95.7 MHz

Programming
- Format: Contemporary Christian
- Network: K-Love

Ownership
- Owner: Educational Media Foundation

History
- First air date: May 1961

Technical information
- Licensing authority: FCC
- Facility ID: 12320
- Class: B
- ERP: 50,000 watts
- HAAT: 150 meters (490 ft)
- Transmitter coordinates: 37°19′35.0″N 78°23′9.0″W

Links
- Public license information: Public file; LMS
- Webcast: Listen live
- Website: klove.com

WFLO-FM (95.7 FM) is a contemporary Christian-formatted broadcast radio station licensed to Farmville, Virginia, serving Southside Virginia. WFLO-FM is owned and operated by Educational Media Foundation.

In January 2021, Educational Media Foundation agreed to buy Colonial Broadcasting Company's WFLO and WFLO-FM. WFLO ended its broadcast as full service on December 31. After the sale EMF converted WFLO-FM to a non-commercial affiliate of its K-Love Christian music network and divested the AM station to Heart of Virginia Communications.
