= WFLO (AM) =

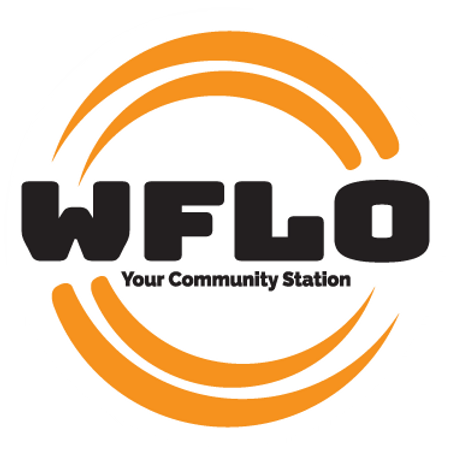
- Farmville, Virginia; United States
- Broadcast area: Prince Edward County and Richmond City
- Frequency: 870 kHz

Programming
- Format: Full-service

Ownership
- Owner: Heart of Virginia Communications

History
- First air date: August 1947

Technical information
- Licensing authority: FCC
- Facility ID: 12317
- Class: D
- Power: 1,000 watts day
- Transmitter coordinates: 37°19′35.0″N 78°23′9.0″W

Links
- Public license information: Public file; LMS
- Webcast: Listen Live
- Website: wflo.net

WFLO (870 kHz) is a full-service formatted broadcast radio station licensed to Farmville, Virginia, serving Farmville, Prince Edward County, Virginia and Richmond City, Virginia and also live streaming on iHeartRadio. WFLO is owned and operated by Heart of Virginia Communications.

In January 2021, Educational Media Foundation agreed to buy Colonial Broadcasting Company's WFLO and WFLO-FM. WFLO ended its broadcast as full service on December 31. After the sale, EMF converted both stations to K-Love and divested the AM station to Heart of Virginia Communications. WFLO relaunched as "870 WFLO" on December 1, 2022.
