= 1998 in literature =

This article contains information about the literary events and publications of 1998.

== Events ==
- March 5 – Tennessee Williams' 1938 play Not About Nightingales receives its stage première in London, in a collaboration between the Royal National Theatre of Great Britain and Corin and Vanessa Redgrave's Moving Theatre.
- October
  - The death of the Poet Laureate of the United Kingdom Ted Hughes leaves a gap of several months before a successor, Andrew Motion, is designated the following spring.
  - Kinoko Nasu (奈須きのこ) launches the Kara no Kyōkai series, with five chapters released online.
- November 18 – Alice McDermott wins the National Book Award with her novel Charming Billy.
- December – The Strand Magazine title is revived in the United States.

== New books ==
=== Fiction ===
- Turki al-Hamad – Adama (first volume in Atyaf al-Aziqah al-Mahjurah (Phantoms of the Deserted Alley) trilogy)
- Tariq Ali – The Book of Saladin
- Aaron Allston
  - Iron Fist
  - Wraith Squadron
- Hanan al-Shaykh – I Sweep the Sun off Rooftops (أكنس الشمس عن السطوح)
- Martin Amis – Heavy Water and Other Stories (most stories previously published)
- Beryl Bainbridge – Master Georgie
- Iain M. Banks – Inversions
- Alessandro Barbero – Romanzo russo. Fiutando i futuri supplizi (translated 2010 as The Anonymous Novel. Sensing the Future Torments)
- Julian Barnes – England, England
- Greg Bear
  - Dinosaur Summer
  - Foundation and Chaos
- Raymond Benson – The Facts of Death
- Alfred Bester and Roger Zelazny – Psychoshop
- Robert Bloch – Flowers from the Moon and Other Lunacies
- Roberto Bolaño – The Savage Detectives (Los Detectives Salvajes)
- William Boyd – Armadillo
- Giannina Braschi – Yo-Yo Boing!
- Anne Carson – Autobiography of Red (verse novel)
- Driss Chraïbi – Muhammad
- Mary Higgins Clark – All Through the Night
- Tom Clancy – Rainbow Six
- Paulo Coelho – Veronika Decides to Die
- Michael Connelly – Blood Work
- Bernard Cornwell – Sharpe's Triumph
- Patricia Cornwell – Point of Origin
- Douglas Coupland – Girlfriend in a Coma
- Ann C. Crispin – Rebel Dawn
- Michael Cunningham – The Hours
- Nelson DeMille – Plum Island
- August Derleth
  - The Final Adventures of Solar Pons
  - In Lovecraft's Shadow
- Peter Dickinson – The Kin
- Allan W. Eckert – Return to Hawk's Hill
- Bret Easton Ellis – Glamorama
- Giles Foden – The Last King of Scotland
- Diana Gabaldon – Hellfire
- Neil Gaiman – Smoke and Mirrors (mainly reprints)
- Andrew Greeley – A Midwinter's Tale
- John Grisham – The Street Lawyer
- Wolf Haas – Komm, süßer Tod (Come, Sweet Death)
- Margaret Peterson Haddix - Among the Hidden
- Ha Jin (哈金) – Waiting
- Tomson Highway – Kiss of the Fur Queen
- Nick Hornby – About a Boy
- Michel Houellebecq – Atomised (Les Particules élémentaires)
- Marek S. Huberath – Gniazdo światów (Nest of Worlds)
- John Irving – A Widow for One Year
- K. W. Jeter
  - The Mandalorian Armor
  - Slave Ship
- Wayne Johnston – The Colony of Unrequited Dreams
- Stephen King – Bag of Bones
- Barbara Kingsolver – The Poisonwood Bible
- Dean R. Koontz – Seize the Night
- Joe R. Lansdale
  - Rumble Tumble
  - The Boar
- Alain Mabanckou – Bleu-Blanc-Rouge
- Patrick McCabe – Breakfast on Pluto
- Ian McEwan – Amsterdam
- Roy MacLaren – African Exploits
- Steve Martin – Pure Drivel
- Carol Matas – Greater Than Angels
- China Miéville – King Rat
- Alice Munro – The Love of a Good Woman
- Haruki Murakami (村上 春樹) – The Wind-Up Bird Chronicle (ねじまき鳥クロニクル, Nejimakidori Kuronikuru)
- Cees Nooteboom – All Souls' Day (Allerzielen)
- Sigrid Nunez – Mitz: The Marmoset of Bloomsbury
- Tim O'Brien – Tomcat in Love
- Orhan Pamuk – My Name Is Red (Benim Adım Kırmızı)
- Tom Perrotta – Election
- Terry Pratchett
  - Carpe Jugulum
  - The Last Continent
- Fahmida Riaz – Godavari
- David Adams Richards – The Bay of Love and Sorrows
- José Luis Rodríguez Pittí – Crónica de invisibles
- Philip Roth – I Married a Communist
- Margit Sandemo – Ensam i världen (Alone in the World)
- Michael Slade – Shrink (also Primal Scream)
- Alexander McCall Smith – The No. 1 Ladies' Detective Agency
- Michael Stackpole – I, Jedi
- Danielle Steel
  - The Klone and I
  - The Long Road Home
  - Mirror Image
- Thomas Sullivan – The Martyring
- Andrew Vachss – Safe House
- Connie Willis – To Say Nothing of the Dog
- A. N. Wilson – Dream Children
- Tom Wolfe – A Man in Full
- Timothy Zahn – Vision of the Future

=== Children and young people ===
- David Almond – Skellig
- Melvin Burgess – Junk
- Denise Fleming – Mama Cat Has Three Kittens
- Gayle Greeno (with Michael Gilbert) – Sunderlies Seeking
- Tanya Huff – Summon the Keeper
- Diana Wynne Jones – Dark Lord of Derkholm
- Dick King-Smith – The Crowstarver
- Julius Lester – Black Cowboy, Wild Horses: A True Story
- J. Patrick Lewis (with Gary Kelley) – BoshBlobberBosh: Runcible Poems for Edward Lear
- J. K. Rowling – Harry Potter and the Chamber of Secrets
- Louis Sachar – Holes
- Robert Swindells – Abomination
- Judy Waite – Mouse, Look Out!
- Douglas Wood – Rabbit and the Moon

=== Drama ===
- Edward Albee – The Play About the Baby
- Parv Bancil – Made in England (full-length version)
- Marina Carr – By the Bog of Cats
- Michael Frayn – Copenhagen
- David Hare – The Blue Room
- Ted Hughes (translator) – Phèdre
- Elfriede Jelinek – Ein Sportstück (A Sports Piece)
- Bryony Lavery – Frozen
- Terrence McNally – Corpus Christi
- Sol B River
  - The White Witch of Rose Hall
  - River Plays 1 (published)
- Shelagh Stephenson – An Experiment with an Air Pump
- Marius von Mayenburg – Fireface (Feuergesicht)
- Tennessee Williams (died 1983) – Not About Nightingales (first performance; written 1938)

=== Poetry ===
- Seamus Heaney
  - Beowulf (translation)
  - Opened Ground: Poems 1966–1996
- Ted Hughes – Birthday Letters
- Dejan Stojanović – Krugovanje: 1978–1987 (Circling; 2nd edition)

=== Non-fiction ===
- Charlotte Allen – The Human Christ: The Search For The Historical Jesus
- Andrea Ashworth – Once in a House on Fire
- Antony Beevor – Stalingrad
- Harold Bloom – Shakespeare: The Invention of the Human
- Bill Bryson – Notes from a Big Country
- Peter Cannon (editor) – Lovecraft Remembered
- Beth Chatto and Christopher Lloyd – Dear Friend and Gardener
- Corinne Debaine-Francfort – La redécouverte de la Chine ancienne
- Amanda Foreman – Georgiana, Duchess of Devonshire
- John Fowles – Wormholes – Essays and Occasional Writings
- Jonathan Freedland – Bring Home the Revolution
- Sita Ram Goel – Vindicated by Time
- Simon Heffer – Like the Roman: The Life of Enoch Powell
- Adam Hochschild – King Leopold's Ghost: A Story of Greed, Terror and Heroism in Colonial Africa
- A. P. J. Abdul Kalam – India 2020
- Ryszard Kapuściński – Heban (Ebony, translated as The Shadow of the Sun)
- B. B. Lal – India 1947–1997: New Light on the Indus Civilization
- Martin Lee and Marcia Miller – The Mega-fun Multiplication Facts Activity Book
- Eric Liu – The Accidental Asian
- Alan I. Marcus – Building Western Civilization: From the Advent of Writing to the Age of Steam
- Thylias Moss – Tale of a Sky-Blue Dress
- Inga Muscio – Cunt: A Declaration of Independence
- V. S. Naipaul – Beyond Belief: Islamic Excursions among the Converted Peoples
- Gilles Perrault (ed.) – Le Livre noir du capitalisme (The Black Book of Capitalism)
- John Pilger – Hidden Agendas
- Michael Poole – Romancing Mary Jane
- Arun Shourie – Eminent Historians: Their Technology, Their Line, Their Fraud
- Marilee Strong – A Bright Red Scream
- University of Arizona – Hopi Dictionary: Hopìikwa Lavàytutuveni
- Adam Zagajewski – Another Beauty

== Births ==
- March 7 – Amanda Gorman, American poet and activist
- May 15 – Mohammed El-Kurd, Palestinian writer and poet
- December 16 – Chloe Gong, Chinese-born New Zealand author
- unknown dates
  - K-Ming Chang – Taiwanese-American novelist and poet
  - Moses MacKenzie – British novelist

== Deaths ==
- January 2 – Frank Muir, English comedy writer and broadcaster (born 1920)
- January 11 – John Wells, English satirist (born 1936)
- January 18 – Monica Edwards, English children's novelist (born 1912)
- January 23 – John Forbes, Australian poet (heart attack, born 1950)
- January 27 – Geoffrey Trease, English children's historical novelist (born 1909)
- February 7 – Lawrence Sanders, American novelist and short story writer (born 1920)
- February 15 – Martha Gellhorn, American journalist (suicide, born 1908)
- February 17 – Ernst Jünger, German novelist and war memoirist (born 1895)
- February 27 – Alice Rivaz, Swiss writer (born 1901)
- March 15 – Dr. Benjamin Spock, American pediatrician and writer on child care (born 1903)
- April 11 – Francis Durbridge, English playwright (born 1912)
- April 19 – Octavio Paz, Mexican poet and Nobel Prize laureate (born 1914)
- April 27
  - Anne Desclos (Pauline Réage), French journalist and novelist (born 1907)
  - Carlos Castaneda, Mexican-born American anthropologist and author (born 1925)
- May 9 – Nat Perrin, American comedy writer (born 1905)
- May 11 — Willy Corsari, Dutch author of detective fiction (born 1897)
- June 10
  - Joan Adeney Easdale, English poet (born 1913)
  - Hammond Innes, English novelist (born 1913)
- June 11 – Dame Catherine Cookson, English novelist (born 1906)
- July 1 – Martin Seymour-Smith, English biographer (born 1928)
- July 5 – Johnny Speight, English comedy writer (born 1920)
- July 9 – Ian Wallace (John Wallace Pritchard), American science fiction author (born 1912)
- July 14 – Miroslav Holub, Czech poet (born 1923)
- July 23
  - John Hopkins, English film and television writer (born 1931)
  - Manuel Mejía Vallejo, Colombian novelist (born 1923)
- August 16 – Dorothy West, American novelist and short story writer (born 1907)
- August 22 – Grace Paley, American writer (born 1922)
- September 28 – Eric Malling, Canadian journalist (born 1946)
- October 15 – Iain Crichton Smith, Scottish writer (born 1928)
- October 22 – Eric Ambler, English spy novelist (born 1909)
- October 28 – Ted Hughes, English poet and Poet Laureate (born 1930)
- November 3 – Bob Kane (Robert Kahn), American comics artist and writer (born 1915)
- November 8 – Rumer Godden, English novelist (born 1907)
- November 17 – Alexandru Talex, Romanian journalist, critic and biographer (born 1909)
- December 16 – William Gaddis, American novelist (born 1922)

== Awards ==
- Nobel Prize for Literature: José Saramago
- Europe Theatre Prize: Luca Ronconi
- Camões Prize: Antonio Candido

=== Australia ===
- The Australian/Vogel Literary Award: Jennifer Kremmer, Pegasus in the Suburbs
- C. J. Dennis Prize for Poetry: Coral Hull, Broken Land
- Kenneth Slessor Prize for Poetry: No awards this year
- Mary Gilmore Prize: Emma Lew, The Wild Reply
- Miles Franklin Award: Peter Carey, Jack Maggs

=== Canada ===
- Bronwen Wallace Memorial Award: Talya Rubin
- See 1998 Governor General's Awards for a complete list of winners and finalists.
- Giller Prize for Canadian Fiction: Alice Munro: The Love of a Good Woman
- Edna Staebler Award for Creative Non-Fiction: Charlotte Gray: Mrs. King

=== France ===
- Prix Décembre: Michel Houellebecq, Les Particules élémentaires
- Prix Goncourt: Paule Constant, Confidence pour confidence
- Prix Médicis French: Le Loup mongol
- Prix Médicis International: The House of Sleep – Jonathan Coe

=== United Kingdom ===
- Booker Prize: Ian McEwan, Amsterdam
- Carnegie Medal for children's literature: David Almond, Skellig
- James Tait Black Memorial Prize for fiction: Beryl Bainbridge, Master Georgie
- James Tait Black Memorial Prize for biography: Peter Ackroyd, The Life of Thomas More
- Cholmondeley Award: Roger McGough, Robert Minhinnick, Anne Ridler, Ken Smith
- Eric Gregory Award: Mark Goodwin, Joanne Limburg, Patrick McGuinness, Kona Macphee, Esther Morgan, Christiania Whitehead, Frances Williams
- Orange Prize for Fiction: Carol Shields, Larry's Party
- Queen's Gold Medal for Poetry: Les Murray
- Whitbread Best Book Award: Ted Hughes, Birthday Letters

=== United States ===
- Agnes Lynch Starrett Poetry Prize: Shara McCallum, The Water Between Us
- Aiken Taylor Award for Modern American Poetry: X.J. Kennedy
- American Academy of Arts and Letters Gold Medal for Drama: Horton Foote
- American Book Award Before Columbus Foundation: Angela Davis, Blues Legacies and Black Feminism: Gertrude "Ma" Rainey, Bessie Smith, and Billie Holiday, and (separately) Allison Hedge Coke, Dog Road Woman
- Bernard F. Connors Prize for Poetry: Sherod Santos, "Elegy for My Sister", and (separately) Neil Azevedo, "Caspar Hauser Songs"
- Bobbitt National Prize for Poetry: Frank Bidart, Desire
- Compton Crook Award: Katie Waitman, The Merro Tree
- Hugo Award for Best Novel: Joe Haldeman, Forever Peace
- Frost Medal: Stanley Kunitz
- Nebula Award: Joe Haldeman, Forever Peace
- Newbery Medal for children's literature: Karen Hesse, Out of the Dust
- PEN American Center's PEN Open Book Award: Giannina Braschi, Yo-Yo Boing!
- Pulitzer Prize for Drama: Paula Vogel, How I Learned to Drive
- Pulitzer Prize for Fiction: Philip Roth, American Pastoral
- Pulitzer Prize for Poetry: Charles Wright, Black Zodiac
- Wallace Stevens Award: A. R. Ammons
- Whiting Awards:

Fiction: Michael Byers, Ralph Lombreglia (fiction/nonfiction)
Non-fiction: D. J. Waldie, Anthony Walton
Plays: W. David Hancock
Poetry: Nancy Eimers, Daniel Hall, James Kimbrell, Charles Harper Webb, Greg Williamson

=== Elsewhere ===
- Friedenspreis des Deutschen Buchhandels: Martin Walser
- International Dublin Literary Award: Herta Muller, The Land of Green Plums
- Premio Nadal: Lucía Etxebarria, Beatriz y los cuerpos celestes
