= Jean Suret-Canale =

French historian, Marxist theoretician, activist and World War II Resistance fighter

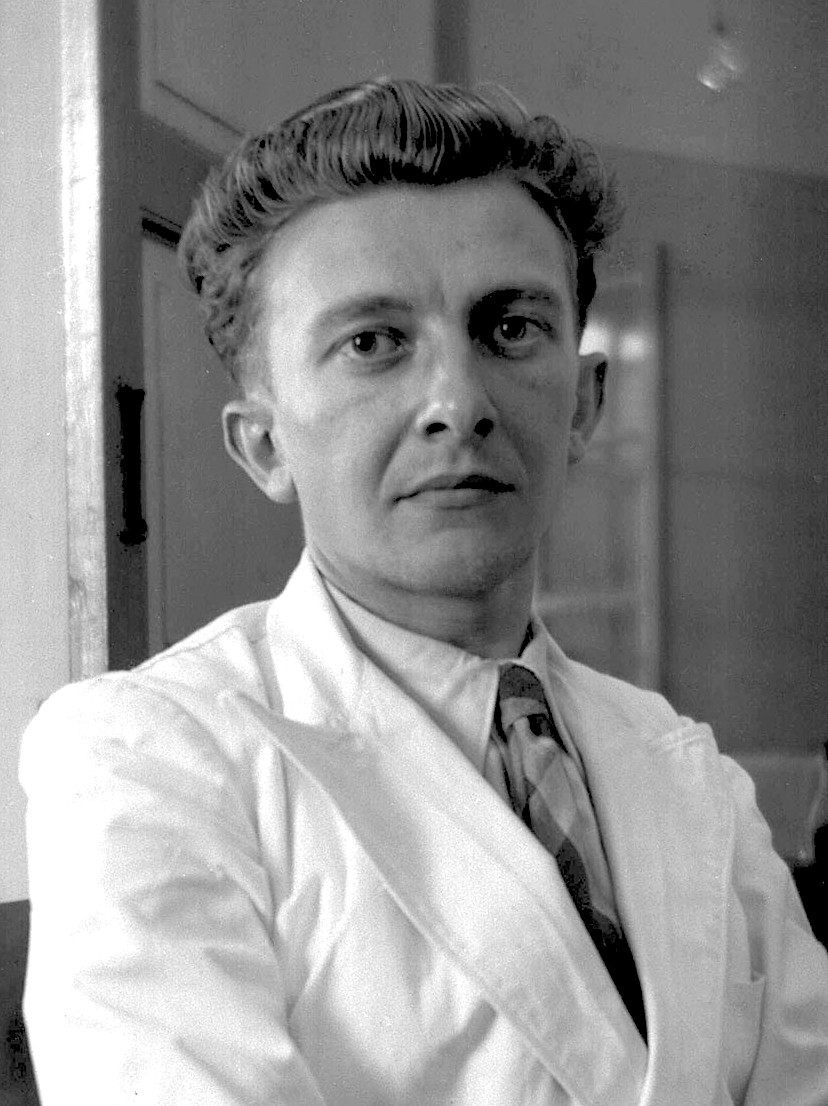
- Jean Suret-Canale
- Born: 27 April 1921
- Died: 23 June 2007 (aged 86); Gironde, Nouvelle-Aquitaine

Jean Suret-Canale (27 April 1921 – 23 June 2007) was a French historian of Africa, Marxist theoretician, political activist, and World War II French Resistance fighter.

Suret-Canale was born to father Victor Suret-Canale (1883–1958), an engraver educated at École nationale supérieure des arts décoratifs, and Thérèse Suret-Canale, a German painter educated first in Germany and then at the Académie Julian in Paris.

As a student, he won scholarships to study in the colony of Dahomey (Benin) in 1938 and French Indochina in 1939. He returned to France, and was an underground member of the jeunesses communistes resistance from 1940 to 1944. During this time he met his wife, Georgette, a feminist journalist, novelist and poet. He received a degree from the Université de Paris (1946) in geography, specialising in the countries of West Africa and African studies.

Returning to French West Africa after the war, he engaged in political and trade union organizing, taught secondary school in Dakar, but was forced to leave the then colony by the French government under military order. He was present during the 1947 Dakar–Niger railway strike on which Ousmane Sembène later based his seminal novel God's Bits of Wood.

Back in France, Suret-Canale found a teaching post in Laval, Mayenne and pursued his political writing while keeping active in the Communist party.

When Guinea became independent he returned to Africa, first teaching in Conakry (Lycée Classique), becoming head of the former local branch of Institut Fondamental d'Afrique Noire (IFAN) (later the Institut National de Recherche et Documentation: the National Library, Archives and Museum of Guinea). Suret-Canale was later head of the Teachers College at Kindia (Ecole Normale Supérieure). In the late 60s, he was again forced to return home by the French government under threat of having his nationality revoked.

While in France Suret-Canale continued his active work in the French Communist Party, but was critical of the Stalinist leadership under Maurice Thorez. Following Stalin's (and Thorez's) death, Suret-Canale became one of the founders of the parties academic center, the Centre d'etudes recherches marxistes (C.E.R.M.) in 1960, where he is most known for developing Marxist theories on the Asiatic mode of production that were later adopteded by theoreticians of national liberation movements in the Third World. For some time was a member of the Central Committee of the PCF, despite having criticized the Politburo as an overly-rigid ruling body.

In retirement he continued to be politically engaged, writing occasional articles for the French paper l'Humanité and continuing his work with AFASPA (Association française d’amitié et de solidarité avec les peuples d’Afrique). He died at his home in Gironde, 16 June 2007 and was buried at La Roquille (Gironde).

Shortly before retiring to Périgord (where he had been in the resistance during the war) Suret-Canale submitted his Doctoral dissertation, a practice common in French academia. His "Africa and Capital" (Afrique et capitaux) brought together much of his research since the fifties or earlier.

His master work is considered to be the three volume L'Afrique Noire Occidentale et Centrale. Only the second volume, covering the colonial period in French controlled Africa, has been translated into English.

== Works ==
- Afrique Noire: l'Ere Coloniale (Editions Sociales, Paris, 1971); Eng. translation, French Colonialism in Tropical Africa, 1900-1945 (Hurst, New York, 1971).
- Afrique Noire: de la Décolonisation aux Indépendances (Editions Sociales, Paris, 1972).
- Afrique Noire, Géographie, Civilisation, Histoire (Editions Sociales, Paris, 1973).
- Les Groupes d'Etudes Communistes (G.E.C.) en Afrique Noire.
- La République de Guinée, Paris. Editions sociales, 1970.
- Essays on African History: From the Slave Trade to Neocolonialism. Preface by Basil Davidson. Translated from the French by Christopher Hurst. C. Hurst & Co., London, 1969.
- Etablissement industriel guinéen.
- "La Guinée dans le système colonial," Présence africaine 29 (Dec. 1959-Janv. 1960).
- Notes sur l'économie guinéenne.
- "La Guinée face à son avenir," Nouvelle revue internationale 9 (Feb. 1966).
- The Fouta-Djalon Chieftaincy: West African Chiefs: Their Changing Status under Colonial Rule and Independence.
- "La fin de la chefferie en Guinée," Journal of African History, 7, No. 3. 1966.
- "Découverte de Samori," Cahiers d'études africaines. 1977 (17)66: 381-388.
- "Tableau économique de la Guinée," Bulletin d'Afrique noire, 12 (Jan. 10) 1966.
- Touba, haut-lieu de l'Islam en Guinée.
- Histoire de l'Afrique Occidentale (with Djibril Tamsir Niane), 1961.
- contributions to The Black Book of Capitalism, 1997.
