= Iran–Morocco relations =

- Iran: Morocco

Relations between the Islamic Republic of Iran and the Kingdom of Morocco are mostly non-existent, and diplomatic relations between the two nations have often been tarred by disputes. On several occasions Iran and Morocco have mostly or completely severed diplomatic relations. Both countries are members of Group of 77 and the Non-Aligned Movement.

== History ==
Tehran cut off all diplomatic ties with Rabat in 1981. This was in response to King Hassan II's decision to give asylum to the exiled Shah Mohammad Reza Pahlavi. It was almost a decade before relations would thaw enough to renew ties. It was almost one decade after that before Abderrahmane Youssoufi, Prime Minister of Morocco at the time, would lead the first Moroccan delegation to the Islamic Republic of Iran. Economic ties increased greatly in recent times.

On 6 March 2009, following an Iranian official's statement that questioned the sovereignty of Sunni-ruled Bahrain, King Mohammed VI of Morocco decided to sever the country's diplomatic relations with Iran. The official's remark sparked a significant backlash from the Sunni Muslim community. Morocco also accused Iran of attempting to spread its Shi’ite version of Islam in the country, which it deemed as a danger to its moderate Sunni religious identity.

In February 2014, the two countries announced they were re-establishing diplomatic ties.

On 2 May 2018, Morocco cut its diplomatic ties with Iran for the third time, with the Moroccan Foreign Minister Nasser Bourita citing alleged Iranian financial and logistical support to the Polisario Front through its Lebanese proxy Hezbollah and the Iranian embassy in Algiers.

== See also ==
- Foreign relations of Iran
- Foreign relations of Morocco
- List of ambassadors of Iran to Morocco
