= I Wanna Be =

I Wanna Be may refer to:

- "I Wanna Be", a 2007 song by Chris Brown from Exclusive
- "I Wanna Be", a 2017 song by Kehlani from SweetSexySavage

== See also ==
- I Want to Be
