= Mirror image (disambiguation) =

Mirror image is an optical effect.

Mirror Image may also refer to:

- "Mirror Image" (short story), 1972 short story by Isaac Asimov
- Mirror Image, 1988 novel by Lucille Fletcher
- Mirror Image (novel), 1998 novel by Danielle Steel
- Mirror Image (Blood, Sweat & Tears album) and song from the 1974 album
- "Mirror Image" (The Twilight Zone), 1960 episode of The Twilight Zone
- "Mirror Image" (Quantum Leap), 1993 episode of the television series Quantum Leap
- "Mirror Image", a song from the 2021 Weezer album, OK Human
- Mirror Image, a video game budget label of Mirrorsoft

== See also ==
- Mirror Images 2, 1993 American film
