= Adam Zagajewski =

Polish poet (1945–2021)

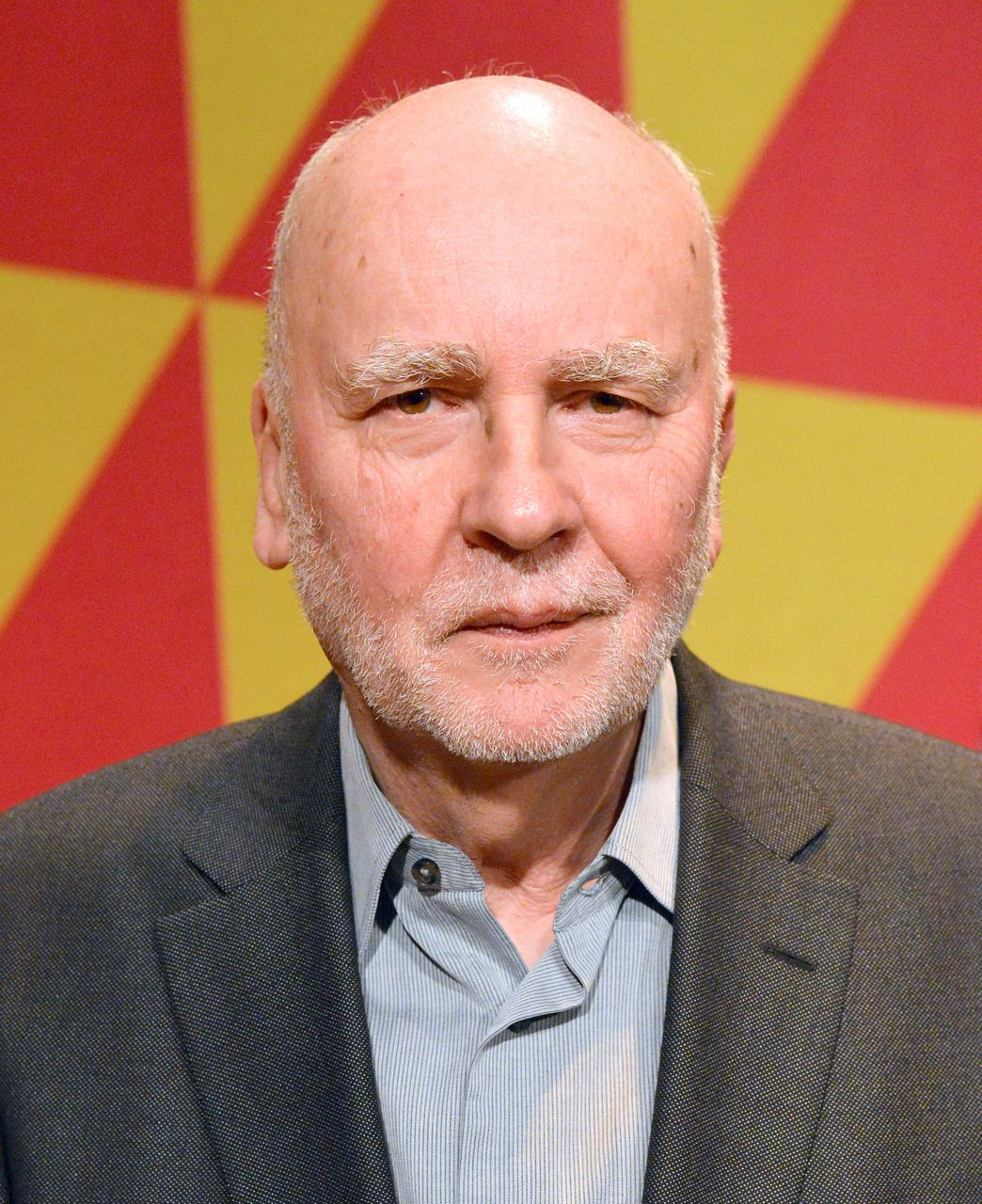
- Adam Zagajewski in 2014
- Born: 21 June 1945; Lwów, Poland
- Died: 21 March 2021 (aged 75); Kraków, Poland
- Education: Jagiellonian University
- Occupations: Poet; essayist; translator
- Writing career
- Notable works: Unseen Hand; Another Beauty; Słuch absolutny; Asymetria
- Notable awards: Struga Poetry Evenings Golden Wreath (2018); Princess of Asturias Award (2017); Griffin Lifetime Recognition Award (2016); Heinrich Mann Prize (2015); Neustadt International Prize for Literature (2004); Vilenica Prize (1996); Kościelski Award (1975)

Adam Zagajewski (21 June 1945 – 21 March 2021) was a Polish poet, novelist, translator, and essayist.

He was awarded the 2004 Neustadt International Prize for Literature, the 2016 Griffin Poetry Prize Lifetime Recognition Award, the 2017 Princess of Asturias Award for Literature, and the 2018 Golden Wreath of Poetry at the Struga Poetry Evenings.

He was considered a leading poet of the Generation of '68, or Polish New Wave (Polish: Nowa fala), and one of Poland's most prominent contemporary poets.

== Life and career ==
Adam Zagajewski was born in 1945 in Lwów (now Lviv, Ukraine). His father was Tadeusz Zagajewski and his mother was Ludwika Zagajewska, née Turska. The Zagajewski family was expelled from Lwów to central Poland the same year as part of Soviet post-World War II policy. They moved to the city of Gliwice where he graduated from Andrzej Strug V High School (V Liceum Ogólnokształcące im. Andrzeja Struga). Subsequently, he studied psychology and philosophy at the Jagiellonian University in Kraków. He later taught philosophy at the AGH University of Science and Technology. In 1967, he made his poetic debut with Music, a poem published in Życie Literackie magazine. He published his works as well as reviews in such magazines as Odra (1969–1976) and Twórczość (1969, 1971–1973). During this time, he became involved in the New Wave (Nowa fala) literary movement also known as the Generation of '68'. The aim of the group was "standing up against the falsifications of reality and the appropriation of language by communist ideology and propaganda".

After signing the Letter of 59 his works were banned by communist authorities in Poland. In 1978, he was one of the founders and first lecturers of the Scientific Training Association. In 1982, he emigrated to Paris, but in 2002 he returned to Poland together with his wife Maja Wodecka, and resided in Kraków. He was a member of the Polish Writers' Association.

His literary works have received international recognition and have been translated into many languages. Joachim T. Baer, a reviewer from World Literature Today pointed out that the recurring themes in Zagajewski's poetry include "the night, dreams, history and time, infinity and eternity, silence and death." Colm Tóibín notes that in his best poems "he has succeeded in making the space of the imagination connect with experience; things seen and heard and remembered in all their limits and sorrow and relished joy have the same power for him as things conjured." American poet Robert Pinsky observes that Zagajewski's poems are "about the presence of the past in ordinary life: history not as a chronicle of the dead … but as an immense, sometimes subtle force inhering in what people see and feel every day – and in the ways we see and feel". His poem "Try To Praise The Mutilated World" became famous when it was printed in The New Yorker shortly after the September 11 attacks.

Zagajewski used to teach poetry workshops as a visiting lecturer at the School of Literature and Arts at the Jagiellonian University in Kraków as well as a creative writing course at the University of Houston in the United States. He was a faculty member at the University of Chicago and a member of its Committee on Social Thought. He taught two classes, one of which was on fellow Polish poet Czesław Miłosz. Commenting on the occasion of his death, Olga Tokarczuk remarked that he was an appreciated teacher of poetry.

Zagajewski died on 21 March 2021 at the age of 75 in Krakow.

== Awards ==
He was awarded the Bronze Cross of Merit, and twice received the Officer's Cross of the Order of Polonia Restituta. In 1992, he received a Guggenheim Fellowship. He won the 2004 Neustadt International Prize for Literature, considered a forerunner to the Nobel Prize in Literature, and is the second Polish writer to be awarded, after Czeslaw Milosz. In 2015 he received the Heinrich Mann Prize. In May 2016 he was awarded the Dr. Leopold Lucas Prize of the University of Tübingen. In the same year he received the Order of Legion d'Honneur and the Janus Pannonius Grand Prize for Poetry (award of the Hungarian PEN Club) as well. In 2017 he was awarded The Princess of Asturias Award, "one of the most important awards in the Spanish-speaking world." In 2018 his collection of essays, Poezja dla początkujących (Poetry for Beginners), was nominated for the Nike Award, Poland's top literary honor. In 2019, Zagajewski was awarded Pour le Mérite for Sciences and Arts. In his lifetime, he was frequently mentioned as a potential Nobel Prize laureate.

== Bibliography ==
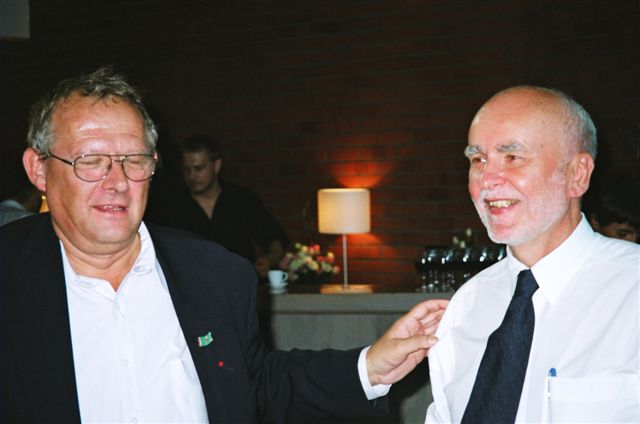
Adam Michnik and Adam Zagajewski in 2004

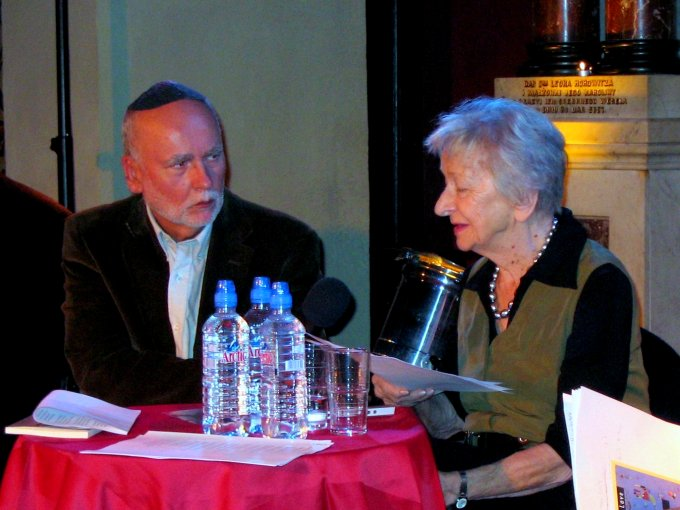
Adam Zagajewski and Wisława Szymborska in 2005

=== Collections ===
==== Poetry ====
- Komunikat. Kraków, 1972. ISBN 978-606-711-947-3
- Sklepy mięsne. Kraków, 1975. ISBN 978-606-711-947-3
- List. Oda do wielkości. Paris, 1983. ISBN 978-2-7168-0030-3
- Jechać do Lwowa. London, 1985. ISBN 978-0-906601-25-9
- Plótno. Paris, 1990. ISBN 978-2-906253-07-0
- Ziemia ognista. Poznan, 1994. ISBN 978-83-85568-09-4
- Trzej aniołowie / Three Angels. Kraków, 1998 (bilingual edition of selected poems). ISBN 978-83-08-02780-6
- Pragnienie. Kraków, 1999. ISBN 978-83-85568-43-8
- Powrót. Kraków, 2003. ISBN 978-83-240-0339-6
- Anteny. Kraków, 2005. ISBN 978-83-85568-75-9
- Unseen Hand (Niewidzialna reka). Kraków, 2009. ISBN 978-83-240-1246-6
- Wiersze wybrane. Kraków, 2010. ISBN 978-83-61298-68-7
- Asymetria. Kraków, 2014. ISBN 978-83-61298-76-2
- Lotnisko w Amsterdamie / Airport in Amsterdam. Kraków, 2016 (bilingual edition of selected poems). ISBN 978-83-61298-92-2
- Prawdziwe życie. Kraków, 2019. ISBN 978-83-65614-25-4

==== Prose ====
- Ciepło, zimno. Warszawa, 1975. OCLC 454835659
- Słuch absolutny. Kraków, 1979. OCLC 1036346563
- Cienka kreska. Kraków, 1983. ISBN 978-83-7006-088-6

==== Essays ====
- Świat nieprzedstawiony. Kraków, 1974. OCLC 69284381
- Drugi oddech. Kraków, 1978. OCLC 5403843
- Solidarność i samotność. "Zeszyty literackie", 1986. ISBN 978-83-917979-0-7
- Dwa miasta. Paryż-Kraków, 1991. ISBN 978-83-85158-33-2
- Another Beauty (W cudzym pięknie). Poznań, 1998. ISBN 978-83-85568-94-0
- Obrona żarliwosci. Kraków, 2002. ISBN 978-83-85568-57-5
- Poeta rozmawia z filozofem. Warszawa, 2007. ISBN 978-83-60046-85-2
- Lekka przesada. Kraków, 2011. ISBN 978-83-61298-29-8
- Poezja dla początkujących. Warszawa, 2017. ISBN 978-83-64648-57-1
- Substancja nieuporządkowana. Kraków, 2019. ISBN 978-83-240-5869-3

=== Books in English translation ===
==== Poetry ====
- Tremor Translator Renata Gorczynski, Collins Harvill, 1987 ISBN 978-0-00-271910-0
- Canvas Translators Renata Gorczynski, Benjamin Ivry, C. K. Williams, Farrar, Straus and Giroux, 1994, ISBN 978-0-374-52398-5
- Mysticism for Beginners: Poems. Farrar, Straus and Giroux. 15 April 1999. ISBN 978-0-374-52687-0.
- Without End: New and Selected Poems. Translated by Clare Cavanagh. Farrar, Straus and Giroux. 18 March 2003. ISBN 978-0-374-52861-4.
- Selected Poems, Translator Clare Cavanagh, Faber & Faber, 2004, ISBN 978-0-571-22425-8
- Eternal Enemies: Poems. Farrar, Straus and Giroux. 28 October 2014. ISBN 978-1-4668-8424-3.
- Unseen Hand: Poems (2011) ISBN 978-0-374-53336-6
- Asymmetry: Poems. Farrar, Straus and Giroux. 20 November 2018. ISBN 978-0-374-10647-8.
- True Life, Translator Clare Cavanagh, 2023, Farrar, Straus and Giroux ISBN 978-0-374-60156-0

==== Essays ====
- Solidarity, Solitude, Ecco Press, 1990, ISBN 978-0-88001-186-0
- Two Cities: On Exile, History, and the Imagination. University of Georgia Press. 1995. ISBN 978-0-8203-2409-8.
- Another Beauty. University of Georgia Press. 2002. ISBN 978-0-8203-2410-4.
- A Defense of Ardor: Essays. Translated by Clare Cavanagh. Farrar, Straus and Giroux. 28 October 2014. ISBN 978-1-4668-8423-6.
- Slight Exaggeration: An Essay. Trans. Clare Cavanagh. Farrar, Straus and Giroux. 4 April 2017. ISBN 978-0-374-26587-8.

==== Edited ====
- Polish Writers on Writing (Trinity University Press, 2007)

=== Critical studies and reviews ===
- Carpenter, Bogdana (2005). "A Tribute to Adam Zagajewski". World Literature Today. 79 (2): 14–15. ISSN 0196-3570. JSTOR 40158662.
- Cavanagh, Clare (2005). "Lyric and Public: The Case of Adam Zagajewski". World Literature Today. 79 (2): 16–19. doi:10.2307/40158663. ISSN 0196-3570. JSTOR 40158663.
- Kay, Magdalena (2005). "Place and Imagination in the Poetry of Adam Zagajewski". World Literature Today. 79 (2): 20–22. doi:10.2307/40158664. ISSN 0196-3570. JSTOR 40158664.
- Kay, Magdalena (2012). Knowing One's Place in Contemporary Irish and Polish Poetry: Zagajewski, Mahon, Heaney, Hartwig. New York: Continuum. ISBN 978-1-62356-281-6.
- Krivak, Andrew (9 May 2003). "The Language of Redemption: The Catholic Poets Adam Zagajewski, Marie Ponsot & Lawrence Joseph". Commonweal. 130 (9): 12–14. ISSN 0010-3330..
- Shallcross, Bozena (2002). Through the Poet's Eye: The Travels of Zagajewski, Herbert, and Brodsky. Evanston: Northwestern University Press. ISBN 978-0-8101-1837-9.

== See also ==
- List of Polish people
- List of Polish poets
- Polish literature
