= List of ambassadors of Iran to Morocco =

Coordinates: 33.959279°N 6.842553°W

Ambassador of Iran to Morocco
- Persian: سفیر ایران در مراکش بود
- Coat of Arms of Iran
- Inaugural holder: Morteza Gholi Ghadimi Navai
- Formation: 1958
- Final holder: Mohammed Taqi Moayed
- Abolished: May 1, 2018

The Iranian ambassador in Rabat was the official representative of the Government in Tehran to the Government of Morocco.

Direction of the Embassy:

- Ambassade Imperiale de l'Iran 7 Rue Al-Qassar
- Interest Section: Avenue Bir Kacem

== List of representatives ==
Diplomatic accreditation	Ambassador	Persian language	Observations	Note (typography)	List of presidents of Iran	List of rulers of Morocco	Term end
1958	Morteza Gholi Ghadimi Navai	Persian: مرتضی قدیمی نوایی	In 1971 he was Iranian ambassador to Tunisia		Mohammad Reza Pahlavi	Mohammed V of Morocco	1961
1961	Rokneddin Ashtiani	Persian: رکن‌الدین آشتیانی	In 1971 he was Iranian ambassador to Lebanon		Mohammad Reza Pahlavi	Hassan II of Morocco	
October 12, 1967	Ahmed Ali Bahrami	Persian: احمدعلی بهرامی	In 1971 he was the first Iranian diplomat going to Beijing to set up an embassy there.; In Oct. 1972 he was the first Iranian Ambassador to Kenya in Nairobi, Iranian Ambassador to Sudan.; In June 1975 he was Iranian Ambassador to Norway, Oslo. He traveled to Western Europe, some Asian and African countries.		Mohammad Reza Pahlavi	Hassan II of Morocco	1970
January 25, 1972	Abbas Nayyeri	Persian: عباس نیری			Mohammad Reza Pahlavi	Hassan II of Morocco	
1971	Massoud Foroughi				Mohammad Reza Pahlavi	Hassan II of Morocco	
January 1, 1976	Farhad Sepahbody		Sepahbody was at his post when the Shah and his entourage arrived in Rabat from Aswan a week after flying out of Iran at the height of the Ruhollah Khomeini-led Iranian Revolution. After the fall of the monarchy in February 1979 and the execution of his cousin, the former Prime Minister Amir-Abbas Hoveyda by the new Tehran regime, Sepahbody resigned from the foreign ministry and settled in New York City with his wife, Angela.(Dr. Cyrus J. Sepahbody, son of Ambassador Farhad and Angela Sepahbody of Sedona, Ariz.)		Mohammad Reza Pahlavi	Hassan II of Morocco	April 7, 1979
January 22, 1979			Notre ami le roi granted asylum to the Sha Inshallah in Marrakesh.		Mohammad Reza Pahlavi	Hassan II of Morocco	March 30, 1979
January 22, 1979			Iranian embassies in the Gulf, the US, and elsewhere have almost all removed pictures of the Shah and declared their support for the Bazargan government (see KUWAIT). In Rabat, several Iranian embassy staff declared their support for Khomeini, but ambassador Farhad Sepahbodi, was said to be still supporting the Shah. The Iranian monarch is on an "extended holiday" in Morocco. (Middle East economic digest)		Mohammad Reza Pahlavi	Hassan II of Morocco	March 30, 1979
January 30, 1982			In January 1981, Iran severed diplomatic relations with Jordan and Morocco because of their support of Iraq in the Iran–Iraq War. Iran Severance of Relations With Jordan, Morocco Lauded Tehran ETTELA'AT in Persian 5 Feb 1981, Tehran cut ties with Rabat when King Hassan II decided to give asylum to the U.S.-backed Shah, who had been forced into exile after the Iranian Revolution of 1979 – when Ayatollah Khomeini returned to Iran and established an Islamic Republic. Morocco (Diplomatic relations broken January 81, relations restored, December 91) Head of Interest Section		Abolhassan Banisadr	Hassan II of Morocco	December 30, 1991
November 1, 1988	Ali Asghar Khaji	Persian: علی اصغر خجی	Head of Interest Sectionm		Ali Khamenei	Hassan II of Morocco	February 1, 1991
December 1, 1991			1991 relations restored, 10361 Morocco-Iran Prisoners Freed Tehran freed six Moroccans captured in the 1980-88 Iran–Iraq War war on ... Tehran radio said the men were handed over to Morocco's Charge d' Affaires, Hassan Daoud, who said the release would help expand the two Muslim countries' relations.		Akbar Hashemi Rafsanjani	Hassan II of Morocco	
			For the first time since the shah's administration, Iran appointed an ambassador to Morocco at a time that coincided with the deterioration of its relations with Algeria at the end of last year. Morocco responded to the "goodwill initiative" and King Hassan II received the new Iranian ambassador at the end of January 1 993, thus ending the 14-year		Akbar Hashemi Rafsanjani	Hassan II of Morocco	
1995	Jafar Shamsian	Persian: جعفر شمسیان	Iranian Ambassador in Rabat, Ja'far Shamsiyan, invited Moroccan economic operators, Iranian ambassador to Maghreb, Ja far Shamsiyan		Akbar Hashemi Rafsanjani	Hassan II of Morocco	October 1, 1996
	Hosein Sobhani-Nia	Persian: حسین سبحانی نیا			Akbar Hashemi Rafsanjani	Hassan II of Morocco	January 1, 1998
1999	Mohammad Reza Bakhtiari	Persian: محمدرضا بختیاری			Mohammad Khatami	Mohammed VI of Morocco	2003
2003	Mohammad Masjed Jamei	Persian: محمد مسجدجامعی			Mohammad Khatami	Mohammed VI of Morocco	2005
	Wahid Ahmadi	Persian: أحمدي وحيد	the liberal e-journal www.elaph.com, the expelled Iranian ambassador to Morocco Vahid Ahmadi denied the Rabat accused Iranian ambassador of seeking to spread Shia Islam in the Sunni kingdom. Morocco severs ties with Iran On 7 March, the In 2009, Rabat broke diplomatic links with Tehran after an adviser to Iran's Supreme Leader Ayatollah Ali Khamenei said Iran had sovereign rights over Bahrain., In 2009, Morocco expelled Iran's ambassador and shut down several Iranian schools, charging that Iranians were		Mahmoud Ahmadinejad	Mohammed VI of Morocco	March 7, 2009
February 1, 2014			re-normalization of relations since February 2014		Hassan Rouhani	Mohammed VI of Morocco	
December 29, 2014	Mohammed Taqi Moayed	Persian: محمدتقی مؤید	On December 22, 2014, Iran appointed Mohammed Taqi Moayed as ambassador to Rabat.: He has been Tehran's representative to Tunisia, the Netherlands and Greece in the past.		Hassan Rouhani	Mohammed VI of Morocco	May 1, 2018
June 26, 2015			Rabat - Morocco's Foreign Ministry summoned, here Friday, Iranian Chargé d'Affaires in Rabat after the Revolutionary Guards' outlet of Fars News published a "defamatory" article against Morocco.		Hassan Rouhani	Mohammed VI of Morocco	
October 1, 2016			Morocco restored its diplomatic relations with Iran, Jun 24, 2017 - Morocco restored its diplomatic relations with Iran last October, after more than six years of severed ties due to Iran's conflict with Bahrain. Morocco's decision to send food aid to Qatar, which came only days after the king offered to mediate between the parties, demonstrates that the country has learned its lesson from its hasty 2009 decision to sever relations with Iran because of Bahrain.		Hassan Rouhani	Mohammed VI of Morocco	
December 14, 2016	Hassan Hami as Ambassador to Iran		The same day, Morocco's Ambassador to Iran, Hassan Hami, departed the country and returned to Morocco.		Hassan Rouhani	Mohammed VI of Morocco	May 1, 2018
May 1, 2018			Chargé d'affaires, Morocco's foreign ministry said on Tuesday it will close its embassy in Tehran and expel the Iranian ambassador in Rabat over Iran's support for Polisario. Morocco's expulsion of Iranian Charge d’Affairs.According to some Arab media, Bourita also demanded that Iran Chargé d'affaires Mohammad Taqi Moayed leave Morocco.		Hassan Rouhani	Mohammed VI of Morocco	
