= Unseen Hand =

2009 poetry collection by Adam Zagajewski

- First edition
- Author: Adam Zagajewski
- Original title: Niewidzialna ręka
- Translator: Clare Cavanagh
- Language: Polish
- Publisher: Znak
- Publication date: 2009
- Publication place: Poland
- English publication date: 2011
- Pages: 98
- ISBN: 978-83-240-1246-6

Unseen Hand (Polish: Niewidzialna ręka) is a 2009 poetry collection by the Polish writer Adam Zagajewski. It was published in English in 2011 through Farrar, Straus and Giroux.

== Reception ==
Stephan Delbos of The Prague Post wrote: "Unseen Hand shows the poet in a more mature state of mind than much of his earlier work, less of a political reactionary and more a settled poet musing on deep matters of the mind and heart. ... Despite the developments age and experience have brought to Zagajewski's poetry, the essential elements of his work remain the same, as do Zagajewski's favorite words: joy, praise, nettles, exile - all can be found on the pages of Unseen Hand. But here, Zagajewski's approach to these themes is more subtle than in earlier collections." Delbos ended the review: "Zagajewski is a master. Unseen Hand offers evidence of a deepening of his already-impressive gifts and a welcomed ability to live in moments of uncertainty. Let us hope his poems will continue to guide readers through their own moments of uncertainty for many books to come."

== See also ==
- 2009 in poetry
- Polish literature
