= Ratanlal Kishorilal Malviya =

Indian politician and labor leader

Member of Parliament, Rajya Sabha
- In office 1954–1966
- Constituency: Madhya Pradesh

Personal details
- Born: 11 August 1907
- Died: 1984
- Party: Indian National Congress

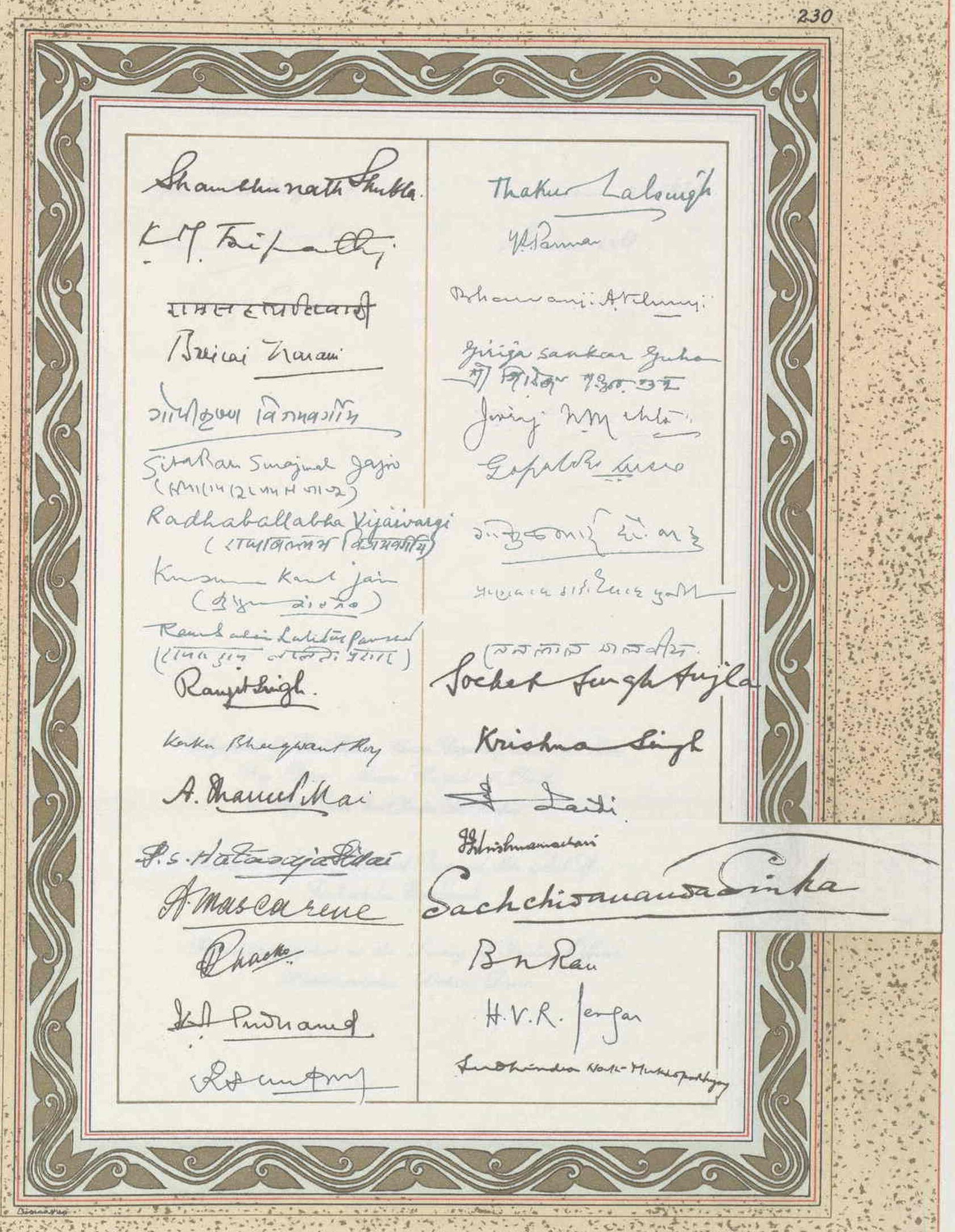
Malviya's signature in the Constitution of India manuscript, middle of II column, in Hindi

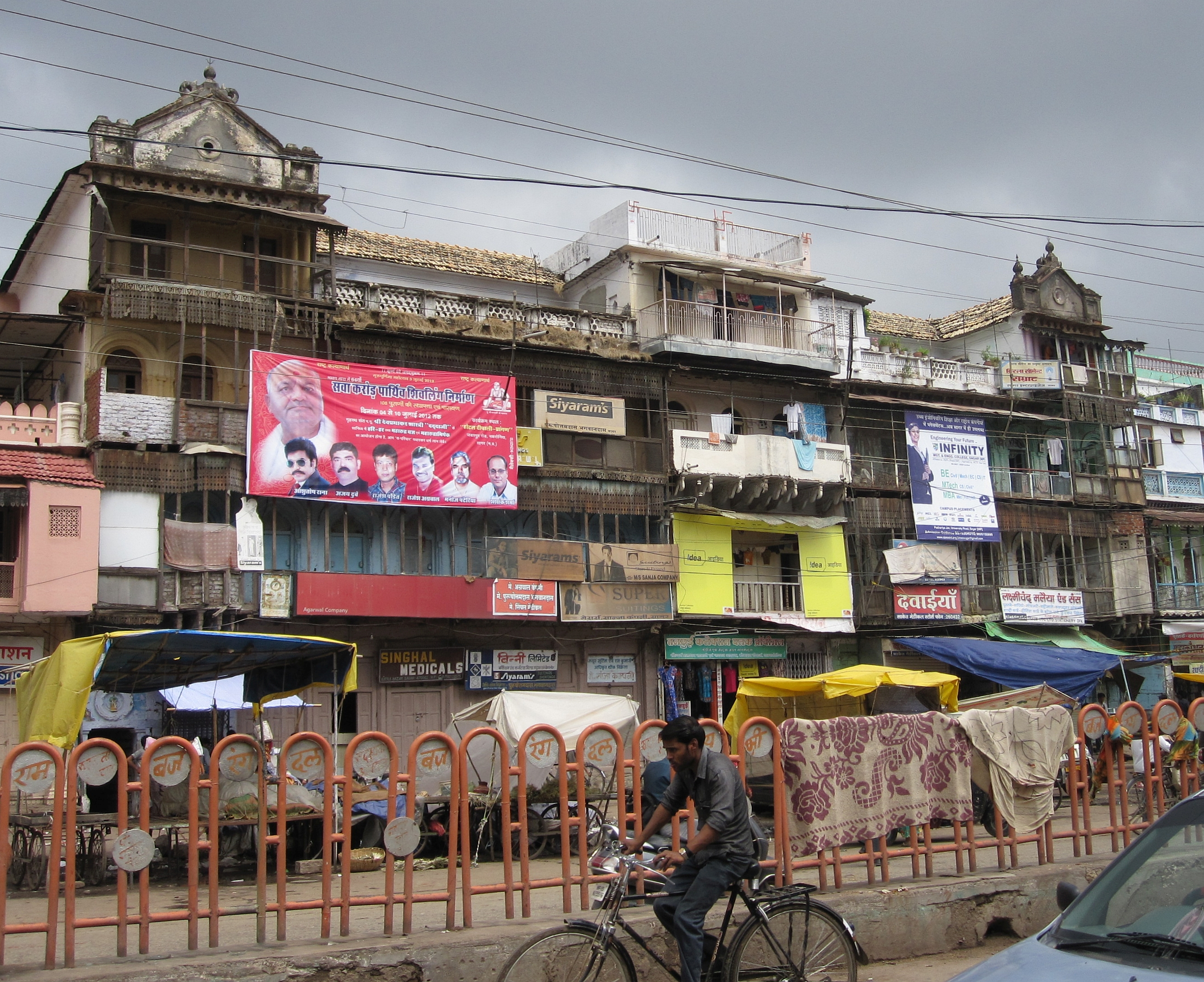
Four-story building constructed by Malaiya Pyarelal, Kishorilal, Mulchand and Bros. in 1910

Ratanlal Kishorilal Malviya (1907–1984) was an Indian labor leader, politician and a contributor to the Constitution of India.

His father Kishorilal Malaiya of Sagar, Madhya Pradesh belonged to the Malaiya family of Sagar, which had been a supporter and follower of Kshullak Ganeshprasad Varni, who founded several education institutions in the Bundelkhand region. He obtained his school education at Sagar, and was admitted in the law program at BHU and Allahabad University in 1925 and 1926. He served on the editorial department of the Chand magazine and also published articles in Sarasvati magazine.

He later started practicing law at Sagar and became the secretary of the Harijan Sevak Sangh founded by Mahatma Gandhi.

He became a member of the Constituent Assembly in 1948 which drafted the constitution of India and one of the signers of the constitution in 1950. He was a Member of Parliament representing Madhya Pradesh in the Rajya Sabha the upper house of India's Parliament as member of the Indian National Congress.

He served in the cabinet of Jawaharlal Nehru and Lal Bahadur Shastri during 1962–1966. He served on the Labour Commission of India and the International Labour Organization. He served on the Niyogi Committee On Christian Missionary Activities appointed by the Congress Government of Madhya Pradesh in 1956.

In Chirmiri, where he served as a labour leader, a locality is named Malviya nagar after him.
