= Middle-out economics =

Economic theory

Middle-out economics is a branch of demand-side macroeconomic theory. It identifies the buying power of the middle class as the necessary ingredient for job creation and economic growth. With consumption typically responsible for two-thirds of the gross domestic product in the Americas consumer spending is key. Middle-out economics maintains it is only the middle class that can create the aggregate demand necessary for business to support full employment levels. Given the wealthy's high propensity to save, middle-out economics holds that large concentrations of wealth are not sufficient cause for job creation. Middle-out economics maintains companies don't hire when they have an abundance of profits; they hire when they have an abundance of customers.

The middle-out economic framework is rooted in the scientific fact that economies are complex, adaptive, and ecosystemic. Economies are characterized by the same ‘circle of life’ like feedback loops found in natural ecosystems. Middle-out economics claims a fundamental law of capitalism must be “if workers have no money then businesses have no customers”. In this sense, it claims that the true “job creators” in a capitalistic economy are customers and not rich business people. It maintains that a thriving middle class is the cause of growth and not the consequence of it. Therefore, the only way to prosperity is from the middle-out.

Middle-out economics favors governmental policies that help to ensure the buying power of the middle class.

Middle-out economics is held in opposition to Reaganomics, sometimes referred to as trickle-down economics.

The term middle-out economics was coined by Eric Liu, a former speechwriter for Bill Clinton, and Nick Hanauer, a venture capitalist.
