= Another Beauty =

1998 memoir by Adam Zagajewski

- Author: Adam Zagajewski
- Original title: W cudzym pięknie
- Translator: Clare Cavanagh
- Language: Polish
- Publisher: Wydawnictwo Literackie
- Publication date: 1998
- Publication place: Poland
- English publication date: 2000
- Pages: 212
- ISBN: 83-85568-37-9

Another Beauty (Polish: W cudzym pięknie) is a 1998 memoir by the Polish poet Adam Zagajewski. It focuses on Zagajewski's student years and early time as a poet in Kraków in the 1960s and 1970s, and his involvement with the artist group "Now", leaving aestheticism behind to focus on contemporary politics and clash with communist authorities.

== See also ==
- 1998 in literature
- Polish literature
