= François Delpla =

French historian

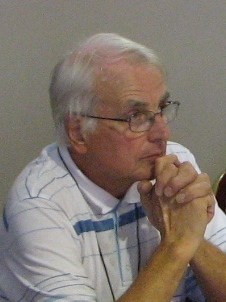
François Delpla

François Delpla (born 1948) is a French historian. He is a specialist in the history of World War II and the French Resistance. He was one of the contributors to the Black Book of Capitalism.

He received a doctorate in 2002 from the Université Panthéon-Sorbonne (Paris) for a thesis "Décision et décideurs français et britanniques de la chute de Daladier aux lendemains de Montoire (mars-novembre 1940)" under the direction of Jean-Claude Allain

== Books ==
=== History ===
- Les Papiers secrets du général Doumenc (1939-1940), Olivier Orban, Paris, 1991, 526 p.
- Montoire – Les premiers jours de la collaboration, Albin Michel, Paris, 1996, 504 p. (ISBN 2-226-08488-6 et 978–2226084880)

review, Vingtième Siècle. Revue d'histoire, n52 (19961001): 160
review, Guerres mondiales et conflits contemporains, n220 (20051001): 141-147

- La Ruse nazie – Dunkerque - 24 mai 1940, Éditions France Empire, 1997, 310 p. (ISBN 2-7048-0814-7 et 978–2704808144)
- Aubrac – Les faits et la calomnie, Le Temps des Cerises, 1998, 171 p. (ISBN 2841091139 et 978–2841091133).
- Hitler, Grasset, Paris, 1999, 541 p. (ISBN 2246570417 et 978–2246570417).
- L'Appel du 18 Juin 1940, Grasset, Paris, 2000, 314 p. (ISBN 2-246-59931-8 et 978–2246599319).
- La Face cachée de 1940 – Comment Churchill réussit à prolonger la partie, Éditions François-Xavier de Guibert, coll. « Histoire », 2003, 191 p. (ISBN 2868398413 et 978–2868398413) [
- (with Jacques Baumel), La Libération de la France, L'Archipel, Paris, 2004, 192 p. (ISBN 2-84187-421-4 et 978–2841874217) [
- Les Tentatrices du diable – Hitler, la part des femmes, L'Archipel, Paris, 2005, 361 p. (ISBN 2-84187-683-7 et 978–2841876839) [
- Nuremberg face à l'histoire, L'Archipel, Paris, 2006, 350 p. (ISBN 2-84187-781-7 et 978–2841877812)
- (with Jacques Baumelel), Un Tragique Malentendu : de Gaulle et l'Algérie, Plon, Paris, 2006, 250 p. (ISBN 2-259-20412-0 et 978–2259204125)

review, Esprit (1940-) n330 (12) (20061201): 221

- Qui a tué Georges Mandel ? (1885-1944), L'Archipel, Paris, 2008, 427 p. (ISBN 2809800758 et 978-2-8098-0075-3).
- Petit Dictionnaire énervé de la Seconde Guerre mondiale, collection « Petit dictionnaire énervé », L'Opportun, Paris, 2010, 217 p. (ISBN 2360750054 et 978–2360750054).
- Mers el-Kébir, 3 juillet 1940 : l'Angleterre rentre en guerre Paris : Guibert, 2010.
- Hitler – 30 janvier 1933 – La Véritable Histoire, Saint-Malo, Éditions Pascal Galodé, 2013, 224 p. (ISBN 978-2355932496). U
- Une histoire du Troisième Reich, Éditions Perrin, 2014, 450 p. (ISBN 978-2262036423).
- Hitler – Propos intimes et politiques (1941-1942), tome I, Nouveau Monde Éditions, 2016.
