= Thylias Moss =

American poet

Thylias Moss (born February 27, 1954, in Cleveland, Ohio) is an American poet, writer, experimental filmmaker, sound artist and playwright of African-American, Native American, and European heritage. Her poetry has been published in a number of collections and anthologies, and she has also published essays, children's books, and plays. She is the pioneer of Limited Fork Theory, a literary theory concerned with the limitations and capacity of human understanding of art.

== Youth ==
Moss was born Thylias Rebecca Brasier, in a working-class family in Ohio. Her father chose the name Thylias because he decided she needed a name that had not existed before. According to Moss, her first few years of life were happy, living with her family in the upstairs rooms of an older Jewish couple named Feldman (who Moss believes were Holocaust survivors). The Feldmans treated Moss like a grandchild.

When Moss was five, the Feldmans sold their house and moved away. Her parents continued to live in the house with the new homeowners and their 13-year-old daughter, Lytta, who began to baby-sit Moss after school. Moss experienced constant harassment from Lytta and several traumatic events before the age of nine. She later said about her trauma: "I never said a word of this to anybody....I was there witnessing things that only happened when I left that house."

At age nine her family relocated, causing her to be sent to school in a predominantly white district. After enduring bullying and racism from both her peers and teachers, she withdrew from social interaction at school and did not speak freely in classes until many years later in college. It was during this time she gave more attention to writing poetry, an activity she had begun two years earlier.

== Adult years ==
Moss married at age 16 before attending Syracuse University from 1971 to 1973. She eventually left university due to racial tensions and entered the workforce for several years. During this time she had two sons, Dennis and Ansted. She enrolled in Oberlin College in 1979 and graduated with a BA in 1981. She later received a Master of Arts in English, with an emphasis on writing, from the University of New Hampshire.

After finishing school, Moss taught English at Phillips Academy in Andover, Massachusetts. Since 1993, she has been a Professor of English and a Professor of Art and Design at the University of Michigan in Ann Arbor, Michigan.

Her early work is considered part of the legacy of the Black Arts Movement, taking influence from West African praise poetry and concerning themes of racial justice. Throughout her career, her work has become more experimental, stretching the boundaries of genre and the definition of poetry. Her fixations still include justice, but she expanded into a fascination with text placement's effect on meaning. These experiments with form culminated in her development of Limited Fork Theory and the invention of the POAM (product of act of making). Moss's POAMs are combinations of film and poetry, emphasizing how text placement and movement, among other sensory elements, can enhance the meaning of a poem.

== Limited Fork Theory ==
Moss contributed to experimental literary theory by introducing the metaphor of a fork to conceptualize how people internalize art and literature. The fork as a metaphor for understanding represents bifurcation, and Moss argues that the branching out of the mind to understand art mimics the branching tines of a fork. She uses the word "limited" to express that, though an observer gains understanding of art through these bifurcated systems of comprehension, the same systems limit their understanding. Just as one can only eat that which adheres to the tines of a fork, one can only internalize the facets of a piece of art that adhere to these bifurcated tines of understanding.

The development of Moss's POAMs (products of acts of making) coincided with her theoretical development of Limited Fork. These multimedia pieces use as many sensory elements as possible, including movement, color, and sound. Moss has also expressed interest in incorporating olfactory elements in future projects. These POAMS are usually displayed in galleries, but many can be found online in podcasts, journals, and on YouTube.

The complexities associated with the epistemological application of Limited Fork Theory caused Moss to adopt the persona of Forker Girl/Forker Gryle, pseudonyms under which she runs blogs and an Instagram account explaining details of both her life and her theory.

== Work and awards ==
Poetry

- Wannabe Hoochie Mama Gallery of Realities' Red Dress Code: New & Selected Poems (Persea Books, 2016)
- Tokyo Butter: Poems (Persea Books, 2006)
- Slave Moth: A Narrative in Verse (Persea Books, 2004)
- Last Chance for the Tarzan Holler (1998)
- Small Congregations: New and Selected Poems (1993), included by critic Harold Bloom in his list of works constituting the Western Canon of literature.
- Rainbow Remnants in Rock Bottom Ghetto Sky (1991)
- At Redbones (1990)
- Pyramid of Bone (1989)
- Hosiery Seams on a Bowlegged Woman (1983)

Prose

- New Kiss Horizon (2017), a romance.
- Tale of a Sky-Blue Dress (1998), a memoir.
- Talking to Myself (1984), a play.
- The Dolls in the Basement (1984), a play.
- I Want To Be (Dial Books for Young Readers, 1995)

Awards

- MacArthur Fellowship (1996)
- Guggenheim Fellowship (1995)
- Dewar's Profiles Performance Award (1991)
- Whiting Award (1991)
- Witter Bynner Poetry Prize (1991)
- Artist's Fellowship from the Massachusetts Arts Council (1987)
- NEA grant
