= Judy Waite =

English writer and illustrator

Judy Waite is an author of picture books for young children and novels for young adults, as well as poetry and short stories. Her books have won several awards, including the English Association Best Children's Picture Book (1998) for Mouse, Look Out and Children's Book Federation for Laura's Star.

Waite currently teaches Creative Writing at the University of Winchester.

== Biography ==
Ms. Waite grew up in Fareham, Hampshire and in Singapore. She studied at Art College and then taught art to children. As of 2007, she lived in Southampton, England, and teaches creative writing in Winchester University.

== List of works ==
=== Picture books ===
- Look Out the Window
- Digging for Dinosaurs
- I Wish I Had a Monster
- Fox Beware
- Mouse, Look Out! (award-winning)
- The Storm Seal
- The Stray Kitten

=== Children's books ===
- Robbie in The River
- Animal Heroes
- Pet Rescue
- Eerie Encounters
- A Prince Among Donkeys
- Tiger Hunt
- A Mammoth Mistake
- Foul Play
- The Singing Princess
- Deep Water
- Star Striker
- Cheat

=== Young adult books ===
- Forbidden
- Shopaholic
- Shadow
- Trick of the Mind
- Game Girls
- Twisting the Truth
