= Tale of a Sky-Blue Dress =

1998 book by Thylias Moss

- First edition
- Author: Thylias Moss
- Language: English
- Subject: Memoir
- Published: 1998 (Bard Press)
- Publication place: United States
- Media type: Print (hardback)
- Pages: 274
- ISBN: 9780380793624
- OCLC: 42333832

Tale of a Sky-Blue Dress is a 1998 memoir by Thylias Moss. It is the story of Moss' life from early childhood, including at the hands of an abusive babysitter, an older girl in a blue dress, through to her marriage.

== Reception ==
Booklist, in a review of Tale of a Sky-Blue Dress, wrote "This haunting memoir is also a delicate and thorough exploration of the nature of evil and the place of cruelty both in the author's own life and more broadly within the human experience."

CNN wrote "Tale of a Sky-Blue Dress starts promisingly, thanks to poet Thylias Moss' shining description of an idyllic childhood." and concluded "In her final chapters, Moss exults in her ability to love and be loved. Her happiness is evident, but hardly eloquent. Perhaps she wrote the book to prove she survived. She also proves that what works in life doesn't necessarily succeed as writing." It has also been called "a remarkably frank memoir."

Tale of a Sky-Blue Dress has also been reviewed by Kirkus Reviews, Publishers Weekly, Multicultural Review and The New York Times.
