= I Want to Be =

1993 picture book by Thylias Moss

- Author: Thylias Moss
- Illustrator: Jerry Pinkney
- Language: English
- Genre: Children's literature, Poetry
- Published: 1993 (Dial Books for Young Readers)
- Publication place: USA
- Media type: Print (hardback, paperback)
- Pages: 32 (unpaginated)
- ISBN: 9780803712867
- OCLC: 26552997

I Want to Be is a 1993 picture book by Thylias Moss and illustrated by Jerry Pinkney. It is about a girl who is asked what she wants to be and the imaginative answers she gives.

== Reception ==
A review of I Want to Be by Booklist, wrote "The ambitious text at times goes over the top and becomes pretentious in its imagery, but there is much here with which children can identify. All the pulling and pushing of life comes out in Moss' lilting writing, feelings that kids know all too well.", and recommended its use as "a starting point for discussion to get kids talking about what they would like to be."

I Want to Be has also been reviewed by Horn Book Guide, Kirkus Reviews, and Publishers Weekly.

It is a 1993 CCBC Choice and a 1997 NCTE Kaleidoscope book.
