= La Roquille =

- Commune
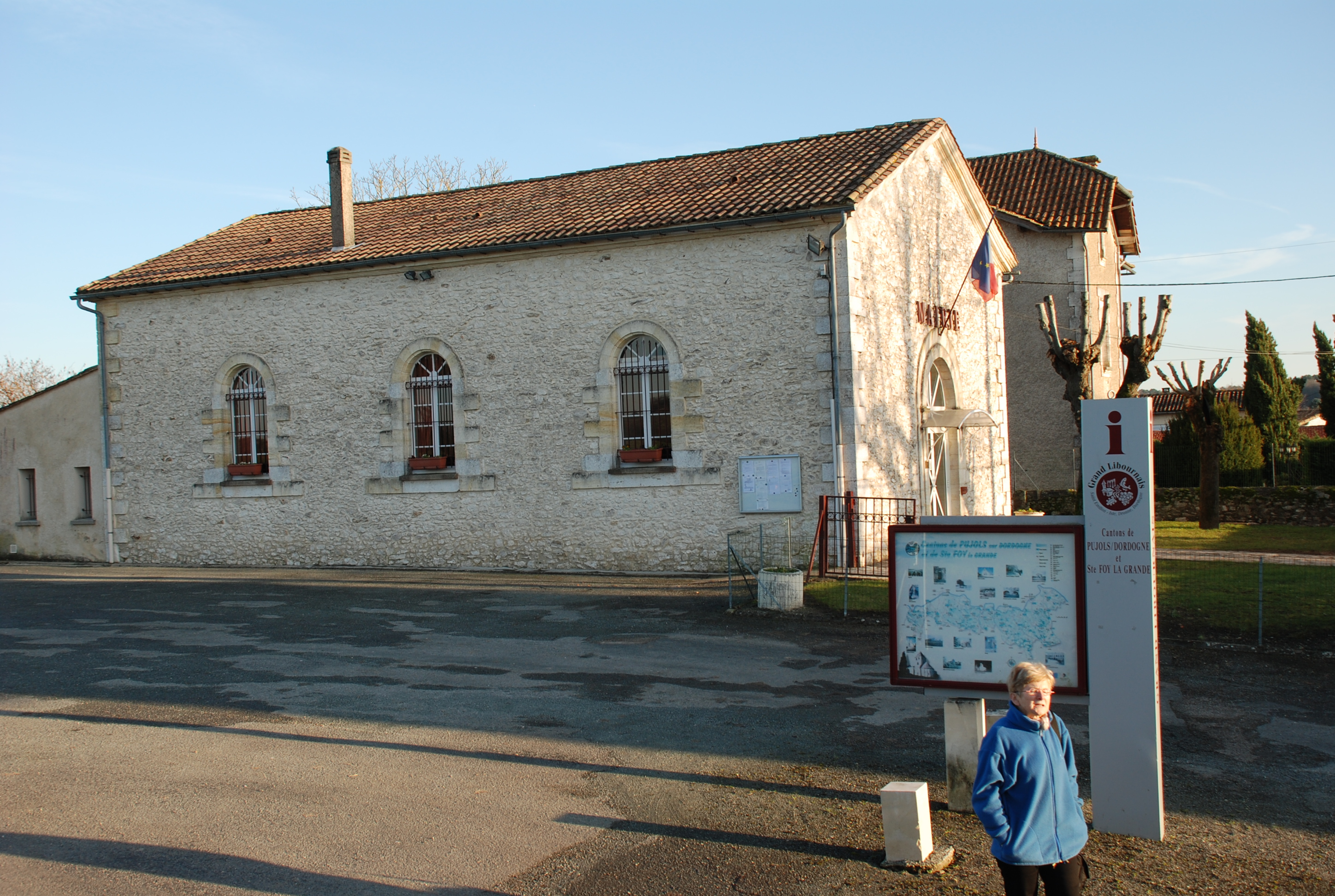
- Town hall
- Location of La Roquille
- Location within France Location within Nouvelle-Aquitaine
- Coordinates: 44°47′31″N 0°13′56″E
- Country: France
- Region: Nouvelle-Aquitaine
- Department: Gironde
- Arrondissement: Libourne
- Canton: Le Réolais et Les Bastides
- Intercommunality: Pays Foyen

Government
  - Mayor (2020–2026): David Ulmann
- Area^{1}: 3.38 km^{2} (1.31 sq mi)
- Elevation: 88 m (289 ft)
- Highest elevation: 125 m (410 ft)
- Lowest elevation: 62 m (203 ft)
- Population (2023): 316
  - Density: 93.5/km^{2} (242/sq mi)
- Time zone: UTC+01:00 (CET)
  - Summer (DST): UTC+02:00 (CEST)
- INSEE/Postal code: 33360 /33220
- ^{1} French Land Register data, which excludes lakes, ponds, glaciers > 1 km^{2} (0.386 sq mi or 247 acres) and river estuaries.

La Roquille (French pronunciation: [la ʁɔkij]; Occitan: La Roquilha) is a commune in the Gironde department in Nouvelle-Aquitaine in southwestern France. It is located on the D708 route between Sainte-Foy-la-Grande and Margueron.

== Population ==
Historical population
Year	Pop.	±% p.a.
1968	289	—
1975	264	−1.28%
1982	218	−2.70%
1990	335	+5.52%
1999	312	−0.79%
2007	299	−0.53%
2012	317	+1.18%
2017	328	+0.68%
2023	316	−0.62%
Source: INSEE

== See also ==
- Communes of the Gironde department
