= The Accidental Asian =

The Accidental Asian: Notes of a Native Speaker
- Paperback edition cover, 1999
- Author: Eric Liu
- Cover artist: Jon Chase
- Language: English
- Subject: Biography
- Publisher: Random House
- Publication date: 1998
- Publication place: United States
- Media type: Hardcover
- Pages: 206 pp.
- ISBN: 978-0-679-44862-4
- OCLC: 38048676
- LC Class: E184.C5L62 1998

The Accidental Asian: Notes of a Native Speaker is a collection of memoirs and essays by American writer Eric Liu published in 1998. One of his arguments criticizes the unified Asian American movement with uniform interests. The book was well received by major reviewers, including The New York Times Book Review and Time magazine.

== Essays ==
The Accidental Asian is a collection of seven essays and short memoirs by Liu. In the first chapter, "Song for My Father", the author recounts the story of his father's death and a memory book compiled by family and friends for the funeral. However, much of the book's content remains unknown to him as he is not able to read the Chinese text. He laments the inability to read Chinese despite being able to speak the language in the next chapter, "Notes of a Native Speaker". The discussion on family also involves a memoir of his paternal grandmother in the final chapter, "Blood Vows". In "The Chinatown Idea", Liu writes about a short history of the New York City Chinatown. The titular chapter, "The Accidental Asian", criticized the idea of a unified Asian American movement with uniform interests. Liu argues against a monolithic community citing statistical evidence that more than half of Asian Americans under 34 years old are married to non-Asians. He also argues that Asians have taken the place of the Jews as the new "model minority" in "The New Jews". International topics are also covered in "Fear of a Yellow Planet", including the 1996 United States campaign finance controversy which involved individuals of Chinese descent who contributed to President Bill Clinton's re-election campaign.

== Reviews ==
Liu's book was generally well received by book reviewers. Writing for The New York Times Book Review, writer Gary Krist praised The Accidental Asian because it is "enriched by elements beyond polemics", and Liu's work "covers a lot of territory without succumbing to glibness". Romesh Ratnesar, in a review for Time magazine, praised Liu's balanced approach toward racial topics. In the process, he "sacrifices depth for breadth", as exemplified in his discussion on the links between Chinese and Jewish cultures. This approach also caused Ratnesar to be somewhat disappointed at Liu's broad treatment of affirmative action topics.

== Bibliography ==
- Liu, Eric (1998). The Accidental Asian: Notes of a Native Speaker (Hardcover). New York, N.Y.: Random House. ISBN 978-0-679-44862-4.
- Liu, Eric (1999). The Accidental Asian: Notes of a Native Speaker (Paperback). New York, N.Y.: Vintage Books. ISBN 978-0-375-70486-4.
- Liu, Eric (1999). 偶然生為亞裔人: 一位ABC的成長心路 [Ǒurán Shēng Wéi Yàyì Rén: Yī Wèi ABC de Chéngzhǎng Xīnlù] (in Chinese). Taipei: Commonwealth Publishing. ISBN 978-957-621-613-8.
