= Mouse, Look Out! =

1998 picture book by Judy Waite

- Author: Judy Waite
- Illustrator: Norma Burgin
- Language: English
- Genre: Children's picture book
- Published: 1998 (Magi)
- Publication place: England
- Media type: Print (hardcover)
- Pages: 24
- ISBN: 9781854304667
- OCLC: 45337635

Mouse, Look Out! is a 1998 children's picture book by Judy Waite and Norma Burgin. It is about a mouse being stalked by a cat.

== Plot summary ==
In an isolated, abandoned cottage with "Danger Keep Out" on the wall, a brown mouse scampers around, at first unaware of being watched and followed by a stealthy black cat. The cat is also being watched, however, and is at last startled into running away.

== Reception ==
Booklist wrote "Prereaders can easily grasp the plot just by looking at the wonderfully detailed pictures, but this entertaining, interactive story begs to be read aloud." and the School Library Journal wrote "Beautiful artwork with some double-page spreads show a spooky English cottage filled with interesting junk. Young audiences will never tire of finding the cat in each picture and joining in the refrain, "MOUSE, LOOK OUT!/THERE'S A CAT ABOUT.""

Kirkus Reviews described it as "A tale of mild suspense." and "Waite's story is sweet but negligible; what will keep readers flipping the pages is Burgin's tour of the deserted house--the artwork naturalistic and detailed--and the menacing cat lurking in the shadows, all stealth and determination." Publishers Weekly found it a "taut tale" and the English Association called it "a perfect partnership of text and illustration." It has also been review by Reading Time and the Teacher Magazine.

== Awards and nominations ==
1998 Nevada Young Readers' Award - winner
1999 English 4-11 Book Awards Key Stage 1 Fiction - winner
2000 Florida Reading Association Children's Book Award - winner
