= Tadeusz Zagajewski =

Polish electronic engineer

Tadeusz Zagajewski (16 December 1912, in Lwów – 28 September 2010) was a Polish electronic engineer, professor (since 1954) and honoris causa of Silesian University of Technology. He was a member of the Polish Academy of Sciences (corresponding member since 1960; full member since 1976), and honorable member of Polish Society of Theoretical and Applied Electrical Engineering. He is the author of works mainly about electrical network theory.
