= Ralph Lombreglia =

American short story writer and multimedia producer and consultant

Ralph Lombreglia (born 1951) is an American short story writer and multimedia producer and consultant. He wrote several short stories including two collections: Men Under Water and Make Me Work. He was a 1998 recipient of the Whiting Award. He teaches at the Massachusetts Institute of Technology.

== Bibliography ==
=== Short fiction ===
Collections

- Men under water : short stories. New York: Washington Square Press. 1990.
- Make me work. New York: Farrar, Straus, Giroux. 1994.

=== Book reviews ===
Year	Review article	Work(s) reviewed
1996	"The only people for him". Books. The Atlantic Monthly. 278 (2): 88–93. August 1996.	Charters, Ann, ed. (1995). The portable Jack Kerouac. New York: Viking. ISBN 9780670849574.; Charters, Ann, ed. (1995). Jack Kerouac : selected letters, 1940–1956. New York: Viking. ISBN 9780670849574.
