= Gilles Perrault =

French writer and journalist (1931–2023)

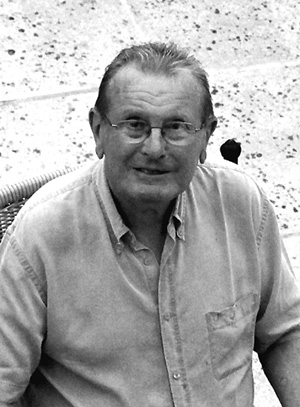
Gilles Perrault in 2015

Jacques Peyroles (9 March 1931 – 3 August 2023), better known by his pen name Gilles Perrault, was a French writer and journalist.

== Biography ==
Born Jacques Peyroles in Paris, Perrault attended the Collège Stanislas de Paris and then studied at the Institut d'études politiques, eventually becoming a lawyer, a profession he worked in for five years.

After the success of his essay Les parachutistes (1961), inspired by his military service in Algeria, he became a journalist and wrote articles about Nehru's India, the 1964 Summer Olympics in Tokyo and the problems of African Americans in the United States. He then investigated less well-known aspects of World War II.

From 1961 he lived in Sainte-Marie-du-Mont, Manche, upon which he wrote the book Les gens d'ici ("People from here").

Le Secret du jour J (1964) (Secrets of D-Day, 1974) won a prize from the Comité d'action de la Résistance and was an international bestseller. L'Orchestre rouge (1967) was even more successful. In 1969, Perrault published a spy novel, Le dossier 51.

In 1978, Perrault published Le Pull-over rouge, a novel in which he criticized the method of investigation done by the French police around the 1974 death of an eight-year-old girl. Christian Ranucci, a French man, was executed by guillotine for the murder on 28 July 1976. Perrault's case, calling Ranucci's guilt into question, held a great influence in the debate upon capital punishment in France. It has reportedly had a notable impact upon a part of public opinion, having sold over 1 million copies. Perrault was condemned twice, however, for his claims and papers about this case: in 1989 for having talked in a TV program of "abuse of authority" about the policemen in charge of the investigation (fined 30,000 francs to each person defamed at first instance, 40,000 on appeal in 1990, then 70,000 francs to each of the five plaintiffs on cassation in 1992, as well as the presenter); and in 2008 he and his publisher Fayard were found guilty of defamation toward the Marseille police in the book L'ombre de Christian Ranucci (fined 5,000 euros and his editor an equal sum, a decision confirmed on appeal in 2009 and granted 10,000 euros in damages to each of the four policemen defamed).

In 1980, he created the TV series Julien Fontanes, magistrat with Jean Cosmos.

In 1990, Perrault published Notre ami le roi (Our Friend the King, 1993) about the regime and human rights abuses of Hassan II, at the time king of Morocco, who had until then been reported positively because of his close relations with the Western world. Perrault's book Le Garçon aux yeux gris (2001) was adapted by André Téchiné for the film Les Égarés.

From 1992 to 1996, Perrault published a very comprehensive and abundantly documented essay in three tomes titled Le Secret du Roi, about Louis XV secret services. First tome, La Passion polonaise, is centered on continental eastern policy and the then elective kingdom of Poland, second tome, L'ombre de la Bastille, is about the loss of French colonies of Canada and India to the British government, while third tome La Revanche américaine centers on French assistance to the Americans insurgents (Benjamin Franklin and George Washington). The book highlits the role of Pierre Augustin Caron de Beaumarchais, the well known theatre author, as an arms dealer, secret agent and shipowner, running war supplies to the Insurgents.

Gilles Perrault died from heart attack on 3 August 2023, at the age of 92.

== Bibliography ==
- Les parachutistes, 1961
- Le Secret du Jour J, 1964 (English translation: Secrets of D-Day, Arthur Barker, 1965, and Little, Brown and Company, 1965)
- L'orchestre rouge, 1967
- Le dossier 51, 1969
- Le Pull-over rouge, 1978 (ISBN 2-253-02543-7)
- Les gens d'ici, 1981
- Un homme à part, 1984 (A Man Apart: the Life of Henri Curiel, 1987 ISBN 0-86232-660-5 (pbk.) : ISBN 0862326591)
- Paris under the occupation, Gilles Perrault, Jean-Pierre Azéma, Deutsch, 1989, ISBN 978-0-233-98511-4
- Notre ami le roi, 1990 (Our Friend the King, 1993 ISBN 2-07-032695-0)
- Le Secret du Roi (1992-1996)
  - La Passion polonaise, 1992
  - L'Ombre de la Bastille, 1993
  - La Revanche américaine, 1996
- Les jardins de l'Observatoire, 1995
- Le Livre noir du capitalisme, 1998
- Le garçon aux yeux gris, 2001
- Go!, 2002
- L'ombre de Christian Ranucci, 2006
- Checkpoint Charlie, 2008
- Dictionnaire amoureux de la Résistance, 2014
- Grand-père, 2016
