= Notre ami le roi =

1990 book by Gilles Perrault

Our Friend the King
- Author: Gilles Perrault
- Original title: Notre ami le roi
- Language: French
- Publisher: Éditions Gallimard
- Publication date: 12 September 1990; 10 April 1992 (renewed edition)
- Publication place: France
- English publication date: 1993
- Media type: Print (hardback and paperback)
- Pages: 367 (1990); 384 (1992)
- ISBN: 9782070719815
- Dewey Decimal: 964.05092
- LC Class: DT325.7 .P47 1990

Notre ami le roi (Our Friend the King) is a book written by Gilles Perrault in 1990. Its subject is King Hassan II of Morocco. Perrault's stated goal was to show that the modern, democratic facade of Morocco hid a brutal dictatorship. Notre ami le roi is not a biography.

== Reception ==
Notre Ami le Roi caused a scandal in France. At its appearance King Hassan II demanded that it be banned - without success, although in similar cases the French government had shown itself open to the wishes of friendly leaders. Perrault addressed a French readership. "Our friend" means a friend of France.

He notes few sources, and no bibliography or references are included. Perrault shows his expertise, his analytical skills and his commitment to the oppressed.

== Content ==
The focus of the book is the representation of the Moroccan power system, especially the political repression and power struggles within the elite.

=== Outline of Moroccan history ===
Perrault begins with an outline of Moroccan history, colonial times and the liberation struggle. He describes the background of the conflict over Western Sahara, the power of French banks and corporations in Morocco, the development of the opposition and the uprisings of the impoverished urban population.

In 1990 Hassan II confessed to an Amnesty International delegation, "Every head of state, has its secret gardens".

=== Political prisoners ===
Perrault investigates the fate of individual political prisoners that could be reconstructed from source material.

==== Oufkir family ====
For example, the Oufkir family was imprisoned for 18 years solely for its relationship with General Mohamed Oufkir. Until 1972 Oufkir was the strongman of the regime. He shot himself with four bullets, according to official Moroccan statements, after his participation in a coup attempt against Hassan II.

==== Abraham Serfaty ====
Abraham Serfaty was a Communist of Jewish descent and one of the few who questioned the Moroccan claim to Western Sahara.

=== Bourgeois juridical system / pharaonic power ===
Perrault demonstrates the character, mode of action, and goals of the repressive system. In Morocco, "two regimes coexist, as opposite as day and night" Thus there exists a "juridical system organized according to the norms of bourgeois democracy", besides "a pharaonic power".

== The New York Times Book Review ==
On Nov. 11, 1990. Steven Greenhouse wrote in The New York Times: Book on Morocco's King Strains French Ties

Government of France's normally close relations with Moroccan government have soured over the book, that accuses Hassan II of Morocco of systematic human rights violations.

Moroccan officials assert that the Government of France has helped organize a defamation campaign against Hassan II of Morocco because the writer of the book has been interviewed several times on France Télévisions and radio stations.

French officials declared they were merely allowing the broadcasters to exercise freedom of the press.

"Our Friend the King," by Gilles Perrault, is a biography of Hassan II of Morocco and examines cases of torture, killing and political imprisonment said to have been carried out by the Moroccan Government.

Moroccan officials have threatened to end their cooperation agreements with France over this matter, and the French Foreign Minister, Roland Dumas, scheduled a hasty trip to Rabat to meet with Hassan II of Morocco on November 9, 1990, to mend relations.

Morocco's Prime Minister, Azzeddine Laraki, wrote a letter to his French counterpart, Michel Rocard, to denounce a "campaign of denigration" against his Government. Azzeddine Laraki alluded to an interview that state-owned Radio France Internationale.

Mr. Rocard replied that his Government could not restrain the press and broadcasting because French governments "have been committed to a policy of giving complete independenceto radio and television broadcasters."

According to Maghreb Arabe Press, 200,000 Moroccans sent messages to France to protest French reports criticizing the King.

In a speech, Hassan II of Morocco said: "More or less, they've accused me of being crazy. If that's true, all Moroccans must be crazy."

== Danielle Mitterrand Canceled Trip ==
On October 30, 1990 the Moroccan Government learned that Danielle Mitterrand, the wife of President François Mitterrand, was planning to visit a refugee camp in Tindouf, where the Polisario Front was based.

Danielle Mitterrand, who headed the Fondation Danielle-Mitterrand - France Libertés, a Paris-based human rights organization that helps refugees, canceled the trip after Moroccan officials protested and one Rabat newspaper wrote that her trip showed that she "clearly does not love Morocco." Moroccan officials said her trip would encourage the Polisario Front, who are fighting Morocco's claims over the Western Sahara, former Spanish Sahara that is rich in minerals.

On November 8, 1990, in Paris Danielle Mitterrand met with Khadija Bent Hamdi, the wife of Mohamed Abdelaziz (Sahrawi politician), causing one Moroccan paper to write that she was "throwing oil on the fire." After his meeting with Hassan II of Morocco on November 9, 1990, Foreign Minister Roland Dumas said that tensions had been reduced and that both sides reiterated their desire to maintain friendly relations.

== Buy up all the copies ==
On Sept. 11, 1990 the Moroccan Interior Minister, Driss Basri, met with the French Interior Minister, Pierre Joxe, to seek to prevent publication of Mr. Perrault's book. He even offered to buy up all the copies. Mr. Joxe rejected the request.

Mr. Perrault said his book "is not against Morocco as Hassan tries to make people believe," adding, "It is for the Moroccan people."
