= The Human Christ =

1998 book by Charlotte Allen

- Author: Charlotte Allen
- Publication date: 1998
- ISBN: 0-684-82725-5

The Human Christ: The Search For The Historical Jesus was written by Charlotte Allen and published in 1998. Charlotte Allen discusses how the perception of Christ has evolved throughout history, touching upon the time of Christ. The narrative goes on to document how the early Christians lived in strife with Jews and Pagans.

The book later leads to a demonstration of how Sir Isaac Newton changed society and caused a division in religious practice as science and logic ignited the minds of academics.
