= Eric Liu =

American journalist

- 劉柏川
- Liu in 2014

Deputy Assistant to the President for Domestic Policy
- In office 2000–2001
- President: Bill Clinton
- Preceded by: Elena Kagan
- Succeeded by: John Bridgeland

Personal details
- Born: 1968 (age 57–58) Poughkeepsie, New York, U.S.
- Relations: Liu Chao-shiuan (uncle)
- Education: Yale University (BA); Harvard University (JD)
- Occupation: Author; educator; strategist; journalist

Chinese name
- Traditional Chinese: 劉柏川
- Simplified Chinese: 刘柏川
- Hanyu Pinyin: Liú Bǎichuān

Eric P. Liu (Chinese: 劉柏川; born 1968) is an American lawyer and CEO and co-founder of Citizen University, a non-profit organization promoting civic empowerment. Liu served as Deputy Assistant to President Bill Clinton for Domestic Policy at the White House between 1999 and 2000. He served as Speechwriter and Director of Legislative Affairs for the National Security Council at the White House from 1993 to 1994.

President Barack Obama nominated him in January 2015 to serve on the board of directors of the federal Corporation for National and Community Service and he was confirmed by the U.S. Senate; his term expired in December 2017.

== Biography ==
Liu was born in Poughkeepsie, New York, to a Taiwanese American family. His parents were born in China and later moved to Taiwan. His uncle, Liu Chao-shiuan, served as the premier of the Republic of China.

After high school, Liu graduated from Yale University with a bachelor's degree in history and earned his Juris Doctor (J.D.) from Harvard Law School.

Liu lives in Seattle, where he has served on the Seattle Public Library Board of Trustees and on the Washington State Board of Education. He has taught civic leadership courses at the University of Washington and is the co-founder of the Alliance for Gun Responsibility.

== Social activism ==
Liu is CEO of Citizen University, a non-profit organization that promotes what it calls "powerful citizenship". Citizen University's programs include Civic Saturdays, a civic analogue to a faith gathering. His 2014 TED talk on civic power, "Why ordinary people need to understand power", has been viewed more than two million times. His other TED Talks, on civic religion and on voting, have also been viewed millions of times. In 2014, he launched the Aspen Institute Program on Citizenship and American Identity to advance conversation about the nature of American national identity.

== Literary career ==
Liu is the author of Become America: Civic Sermons on Love, Responsibility, and Democracy, which collects sermons he wrote and delivered at Civic Saturdays around the country. His 2017 book You're More Powerful Than You Think is a citizen's guide to the practice of power. His book A Chinaman's Chance (2014) explores being Chinese American in the age of China and America. He is also the author of Guiding Lights: The People Who Lead Us Toward Our Purpose in Life (2005), about transformative mentors, leaders and teachers, and The Accidental Asian: Notes of a Native Speaker (1998), about ethnicity, identity and acculturation. Liu is a frequent contributor to TheAtlantic.com. He wrote the "Teachings" column for Slate magazine from 2002 to 2005.

Liu and businessman Nick Hanauer have co-authored two political books: The True Patriot (Sasquatch Books, 2007), which defines patriotism in progressive terms, and The Gardens of Democracy (Sasquatch Books, 2011), which presents a 21st-century way of envisioning citizenship, the economy, and the role of government. In 2013, Liu and Hanauer suggested a demand-side macroeconomic theory, Middle-out economics, which identifies the buying power of the middle class as the necessary ingredient for job creation and economic growth.

Together with Danielle S. Allen and Stephen B. Heintz, Liu chaired the bipartisan Commission on the Practice of Democratic Citizenship of the American Academy of Arts and Sciences. The commission, which was launched "to explore how best to respond to the weaknesses and vulnerabilities in our political and civic life and to enable more Americans to participate as effective citizens in a diverse 21st-century democracy", issued a report, titled Our Common Purpose: Reinventing American Democracy for the 21st Century, in June 2020. The report included strategies and policy recommendations "to help the nation emerge as a more resilient democracy by 2026."

== Awards and recognition ==
Liu was elected as a member of the American Academy of Arts and Sciences in 2020.

Liu was named an Ashoka Fellow in 2020. Fellows are leading social entrepreneurs recognized for their innovative solutions to social problems and potential to change patterns across society.

== Published works ==
- Next: Young American Writers on the New Generation (1994) OCLC 29259329
- The Accidental Asian: Notes of a Native Speaker (1998) OCLC 686758644
- Guiding Lights: The People Who Lead Us Toward Our Purpose in Life (2004) OCLC 55066751
- Guiding Lights: How to Mentor—and Find Life's Purpose (2006) OCLC 1035106244
- The True Patriot (2007) OCLC 176926192
- The Gardens of Democracy: A New American Story of Citizenship, the Economy, and the Role of Government (2011) OCLC 724655945
- A Chinaman's Chance: One Family's Journey and the Chinese American Dream (2014) OCLC 1352188448
- You're More Powerful Than You Think: A Citizen's Guide to Making Change Happen (2017) OCLC 975273171
- Become America: Civic Sermons on Love, Responsibility, and Democracy (2019) OCLC 1084634452
- Terenne, The Hidden Valley (2011)

== See also ==
- List of Asian American writers
