= Niyogi Committee Report on Christian Missionary Activities =

Report On Christian Missionary Activities
- Author: Niyogi Committee
- Language: English
- Subject: Report
- Genre: Non-fiction
- Publisher: Sonya
- Publication date: 1956, 1958, 1963, 1968, 1998 compiled and completed in 1954
- Publication place: India

The Niyogi Committee Report On Christian Missionary Activities is a report published by the Government of Madhya Pradesh in 1956. It is divided into two volumes and three parts. It is a report on controversial missionary activities in India and was compiled and completed in 1954 and published only in 1956. The committee which was chaired by M. Bhawani Shankar Niyogi, a retired Chief Justice of the Nagpur High Court included five other members viz. M.B.Pathak, Ghanshyam Singh Gupta, S.K.George, Ratanlal Malviya and Bhanu Pratap Singh.

The report, set up by a Congress Party government, recommended the "legal prohibition" of religious conversion not "completely voluntary", which was not implemented as it would have been "difficult to formulate and indeed to apply without violating the precepts of religious liberty enshrined in the Indian Constitution".

== The Niyogi Committee Report ==
The committee contacted 11,360 persons, interviewed people from 700 different villages and received 375 written statements and 385 replies from a questionnaire. They visited hospitals, schools, churches and other institutions in 14 districts. It toured several areas and talked to witnesses who were "mostly prejudiced". The questionnaire had 99 questions, and was described by the High Court thus:

a long and searching document.. in many places it amounts to an accusation. Some of the questions border on an inquisition, and may well be equated to a "fishing expedition" on the supposition that something discreditable can be discovered.

The committee recorded that "there was a general complaint from the non-Christian side that the schools and hospitals were being used as means of securing converts." It said that "Reference was also made to the practice of the Roman Catholic priests or preachers visiting newborn babies to give ‘ashish’ (blessings) in the name of Jesus, taking sides in litigation or domestic quarrels, kidnapping of minor children and abduction of women and recruitment of labour for plantations in Assam or Andaman as a means of propagating the Christian faith among the ignorant and illiterate people." (Goel 1998, p.13)

The report writes that especially Roman Catholic missions used money-lending as a device for proselytisation. They gave loans which were later written off if the debtor became a Christian. (Goel 1998, p.115)

== Controversy ==
The Committee was set up in response to the Bharatiya Jana Sangh's protest movement, "The Anti-Foreign Missionary Week"; the movement was suspended once the committee was formed.

The Roman Catholic Church withdrew its co-operation with the committee, and filed a petition against the committee at the High Court in 1955. The High Court dismissed the Petition in April 1956.

The report stirred controversy in India. It was criticized by theologians, Christians and politicians. The recommendations of the report influenced Bills passed by the State Governments against forcible conversions.

== The recommendations of the report ==
The committee gave the following recommendations:

- (1) those missionaries whose primary object is proselytisation should be asked to withdraw and the large influx of foreign missionaries should be checked;
- (2) the use of medical and other professional services as a direct means of making conversions should be prohibited by law;
- (3) attempts to convert by force or fraud or material inducements, or by taking advantage of a person's inexperience or confidence or spiritual weakness or thoughtlessness, or by penetrating into the religious conscience of persons for the purpose of consciously altering their faith, should be absolutely prohibited;
- (4) the Constitution of India should be amended in order to rule out propagation by foreigners and conversions by force, fraud and other illicit means;
- (5) legislative measures should be enacted for controlling conversion by illegal means;
- (6) rules relating to registration of doctors, nurses and other personnel employed in hospitals should be suitably amended to provide a condition against evangelistic activities during professional service; and
- (7) circulation of literature meant for religious propaganda without approval of the State Government should be prohibited. (Goel 1998, 163–164)
