= Le Livre noir du capitalisme =

1998 book by various authors

The Black Book of Capitalism
- Author: Gilles Perrault
- Original title: Le Livre noir du capitalisme
- Language: French
- Publication date: 1998

Le livre noir du Capitalisme (The Black Book of Capitalism) is a 1998 French book published in reaction to The Black Book of Communism (1997). Unlike the earlier work, Le livre noir du capitalisme's primary goal is not to try to attribute a number of victims to the political system in question. Rather, the body of the book comprises a series of independent works from various writers who each voice their critique on various aspects of capitalism. Topics covered range from the African slave trade to the effects of globalization.

An appendix provides an incomplete list of 20th-century death-tolls which editor Gilles Perrault attributes to the capitalist system. The list includes certain death-tolls covering the two World Wars, colonial wars, anti-communist campaigns, repressions and mass killings, ethnic conflicts, and victims of famines or malnutrition; bringing the incomplete total to 100 million deaths attributed to capitalism in the 20th century.

== Contributors ==
Contributors to the book include historians, sociologists, economists, trade unionists and writers such as:

Caroline Andréani, François Arzalier, Roger Bordier, Maurice Buttin, François Chesnais, Maurice Cury, François Delpla, François Derivery, André Devriendt, Pierre Durand, Jean-Pierre Fléchard, Yves Frémion, Yves Grenet, Jacques Jurquet, Jean Laïlle, Maurice Moissonnier, Robert Pac, Philippe Paraire, Paco Peña, André Prenant, Maurice Rajsfus, Jean Suret-Canale, Subhi Toma, Monique and Roland Weyl, Claude Willard, Jean Ziegler

Translations of the book have appeared in Greek, Portuguese, Spanish, Italian and Czech.

== Index ==
- I. Why a book about Capitalism
- II. Totalitarian neo-liberalism
- III. Origins of Capitalism: XV-XIX centuries
- IV. An slave-focused economy and capitalism: a quantifiable evaluation.
- V. The First World War: 15 million dead and 30 million injured in 3 years and a half.
- VI. The counter-revolution and the foreign interventions in Russia (1917–1922)
- VII. An immense Guernica.
- VIII. The Second World War.
- IX. On the origins of wars and a paroxysmal form of capitalism
- X. Imperialism, Zionism and Palestine.
- XI. War and oppression. War and punishment: The cost in Vietnam.
- XII. The fascist annexation of East Timor.
- XIII. Africa under French colonial mandate.
- XIV. African independence and “communism”
- XV. North American interventions in Latin America.
- XVI. The Long March of African Americans in the United States. The unfinished dream.
- XVII. A century of genocide in Cuba. Weiler's reconcentration policy.
- XVIII. The genocide of the indigenous American aborigines.
- XIX. The capitalist assault on Asia.
- XX. Migrations in the 19th and 20th centuries: A contribution to the history of capitalism.
- XXI. Capitalism, the arms race, and commercial arms. The Military-Industrial Complex.
- XXII. The living dead of globalization.
- XXIII. Swiss bankers kill without weapons.
- XXIV. A pub is worth a thousand bombs (advertising crimes in modern warfare).
- XXV. When the abolition of capitalism is not enough.
- XXVI. Capitalism and barbarism: The dark portrait of the massacres and wars of the 20th century.

== See also ==
- Criticism of capitalism
- Schwarzbuch Kapitalismus
- The Black Book of Communism
- Le Livre noir du colonialisme

== Bibliography ==
- Perrault, Gilles, ed. (1998). Le Livre Noir du Capitalisme. Le Temps des cerises. 427 pages. ISBN 978-2-84109-144-7.
