= Mirror Image (novel) =

1998 novel by Danielle Steel

- First ed. cover
- Author: Danielle Steel
- Language: English
- Genre: Romance
- Publisher: Delacorte Press
- Publication date: 1998 (first edition)
- Publication place: United States
- Media type: Print
- Pages: 426 p.
- ISBN: 0385315090
- OCLC: 777720221

Mirror Image is the 45th novel by Danielle Steel. It's about identical twins Victoria and Olivia Henderson, born in 1893. The novel is set during the First World War. The book, considered historical fiction, was published by Delacorte on November 3, 1998.

== Plot summary ==
When Victoria's reputation is seriously at risk, the only way to save it is by marrying the handsome lawyer Charles Dawson, who also happens to work for the girls' father, Edward Henderson. Shy, serious Olivia is inclined to stay and help their father, who is ill, but free-spirited Victoria needs her the most when her marriage seems to be failing. Charles's 10-year-old son, Geoffrey, who is still distraught after losing his mother Susan, Charles' first wife, on the Titanic, complicates the situation.

When Victoria proposes an unthinkable plan, Olivia is forced to accept, leaving her with a marriage she never thought she could have and her sister going off to help in France, when World War I is in full throttle.
