= 2021 deaths in the United States (January–June) =

- Decades: 2000s; 2010s; 2020s; 2030s
- See also: History of the United States (2016–present); Timeline of United States history (2010–present); List of years in the United States

Deaths in the first half of the year 2021 in the United States. For the last half of the year, see 2021 deaths in the United States (July–December).

== January ==
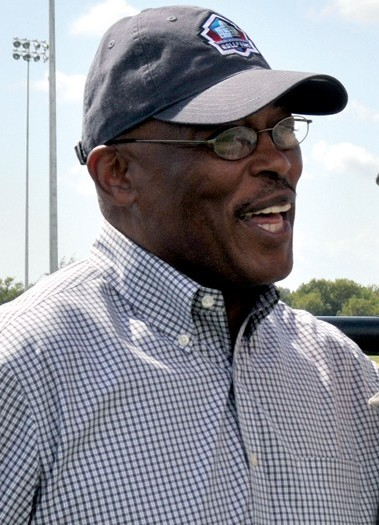
Floyd Little

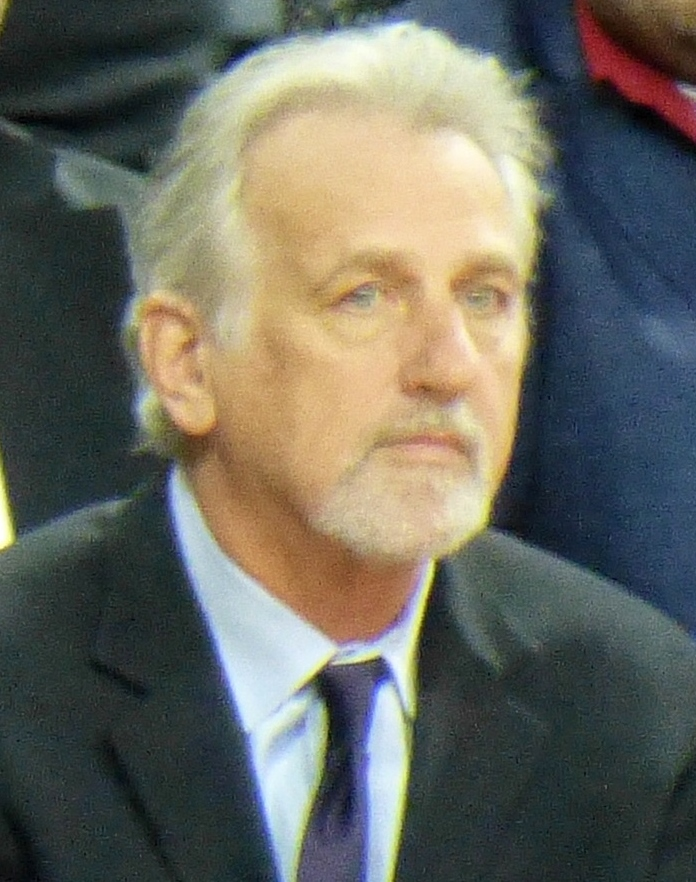
Paul Westphal

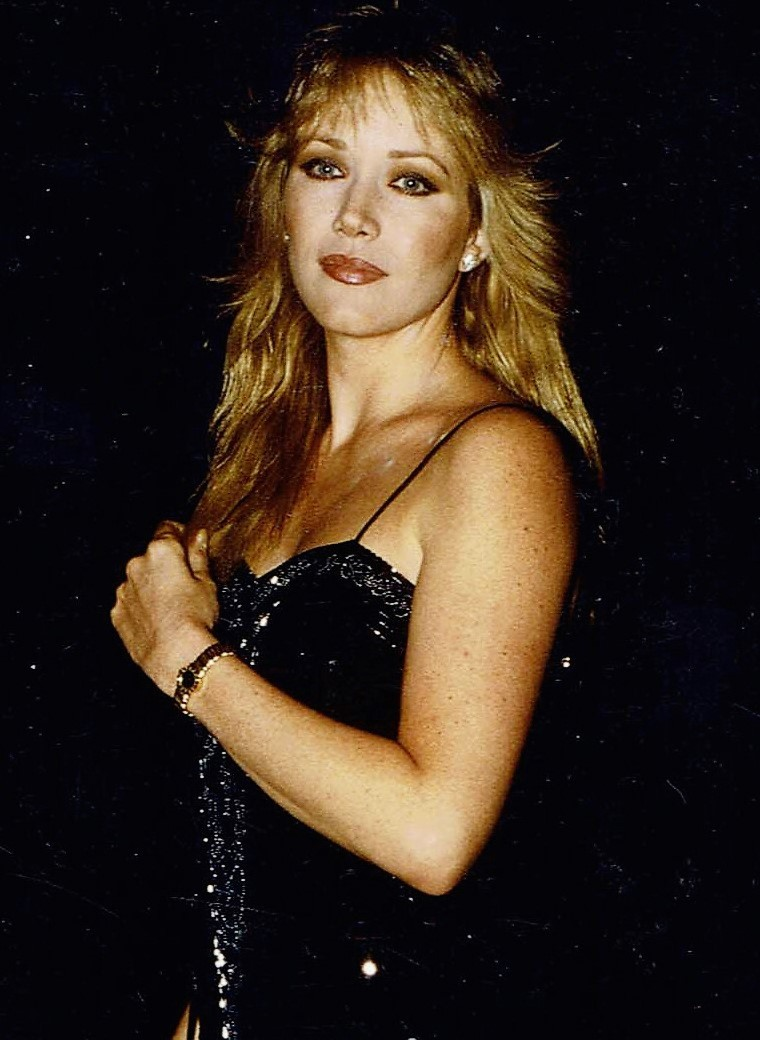
Tanya Roberts

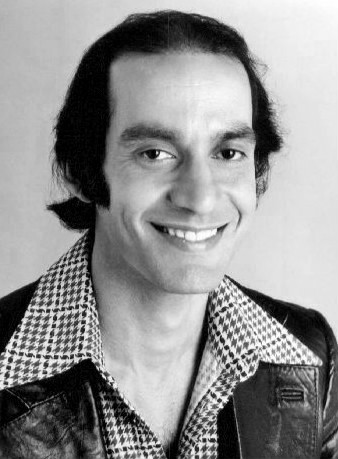
Gregory Sierra

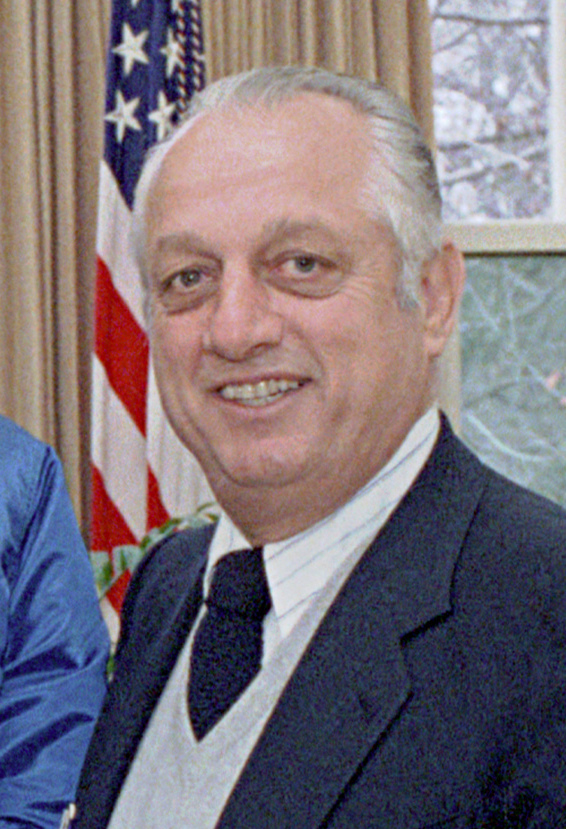
Tommy Lasorda

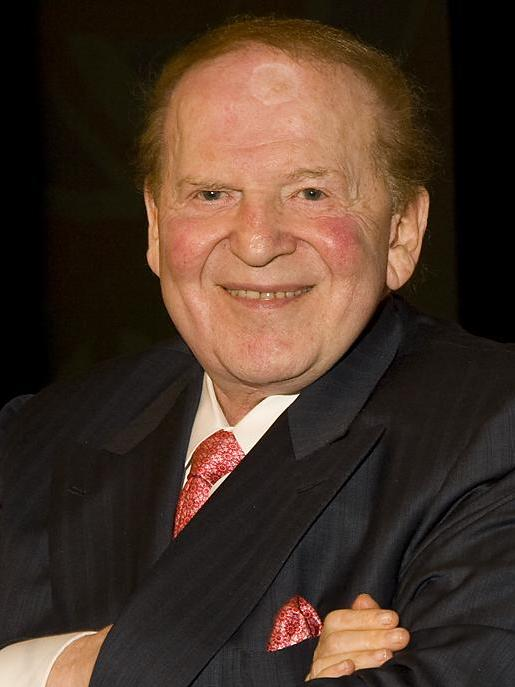
Sheldon Adelson

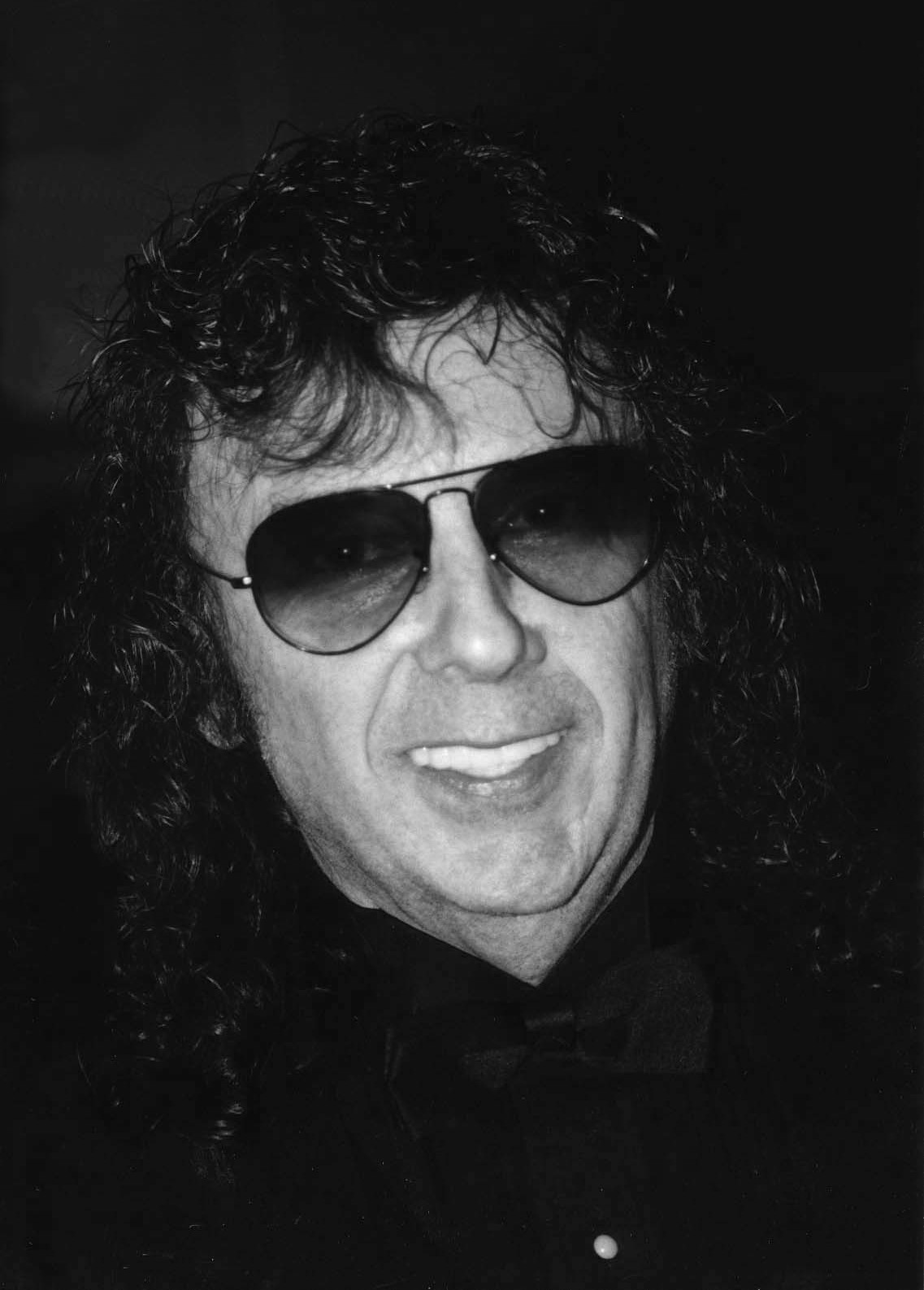
Phil Spector

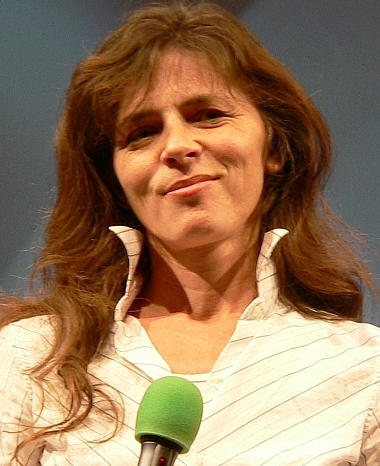
Mira Furlan

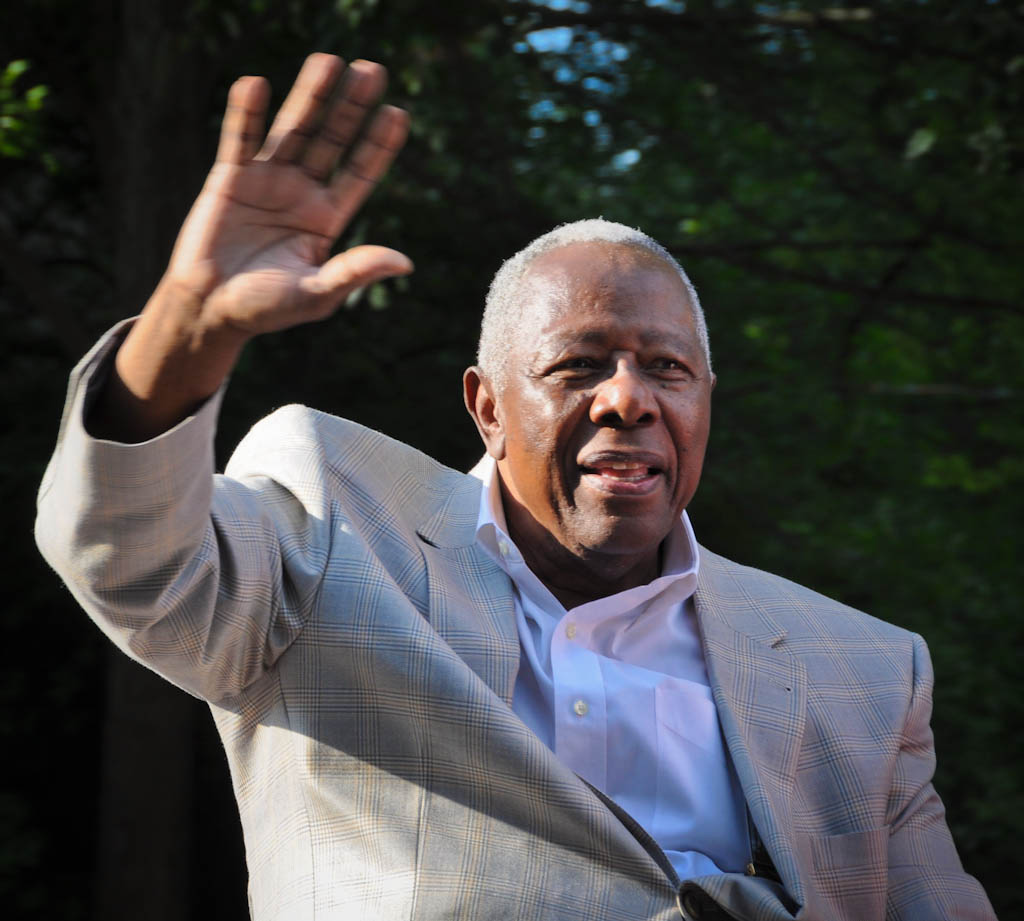
Hank Aaron

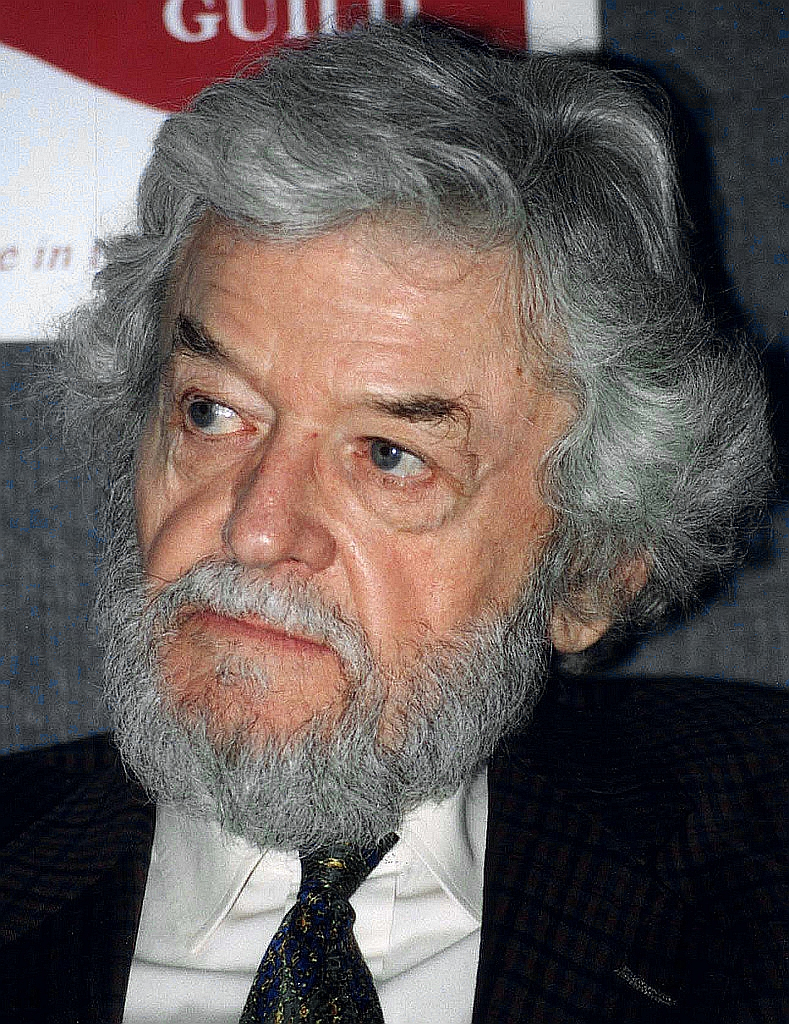
Hal Holbrook

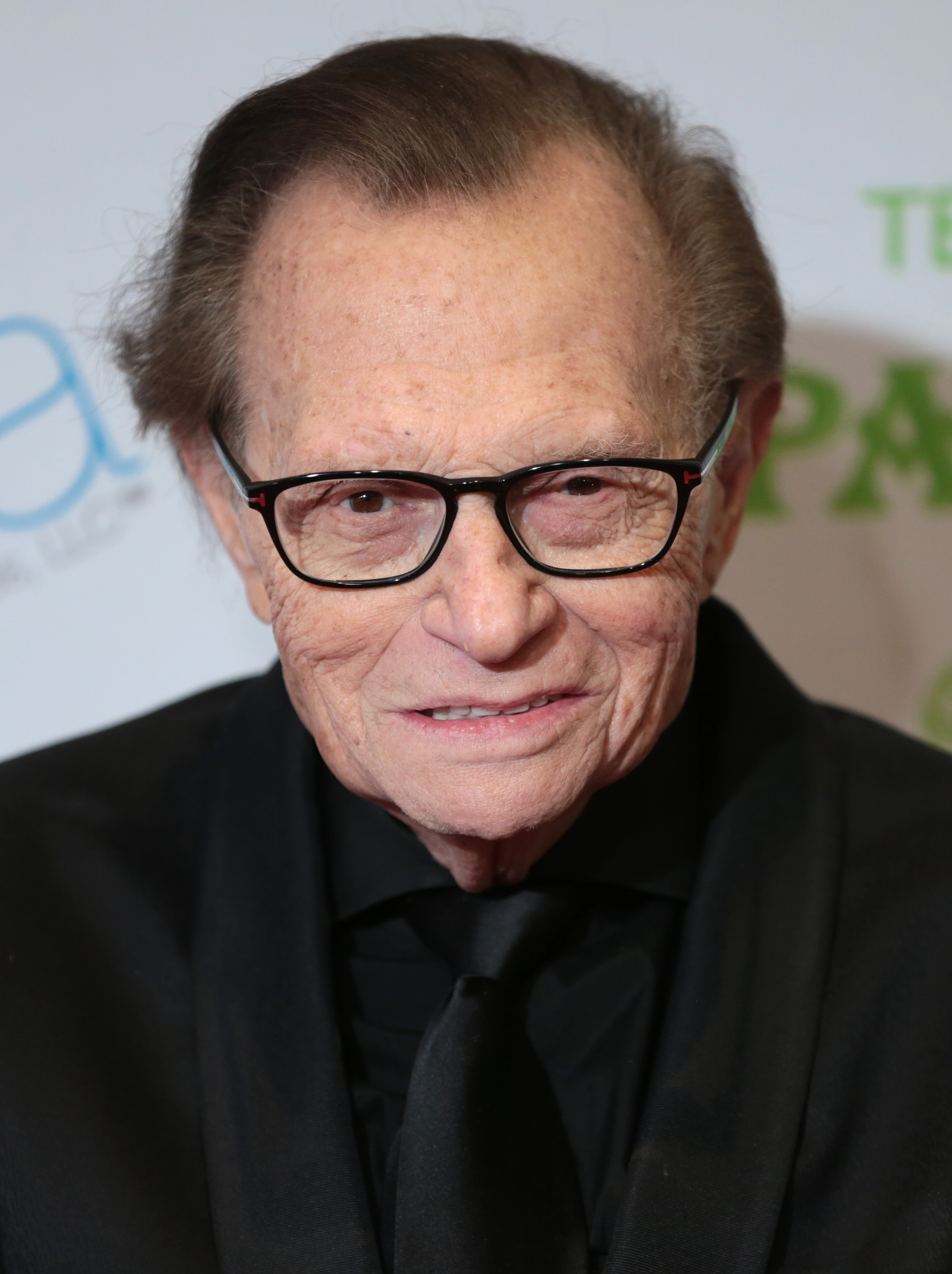
Larry King

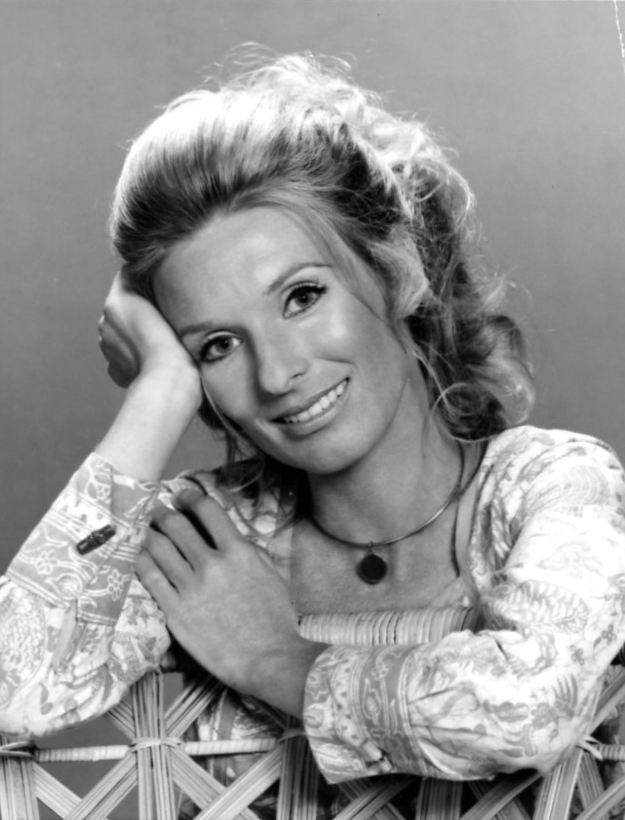
Cloris Leachman

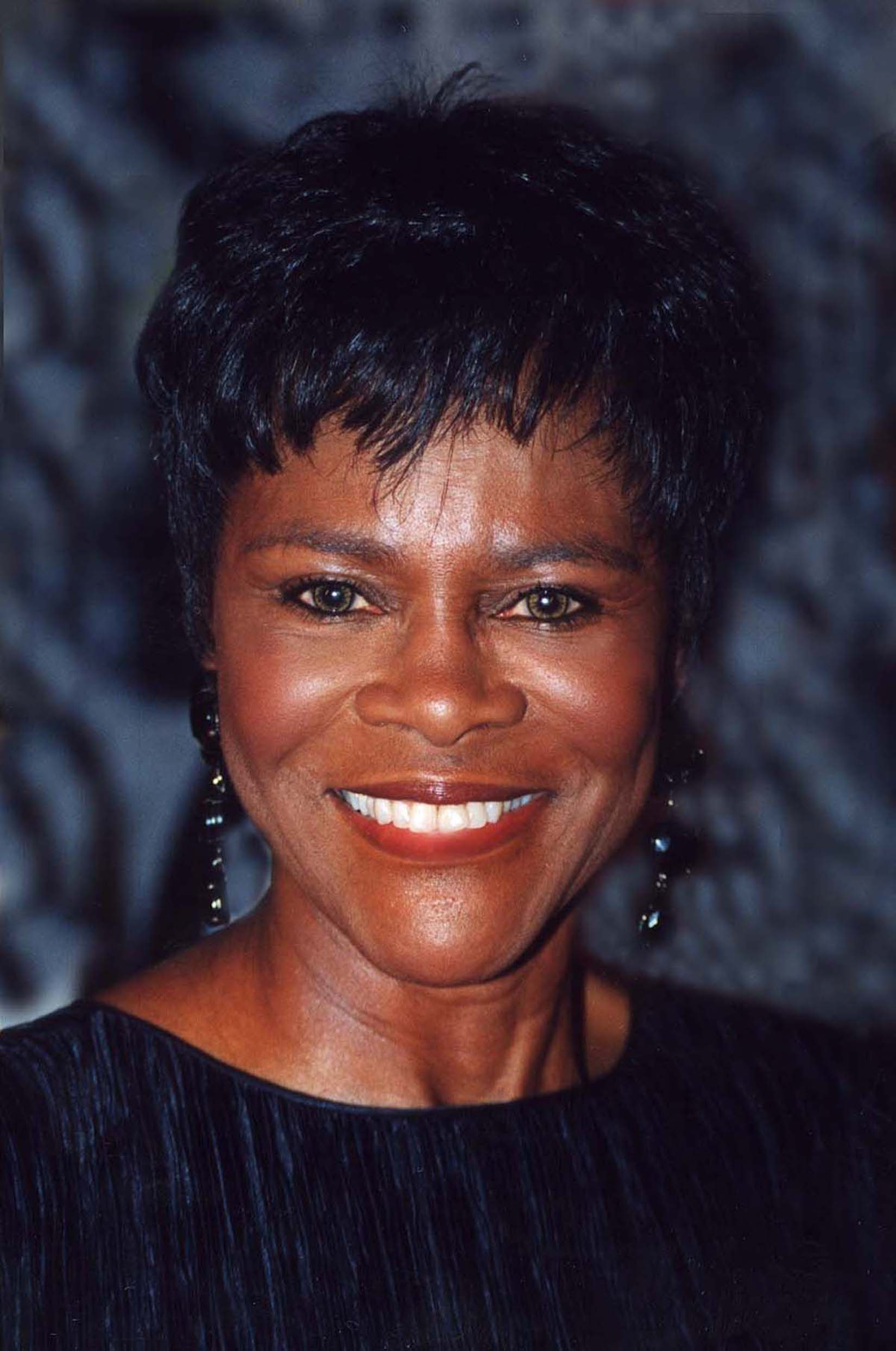
Cicely Tyson

- January 1
  - Ben Chafin, 60, politician, member of the Virginia House of Delegates (2014) and Senate (since 2014) (b. 1960)
  - Ron Dominguez, 85, business and theme park executive, vice-president of Disneyland (1974–1990) and of Walt Disney Attractions, West Coast (1990–1994) (b. 1935)
  - George Gerdes, 72, singer, songwriter and actor (Hidalgo, L.A. Noire, The Girl with the Dragon Tattoo) (b. 1948)
  - Floyd Little, 78, Hall of Fame football player (Syracuse Orange, Denver Broncos) (b. 1942)
  - Misty Morgan, 75, country music singer (Jack Blanchard & Misty Morgan) (b. 1945)
  - Paige Rense, 91, writer and editor, editor-in-chief of Architectural Digest (1975–2010) (b. 1929)
  - George Whitmore, 89, mountaineer and conservationist (b. 1931)
- January 2
  - Mary Catherine Bateson, 81, writer and cultural anthropologist (b. 1939)
  - Brad Cox, 76, computer scientist (b. 1944)
  - Carrie Dann, 88/89, Western Shoshone indigenous rights activist and spiritual leader (b. 1932)
  - Robert Livingston, 87, Zen Buddhist teacher (b. 1933)
  - W. B. Park, 84, cartoonist and illustrator (b. 1936)
  - Mike Reese, 42, politician, member of the Pennsylvania House of Representatives (since 2009) (b. 1978)
  - Don Salls, 101, football player (Alabama Crimson Tide) and coach (Jacksonville State Gamecocks) (b. 1919)
  - Gary Staples, 80, politician, member of the Mississippi House of Representatives (1988–1992, 2004–2020) (b. 1940)
  - Paul Westphal, 70, Hall of Fame basketball player (Boston Celtics, Phoenix Suns, Seattle SuperSonics, New York Knicks), coach (Phoenix Suns, Seattle SuperSonics, Sacramento Kings) and commentator (b. 1950)
- January 3
  - Lee Breuer, 83, academic, educator, filmmaker, lyricist, playwright (The Gospel at Colonus), poet and theater director (b. 1937)
  - Eric Jerome Dickey, 59, author (b. 1961)
  - Dick Kulpa, 67, cartoonist (Cracked, Weekly World News) (b. 1953)
  - Donald Perry Polsky, 92, architect (b. 1928)
  - George F. Regas, 90, Episcopal priest, rector of All Saints Episcopal Church (Pasadena) (1967–1995) (b. 1930)
  - James C. Renick, 72, academic administrator, 4th Chancellor of the University of Michigan-Dearborn (1993–1999) and 9th Chancellor of the North Carolina Agricultural and Technical State University (1999–2006) (b. 1948)
- January 4
  - Tom Acker, 90, baseball player (Cincinnati Redlegs/Reds) (b. 1930)
  - Ronnie Burgess, 57, football player (Green Bay Packers) (b. 1963)
  - Seymour Van Gundy, 89, nematologist (University of California, Riverside) (b. 1931)
  - Sandra Hutchens, 65, law enforcement officer and official, Sheriff-Coroner of Orange County, California (2008–2019) (b. 1955)
  - Jonas Neubauer, 39, Tetris player, seven-time world champion (b. 1981)
  - Bernard P. Randolph, 87, general (b. 1933)
  - Tanya Roberts, 65, actress (Charlie's Angels, A View to a Kill, That '70s Show), producer and model (b. 1955)
  - Gregory Sierra, 83, actor (Sanford and Son, Barney Miller, The Other Side of the Wind) (b. 1937)
- January 5
  - Jerry Berger, 87, public relations practitioner, press agent and journalist (St. Louis Globe-Democrat, St. Louis Post-Dispatch) (b. 1933)
  - C. George Boeree, 68, Dutch-born American psychologist (Shippensburg University) (b. 1952)
  - Christina Crosby, 67, scholar and writer (b. 1953)
  - Thereasea Elder, 93, public health nurse (b. 1927)
  - Patricia C. Frist, 81, banker and philanthropist (b. 1939)
  - Don Leppert, 90, baseball player (Baltimore Orioles) (b. 1930)
  - Pat Patrick, 91, racing team owner (Patrick Racing) (b. 1929)
  - Thelma Shoher Baker, 96, educator and anthropologist (b. 1924)
- January 6
  - Jonathan Aldrich, 84, poet and educator (b. 1936)
  - Kenneth Z. Altshuler, 91, psychiatrist and psychoanalyst (Columbia University, UT Southwestern Medical Center) (b. 1929)
  - Ashli Babbitt, 35, protester who participated in the January 6 United States Capitol attack
  - Thomas G. Carpenter, 94, educator and academic administrator, President of the University of North Florida (1969–1980) and University of Memphis (1980–1991) (b. 1926)
  - Peter S. Eagleson, 92, hydrologist (Massachusetts Institute of Technology) and author (b. 1928)
  - Bobby Few, 85, jazz pianist and vocalist (b. 1935)
  - Eldon Fortie, 79, football player (BYU Cougars, Edmonton Eskimos) (b. 1941)
  - Donald Frith, 96, ceramic artist and academic (b. 1924)
  - Jim Haynes, 87, American-British underground and avant-garde theatre producer, co-founder of the Traverse Theatre and International Times (b. 1933)
  - Gerald Hiken, 93, actor (Car 54, Where Are You?, Invitation to a Gunfighter, Reds) (b. 1927)
  - Laurence H. Kedes, 83, scientist (Stanford University, University of Southern California) (b. 1937)
  - Barry Schwartz, 83, sociologist (b. 1938)
  - Burt Wilson, 87, philosopher, writer, jazz musician, playwright, political activist and advertising executive (b. 1933)
- January 7
  - Robbins Burling, 94, anthropologist and sociolinguist (University of Pennsylvania, University of Michigan) (b. 1926)
  - Deezer D, 55, rapper and actor (CB4, ER, Romy and Michele's High School Reunion) (b. 1965)
  - Grant Gondrezick, 57, basketball player (Phoenix Suns, Los Angeles Clippers, Limoges CSP) (b. 1963)
  - Taky Kimura, 96, Japanese-American martial artist (b. 1924)
  - Tom LaBonge, 67, politician, member of the Los Angeles City Council (2001–2015) (b. 1953)
  - Tommy Lasorda, 93, Hall of Fame baseball player (Brooklyn Dodgers, Kansas City Athletics), manager (Los Angeles Dodgers) and coach (Los Angeles Dodgers) (b. 1927)
  - Jamie O'Hara, 70, country musician and songwriter ("Older Women", "Grandpa (Tell Me 'Bout the Good Old Days)"), Grammy winner (1987) (b. 1950)
  - Lonnie Perrin, 68, football player (Denver Broncos, Chicago Bears, Washington Redskins) (b. 1952)
  - Marion Ramsey, 73, actress (Police Academy, Return to Babylon, Lavalantula) and singer (b. 1947)
  - Neil Sheehan, 84, journalist, Pulitzer Prize winner (1989) (b. 1936)
  - Brian Sicknick, 42, police officer (U.S. Capitol Police) (b. 1978)
  - Mel Weitsman, 91, Buddhist priest, founder of the Berkeley Zen Center (b. 1929)
- January 8
  - Meredith Anding, 79, civil rights activist (b. 1941)
  - William H. Barbour Jr., 79, judge (1983–2006), chief judge (1989–1996) and senior judge (since 2006) of the U.S. District Court for the Southern District of Mississippi (b. 1941)
  - Harold Bornstein, 73, gastroenterologist (b. 1947)
  - Ed Bruce, 81, country music singer-songwriter ("Mammas Don't Let Your Babies Grow Up to Be Cowboys", "You're the Best Break This Old Heart Ever Had") and actor (Bret Maverick) (b. 1939)
  - David Buchsbaum, 91, mathematician (Brandeis University) (b. 1929)
  - Steve Carver, 75, film director (Big Bad Mama, Capone, Lone Wolf McQuade), producer and photographer (b. 1945)
  - John Corcoran, 83, logician, mathematician and philosopher (University at Buffalo (SUNY), University of Pennsylvania) (b. 1937)
  - David Darling, 79, cellist and composer (b. 1941)
  - Steve Hendrickson, 54, football player (San Francisco 49ers, Dallas Cowboys, San Diego Chargers, Houston Oilers, Philadelphia Eagles) (b. 1966)
  - Mike Henry, 84, football player (Pittsburgh Steelers, Los Angeles Rams) and actor (Tarzan films, Smokey and the Bandit) (b. 1936)
  - Peter W. Huber, 68, lawyer and non-fiction writer (b. 1952)
  - Steve Lightle, 61, comic book artist (Doom Patrol, Legion of Super-Heroes, The Flash) (b. 1959)
  - Jay W. McGee, 70, American-Canadian musician (b. 1950)
  - Diana Millay, 85, actress (The Secret Storm, Street of Sinners, Dark Shadows) (b. 1935)
  - Samuel L. Myers Sr., 101, economist, educationist and civil rights advocate (b. 1919)
  - Deborah Rhode, 68, legal scholar (b. 1952)
  - Don Robertson, 92, television announcer (CBS Sports) (b. 1928)
  - Shirley Wilson, 95, football player and coach (Elon University, Duke University) (b. 1925)
- January 9
  - Jerry Douglas, 85, director and writer (b. 1935)
  - John Lutz, 81, mystery writer (b. 1939)
  - John Joseph Ryba, 91, politician, member of the Wisconsin State Assembly (1993–2003) (b. 1929)
  - Caroly Wilcox, 89, puppeteer (b. 1931)
  - Jeannette Wood, 88, politician, member of the Washington House of Representatives (1988–1994) and Senate (1994–1999) (b. 1932)
- January 10
  - Harry Brown, 72, basketball player (b. 1948)
  - Nancy Walker Bush Ellis, 94, philanthropist (b. 1926)
  - Tom Gannon, 77, politician, member of the Pennsylvania House of Representatives (1979–2006) (b. 1943)
  - Wayne Radford, 64, basketball player (Indiana Pacers) (b. 1956)
  - Dee Rowe, 91, college basketball coach (b. 1929)
  - Antonio Sabàto Sr., 77, Italian-American actor (Grand Prix, One Dollar Too Many, Due volte Giuda) (b. 1943)
  - Julie Strain, 58, actress and model (b. 1962)
- January 11
  - Sheldon Adelson, 87, businessman, investor, political donor and philanthropist (b. 1933)
  - Edward Beard, 80, politician, member of the Rhode Island House of Representatives (1972–1974) and the U.S. House of Representatives (1975–1981) (b. 1940)
  - Lionel Gossman, 91, Scottish-American literary scholar (b. 1929)
  - Ronald J. Hays, 92, admiral (b. 1928)
  - Howard Johnson, 79, jazz musician (b. 1941)
  - Tetsuo Najita, 84, historian (b. 1936)
  - Prentice E. Sanders, 83, police officer (b. 1937)
  - Margo St. James, 83, women's rights activist and sex worker (b. 1937)
  - Paul Taylor, 81/82, engineer (b. 1939)
  - William E. Thornton, 91, astronaut (b. 1929)
  - Stacy Title, 56, film director, screenwriter, and producer (b. 1964)
- January 12
  - Bruce Bennett, 77, football player (Saskatchewan Roughriders) (b. 1943)
  - Carlos Joseph, 40, football player (b. 1980)
  - Tim Lester, 52, football player (b. 1968)
  - Fred Levin, 83, lawyer (b. 1937)
  - Barry Lewis, 75, architectural historian (b. 1945)
  - Christopher P. Monkhouse, 73, architectural historian (b. 1947)
  - Keith Valigura, 63, politician, member of the Texas House of Representatives (1985–1991) (b. 1957)
- January 13
  - Howard Andrew, 86/87, poker player (b. 1934)
  - Tim Bogert, 76, rock bassist and vocalist (b. 1944)
  - Duke Bootee, 69, rapper and songwriter (b. 1951)
  - Sir Robert Cohan, 95, American-born British dancer, choreographer, and artistic director (b. 1925)
  - Frank J. Coppa, 83, historian, author, and educator (b. 1937)
  - Siegfried Fischbacher, 81, German-American magician and entertainer (b. 1939)
  - Benjamin F. Gibson, 89, judge (1979–1996), chief judge (1991–1995) and senior judge (1996–1999) of the U.S. District Court for the Western District of Michigan (b. 1931)
  - Ben Hines, 85, baseball coach (b. 1935)
  - Bryan Monroe, 55, journalist, editor, and educator (b. 1965)
  - Lisa Marie Montgomery, 52, convicted murderer (b. 1968)
  - Sylvain Sylvain, 69, Egyptian-born American rock guitarist (b. 1951)
- January 14
  - Eiji Hashimoto, 89, Japanese-American harpsichordist, orchestra conductor, and professor (b. 1931)
  - Shirley Johnson, 83, politician, member of the Michigan House of Representatives (1981–1992, 1993–1998) and Senate (1999–2004) (b. 1937)
  - John LaRose, 69, baseball player (b. 1951)
  - Harold Lawrence McPheeters, 97, psychiatrist (b. 1923)
  - Peter Mark Richman, 93, actor (b. 1927)
  - Joanne Rogers, 92, pianist and puppeteer (b. 1928)
  - Ron Samford, 90, baseball player (b. 1930)
  - Larry Willoughby, 70, country singer-songwriter and music executive (b. 1950)
- January 15
  - William R. Allen, 96, economist, professor and author (b. 1924)
  - Dale Baer, 70, animator (b. 1950)
  - Wilbur Brotherton, 98, politician, member of the Michigan House of Representatives (1975–1988) (b. 1922)
  - Tyrone Crawley, 62, boxer (b. 1958)
  - Bruce Headley, 86, thoroughbred trainer and owner (b. 1934)
  - Kathleen Krull, 68, children's writer and book editor (b. 1952)
  - Lệ Thu, 77, Vietnamese-American singer (b. 1943)
  - Thomas V. Miller Jr., 78, politician, member of the Maryland House of Delegates (1971–1975), member (1975–2020) and President (1987–2020) of the Maryland Senate (b. 1942)
  - J. Michael Schweder, 71, politician, member of the Pennsylvania House of Representatives (1975–1980) (b. 1949)
  - Jon Westling, 78/79, educator and academic administrator, 8th President of Boston University (1996–2002) (b. 1942)
  - Gerald Wiegert, 76, automotive businessman and engineer (b. 1944)
  - James White, 78, politician, member of the New Mexico House of Representatives (2009–2014) and Senate (2016–2021) (b. 1942)
- January 16
  - Jon Arnett, 85, football player (Los Angeles Rams, Chicago Bears) (b. 1935)
  - Sharon Begley, 64, journalist (b. 1956)
  - Jerry Brandt, 82, club owner and manager (b. 1938)
  - Little Walter DeVenne, 73, radio host (b. 1948)
  - Dustin Higgs, 48, convicted murderer (b. 1972)
  - Jim MacGeorge, 92, voice actor and writer (b. 1928)
  - Jimmy Powell, 85, golfer (b. 1935)
  - Phil Spector, 81, record producer, musician, songwriter and convicted murderer (b. 1939)
  - Paul Varelans, 51, mixed martial artist (b. 1969)
- January 17
  - Dave Arnold, 49, politician, member of the Pennsylvania Senate (2020–2021) (b. 1971)
  - Robert Cheezic, 82, martial artist (b. 1939)
  - Brian Christie, Unk, television news journalist, talk show host and anchor (b. Unk)
  - Barbara Gronemus, 89, politician, member of the Wisconsin State Assembly (1982–2008) (b. 1931)
  - Muriel Grossfeld, 80, Olympic gymnast (b. 1940)
  - Marlin Kuykendall, 86, politician (b. 1934)
  - Gerald Locklin, 79, poet and lecturer (b. 1941)
  - Junior Mance, 92, jazz pianist, composer and educator (b. 1928)
  - Sammy Nestico, 96, jazz composer and arranger (b. 1924)
  - Vincent M. Rizzotto, 89, Roman Catholic prelate and Auxiliary Bishop of Galveston–Houston (2001–2006) (b. 1931)
  - Maynard Wallace, 77, politician, member of the Missouri House of Representatives (2003–2011) (b. 1943)
- January 18
  - Lubomir Kavalek, 77, Czech-American chess player (b. 1943)
  - Don Sutton, 75, baseball player (b. 1945)
  - Perry Botkin Jr., 87, composer and musician (b. 1933)
  - Jimmie Rodgers, 87, pop singer (b. 1933)
- January 20
  - Mira Furlan, 65, Croatian-American actress (b. 1955)
  - Lonnie Nielsen, 67, golfer (b. 1953)
  - Ted Thompson, 68, football player and executive (b. 1953)
- January 21
  - Bob Avian, 83, choreographer and theatre producer (b. 1937)
  - Randy Parton, 67, singer-songwriter, actor, businessman, and younger brother of Dolly Parton (b. 1953)
- January 22
  - Hank Aaron, 86, baseball player (b. 1934)
  - Tony Jones, 54, football player (b. 1966)
  - Sharon Kay Penman, 75, historical novelist (b. 1945)
- January 23
  - Walter Bernstein, 101, screenwriter and movie producer (b. 1919)
  - Hal Holbrook, 95, actor (b. 1925)
  - Larry King, 87, talk show host (b. 1933)
  - Andrew Brooks, 51, medical researcher (b. 1969)
- January 24
  - Sonny Fox, 95, television host (b. 1925)
  - Bruce Kirby, 95, actor (b. 1925)
  - Barry Le Va, 79, sculptor and installation artist (b. 1941)
  - Frank Shankwitz, 77, philanthropist and co-founder of the Make-A-Wish Foundation (b. 1943)
- January 25
  - Mike Bell, 63, Hall of Fame motorcycle racer and mountain bike rider (b. 1957)
  - Marie Harmon, 97, actress (b. 1923)
- January 26
  - Ron Johnson, 64, baseball player and coach (b. 1956)
  - Cindy Nemser, 83, art historian and feminist (b. 1937)
  - Sekou Smith, 48, sportswriter and journalist (b. 1972)
  - Margaret C. Snyder, 91, social scientist and feminist (b. 1929)
- January 27
  - Cloris Leachman, 94, actress (b. 1926)
  - Carmen Vázquez, 72, LGBT activist and writer (b. 1947)
  - Corky Lee, 73, photojournalist (b. 1947)
  - Goddess Bunny, 61, drag queen and actress (b. 1960)
- January 28
  - Cicely Tyson, 96, actress (b. 1924)
  - Heidi Weisel, 59, fashion designer (b. 1961/1962)
- January 29
  - John Chaney, 89, college basketball coach (b. 1932)
  - Grady Gaines, 86, blues saxophonist (b. 1934)
  - Richard L. Feigen, 90, gallery owner (b. 1930)
  - Flory Jagoda, 97, Bosnian-born musician and songwriter (b. 1923)
- January 30
  - Allan Burns, 85, television producer and screenwriter (b. 1935)
  - Double K, 43, rapper (b. 1977)
  - Eugenio Martínez, 98, Cuban-born operative and convicted criminal in the Watergate case (b. 1922)
  - Marc Wilmore, 57, comedian and screenwriter (b. 1963)
- January 31
  - Benedict J. Fernandez, 84, educator and photojournalist (b. 1936)
  - Abraham J. Twerski, 90, American-born Israeli Hasidic rabbi and psychiatrist (b. 1930)

== February ==
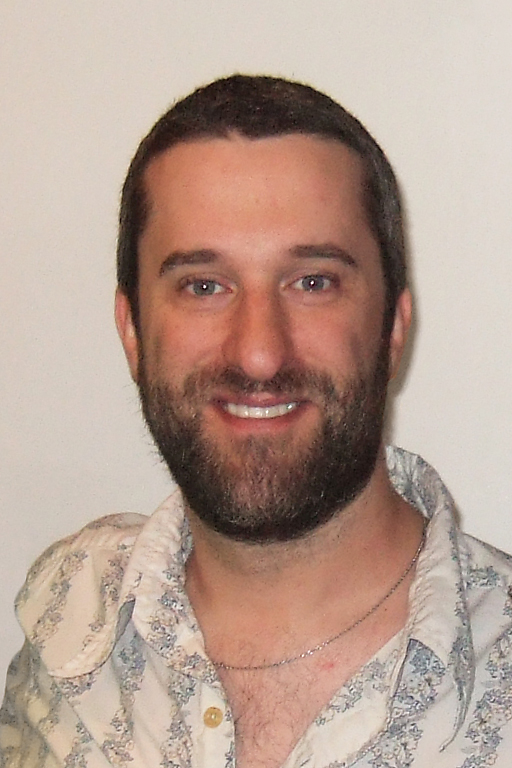
Dustin Diamond

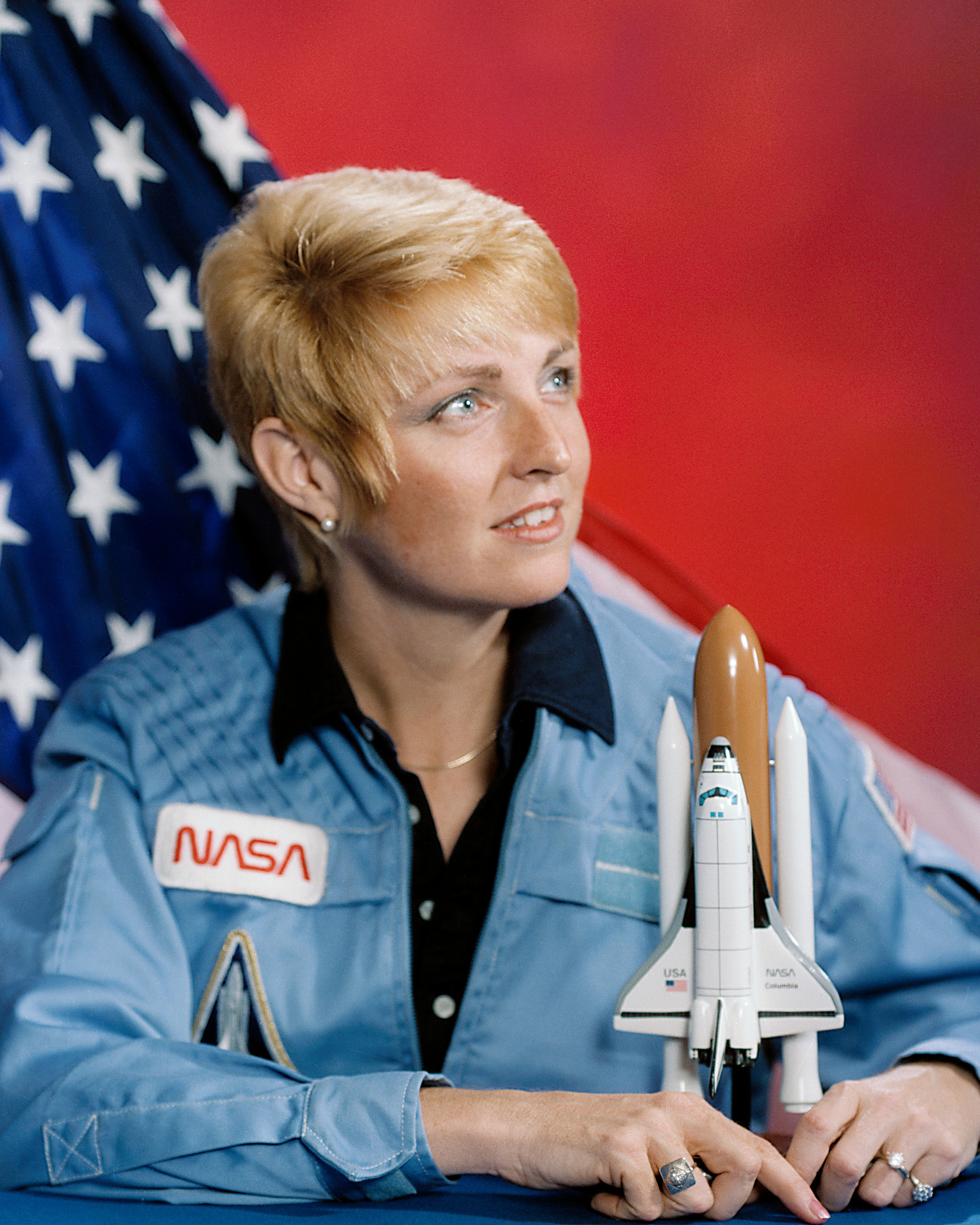
Millie Hughes-Fulford

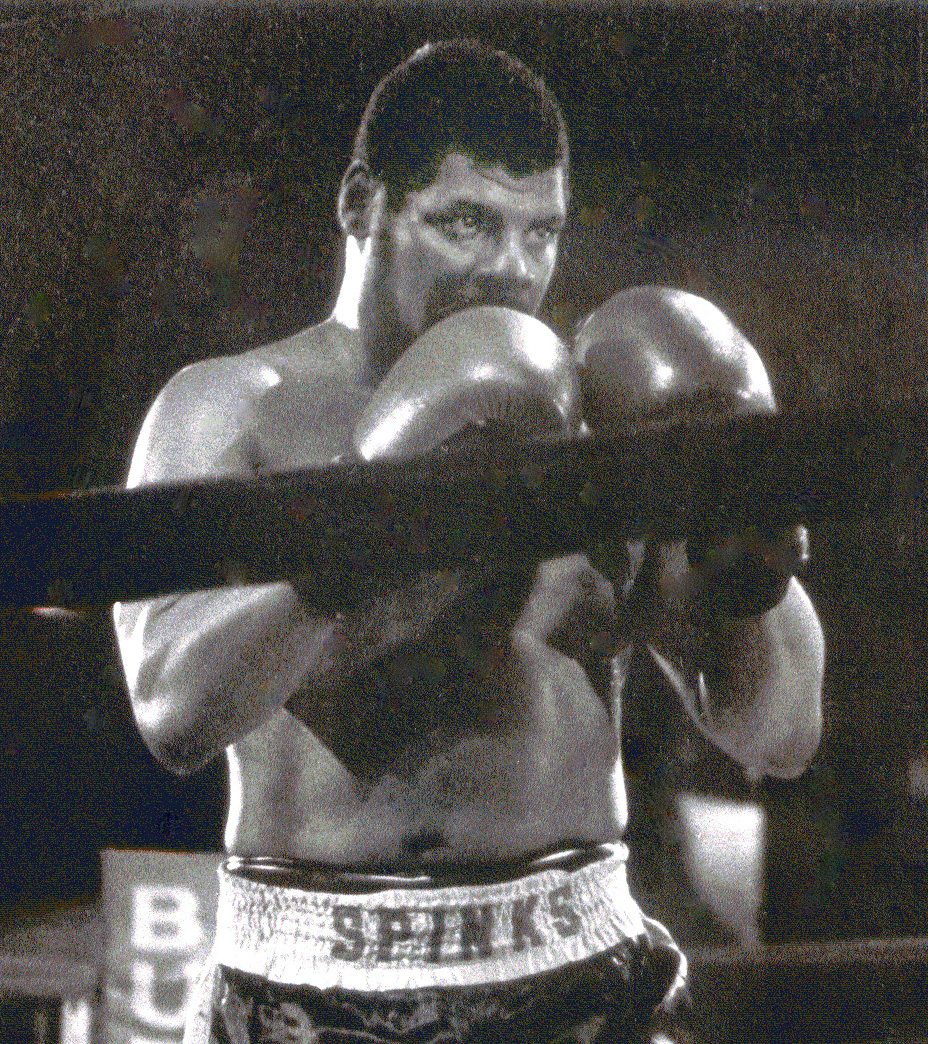
Leon Spinks

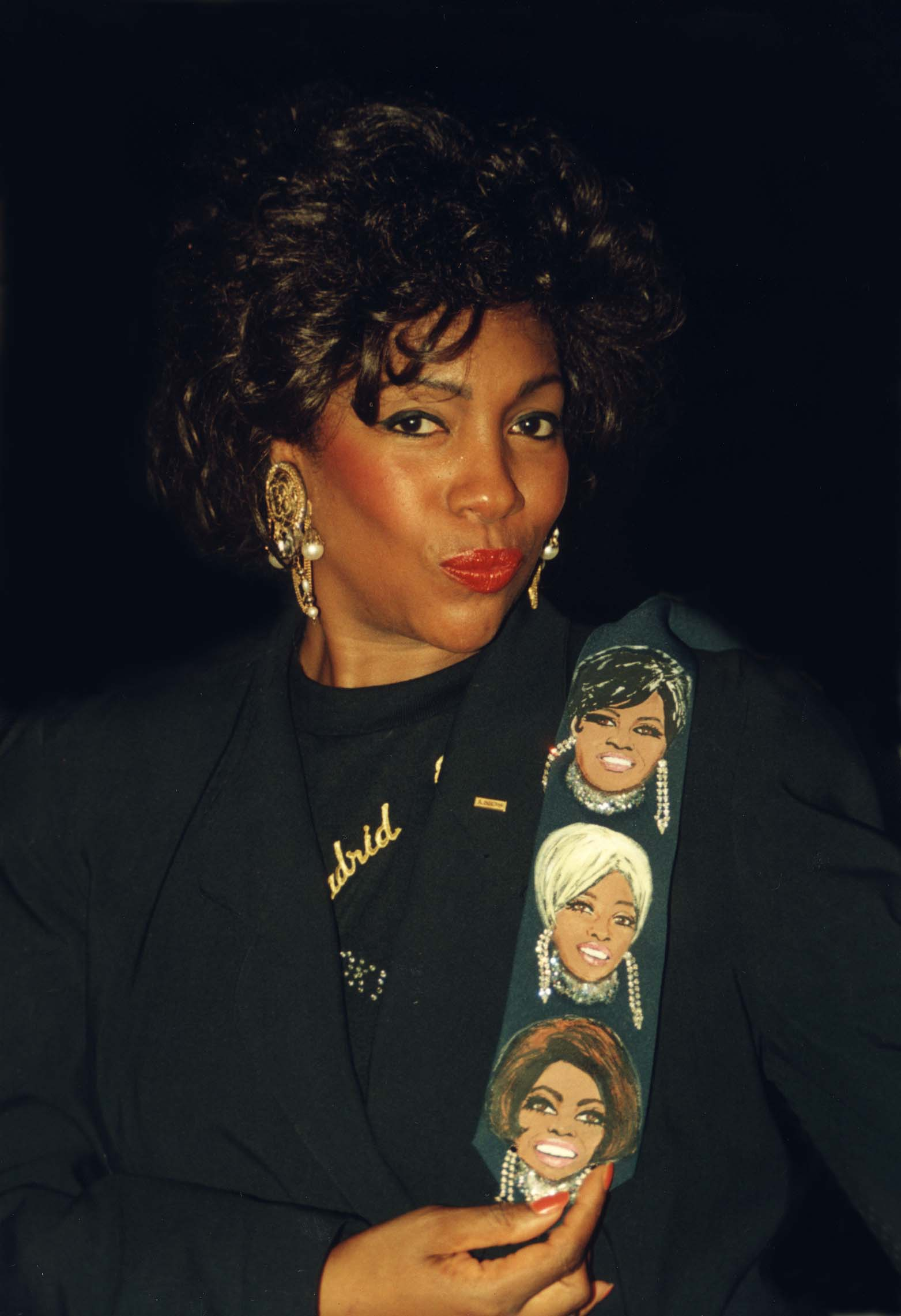
Mary Wilson

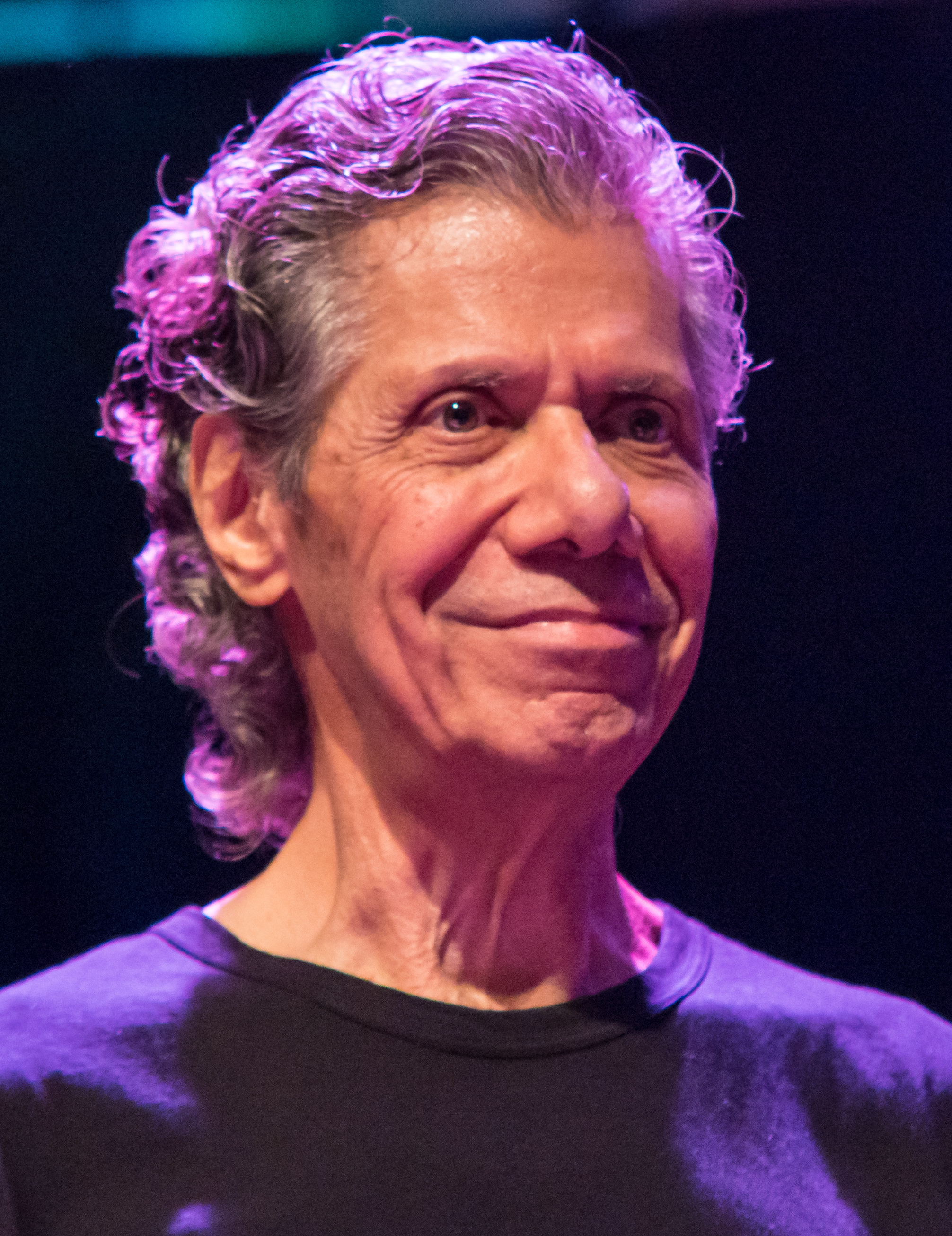
Chick Corea

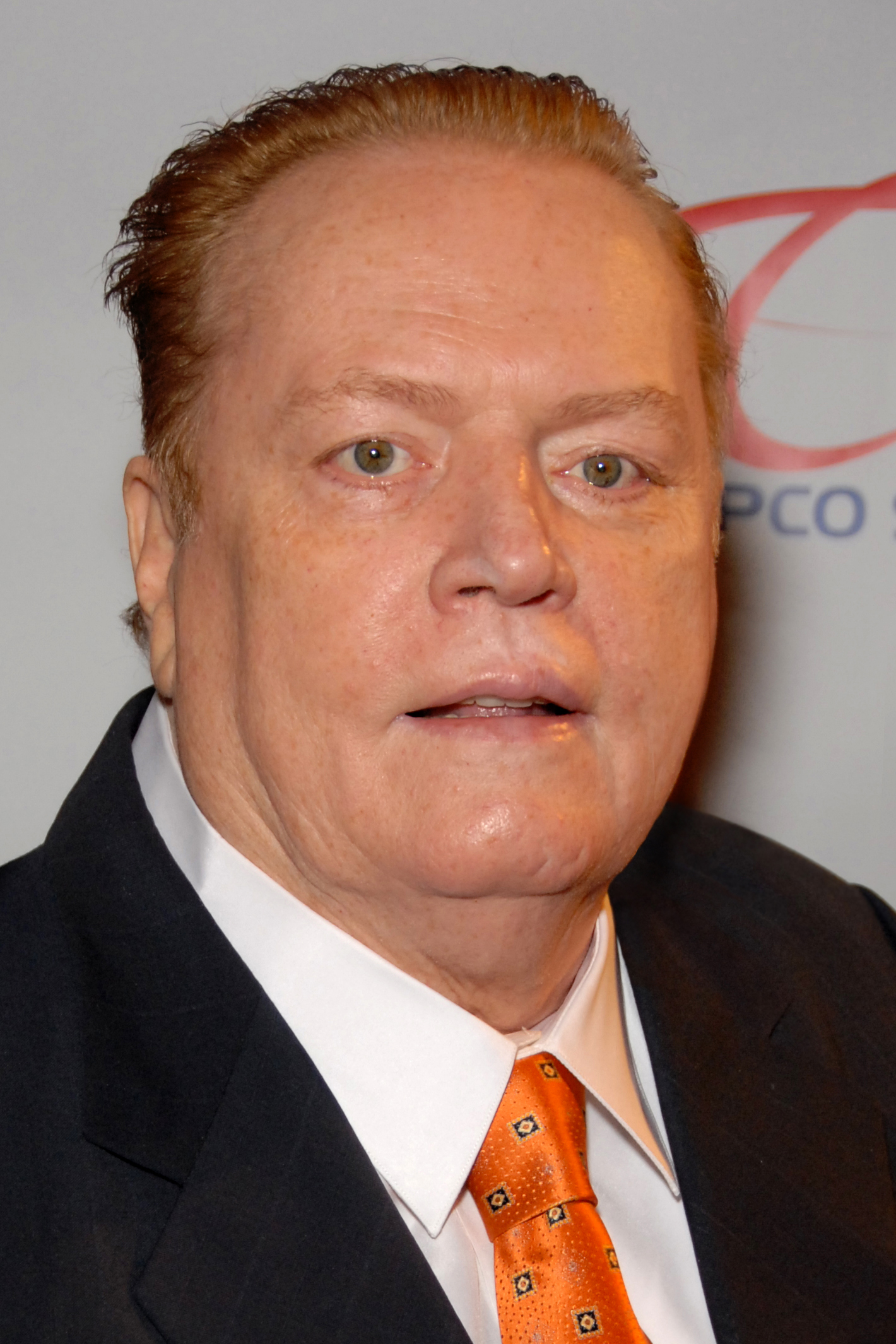
Larry Flynt

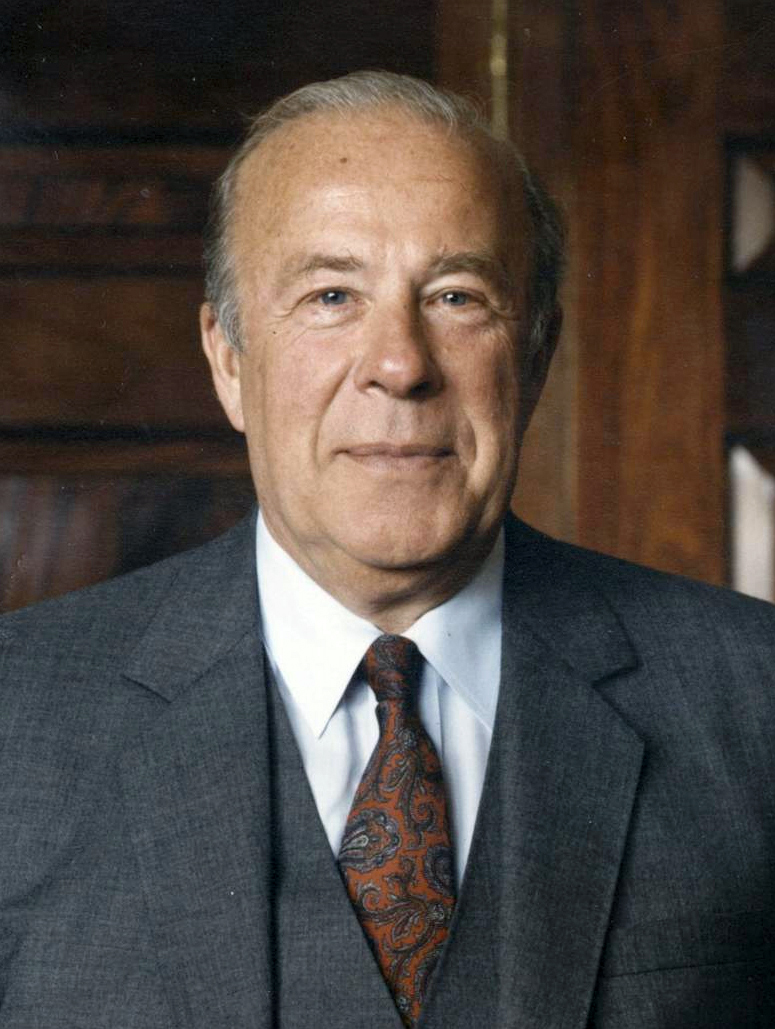
George Shultz

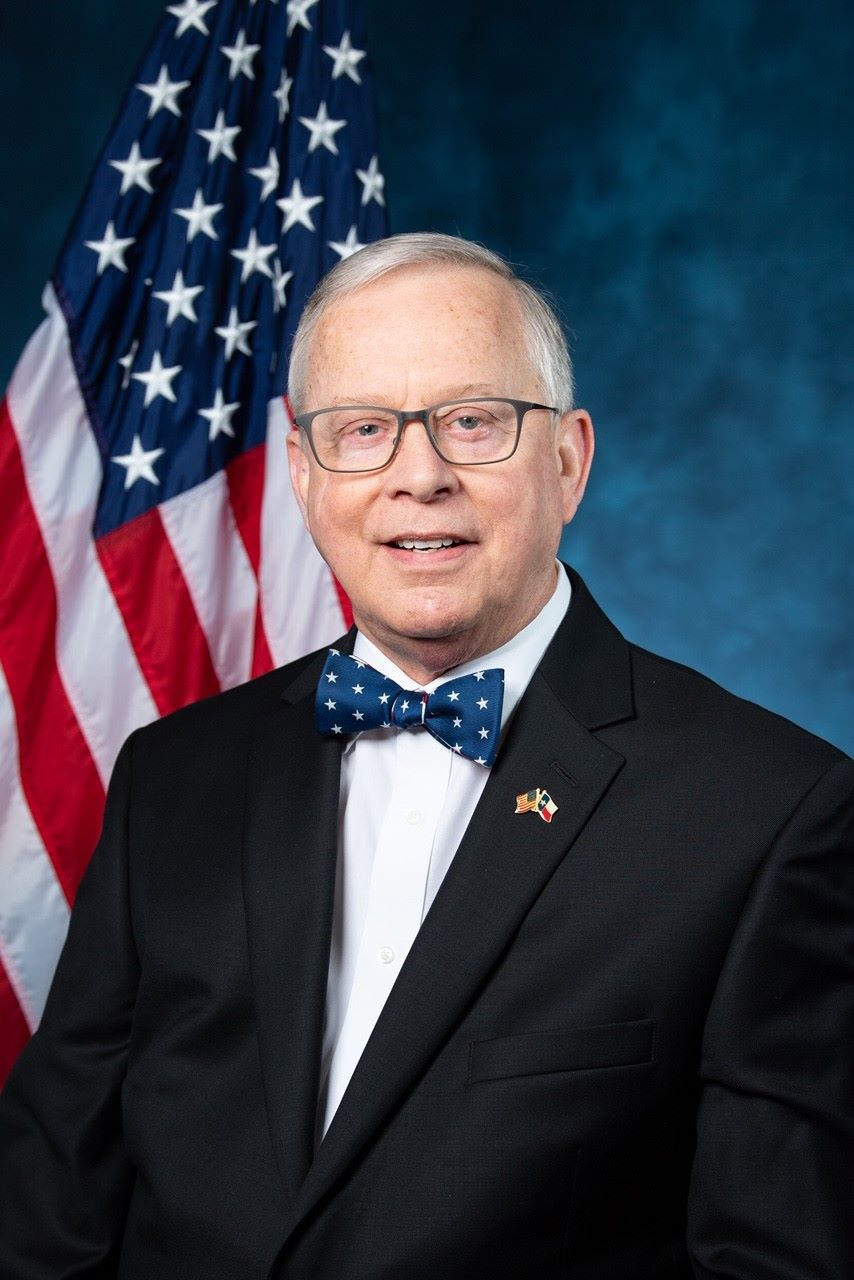
Ron Wright

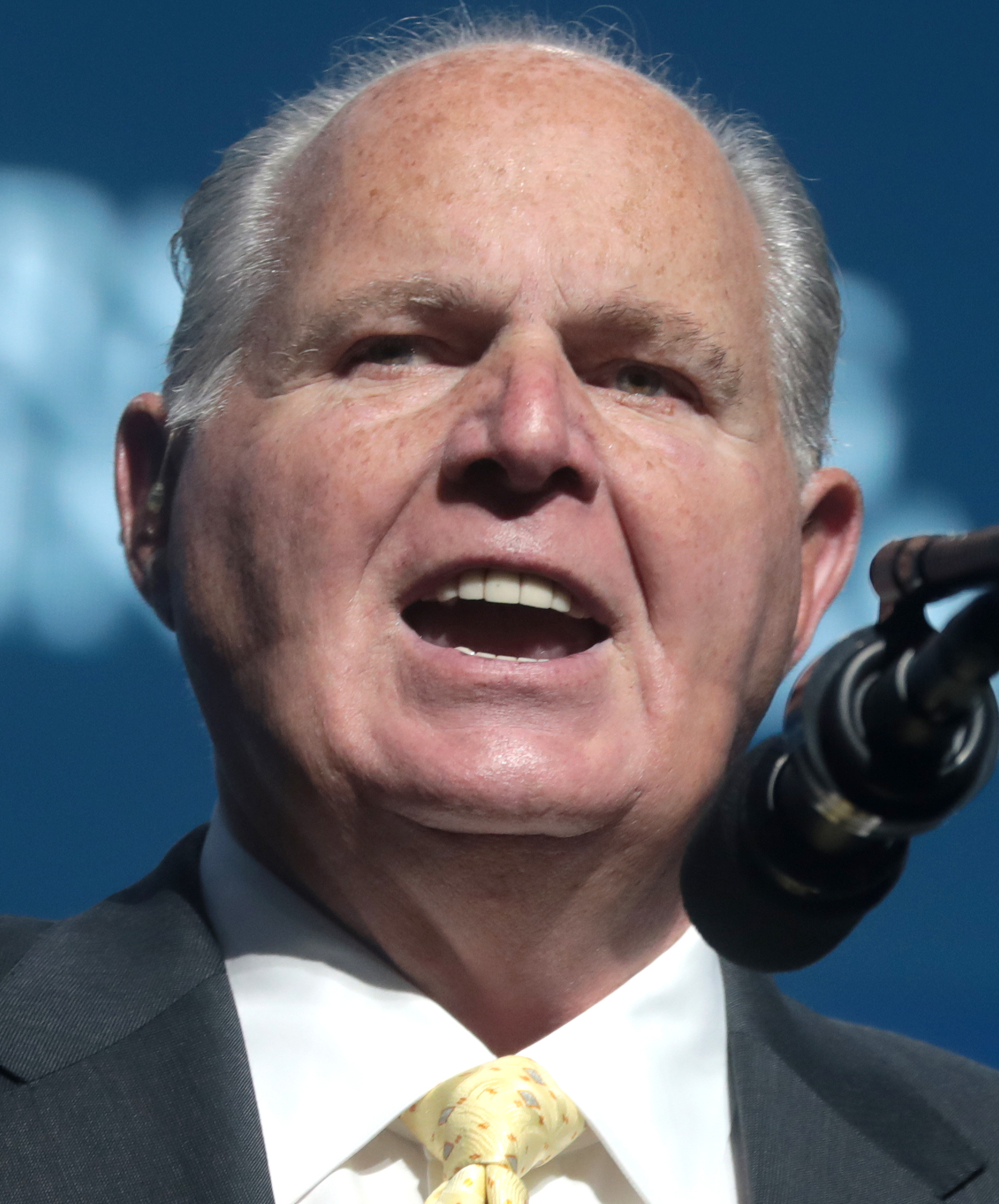
Rush Limbaugh

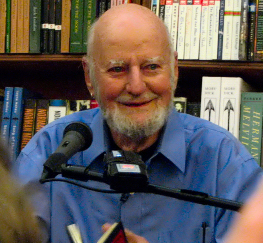
Lawrence Ferlinghetti

- February 1
  - Dustin Diamond, 44, actor and comedian (b. 1977)
  - Emil J. Freireich, 93, hematologist and oncologist (b. 1928)
  - Arlon Lindner, 85, politician (b. 1935)
  - Ricky Powell, 59, photographer (b. 1961)
  - Jamie Tarses, 56, television executive (b. 1964)
  - Robert C. Jones, 84, film editor and screenwriter (b. 1936)
  - John Sweeney, 86, labor leader, president of the AFL–CIO (b. 1934)
  - Jack Palladino, 76, private investigator and attorney (b. 1944)
- February 2
  - Millie Hughes-Fulford, 75, astronaut and molecular biologist (b. 1945)
  - Albert Hale, 70, politician (b. 1950)
  - Grant Jackson, 78, baseball player (b. 1942)
  - Harry Mark Petrakis, 97, author (b. 1923)
  - Rennie Davis, 80, antiwar activist, member of the Chicago Seven (b. 1940)
- February 3
  - Joann Aalfs, 85, women's rights and LGBT rights activist (b. 1923)
  - Anne Feeney, 69, folk singer (b. 1951)
  - Willard Hunter, 87, baseball player (b. 1935)
  - Tony Trabert, 90, tennis player (b. 1930)
  - Wayne Terwilliger, 95, baseball player (b. 1925)
  - Jim Weatherly, 77, Hall of Fame singer-songwriter (b. 1943)
- February 4
  - Dianne Durham, 52, gymnast (b. 1968)
  - Josh Evans, 48, football player (b. 1972)
  - David Shepard, 73, politician (b. 1947)
  - Robert A. Altman, 73, video game executive (b. 1947)
  - Hy Cohen, 90, baseball player (b. 1931)
- February 5
  - Susan Bayh, 61, attorney, first lady of Indiana (b. 1959)
  - Julio Canani, 82, horse breeder and trainer (b. 1938)
  - Rob Kane, 53, politician and auditor (b. 1967)
  - Charlie Krueger, 84, professional football player in the NFL (b. 1937)
  - Christopher Plummer, 91, Canadian actor (The Sound of Music, Beginners, All the Money in the World), Oscar winner (2012) (b. 1929)
  - Leon Spinks, 67, boxer (b. 1953)
- February 6
  - Thomas Rutherford Brett, 89, judge (b. 1931)
  - Rajie Cook, 90, graphic designer (b. 1930)
  - Maria Guarnaschelli, 79, cookbook editor and publisher (b. 1941)
  - Burwell Jones, 87, Olympic swimmer, doctor (b. 1933)
  - George Shultz, 100, politician, diplomat and economist (b. 1920)
- February 7
  - Billy Brown, 68, television celebrity and Alaskan Bush People patriarch (b. 1952)
  - Marshall Cassidy, 75, sportscaster (b. 1945)
  - Cathy Cochran, 76, judge (b. 1944)
  - Roz Cron, 95, saxophonist (b. 1925)
  - Pedro Gomez, 58, sports journalist (b. 1962)
  - Karen Lewis, 67, educator and labor leader (b. 1953)
  - J. Hillis Miller, 92, literary critic and scholar who advanced theories of literary deconstruction (b. 1928)
  - Ron Wright, 67, politician (b. 1953)
- February 8
  - Davey Armstrong, 64, Olympic boxer (b. 1956)
  - Claude Crabb, 80, football player (b. 1940)
  - Marty Schottenheimer, 77, football player and coach (b. 1943)
  - Anthony Sowell, 61, serial killer (b. 1959)
  - Mary Wilson, 76, singer and founding member of The Supremes (b. 1944)
- February 9
  - Chick Corea, 79, jazz keyboardist (b. 1941)
  - John Hora, 80, cinematographer (b. 1940)
- February 10
  - Larry Flynt, 78, porn publisher (b. 1942)
  - Billy Conigliaro, 73, baseball player (b. 1947)
  - Fanne Foxe, 84, Argentine-born stripper (b. 1936)
- February 11
  - S. Prestley Blake, 106, restaurateur (b. 1914)
  - Rusty Brooks, 63, wrestler and trainer (b. 1958)
  - Leslie E. Robertson, 92, structural engineer (b. 1928)
  - Isadore Singer, 96, mathematician (b. 1924)
  - Joan Weldon, 90, actress (b. 1930)
- February 12
  - Frederick K. C. Price, 89, pastor and televangelist (b. 1932)
  - Milford Graves, 79, drummer (b. 1941)
  - Lynn Stalmaster, 93, casting director (b. 1927)
- February 13
  - Bud Estes, 75, politician (b. 1946)
  - Dave Nalle, 61, political writer, game author and font designer who was active in the early history of the development of the internet (b. 1959)
  - Peter G. Davis, 84, music critic (b. 1936)
  - James Ridgeway, 84, investigative journalist (b. 1936)
- February 14
  - Zachary Wohlman, 32, boxer (b. 1988)
  - Lorenzo Washington, 34, football player (b. 1986)
  - Robert R. Glauber, 81, academic (b. 1939)
  - Ari Gold, 47, singer-songwriter (b. 1974)
- February 15
  - Florence Birdwell, 96, educator, musician and singer (b. 1924)
  - Vincent Jackson, 38, football player (b. 1983)
  - Derek Khan, 63, Trinidadian-American fashion stylist (b. 1957)
  - Johnny Pacheco, 85, Dominican-American musician and label executive (b. 1935)
  - Arne Sorenson, 62, hotel executive (b. 1958)
- February 16
  - Bernard Lown, 99, Lithuanian-born inventor and cardiologist, developer of the defibrillator (b. 1921)
  - Jessica McClintock, 90, fashion designer (b. 1930)
  - Carman, 65, contemporary Christian music singer, songwriter, television host, life coach, and evangelist (b. 1956)
- February 17
  - Rush Limbaugh, 70, radio personality (b. 1951)
  - Christine McHorse, 72, ceramics artist (b. 1948)
  - Martha Stewart, 98, actress and singer (b. 1922)
- February 18:
  - Prince Markie Dee, 52, rapper (b. 1968)
  - Frank Lupo, 66, television writer and producer (b. 1955)
- February 19
  - Arturo Di Modica, 80, Italian-American sculptor best known for Charging Bull (b. 1941)
  - Lawrence Otis Graham, 59, attorney and best-selling author (b. 1961)
  - Dianna Ortiz, 62, Roman Catholic nun and anti-torture advocate (b. 1958)
  - Jerold Ottley, 86, music director and longtime choral conductor of the Tabernacle Choir (b. 1934)
  - Naomi Rosenblum, 96, photography historian (b. 1922)
  - LaVannes Squires, 90, basketball player (b. 1931)
- February 20
  - Douglas Turner Ward, 90, playwright, actor, director, and theatrical producer (b. 1930)
  - Stan Williams, 84, baseball player and coach (b. 1946)
- February 21 – Doug Wilkerson, 73, football player (b. 1947)
- February 22
  - Lawrence Ferlinghetti, 101, poet (b. 1919)
  - Dick Witcher, 76, football player (b. 1944)
- February 23
  - Margaret Maron, 82, mystery writer (b. 1938)
  - Geoffrey Scott, 79, actor (b. 1942)
- February 24
  - Phoebe Liebig, 87, academic and gerontologist (b. 1933)
  - Alan Robert Murray, 66, Oscar-winning sound editor (b. 1954)
- February 25
  - John Geddert, 63, gymnastics coach (b. 1957)
  - Ivy Bottini, 94, artist and civil rights activist (b. 1926)
  - Joseph Duffey, 88, academic, anti-war activist and government official (b. 1932)
  - Darrius Johnson, 47, professional football player in the NFL (b. 1973)
  - Peter Gotti, 81, mobster and onetime leader of the Gambino family (b. 1939)
- February 26
  - Bob James, 68, rock music singer-songwriter (b. 1952)
  - Johnny De Fazio, 80, professional wrestler (WWWF) (b. 1940)
  - Mo Forte, 73, football coach (Denver Broncos) (b. 1947)
  - Philip Ray Martinez, 63, federal judge, U.S. District Court for the Western District of Texas (since 2002) (b. 1957)
  - Des McAleenan, 53, Irish-American soccer player (Connecticut Wolves, Albany Alleycats) and coach (New York Red Bulls) (b. 1967)
  - John Mendenhall, 72, football player (New York Giants) (b. 1948)
  - Joel A. Pisano, 71, federal judge, U.S. District Court for New Jersey (2000–2015) (b. 1949)
  - Bill C. Davis, 69, playwright best known for Mass Appeal (b. 1951)
- February 27
  - Louis Nix, 29, football player (b. 1991)
  - Russ Martin, 60, radio broadcaster (KEGL, KLLI-FM) (b. 1960)
  - Erica Watson, 48, actress (b. 1973)
- February 28
  - Michael J. Barron, 87, former chief judge of the Milwaukee County Circuit Court and a former member of the Wisconsin State Assembly (b. 1933)
  - Irv Cross, 81, football player and sportscaster (b.1939)
  - Tom Green, 72, Mormon polygamist (b. 1948)
  - Roger Kibbe, 81, serial killer (b. 1939)
  - Ian North, 68, punk and new wave musician (Milk 'N' Cookies) (b. 1952)

== March ==
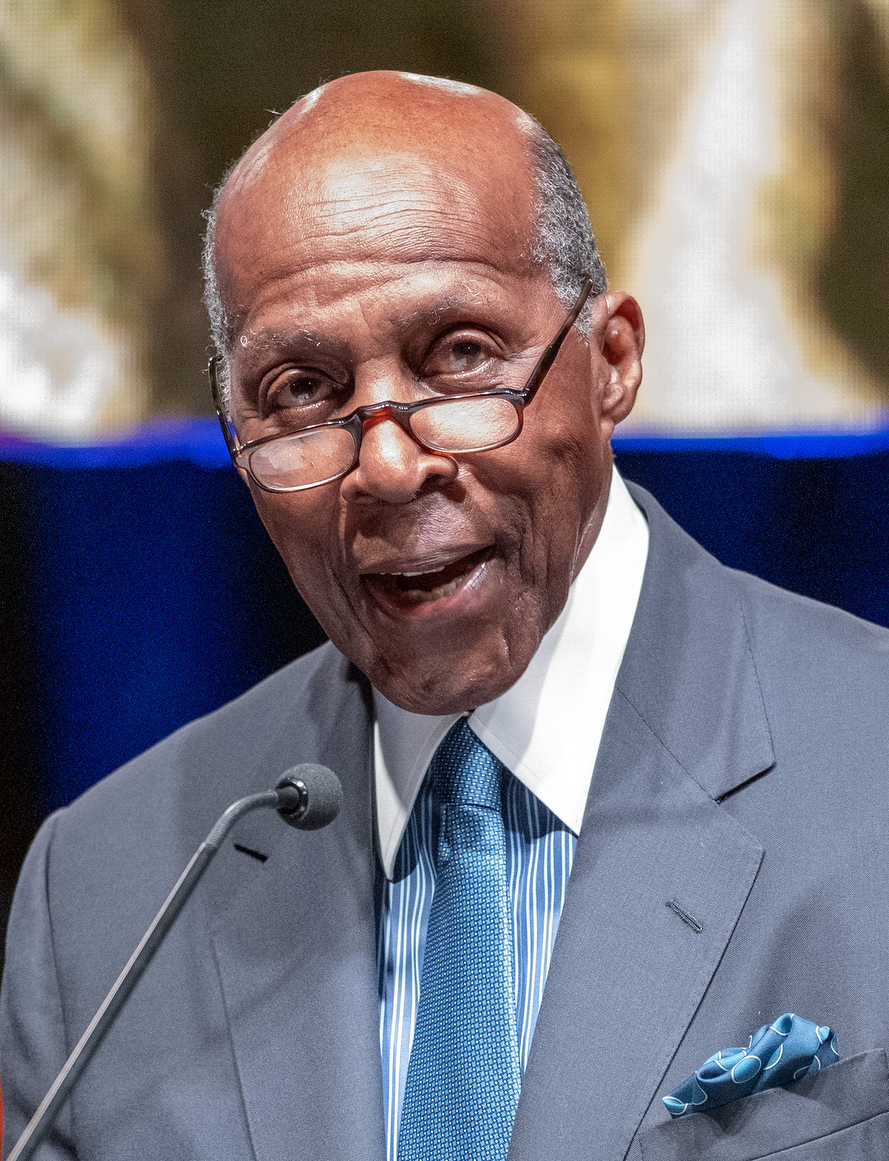
Vernon Jordan

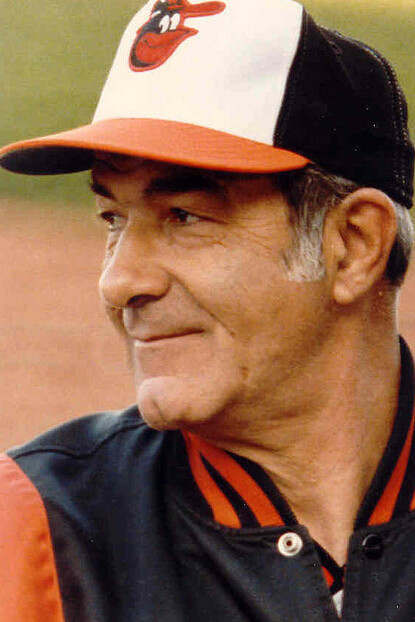
Joe Altobelli

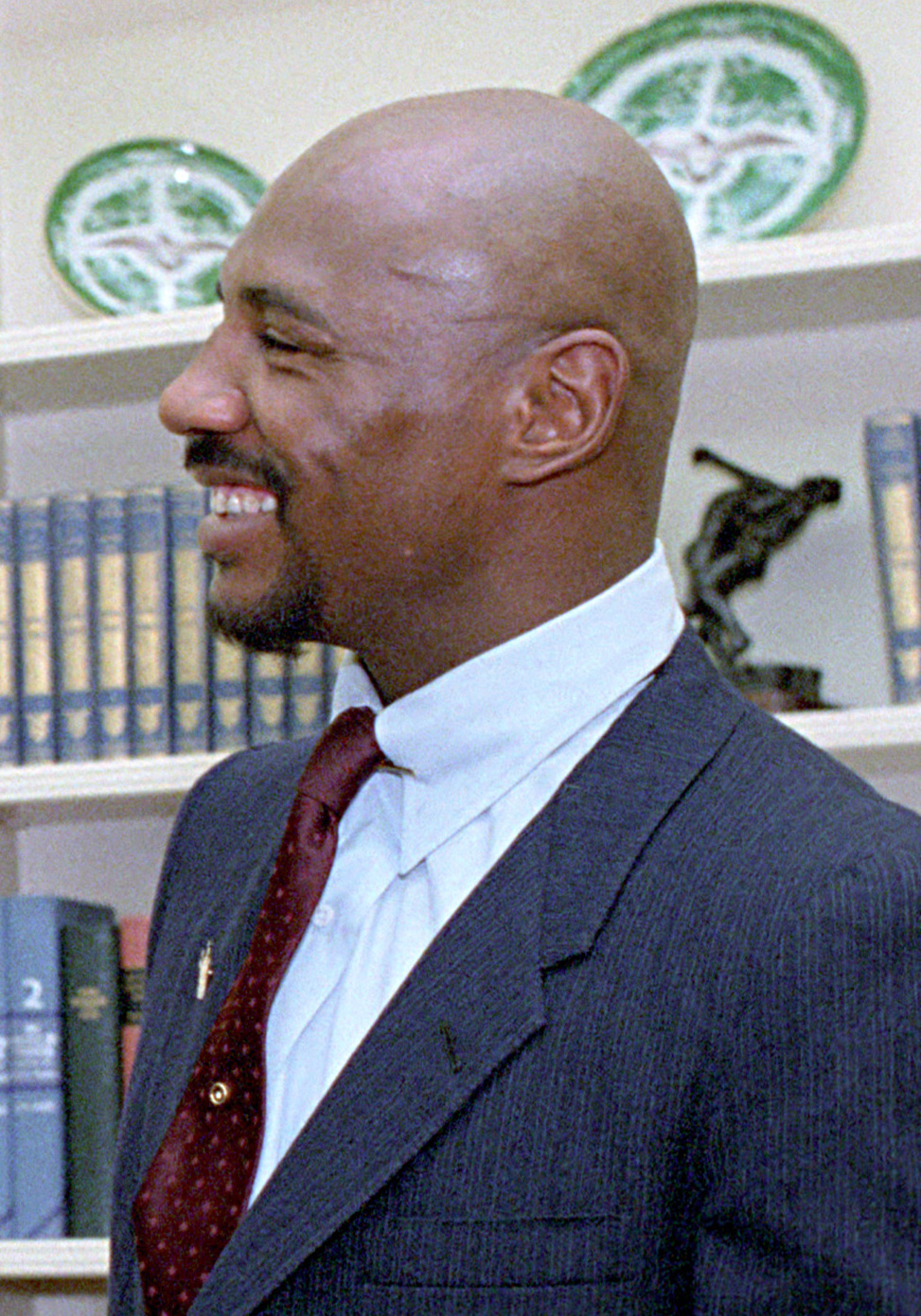
Marvelous Marvin Hagler

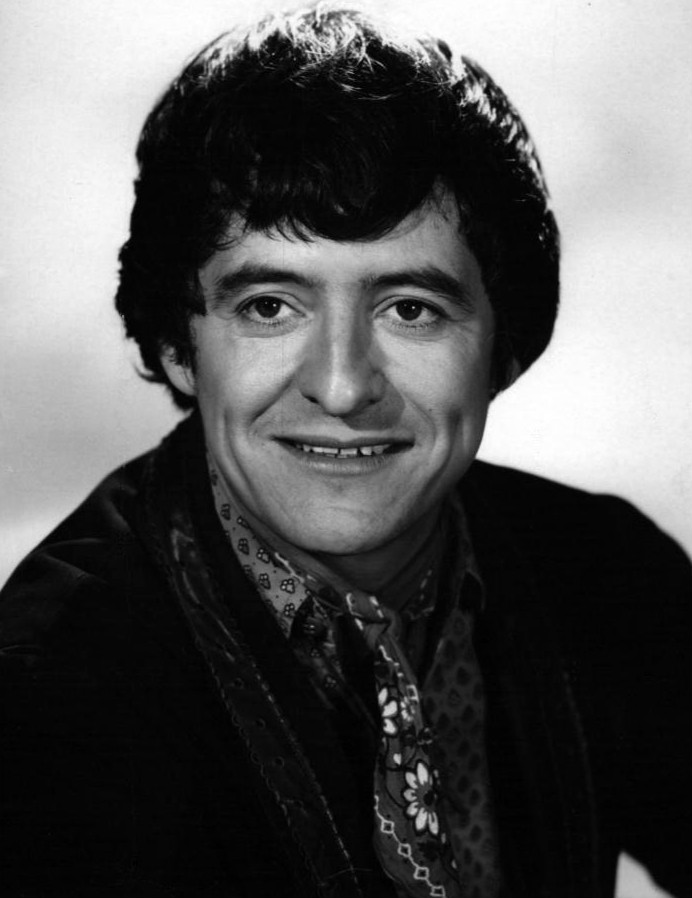
Henry Darrow

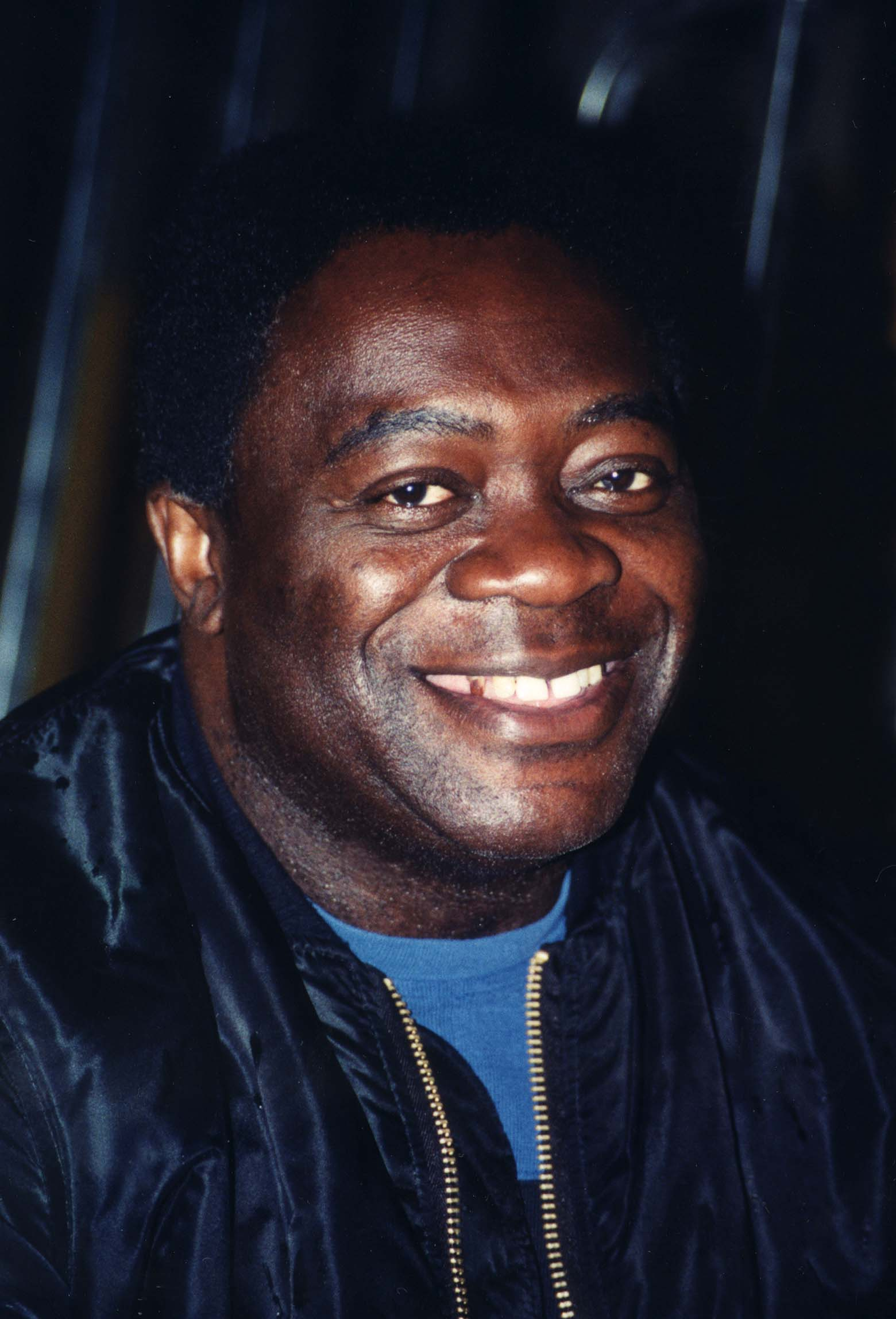
Yaphet Kotto

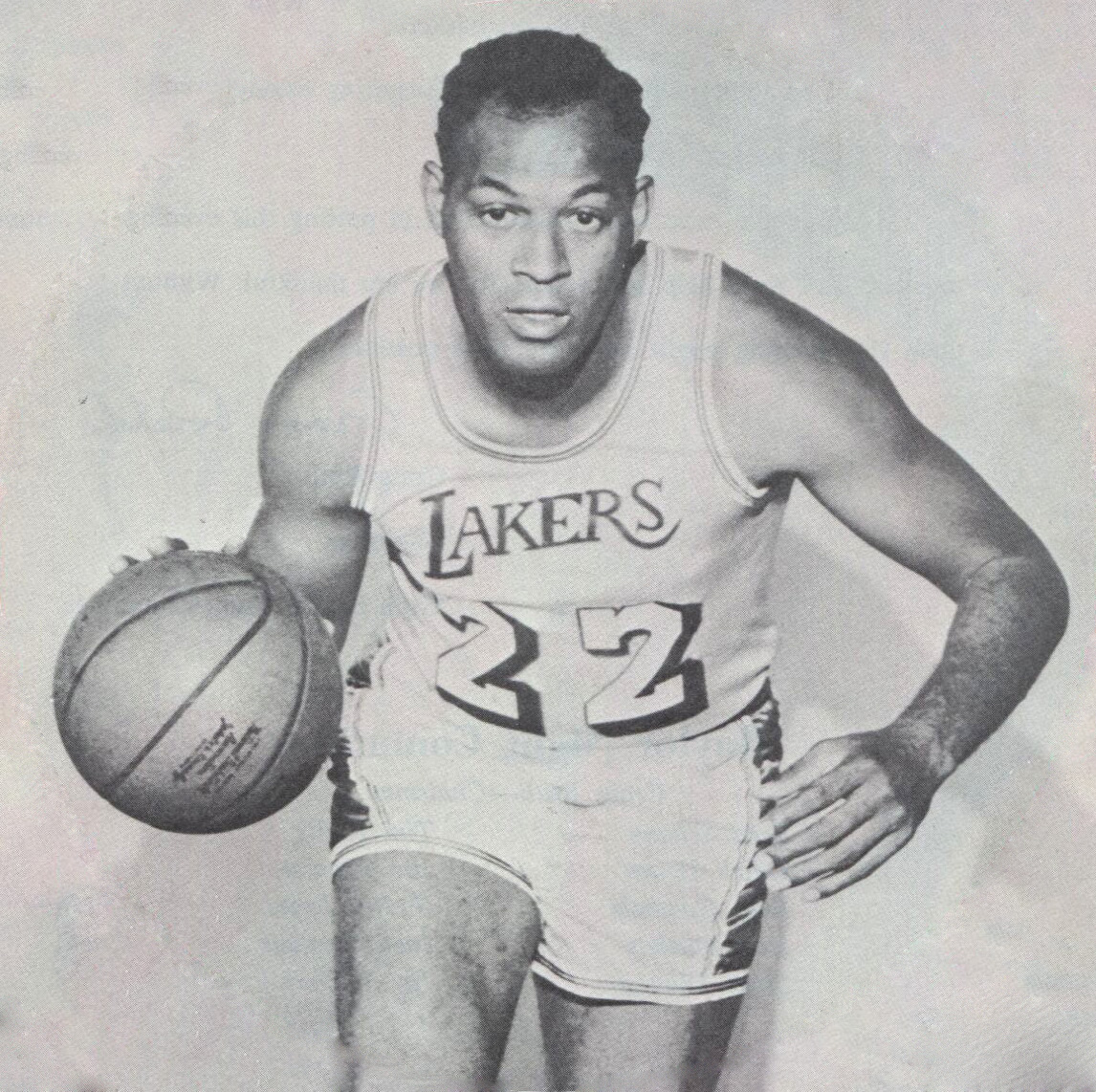
Elgin Baylor

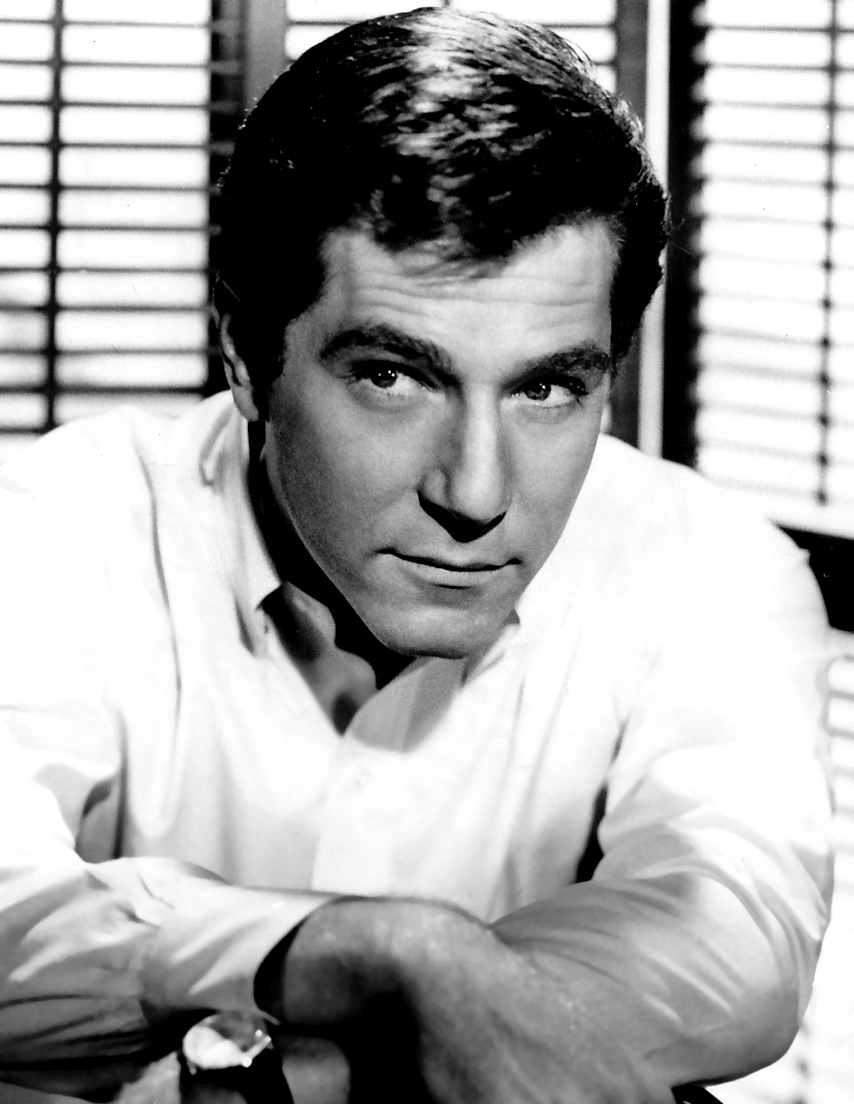
George Segal

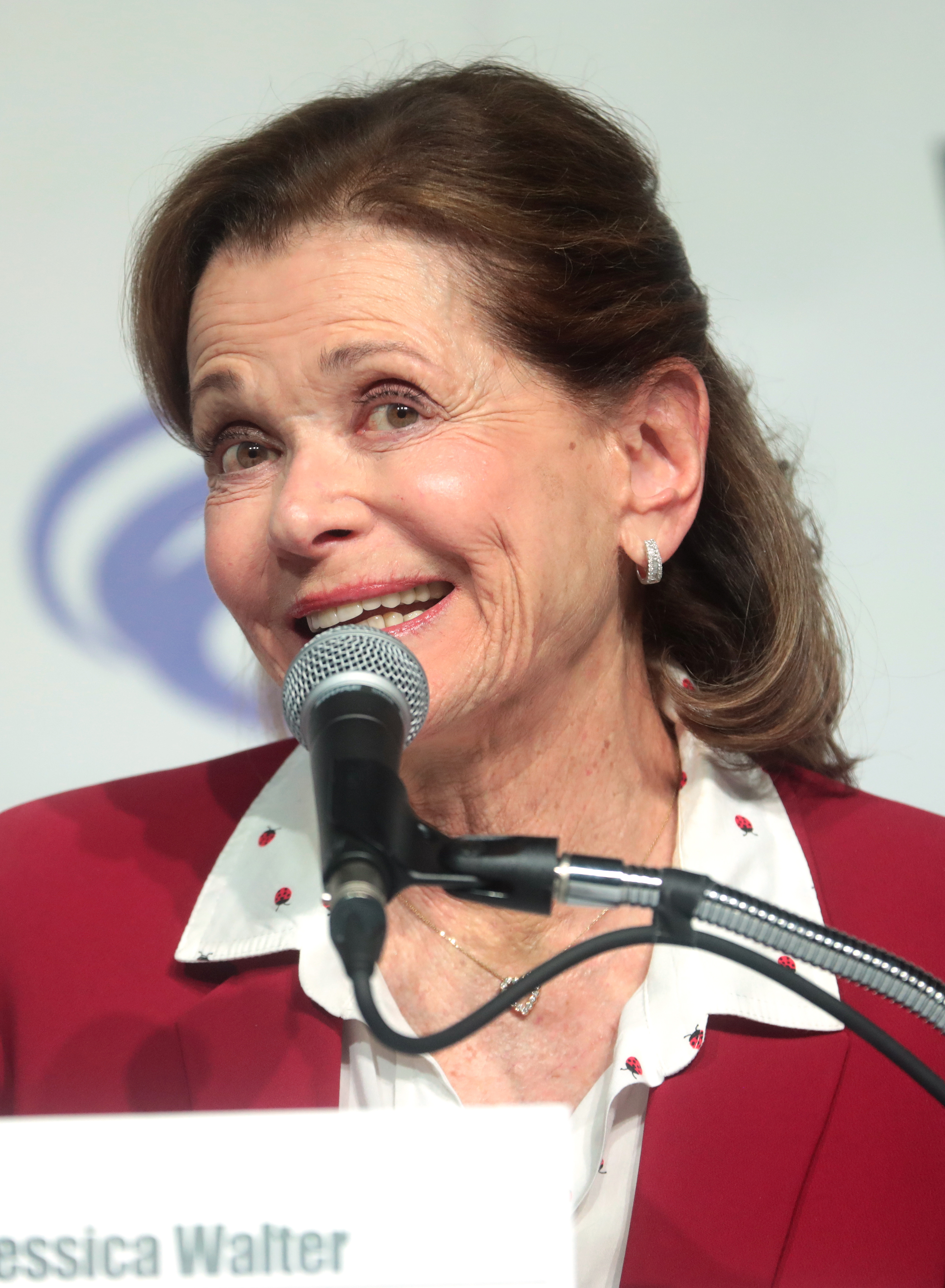
Jessica Walter

- March 1
  - Flex-Deon Blake, 58, pornographic actor (Niggas' Revenge) (b. 1962)
  - Ann Casey, 82, professional wrestler (GCCW, JCP, WWWF) (b. 1938)
  - Vernon Jordan, 85, attorney, business executive, civil rights activist and non-profit executive (National Urban League, United Negro College Fund) (b. 1935)
  - Ralph Peterson Jr., 58, bandleader and jazz drummer (The Jazz Messengers, Out of the Blue) (b. 1962)
- March 2
  - George Bass, 88, archaeologist (b. 1932)
  - Luciano Capicchioni, 74, Sammarinese-American sports agent (b. 1946)
  - Mark Goffeney, 51, musician and guitarist (b. 1969)
  - Louise McBee, 96, politician, member of the Georgia House of Representatives (1993–2005) (b. 1924)
  - Gil Rogers, 87, actor (All My Children, Guiding Light) (b. 1934)
  - Edward C. Waller III, 95, vice admiral (b. 1926)
- March 3
  - Joe Altobelli, 88, baseball player (Cleveland Indians, Minnesota Twins), manager (San Francisco Giants, Baltimore Orioles, Chicago Cubs), coach and color commentator (b. 1932)
  - Marianne Carus, 92, editor and publisher, founder of the children's magazine Cricket (b. 1928)
  - Jim Crockett Jr., 76, professional wrestling promoter (Jim Crockett Promotions), president of the NWA (1980–1982, 1985–1986, 1987–1991) (b. 1944)
  - Kelly Flynn, 66, politician, member of the Montana House of Representatives (2011–2019) (b. 1954)
  - Duffy Jackson, 67, jazz drummer (b. 1953)
  - Earl Renneke, 92, politician, member of the Minnesota Senate (1969–1993) (b. 1928)
  - John Sackett, 76, politician, member of the Alaska House of Representatives (1967–1971) and Senate (1973–1987) (b. 1944)
  - Edward Sandoval, 74, politician, member of the New Mexico House of Representatives (1983–2015) (b. 1947)
- March 4
  - Colby Chandler, 95, business executive, CEO of Kodak (1983–1990) (b. 1925)
  - Barbara Ess, 76, photographer and musician (Disband, The Static, Y Pants) (b. 1944)
  - Heinrich Guggenheimer, 96, German-born Swiss-American mathematician (Washington State University, University of Minnesota, Polytechnic University) (b. 1924)
  - Hugh Newell Jacobsen, 91, architect (b. 1929)
  - Gerald Kogan, 87, jurist, justice (1987–1998) and chief justice (1996–1998) of the Supreme Court of Florida (b. 1933)
  - Moses McCormick, 39, polyglot and YouTuber (b. 1981)
  - Paul McMullen, 49, competition and Olympic middle-distance runner (1996) (b. 1972)
  - Bhaskar Menon, 86, Indian-born American music industry executive, chairman and CEO of EMI Group Limited (b. 1934)
  - Mark Pavelich, 63, ice hockey player (New York Rangers, Minnesota North Stars, San Jose Sharks) and Olympic champion (1980) (b. 1958)
  - David Schindler, 80, American-Canadian limnologist (b. 1940)
  - Jonathan Steinberg, 86, American-born British historian (b. 1934)
- March 5
  - Buddy Colt, 81, professional wrestler and pilot (b. 1936)
  - Paul Foster, 89, playwright, theater director and producer, founding member and first president of the La MaMa Experimental Theatre Club (b. 1931)
  - Don Gile, 85, baseball player (Boston Red Sox) (b. 1935)
  - Frank J. Kelley, 96, politician, Attorney General of the State of Michigan (1961–1999) (b. 1924)
  - Samuel J. Scott, 82, engineer (NASA) (b. 1938)
  - Michael Stanley, 72, musician, singer-songwriter and radio personality (b. 1948)
- March 6
  - Jude Patrick Dougherty, 90, academic administrator, philosopher and editor (b. 1930)
  - Wilhelmina Holladay, 98, art collector and patron (b. 1922)
  - Marion Lewenstein, 93, academic and journalist (b. 1927)
  - Allan J. McDonald, 83, aerospace consultant, engineer and author (b. 1937)
  - Bill O'Connor, 94, football player (Cleveland Browns, Toronto Argonauts) (b. 1926)
  - Carmel Quinn, 95, Irish-American actress and singer (b. 1925)
- March 7
  - Thaddeus M. Buczko, 95, politician and jurist, member of the Massachusetts House of Representatives (1959–1964), Massachusetts State Auditor (1964–1981) (b. 1926)
  - Janis Hape, 62, competition and Olympic swimmer (1976) (b. 1958)
  - Janice McLaughlin, 79, Catholic nun, missionary and human rights activist (b. 1942)
  - Yechezkel Roth, 84/85, Romanian-born American rabbi (b. 1936)
  - Charles Scontras, 91, historian, educator and author (b. 1929)
  - Carl J. Shapiro, 108, businessman and philanthropist, president, chairman of the board and director of VF Corporation (1971–1976) (b. 1913)
  - Frank Thorne, 90, comic book artist and writer (Red Sonja) (b. 1930)
  - Jack Welborn, 88, politician, member of the Michigan House of Representatives (1973–1974) and Senate (1975–1982, 1985–1994) (b. 1932)
- March 8
  - Tom Bland, 83, football player (Wheeling Ironmen, Fort Wayne Warriors, Orlando Panthers, Toronto Argonauts) and coach (b. 1937)
  - Rhéal Cormier, 53, Canadian-American baseball player (St. Louis Cardinals, Boston Red Sox, Montreal Expos, Philadelphia Phillies, Cincinnati Reds) (b. 1967)
  - Leon Gast, 84, documentary film filmmaker (When We Were Kings, The Grateful Dead Movie), cinematographer, director, editor, producer and Oscar winner (1997) (b. 1936)
  - Norton Juster, 91, academic, architect, author and writer (The Phantom Tollbooth, The Dot and the Line, The Hello, Goodbye Window) (b. 1929)
  - Terrence F. McVerry, 77, politician and federal judge, member of the Pennsylvania House of Representatives (1979–1990), judge (2002–2013) and senior judge (since 2013) of the U.S. District Court for the Western District of Pennsylvania (b. 1943)
  - Norm Sherry, 89, baseball player (Los Angeles Dodgers, New York Mets), manager (California Angels) and coach (b. 1931)
  - Mark Whitecage, 83, jazz musician and reedist (b. 1937)
- March 9
  - Joan Walsh Anglund, 95, children's author, illustrator and poet (b. 1926)
  - Boston Harbor, 26, Thoroughbred racehorse (b. 1994)
  - Richard Driehaus, 78, businessman, fund manager and philanthropist, founder, chairman and chief investment officer of Driehaus Capital Management LLC. (b. 1942)
  - Walter LaFeber, 87, historian (Cornell University) (b. 1933)
  - James Levine, 77, conductor and pianist (Metropolitan Opera) (b. 1943)
  - Michael McDermott, 67, politician and real estate broker, Libertarian Party candidate for Governor of New York (2014) (b. 1953)
  - Biff McGuire, 94, actor (Alfred Hitchcock Presents, The Thomas Crown Affair, Serpico) (b. 1926)
  - Roger Mudd, 93, television news anchor, broadcast journalist and correspondent (CBS Evening News, Meet the Press, NBC Nightly News) (b. 1928)
  - Steve Ortmayer, 77, football coach (Kansas City Chiefs, Oakland Raiders, Green Bay Packers) and executive (San Diego Chargers, Los Angeles Rams) (b. 1944)
  - Cliff Simon, 58, South African-born American actor (Stargate SG-1), athlete and pilot (b. 1962)
  - Jim Snyder, 88, baseball player (Minnesota Twins) and manager (Seattle Mariners) (b. 1932)
  - Blanquita Valenti, 87, politician (b. 1933/1934)
- March 10
  - Bruce Abel, 84, bass singer (b. 1936)
  - Eugene Hughes, 86, academic administrator, president of Northern Arizona University (1979–1993) and Wichita State University (1993–1998) (b. 1934)
  - Robert Middlekauff, 91, historian (University of California, Berkeley) (b. 1929)
  - Scott Pilarz, 61, Jesuit academic administrator, president of Marquette University (2011–2013) and the University of Scranton (2003–2011, since 2017) (b. 1959)
  - Albert Resis, 99, historian (Northern Illinois University) (b. 1921)
  - Stephen Scott, 76, composer (b. 1944)
  - Joe Tait, 83, sports broadcaster (Cleveland Cavaliers, Cleveland Indians, Cleveland Rockers) (b. 1937)
- March 11
  - Ray Campi, 86, rock and roll musician and double bassist (b. 1934)
  - Carola B. Eisenberg, 103, Argentine-American psychiatrist (b. 1917)
  - Jewlia Eisenberg, 50, singer (Charming Hostess), bassist, cantor, composer and educator (b. 1970/1971)
  - Lin Emery, 94, visual artist (b. 1926)
  - Sally Grossman, 81, model and music label executive (Bearsville Records) (b. 1939)
  - Peter W. Hall, 72, attorney and federal judge, United States Attorney for the District of Vermont (2001–2004), judge (2004–2021) and senior judge (since 2021) of the U.S. Court of Appeals for the Second Circuit (b. 1948)
  - Curtis Lovejoy, 63, competition and Paralympic swimmer, Paralympic champion (2000) (b. 1957)
  - Isidore Mankofsky, 89, cinematographer (The Muppet Movie, Somewhere in Time, The Jazz Singer) (b. 1931)
  - Skip Mercier, 66, costume, puppet and set designer (b. 1954)
  - Luis Palau, 86, Argentine-born American evangelist and author (b. 1934)
  - George Reihner, 65, football player (Houston Oilers) (b. 1955)
  - Jack Sandner, 79, business executive (Chicago Mercantile Exchange) and community leader (b. 1941)
- March 12
  - Robina Asti, 99, flight instructor and advocate for women's and transgender rights (b. 1921)
  - Gaynor Cawley, 79, politician, member of the Pennsylvania House of Representatives (1981–2006) (b. 1941)
  - Ronald DeFeo Jr., 69, mass murderer (b. 1951)
  - Daphne Gail Fautin, 74, professor of invertebrate zoology (University of Kansas) (b. 1946)
  - Andrew Majda, 72, mathematician (New York University) (b. 1949)
  - John Albert Nordberg, 94, federal judge, judge (1982–1994) and senior judge (since 1994) of the U.S. District Court for the Northern District of Illinois (b. 1926)
  - Dion Payton, 70, blues guitarist and singer (b. 1950)
  - Tapan Kumar Sarkar, 72, Indian-American electrical engineer (Syracuse University) (b. 1948)
  - Bob Walkup, politician, 84, Mayor of Tucson (1999–2011) (b. 1936)
- March 13 – Marvin Hagler, 66, boxer (b. 1954)
- March 15
  - Stephen Bechtel Jr., 95, businessman and engineer (b. 1925)
  - Henry Darrow, 87, character actor of stage and film (b. 1933)
  - Calvin Jackson, 49, professional football player in the NFL (b. 1972)
  - Yaphet Kotto, 81, actor (b. 1939)
- March 16 – Amaranth Ehrenhalt, 93, painter, sculptor, and writer (b. 1928)
- March 17
  - Dick Hoyt, 80, athletic competitor. He competed with his son Rick, who has cerebral palsy, in marathons and Ironman Triathlons (b. 1940)
  - Freddie Redd, 92, hard-bop pianist and composer (b. 1928)
- March 18
  - J. Michael Boardman, 83, British mathematician specializing in algebraic and differential topology (b. 1938)
  - Richard Gilliland, 71, television and movie actor (b. 1950)
  - Paul Jackson, bassist and composer (b. 1947)
  - W. Kent Taylor, 65, businessman; founder and CEO of the Texas Roadhouse restaurant chain (b. 1955)
  - Bill Young, 74, football coach at the high school, college, and professional levels (b. 1946)
- March 19
  - Andy Haman, 54, professional bodybuilder and actor (b. 1966)
  - Melvin L. Kohn, 92, sociologist and past president of the American Sociological Association (b. 1928)
  - Gary Leib, 65, underground cartoonist, animator, and musician (b. 1955)
  - Glynn Lunney, 84, aerospace engineer (b. 1936)
  - Barry Orton, 62, actor and professional wrestler (b. 1958)
  - Dan Sartain, 39, musician (b. 1981)
- March 20
  - Fred Wyant, 86, professional football player and NFL official (b. 1934)
  - Dale E. Wolf, 96, businessman and politician (b. 1924)
- March 22 – Elgin Baylor, 86, basketball player, coach and executive (b. 1934)
- March 23
  - Connie Bradley, 75, music executive (ASCAP) (b. 1945)
  - Benny Dees, 86, college basketball coach (b. 1934)
  - Ethel Gabriel, 99, Grammy winning record producer and music executive (b. 1921)
  - Don Heffington, 70, drummer (Lone Justice, Watkins Family Hour) (b. 1950)
  - George Segal, 87, actor (b. 1934)
  - Houston Tumlin, 28, child actor (Talladega Nights: The Ballad of Ricky Bobby) and United States Army veteran (b. 1992)
  - Granville Waiters, 60, professional basketball player (b. 1961)
- March 24
  - Morris Dickstein, 81, literary scholar (b. 1940)
  - Jessica Walter, 80, actress (b. 1941)
- March 25
  - Stan Albeck, 89, college and professional basketball coach (b. 1931)
  - Rick Azar, 91, broadcaster (WKBW-TV) (b. 1929)
  - Bill Brock, 90, politician, U.S. House of Representatives, U.S. Senate, and U.S. Secretary of Labor (b. 1930)
  - Bobby Brown, 96, professional baseball player, executive, and physician (b. 1924)
  - Beverly Cleary, 104, children's author (b. 1916)
  - Joe Cunningham, 89, professional baseball player (b. 1931)
  - Larry McMurtry, 84, Academy Award-winning novelist and screenwriter (Lonesome Dove, The Last Picture Show, Brokeback Mountain) (b. 1936)
  - Gail Phillips, 76, politician, member of the Alaska House of Representatives (b. 1944)
  - Paul W. Whear, 95, composer, conductor, double-bassist and music educator (b. 1925)
- March 26
  - Mike Bell, 46, professional baseball player and coach (b. 1974)
  - Paul Polansky, 79, writer and Romani activist (b. 1942)
- March 27
  - Howard Schnellenberger, 87, college and professional football coach (b. 1934)
  - Leon Hale, 99, journalist and author (Houston Chronicle, Houston Post) (b. 1921)
- March 28 – Joseph Edward Duncan, 58, serial killer and child molester (b. 1963)
- March 30 – G. Gordon Liddy, 90, lawyer, FBI agent, talk show host, actor, and one of the seven conspirators convicted of the 1972 Watergate burglary (b. 1930)
- March 31
  - Paul Feinman, 61, attorney, associate judge of the New York Court of Appeals (2017–2021) (b. 1960)
  - Ron Greene, 82, college basketball coach (b. 1938)
  - Cleve Hall, 61, special effects artist (Metalstorm: The Destruction of Jared-Syn, Alienator), make-up artist and actor (b.1959)
  - Jerry McGee, 77, golfer (b. 1943)
  - Mary Mullarkey, 77, jurist, member (1987–2010) and chief justice (1998–2010) of the Colorado Supreme Court (b. 1943)
  - Ken Reitz, 69, MLB baseball player (b. 1951)
  - Gregory K. Scott, 72, state judge, member of the Colorado Supreme Court (1992–2000) (b. 1948)

== April ==
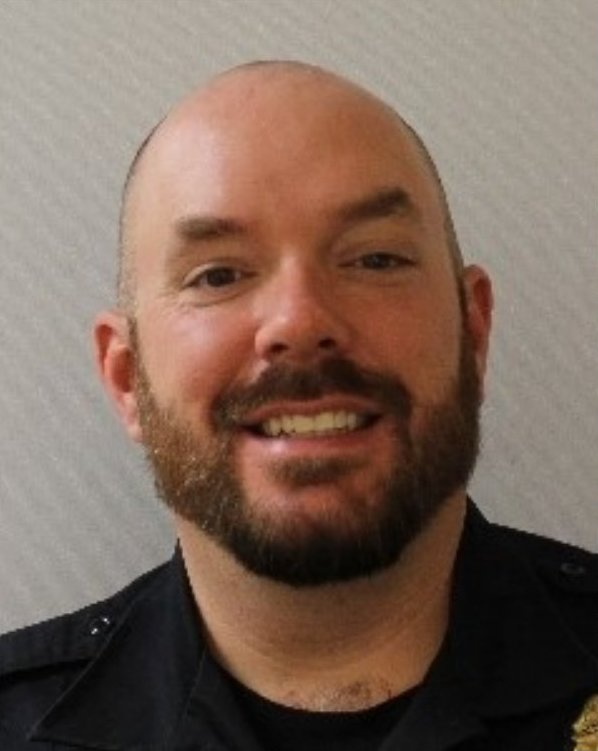
William Evans

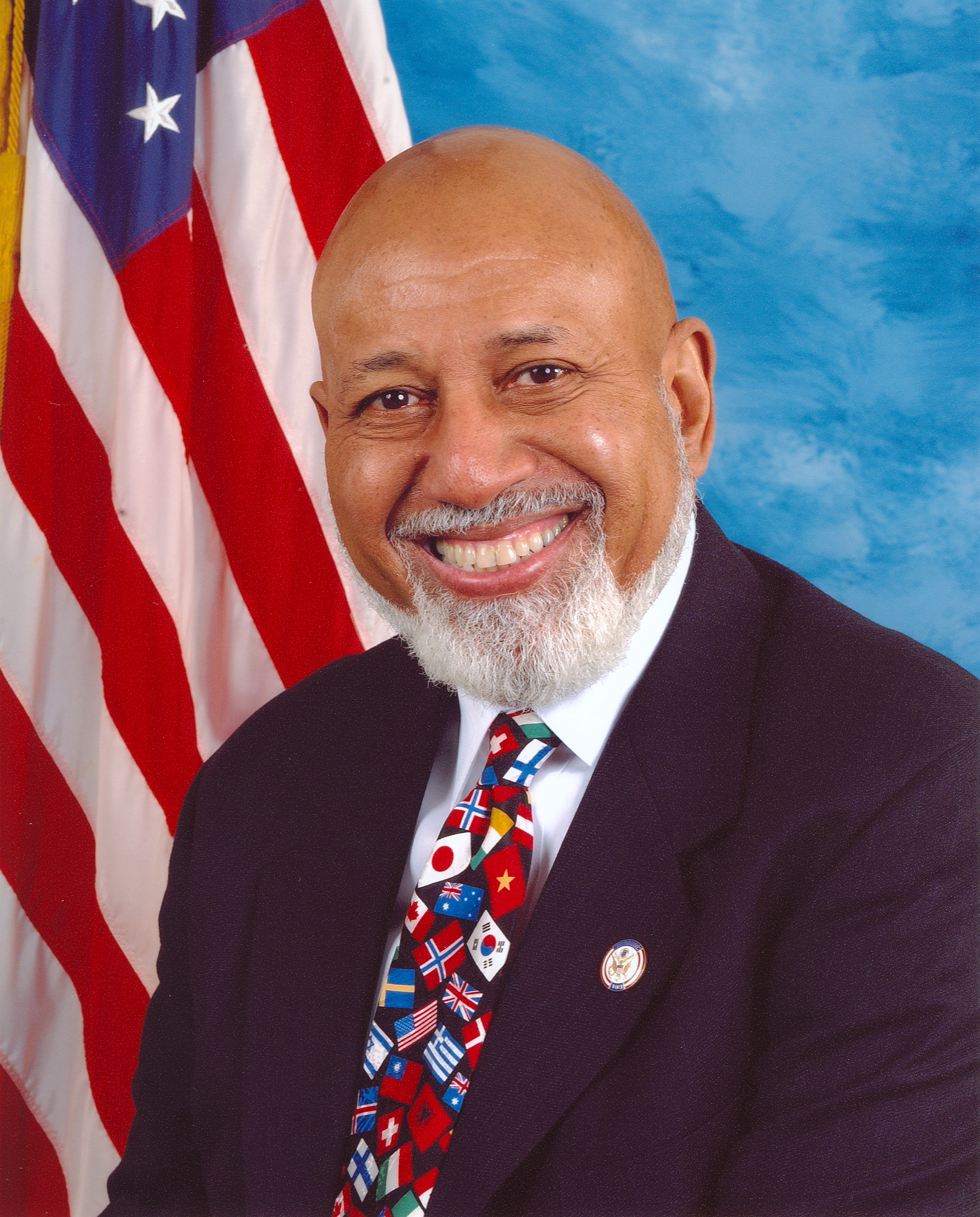
Alcee Hastings

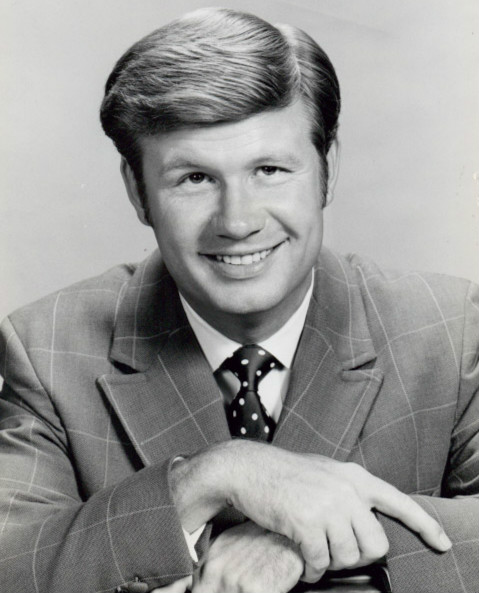
James Hampton

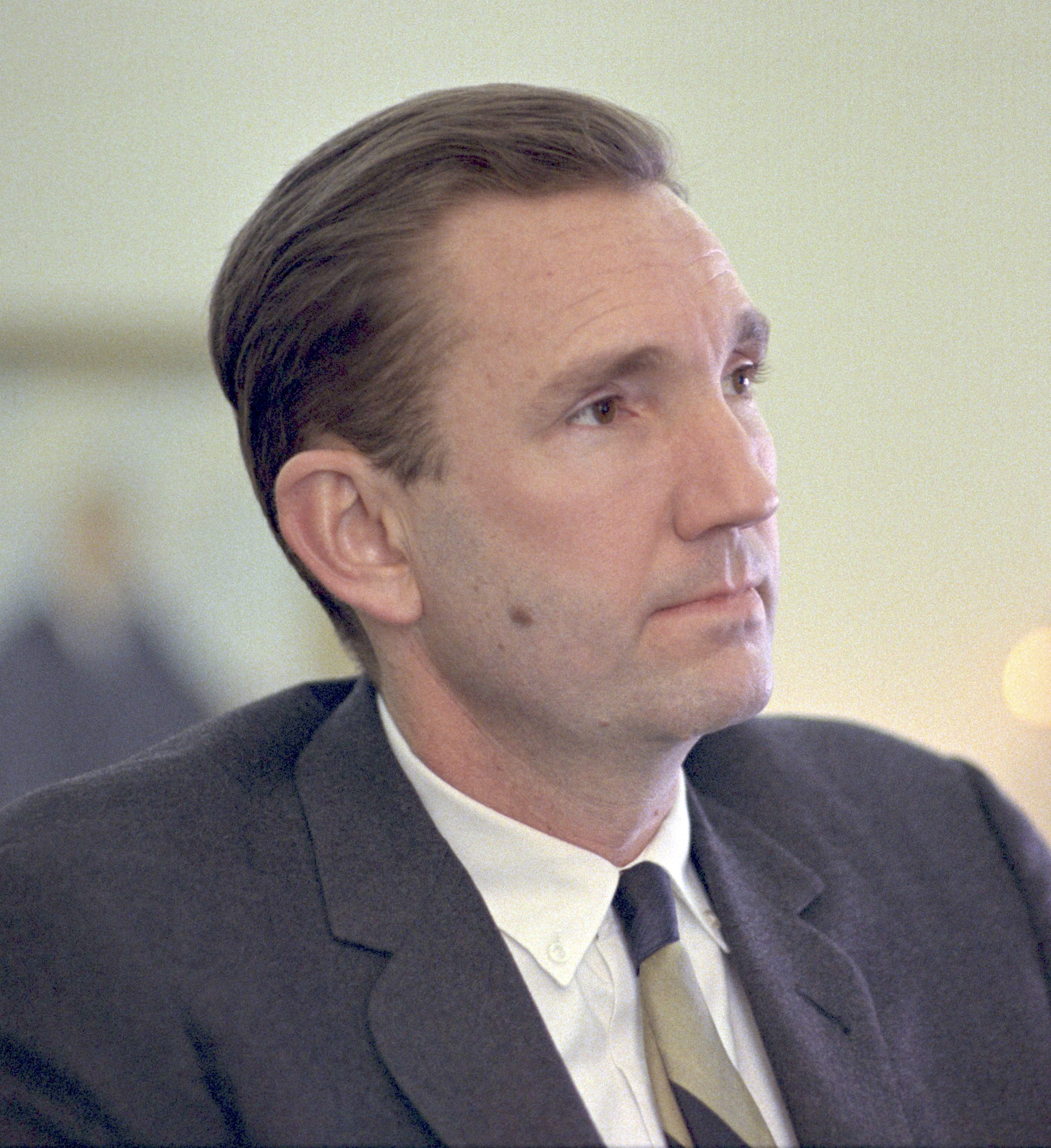
Ramsey Clark

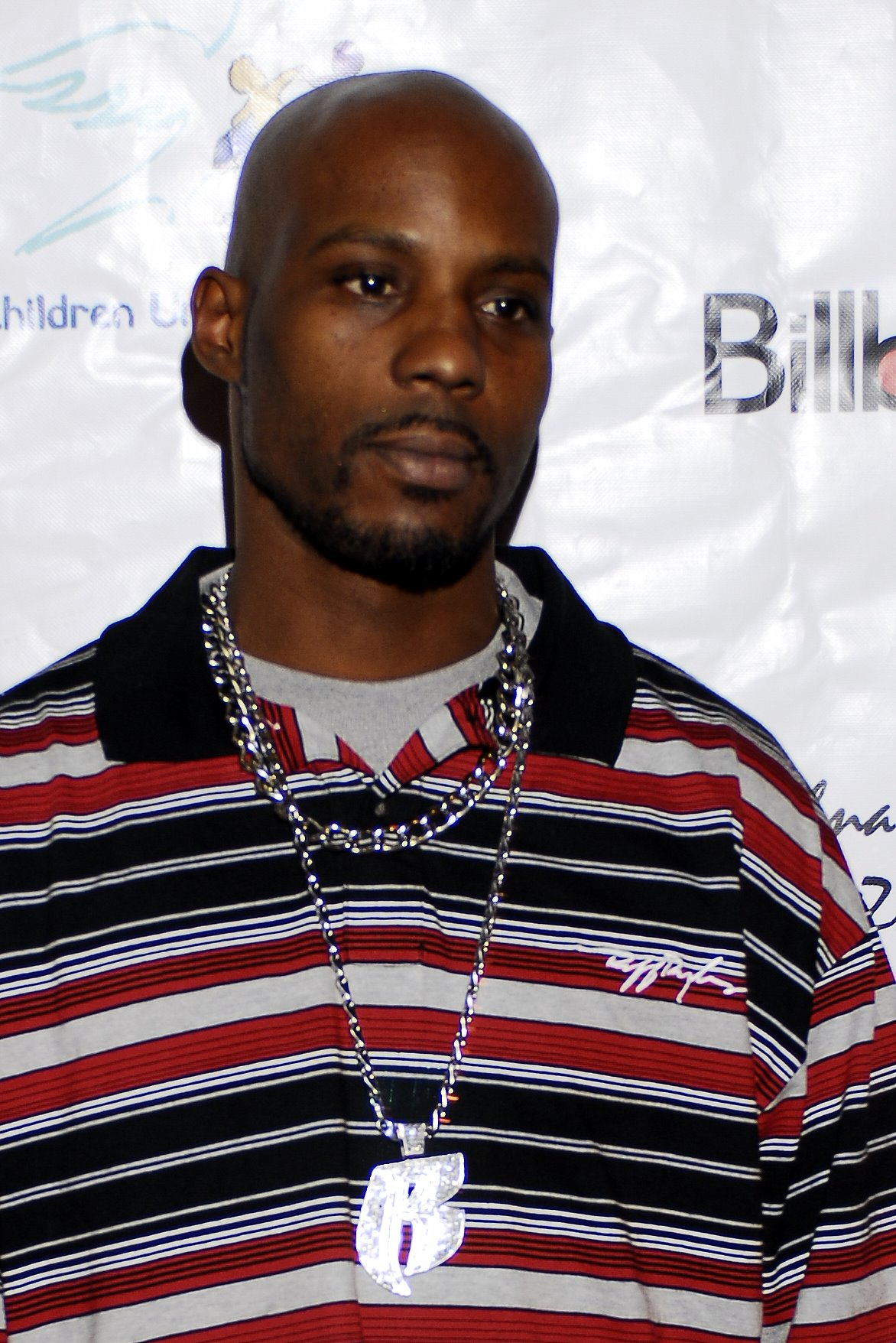
DMX

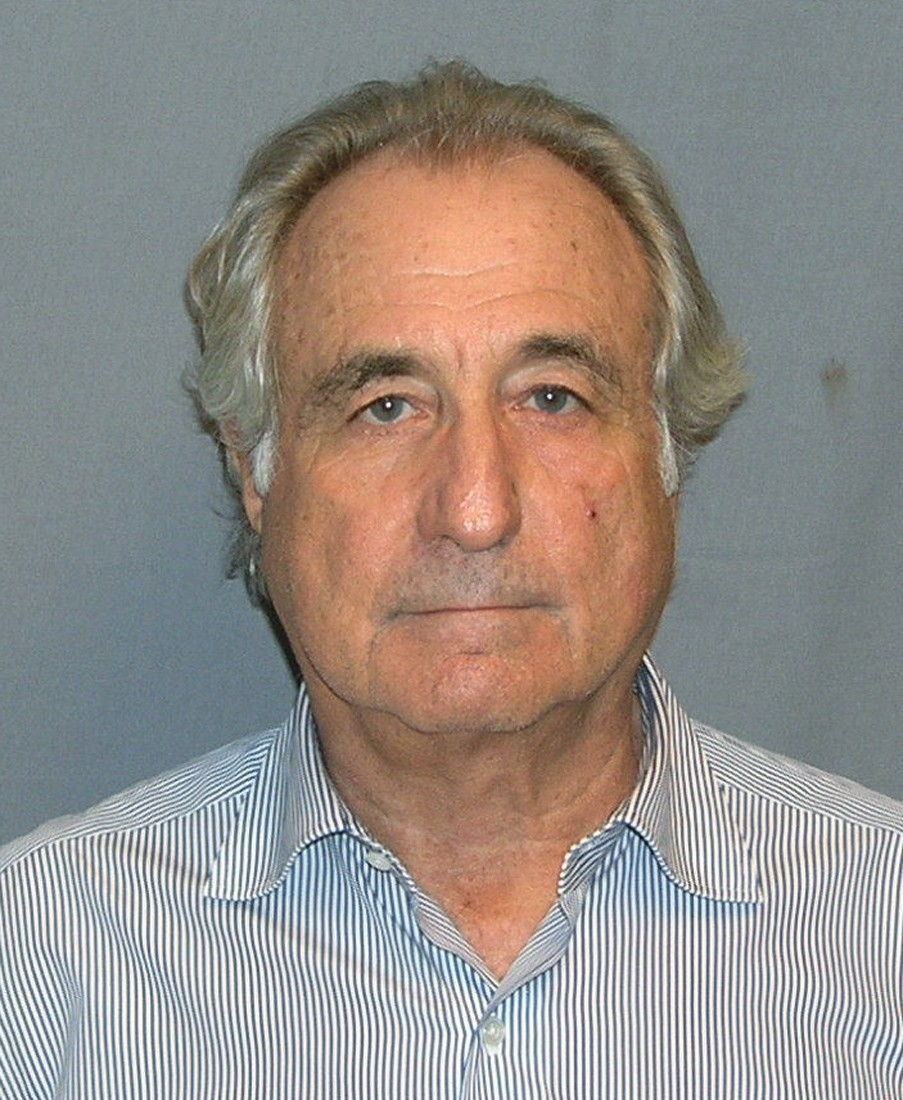
Bernie Madoff

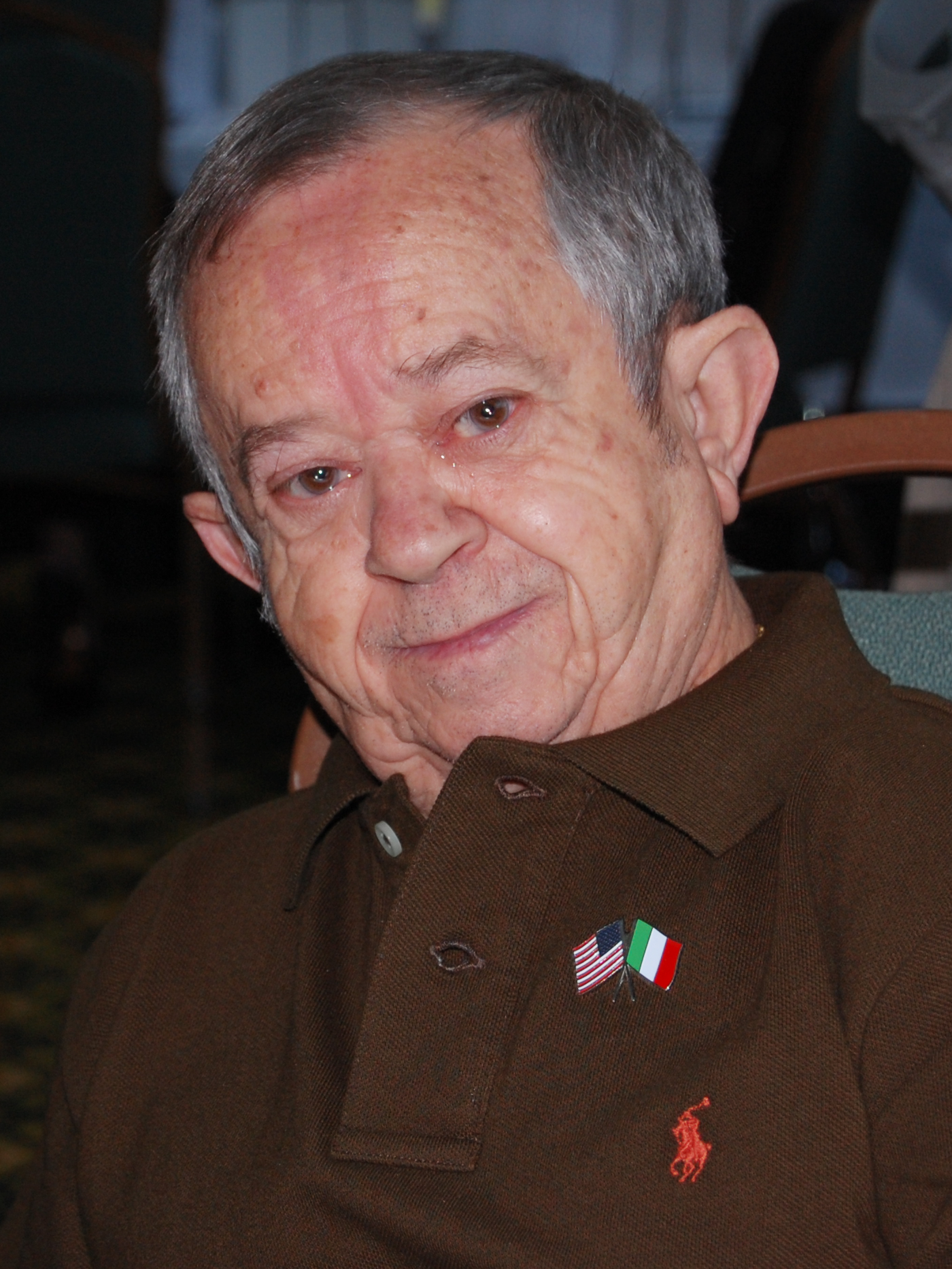
Felix Silla

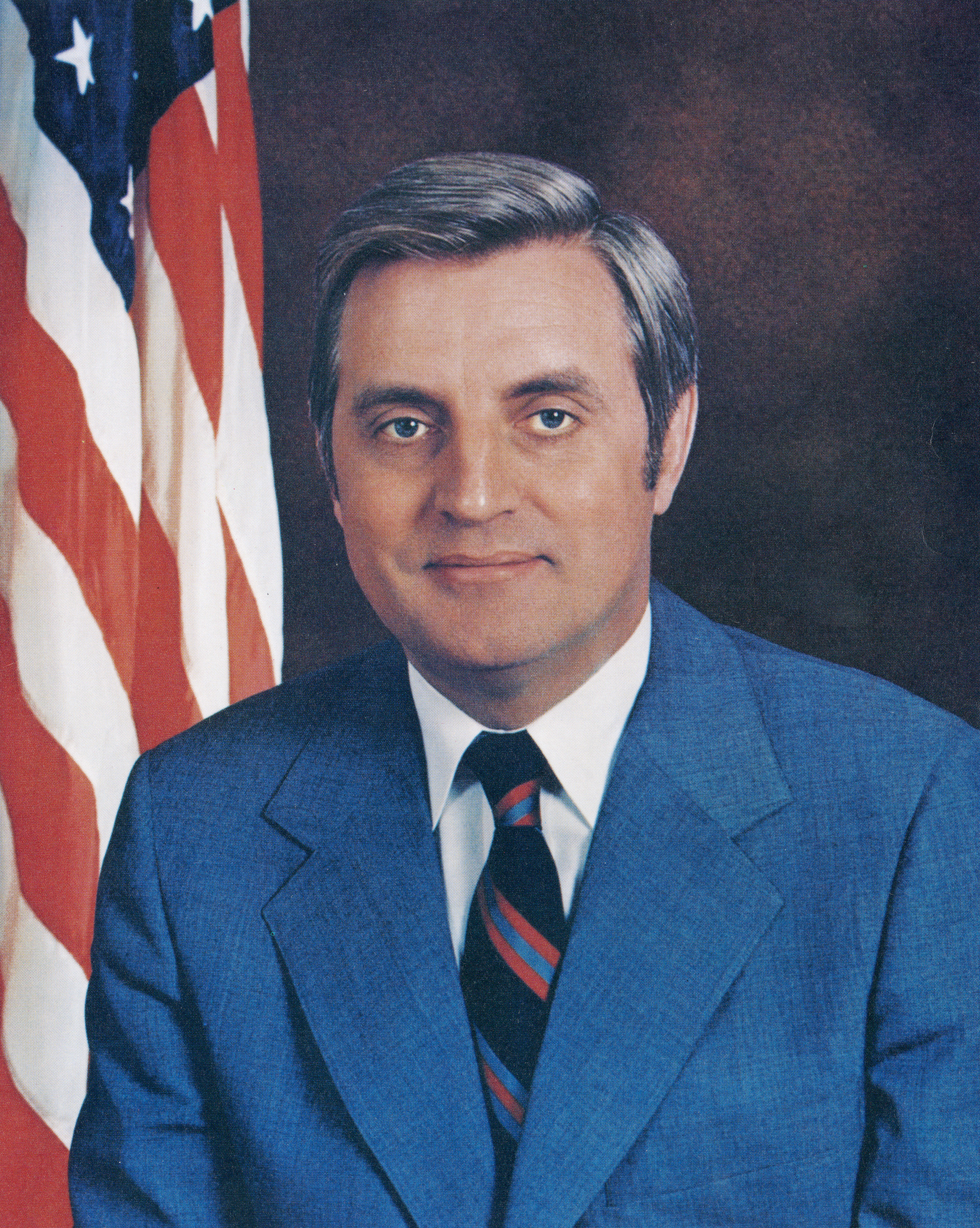
Walter Mondale

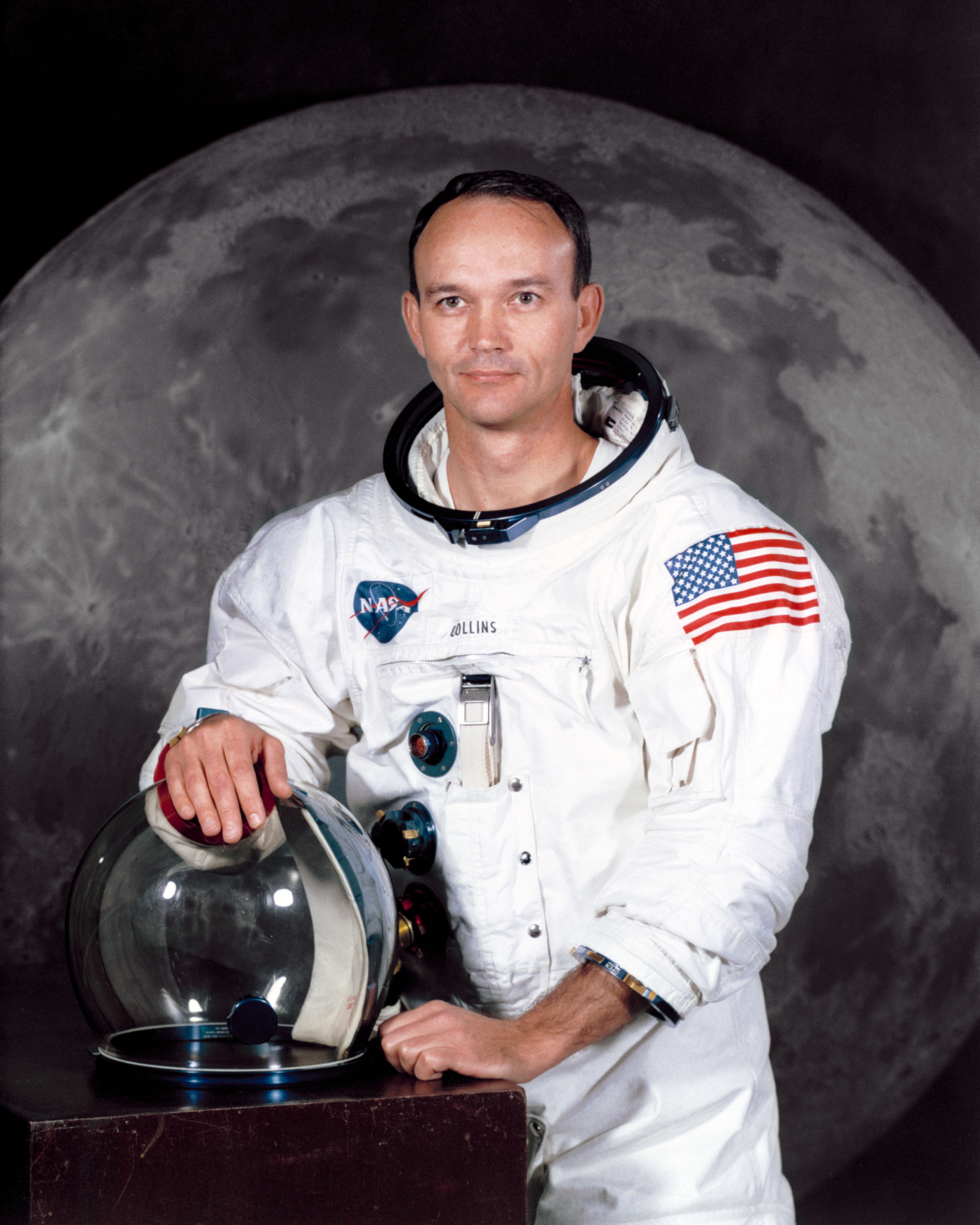
Michael Collins

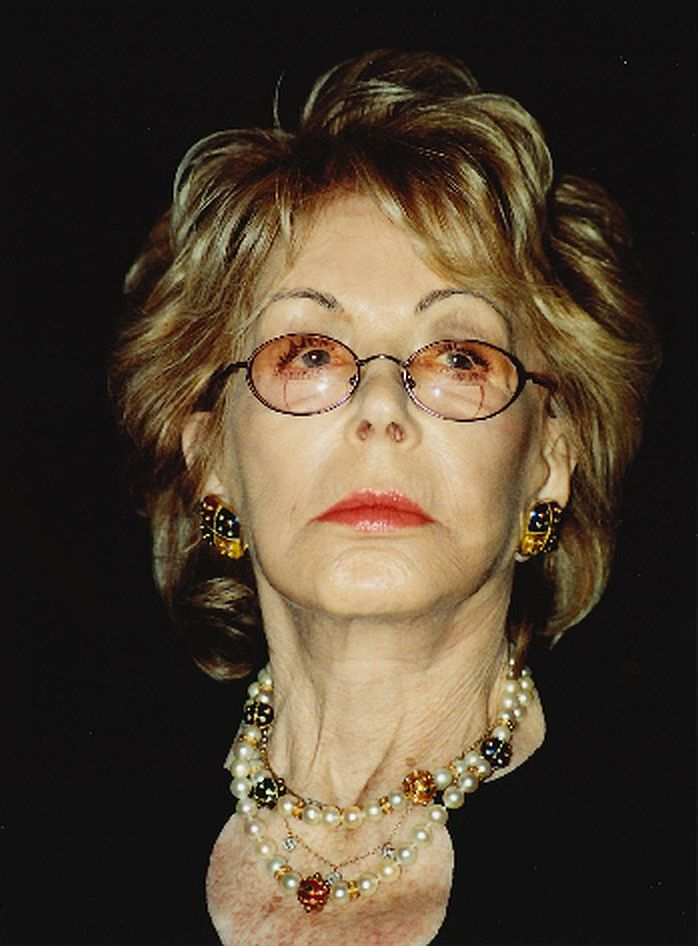
Anne Buydens

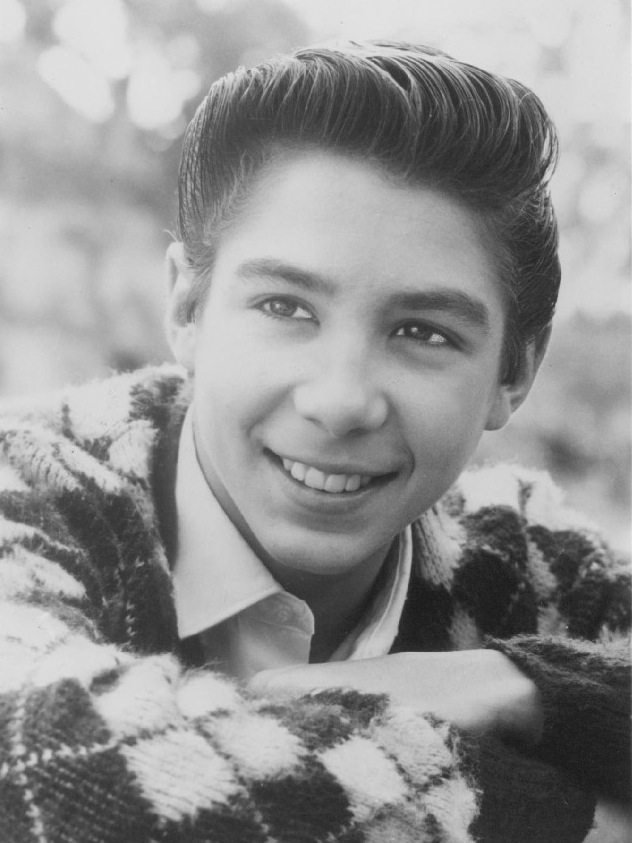
Johnny Crawford

- April 1
  - Lee Aaker, 77, actor (The Adventures of Rin Tin Tin, Hondo, Mister Scoutmaster), producer, carpenter and ski instructor, (b. 1943)
  - Martha Lou Gadsden, 91, chef and restaurateur (Martha Lou's Kitchen), (b. 1930)
  - Gerald Irons, 73, football player (Oakland Raiders, Cleveland Browns), (b. 1947)
- April 2
  - April, 20, reticulated giraffe, (b. 2000)
  - Morris "B.B." Dickerson, 71, funk bassist and singer (War), (b. 1949)
  - William Evans, 41, (police officer), killed in the April Capitol attack, (b. 1980)
  - Pete Giesen, 88, politician, member of the Virginia House of Delegates (1964–1996), (b. 1932)
  - Arthur Kopit, 83, playwright (Indians, Wings, Nine), (b. 1937)
  - Clara LaMore, 94, competition and Olympic swimmer (1948), (b. 1926)
  - Quindon Tarver, 38, singer and songwriter (b. 1982)
  - Gordon Weaver, 84, novelist and short story writer, (b. 1937)
- April 3
  - Kathie Coblentz, 73, author and librarian, (b. 1947)
  - Jill Corey, 85, singer ("Love Me to Pieces", "Let It Be Me"), (b. 1935)
  - Mark Elliott, 81, voice-over artist, (b. 1939)
  - Gloria Henry, 98, actress (Dennis the Menace, Miss Grant Takes Richmond, Rancho Notorious), (b. 1923)
  - Carl Hodges, 84, atmospheric physicist and climate scientist, (b. 1937)
  - James B. Holderman, 85, academic administrator, president of the University of South Carolina (1977–1990), (b. 1936)
  - Herb Johnson, 92, football player (New York Giants), (b. 1928)
  - Brother Stair, 87, Pentecostal evangelical pastor and radio preacher (The Overcomer Ministry), (b. 1933)
  - Stan Stephens, 91, Canadian-born American politician, member (1969–1985) and president (1983–1985) of the Montana Senate, Governor of Montana (1989–1993), (b. 1929)
- April 4
  - Thomas D. Brock, 94, microbiologist, (b. 1926)
  - Elizabeth Davis, 70, trade unionist, (b. 1930/1931)
  - Jean Dupuy, 95, French-born American artist, (b. 1925)
  - Ralph Schuckett, 73, rock keyboardist (Utopia, Todd Rundgren) and composer (Pokémon: The First Movie), (b. 1948)
- April 5
  - Philip K. Chapman, 86, Australian-born American astronaut (NASA Astronaut Group 6), (b. 1935)
  - Jon Michael Dunn, 79, philosopher (Wayne State University, Yale University, Indiana University Bloomington), (b. 1941)
  - Robert Fletcher, 98, costume and set designer (Star Trek, Fright Night, The Last Starfighter), (b. 1922)
  - Joye Hummel, 97, comic book ghostwriter (Wonder Woman), (b. 1924)
  - Frank Jacobs, 91, comics writer (Mad), (b. 1929)
  - Bill Markham, 98, politician, member of the Oregon House of Representatives (1969–1993), (b. 1922)
  - Gene Mullin, 83, politician, member of the California State Assembly (2002–2008) and Mayor of South San Francisco (1997–1998, 2001–2002), (b. 1937)
  - Marshall Sahlins, 90, anthropologist (Sahlins–Obeyesekere debate), (b. 1930)
  - Wilber Shirley, 90, restaurateur (Wilber's Barbecue), (b. 1930)
- April 6
  - Alice Headley Chandler, 95, Hall of Fame horsebreeder (Sir Ivor) and racing stable owner, (b. 1926)
  - Midwin Charles, 47, lawyer and legal analyst (CNN, MSNBC) (b. 1973)
  - Charles H. Coolidge, 99, technical sergeant and Medal of Honor recipient, (b. 1921)
  - Reese Erlich, 73, author and journalist, (b. 1947)
  - Paul Greenberg, 84, journalist (Arkansas Democrat-Gazette) and Pulitzer Prize winner (1969), (b. 1937)
  - Alcee Hastings, 84, jurist and politician, judge of Florida's 17th Circuit Court (1977–1979), judge of the United States District Court for the Southern District of Florida (1979–1989), member of the U.S. House of Representatives (since 1993), (b. 1936)
  - Joe Krebs, 78, television news anchor, (b. 1943)
  - Al Mengert, 91, golfer, (b. 1928)
  - Walter Olkewicz, 72, actor (Grace Under Fire, Twin Peaks, The Client), (b. 1948)
  - Paul Rabinow, 76, anthropologist (University of California, Berkeley), (b. 1944)
  - Bobby Schilling, 57, politician, member of the U.S. House of Representatives (2011–2013), (b. 1964)
  - Sonny Simmons, 87, jazz musician and saxophonist, (b. 1933)
  - Gene Youngblood, 78, media theorist and writer (Expanded Cinema), (b. 1942)
- April 7
  - Anne Beatts, 74, humorist, comedy and television writer (National Lampoon, Saturday Night Live, Square Pegs), (b. 1947)
  - James Hampton, 84, actor (F Troop, The Longest Yard, Teen Wolf) and director, (b. 1936)
  - Peter Manso, 80, author, writer and journalist, (b. 1940)
  - Kai Nielsen, 94, philosopher (University of Calgary), (b. 1926)
  - Bill Owens, 85, songwriter, (b. 1935)
  - Wayne Peterson, 93, composer, pianist and educator, (b. 1927)
  - Jack Smith, 85, baseball player (Los Angeles Dodgers, Milwaukee Braves), (b. 1935)
  - Howard Weitzman, 81, lawyer, (b. 1939)
- April 8
  - Phillip Adams, 32, football player (San Francisco 49ers, New England Patriots, Seattle Seahawks, Oakland Raiders, New York Jets, Atlanta Falcons) and mass murderer (2021 Rock Hill shooting), (b. 1988)
  - Margaret Wander Bonanno, 71, science fiction writer (Dwellers in the Crucible, Strangers from the Sky), ghostwriter and publisher, (b. 1950)
  - Lee Delaney, 49, business executive, CEO of BJ's Wholesale Club, (b. 1971/1972)
  - Conn Findlay, 90, Olympic rower and sailor, (b. 1930)
  - Red Mack, 83, football player (Pittsburgh Steelers, Philadelphia Eagles, Atlanta Falcons, Green Bay Packers), (b. 1937)
  - John Naisbitt, 92, author, futurologist and public speaker, (b. 1929)
  - Alan Pastrana, 76, football player (Denver Broncos) and coach (Anne Arundel Community College, Severn School), (b. 1944)
  - Richard Rush, 91, film director (Freebie and the Bean, The Stunt Man, Color of Night), scriptwriter and producer, (b. 1929)
- April 9
  - Ramsey Clark, 93, activist, lawyer and federal government official, attorney general (1966–1969) and deputy attorney general (1965–1967), (b. 1927)
  - DMX, 50, rapper ("Party Up (Up in Here)", "X Gon' Give It to Ya"), songwriter and actor (Cradle 2 the Grave), (b. 1970)
  - Sandra J. Feuerstein, 75, federal judge, judge (2003–2015) and senior judge (since 2015) of the U.S. District Court for the Eastern District of New York (since 2003), (b. 1946)
  - Red Gendron, 63, ice hockey coach (Albany River Rats, Indiana Ice, Maine Black Bears), (b. 1957)
  - Charles Jenkins, 69, Episcopal prelate, 10th Bishop of the Episcopal Diocese of Louisiana (1998–2009), (b. 1951)
  - Jack Minker, 93, computer scientist (University of Maryland, College Park), (b. 1927)
  - Judith Reisman, 84, author, (b. 1935)
- April 10
  - Edwin E. Aguilar, 46, Salvadoran-born American animator and director (G.I. Joe, The Simpsons, Transformers), (b. 1974)
  - LaDonna Brave Bull Allard, 64, Lakota historian and Native American rights activist (Dakota Access Pipeline protests), (b. 1956)
  - Quinton Claunch, 99, musician, songwriter, record label owner and producer, (b. 1921)
  - Roger Kasperson, 83, geographer (Clark University), (b. 1938)
  - Bob Petric, 56, guitarist (Thomas Jefferson Slave Apartments), (b. 1964) (death announced on this date)
  - Bob Porter, 80, Hall of Fame record producer, discographer, writer and radio broadcaster, (b. 1940)
  - M. Richard Rose, 88, academic administrator, president of Alfred University (1974–1978) and the Rochester Institute of Technology (1979–1992), (b. 1933)
  - Lin Whitworth, 87, politician, member of the Idaho Senate (1994–2000), (b. 1933)
- April 11
  - Todd J. Campbell, 64, federal judge, judge (1995–2016), chief judge (2005–2012) and senior judge (since 2016) of the U.S. District Court for the Middle District of Tennessee, (b. 1956)
  - Kas Kastner, 92, motorsports manager, racing driver, car builder and author, (b. 1928)
  - Joseph Siravo, 66, actor (The Sopranos, American Crime Story, Oslo), producer and educator, (b. 1955)
  - Gerren Taylor, 30, television personality (Baldwin Hills, America the Beautiful), (b. 1990)
  - John Williamson, 83, British-born American economist (Massachusetts Institute of Technology, Princeton University), (b. 1937)
  - Daunte Wright, 20, arrestee (Killing of Daunte Wright), (b. 2000)
- April 12
  - Thomas E. Delahanty II, 75, jurist and lawyer, judge (1983–2010) and chief judge (1990–1995) of the Maine Superior Court, United States Attorney for the District of Maine (1980–1981, 2010–2017), (b. 1945)
  - John Pelan, 63, author, editor and publisher, (b. 1957)
  - Paull Shin, 85, politician, member of the Washington House of Representatives (1993–1995) and Senate (1999–2014), (b. 1935)
  - Martin Wachs, 79, urban planner (University of California, Los Angeles, University of California, Berkeley), (b. 1941)
- April 13
  - Harold Bradley Jr., 91, football player (Cleveland Browns, Philadelphia Eagles) and actor (Seven Rebel Gladiators) (b. 1929)
  - Bobby Leonard, 88, Hall of Fame basketball player (Los Angeles Lakers, Washington Wizards) and coach (Indiana Pacers) (b. 1932)
- April 14
  - Hank Huckaby, 79, politician (Georgia House of Representatives) (b. 1941)
  - Bernie Madoff, 82, financier and convicted fraudster who ran the world's largest Ponzi scheme (b. 1938)
  - Lynn Thomas, 61, professional football player in the NFL (San Francisco 49ers) and USFL Oakland Invaders; (1982 Super Bowl champion) (b. 1959)
  - Rusty Young, 75, guitarist, vocalist and songwriter, co-founder of the band Poco (b. 1946)
- April 15
  - Moshe Ber Beck, 86, Hungarian-born American rabbi and anti-Zionist campaigner (b. 1934)
  - Roscoe Dixon, 71, politician, member of the Tennessee House of Representatives (1984–1994) and Senate (1994–2005) (b. 1949)
  - Vartan Gregorian, 87, Iranian-born American academic, president of Carnegie Corporation (b. 1934)
  - Leroy Keyes, 74, College Football Hall of Fame football player (Philadelphia Eagles, Kansas City Chiefs) (b. 1947)
  - John C. McAdams, 75, political scientist (b. 1945)
- April 16
  - Charles Geschke, 81, computer scientist, co-founder of Adobe Inc. (b. 1939)
  - Nelson Haggerty, 47, college basketball coach (North Texas Mean Green, Central Missouri Mules, Midwestern State Mustangs) (b. 1973)
  - Felix Silla, 84, actor (Cousin Itt on The Addams Family) and stuntman (b. 1937)
- April 17
  - Fred Arbanas, 82, football player (Dallas Texans/Kansas City Chiefs) (b. 1939)
  - Black Rob, 51, rapper ("Whoa!", "Bad Boy for Life") (b. 1969)
- April 18
  - Elizabeth Furse, 84, politician, member of the U.S. House of Representatives (1993–1999) (b. 1936)
  - Frank McCabe, 93, basketball player, Olympic champion (1952) (b. 1927)
  - Paul Oscher, 71, blues singer (b. 1950)
  - Anthony Russo, 74, politician, mayor of Hoboken (1993–2001) (b. 1947)
  - Al Young, 81, poet, novelist, essayist, screenwriter, professor, and former Poet Laureate of California (b. 1939)
- April 19
  - Shaler Halimon, 76, professional basketball player (NBA & ABA) (b. 1945) (announced on this date)
  - Walter Mondale, 93, politician, 42nd Vice President of the United States (1977–1981), senator (1964–1976), ambassador to Japan (1993–1996) (b. 1928)
  - Jim Steinman, 73, Grammy Award-winning composer, lyricist, record producer, and playwright (b. 1947)
  - Robin Wood, 67, artist specializing in game art and fantasy (b. 1953)
- April 20
  - Monte Hellman, 91, film director, producer, writer, and editor (b. 1929)
  - Tom Robson, 75, baseball player and coach (MLB) (b. 1946)
  - Tempest Storm, 93, burlesque star and actress (b. 1928)
  - Bill Wynne, 99, World War II veteran, photojournalist and dog trainer (Smoky) (b. 1922)
- April 21
  - Joe Long, 88, musician (The Four Seasons) (b. 1932)
  - D. Michael Quinn, 77, historian of the Latter Day Saint movement and member of the September Six (b. 1944)
  - Henrietta M. Smith, 98, academic, librarian and storyteller (b. 1922)
  - Carl Spielvogel, 92, marketing executive and diplomat, ambassador to Slovakia (2000–2001) (b. 1928)
- April 22
  - Terrence Clarke, 19, basketball player (Kentucky Wildcats) (b. 2001)
  - Charles Fries, 92, producer (The Amazing Spider-Man, The Martian Chronicles) (b. 1928)
  - Adrian Garrett, 78, baseball player (Atlanta Braves, Chicago Cubs, Hiroshima Toyo Carp) (b. 1943)
  - Thelma Harper, 80, politician, member of the Tennessee Senate (1989–2019) (b. 1940)
  - Shock G, 57, rapper (Digital Underground) and songwriter ("The Humpty Dance", "I Get Around") (b. 1963)
- April 23
  - Charlie Glotzbach, 82, racing driver (NASCAR Winston Cup Series) (b.1938)
  - Dan Kaminsky, 42, computer security researcher (b. 1979)
  - Bill Whittington, 71, racing driver and convicted criminal, 24 Hours of Le Mans winner (1979) (b. 1949)
- April 24
  - Bob Fass, 87, radio host (WBAI) (b. 1933)
  - Duane Hagadone, 88, newspaper publisher (b. 1932)
  - Nathan Jung, 74, actor and stuntman (b. 1946)
  - Robert Slavin, 70, psychologist (b. 1950)
  - John T. Ward Jr., 75, racehorse trainer (b. 1945)
- April 25
  - Mike Davis, 65, professional football player and defensive back in the National Football League (NFL) (b. 1956)
  - Denny Freeman, 76, blues guitarist and keyboardist (Stevie Ray Vaughan, Jimmie Vaughan, Bob Dylan, others) (b. 1944)
- April 26
  - Geno Hayes, 33, professional football player and linebacker in the National Football League (NFL) (b. 1987)
  - Dick Mann, 86, Hall of Fame motorcycle racer (b. 1934)
  - Al Schmitt, 91, Grammy Award winning recording engineer (RCA Records, Capitol Studios) (b. 1930)
- April 27
  - George P. Kazen, 81, jurist, judge (1979–2018) and chief judge (1996–2003) of the U.S. District Court for Southern Texas (b. 1940)
  - Charles Strum, 73, journalist (The New York Times) and author (b. 1948)
- April 28
  - Michael Collins, 90, astronaut (Apollo 11), Assistant Secretary of State for Public Affairs (1970–1971) (b. 1930)
  - Jason Matthews, 69, author (Red Sparrow) (b. 1951)
- April 29
  - Martin Bookspan, 94, music broadcaster (Live from Lincoln Center) and author (b. 1926)
  - Anne Buydens, 102, German-born American philanthropist and widow of Kirk Douglas (b. 1919)
  - Johnny Crawford, 75, actor (The Rifleman, Village of the Giants, The Space Children) and singer (b. 1946)
  - Pierce Fulton, 28, disc jockey and record producer (b. 1992)
  - Courtney Hall, 52, professional football player in the NFL (b. 1968)
  - Billie Hayes, 96, actress (H.R. Pufnstuf, The Black Cauldron, Transformers: Rescue Bots, Li'l Abner) (b. 1924)
  - Pete Lammons, 77, football player, New York Jets (1966–1971) and the Green Bay Packers (1972) (b. 1943)
  - Tony Markellis, bassist (Trey Anastasio Band) (b. 1952)
  - Frank McRae, 80, actor (Last Action Hero, Licence to Kill) and professional football player (b. 1941)
  - David B. Wake, 84, herpetologist (b. 1936)
- April 30
  - Eli Broad, 87, philanthropist, art collector, and museum co-founder (The Broad) (b. 1933)
  - John Dee Holeman, 92, Piedmont blues guitarist, singer. and songwriter (b. 1929)

== May ==
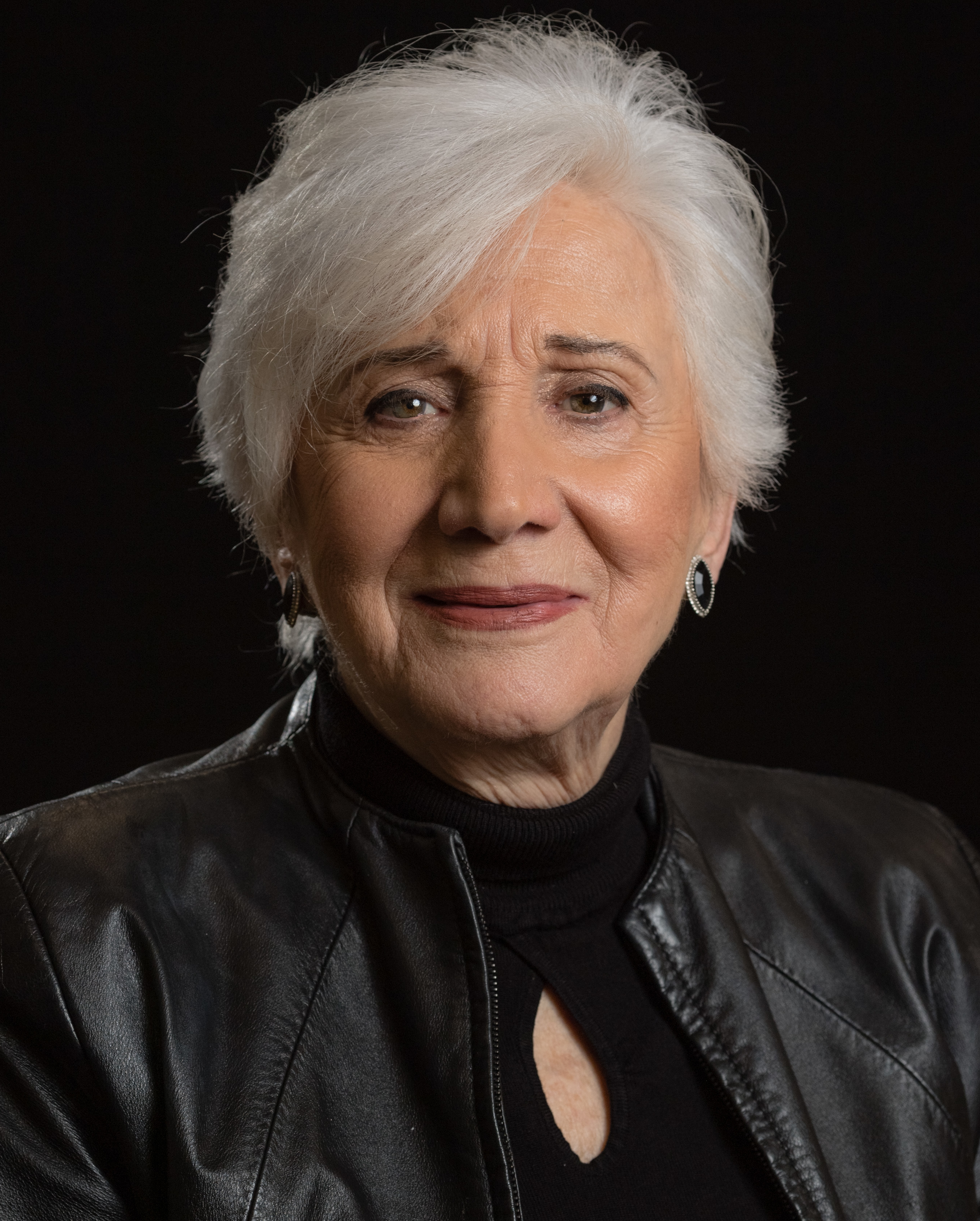
Olympia Dukakis

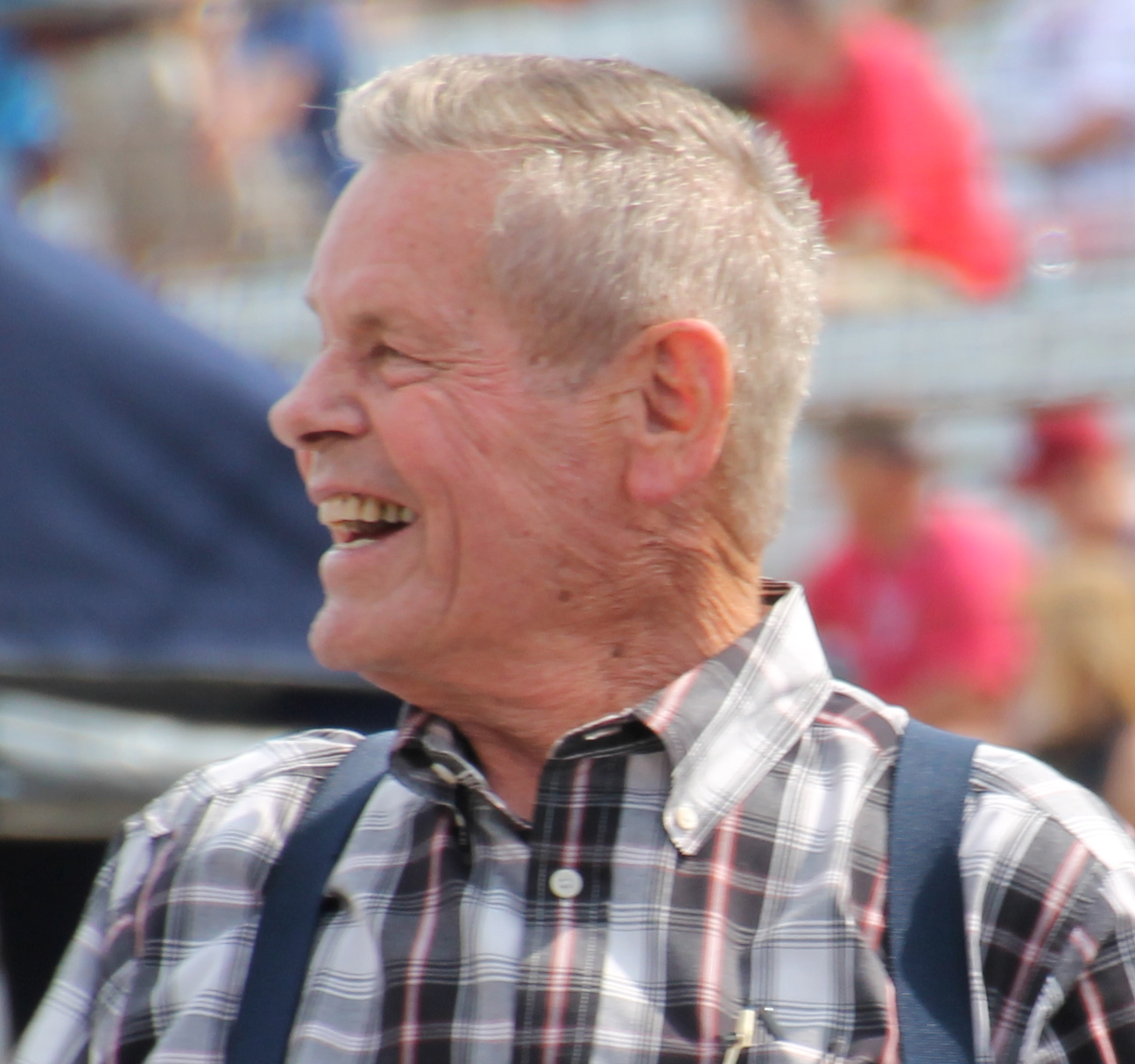
Bobby Unser

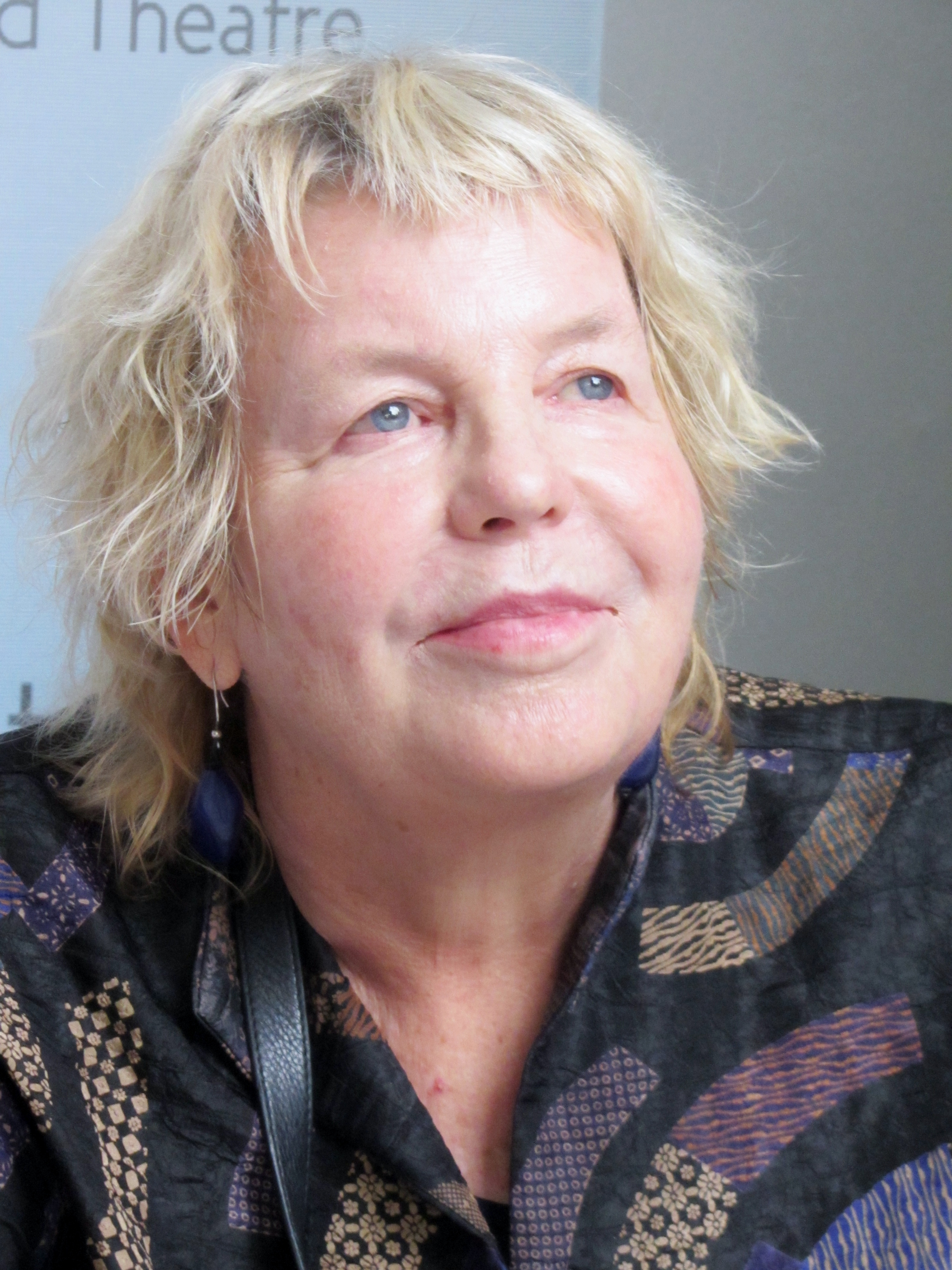
Lucinda Franks

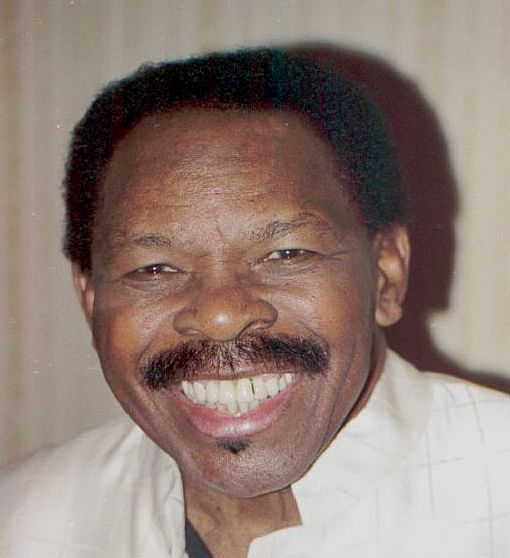
Lloyd Price

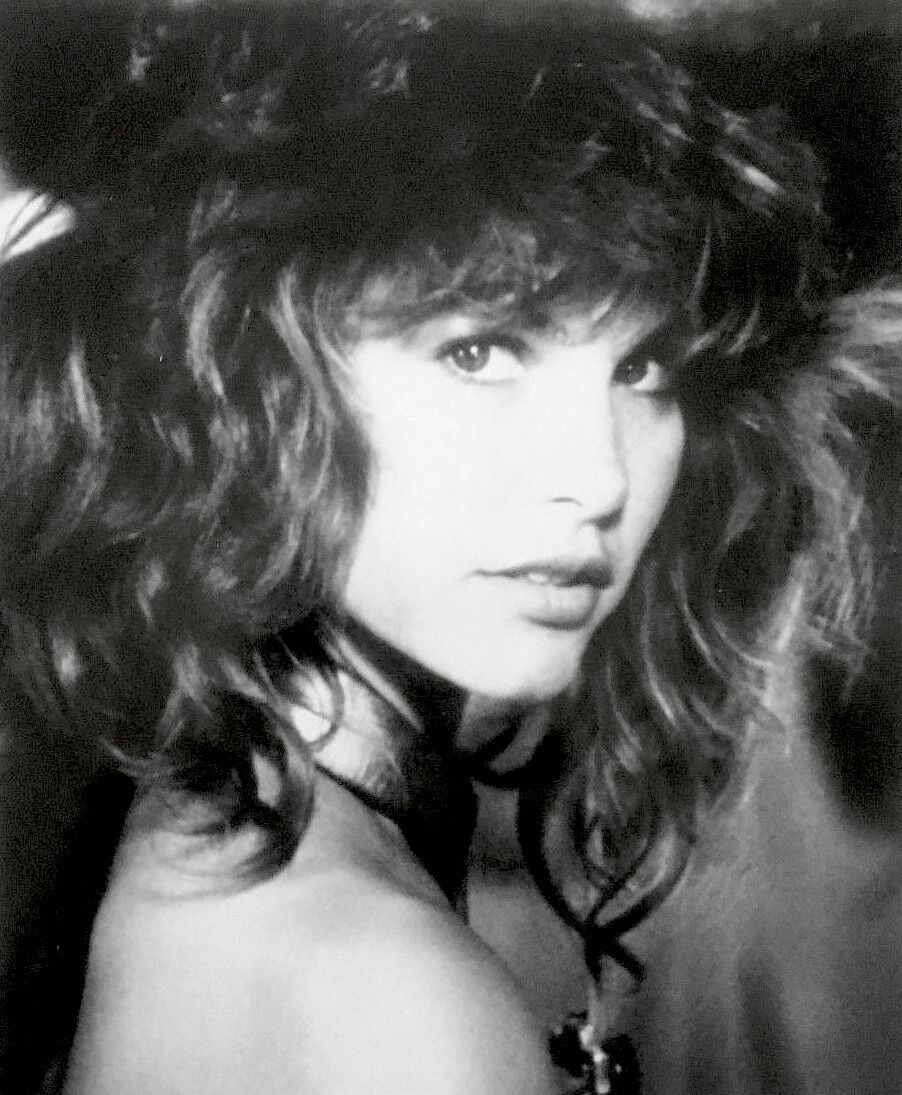
Tawny Kitaen

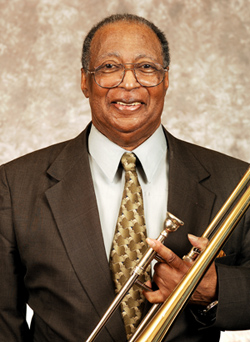
Curtis Fuller

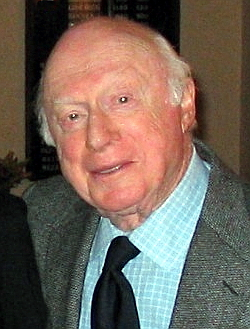
Norman Lloyd

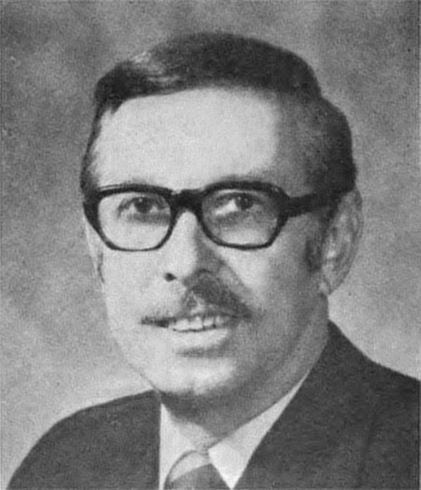
Lester L. Wolff

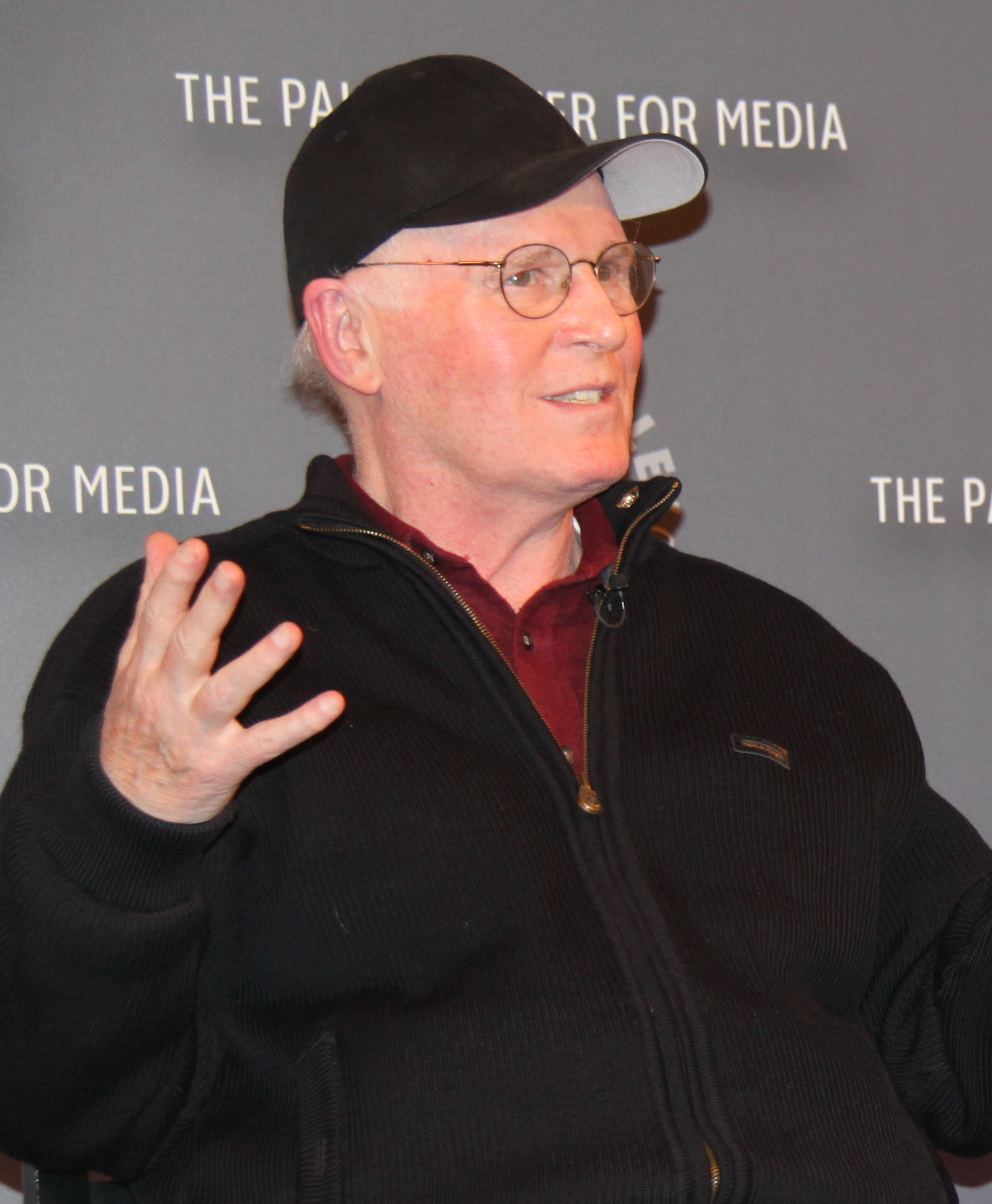
Charles Grodin

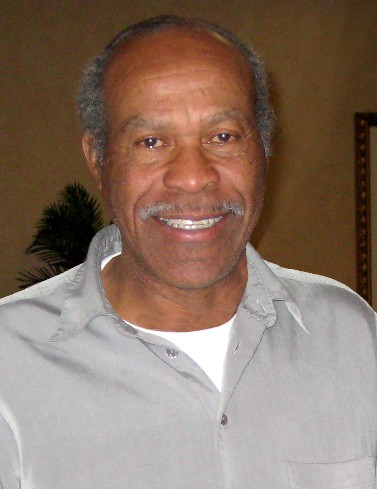
Lee Evans

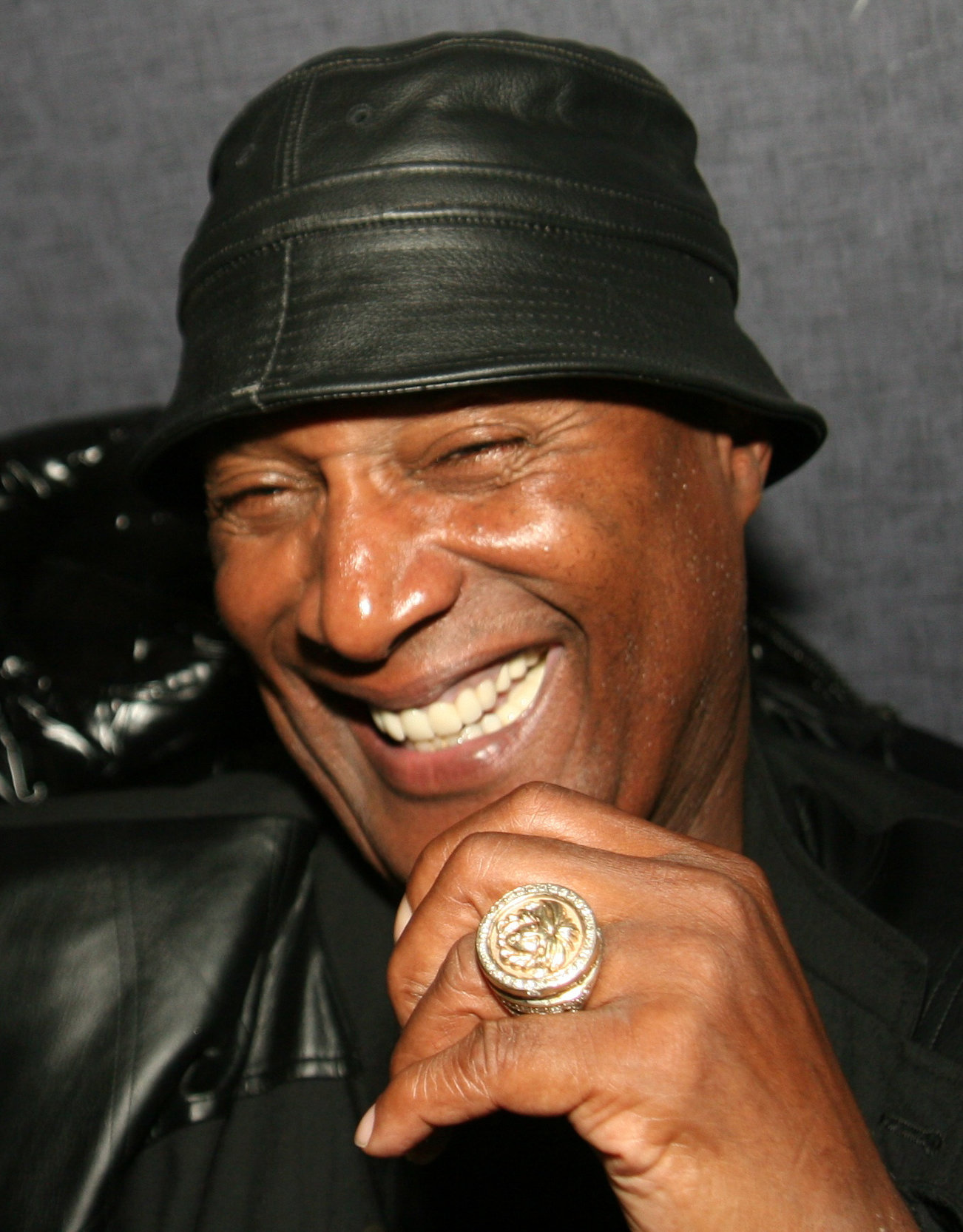
Paul Mooney

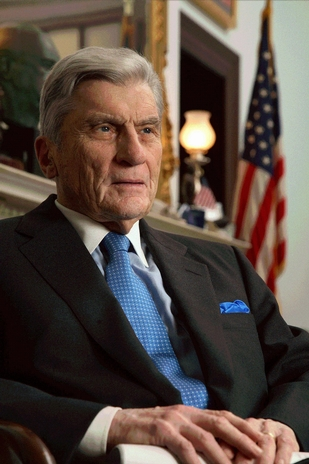
John Warner

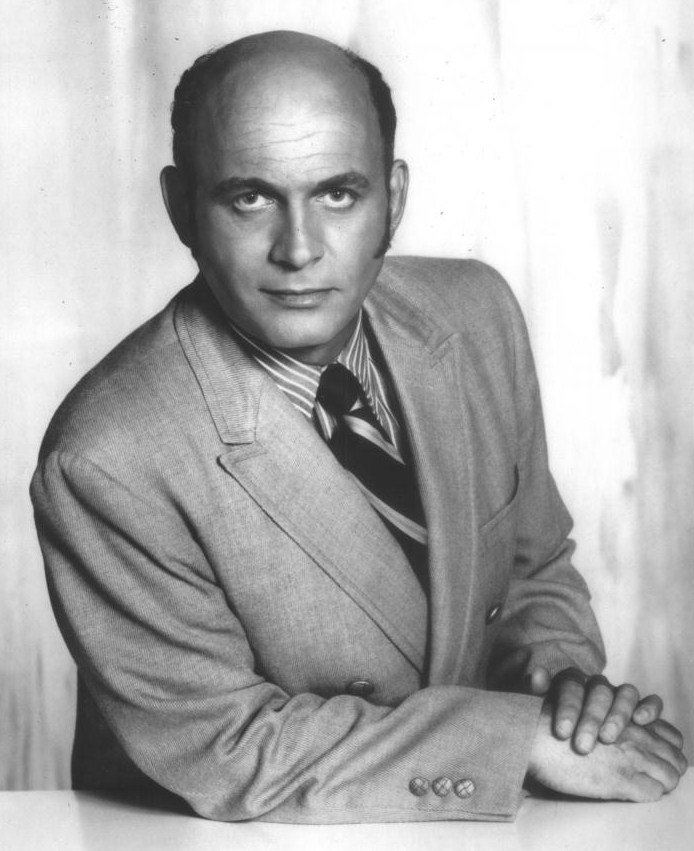
Gavin MacLeod

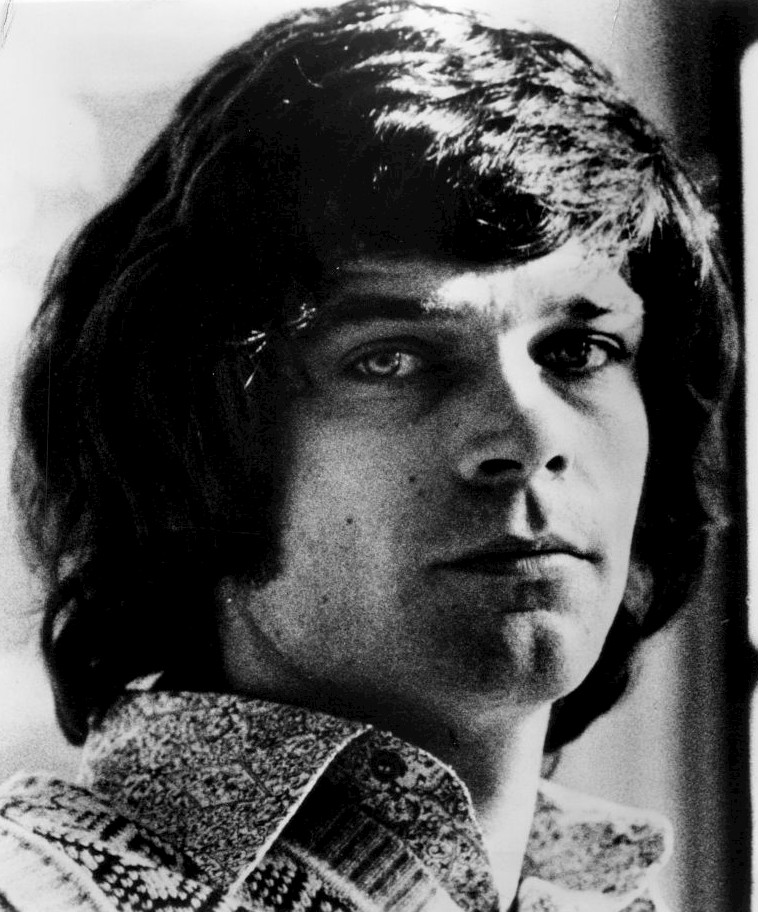
B. J. Thomas

- May 1
  - Chuck Darling, 91, basketball player (Iowa Hawkeyes) (b. 1930)
  - Olympia Dukakis, 89, actress and 1988 Academy Award winner for Moonstruck. Also known for Sinatra and Steel Magnolias (b. 1931)
  - Helen Murray Free, 98, chemist (b. 1923)
  - Joseph W. Hatchett, 88, attorney and judge for the U.S. Court of Appeals for the Fifth and Eleventh Circuits (b. 1932)
  - Wondress Hutchinson, 56, singer ("Got to Have Your Love") (b. 1964)
  - Al Jamison, 83, football player (Houston Oilers) (b. 1937)
  - John Paul Leon, 49, comic book artist (b. 1972)
  - Joseph Z. Nederlander, 93, theatre owner and manager (b. 1927)
  - Ernest E. West, 89, soldier, Medal of Honor recipient (b. 1931)
- May 2
  - Bob Abernethy, 93, journalist (NBC News) and television presenter (Religion & Ethics Newsweekly) (b. 1927)
  - Jacques d'Amboise, 86, ballet dancer, choreographer and actor (Seven Brides for Seven Brothers, Carousel) (b. 1934)
  - Eric McClure, 42, racing driver (NASCAR Xfinity Series) (b. 1978)
  - Sally Falk Moore, 97, legal anthropologist and professor emerita at Harvard University (b. 1924)
  - Bobby Unser, 87, racing driver, three-time Indianapolis 500 winner (b. 1934)
  - Tommy West, 78, music producer (Life and Times, I Got a Name) and singer-songwriter (b. 1942)
- May 3
  - Hal Breeden, 76, baseball player (Montreal Expos, Hanshin Tigers, Chicago Cubs) (b. 1944)
  - Vinson Filyaw, 51, convicted child rapist (b. 1969)
  - Frazier Glenn Miller Jr., 80, domestic terrorist and perpetrator of the Overland Park Jewish Community Center shooting (b. 1940)
  - Phil Naro, 63, rock vocalist (Talas) (b. 1957 or 1958)
  - Lloyd Price, 88, Hall of Fame R&B singer ("Personality", "Lawdy Miss Clawdy", "Stagger Lee") (b. 1933)
  - Ed Ward, 72, music writer and radio commentator (b. 1948)
- May 4
  - Jim Hagan, 83, basketball player (Tennessee Tech Golden Eagles, Phillips 66ers) (b. 1938)
  - Ray Miller, 76, baseball coach and manager (Minnesota Twins, Baltimore Orioles) (b. 1945)
- May 5
  - Jonathan Bush, 89, banker and brother of President George H. W. Bush (b. 1931)
  - Del Crandall, 91, baseball player (Boston Braves/Milwaukee Braves) and manager (Milwaukee Brewers) (b. 1930)
  - Lucinda Franks, 74, Pulitzer Prize-winning journalist (The New Yorker, The New York Times, The Atlantic) (b. 1946)
  - George Jung, 78, drug trafficker and smuggler, subject of the movie Blow (b. 1942)
  - David F. Swensen, 67, investor and philanthropist (b. 1954)
- May 6
  - Jim Bertelsen, 71, football player (Los Angeles Rams) (b. 1950)
  - David Bulow, 41, soccer player (Dungannon Swifts, Richmond Kickers) (b. 1980)
  - David H. Gambrell, 91, politician, member of the U.S. Senate (1971–1972) (b. 1929)
  - Pervis Staples, 85, Staple Singers co-founder (b. 1935)
  - Paul Van Doren, 90, entrepreneur, co-founder of Vans (b. 1930)
  - Karl Wirsum, 81, artist (b. 1939)
  - Felix Zabala, 83, Cuban-born American boxing promoter (b. 1937)
- May 7
  - Ernest Angley, 99, evangelist (b. 1921)
  - Tawny Kitaen, 59, actress, comedian, and media personality (Bachelor Party) (b. 1961)
  - Cruz Reynoso, 90, civil rights lawyer and jurist, associate judge of the Supreme Court of California (1982–1987) (b. 1931)
- May 8
  - Bo, First Dog of the United States (b. 2008)
  - Pete du Pont, 86, politician, governor of Delaware (1977–1985), member of the Delaware (1969–1971) and U.S. House of Representatives (1971–1977) (b. 1935)
  - Aurelia Greene, 86, politician, member of the New York State Assembly (1982–2009) (b. 1934)
  - Curtis Fuller, 88, jazz trombonist (b. 1932)
  - Eula Hall, 93, healthcare activist (b. 1927)
  - Ronald Inglehart, 86, political scientist (Inglehart–Welzel cultural map of the world) (b. 1934)
  - Helmut Jahn, 81, German-American architect (Liberty Place, James R. Thompson Center, 50 West Street) (b. 1940)
  - Cal Luther, 93, basketball coach (Murray State Racers, UT Martin Skyhawks, Longwood Lancers) (b. 1927)
  - Spencer Silver, 80, chemist, co-inventor of Post-it Notes (b. 1941)
- May 9
  - Marye Anne Fox, 73, chemist and academic administrator, chancellor of North Carolina State University (1998–2004) and the University of California, San Diego (2004–2012) (b. 1947)
  - George Hovland, 94, Olympic cross country skier (1952) (b. 1926)
  - Robert Ward, 68, politician (b. 1952)
- May 10
  - Art Gensler, 85, architect, founder of Gensler (b. 1935)
  - Froy Salinas, 81, politician, member of the Texas House of Representatives (1977–1985) (b. 1939)
- May 11
  - Colt Brennan, 37, football player (Hawaii Rainbow Warriors, Washington Redskins) (b. 1983)
  - Dan W. Brown, 70, politician, member of the Missouri House of Representatives (2008–2010) and Senate (2011–2019) (b. 1950)
  - Norman Lloyd, 106, actor (St. Elsewhere, Dead Poets Society, Limelight), producer and director (b. 1914)
  - Richard Nonas, 85, sculptor (b. 1936)
  - Chuck Welke, 67, politician, member of the South Dakota Senate (2013–2015) (b. 1953)
  - Lester L. Wolff, 102, politician, member of the U.S. House of Representatives (1965–1981) (b. 1919)
- May 12
  - Jerry Burns, 94, football player (Michigan Wolverines) and coach (Minnesota Vikings) (b. 1927)
  - Jim Klobuchar, 93, journalist and author (Star Tribune) and father of U.S. Senator Amy Klobuchar (b. 1928)
  - Bob Koester, 88, music executive and founder of Delmark Records (b. 1932)
  - Ralph Turlington, 100, politician, member (1950–1974) and speaker (1967–1969) of the Florida House of Representatives, Florida education commissioner (1974–1986) (b. 1920)
- May 13
  - Norman Simmons, 91, pianist, arranger and composer (b. 1929)
  - Jack Terricloth, 50, musician (The World/Inferno Friendship Society) (b. 1970)
- May 14
  - Jay Barbree, 87, space travel news correspondent (NBC News) (b. 1933)
  - Otto Beatty Jr., 81, politician, member of the Ohio House of Representatives (1980–1999) (b. 1940)
  - New Jack (Jerome Young), 58, professional wrestler (SMW, ECW, XPW) (b. 1963)
  - Bobby Jones, 81, college basketball coach (Kentucky Wesleyan Panthers) (b. 1939 or 1940)
- May 15
  - Felicia Elizondo, 74, transgender activist (b. 1946)
  - Fred Martinelli, 92, Hall of Fame college football coach (Ashland University) (b. 1929)
- May 16 – Mike Carter, 67, politician, member of the Tennessee House of Representatives (since 2003) (b. 1953)
- May 17
  - Patsy Bruce, 81, country music songwriter ("Mammas Don't Let Your Babies Grow Up to Be Cowboys") (b. 1940)
  - Don Kernodle, 71, professional wrestler (Jim Crockett Promotions) (b. 1950)
  - Buddy Roemer, 77, politician, member of the U.S. House of Representatives (1981–1988), Governor of Louisiana (1988–1992) (b. 1943)
- May 18
  - Joe J. Christensen, 91, Mormon leader, president of Ricks College (1985–1989), general authority (since 1989) (b. 1929)
  - Robert V. Cullison, 84, politician, member of the Oklahoma House of Representatives (1973–1979) and Senate (1979–1995) (b. 1934)
  - Charles Grodin, 86, actor (The Heartbreak Kid, Midnight Run, Beethoven) and comedian, Emmy winner (1978) (b. 1935)
  - Arthur Hills, 91, golf course designer (b. 1930)
  - Terence Riley, 66, architect and museum curator, chief curator of architecture and design at the Museum of Modern Art (1992–2006) (b. 1954)
  - Corinne Wood, 66, politician, lieutenant governor of Illinois (1999–2003) (b. 1954)
- May 19
  - Gary Blodgett, 83, politician, member of the Iowa House of Representatives (1993–2001) (b. 1937)
  - Alix Dobkin, 80, folk singer-songwriter, lesbian feminist activist and memoirist (b. 1940)
  - Esther A. Hopkins, 94, chemist, environmental lawyer and civil servant (b. 1926)
  - David Anthony Kraft, 68–69, comic book writer (The Defenders, Captain America) (b. 1952)
  - Paul Mooney, 79, actor (The Buddy Holly Story, Bamboozled), comedian (Chappelle's Show) and writer (b. 1941)
  - Lee Evans, 74, sprinter, double Olympic champion (1968), coach, and activist (b.1947)
  - Charles C. Hagemeister, 74, soldier, Medal of Honor recipient (b. 1946)
  - Quintin Jones, 41, convicted murderer, execution by lethal injection (b. 1979)
- May 20
  - Glen E. Conrad, 71, lawyer and jurist, U.S. District Court for Western Virginia (since 2003) (b. 1949)
  - Roger Hawkins, 75, drummer (Muscle Shoals Rhythm Section) and recording studio owner (Muscle Shoals Sound Studio) (b. 1945)
  - John Powless, 88. college basketball coach (Wisconsin Badgers) (b. 1932)
- May 21
  - Margherita Marchione, 99, Roman Catholic nun and writer (b. 1922)
  - Stephen Zappala Sr., 88, judge, member (1983–2002) and chief justice (2001–2002) of the Supreme Court of Pennsylvania (b. 1932)
  - Harvey Schlossberg, 85, police officer (b. 1936)
- May 22
  - Joe Beckwith, 66, baseball player (Los Angeles Dodgers, Kansas City Royals), World Series champion (1981, 1985) (b. 1955)
  - David Danielson, 73, politician, member of the New Hampshire House of Representatives (since 2013) (b. 1947)
- May 23
  - Dewayne Blackwell, 84, songwriter ("Friends in Low Places", "Mr. Blue") (b. 1936)
  - Charles Boutin, 79, politician and administrative law judge, mayor of Aberdeen, Maryland (1994–1998), member of the Maryland House of Delegates (1999–2005) (b. 1942)
  - Eric Carle, 91, writer and illustrator (The Very Hungry Caterpillar, The Grouchy Ladybug, Brown Bear, Brown Bear, What Do You See?), (b. 1929)
- May 24
  - Robert Green Hall, 47, makeup artist (Angel, Buffy the Vampire Slayer) and film director (Laid to Rest) (b. 1973)
  - Paul Christy, 82, professional wrestler (NWA, ICW, WWF) (b. 1939)
  - Samuel E. Wright, 74, actor and singer (The Little Mermaid, The Lion King) (b. 1946)
  - Anna Halprin, 100, choreographer (b. 1920)
  - Desiree Gould, 76, actress (Sleepaway Camp) (b. 1945)
- May 25
  - J. D. Roberts, 88, football player and coach (New Orleans Saints) (b. 1932)
  - John Warner, 94, politician, U.S. Senator from Virginia (1979–2009) and 61st United States Secretary of the Navy (1972–1974) (b. 1927)
  - Lois Ehlert, 86, children's author and illustrator (Chicka Chicka Boom Boom) (b. 1934)
- May 26 – Rusty Warren, 91, comedian and singer (Knockers Up!) (b. 1930)
- May 27
  - Foster Friess, 81, investment manager (b. 1940)
  - Robert Hogan, 87, actor (b. 1933)
  - Robbie McCauley, 78, playwright and actress (b. 1942)
- May 28
  - Albert Kookesh, 72, politician, member of the Alaska Senate (2005–2013) and House of Representatives (1997–2005) (b. 1948)
  - Jim Beirne, 74, football player (Houston Oilers, San Diego Chargers) (b. 1946)
  - William F. Clinger Jr., 92, politician, member of the U.S. House of Representatives (1979–1997) and chair of the House Oversight Committee (1995–1997) (b. 1929)
- May 29
  - Gavin MacLeod, 90, actor (McHale's Navy, The Mary Tyler Moore Show, The Love Boat) (b. 1931)
  - B. J. Thomas, 78, singer ("Raindrops Keep Fallin' on My Head", "(Hey Won't You Play) Another Somebody Done Somebody Wrong Song", "Hooked on a Feeling"), Grammy winner (1981), (b. 1942)
  - Floyd McClung, 75, clergyman, Protestant missionary, and writer (b. 1945)
  - Joe Lara, 58, actor (American Cyborg: Steel Warrior, Steel Frontier, Tarzan: The Epic Adventures) (b. 1962)
  - Gwen Shamblin Lara, 66, writer and dietician (Christian diet programs) (b. 1955)
- May 31
  - Arlene Golonka, 85, actress (Mayberry R.F.D., The Andy Griffith Show, Hang 'Em High) (b. 1936)
  - Lil Loaded, 20, rapper and Internet personality (b. 2000)
  - Leon Burtnett, 78, football coach (Purdue University) (b. 1943)

== June ==
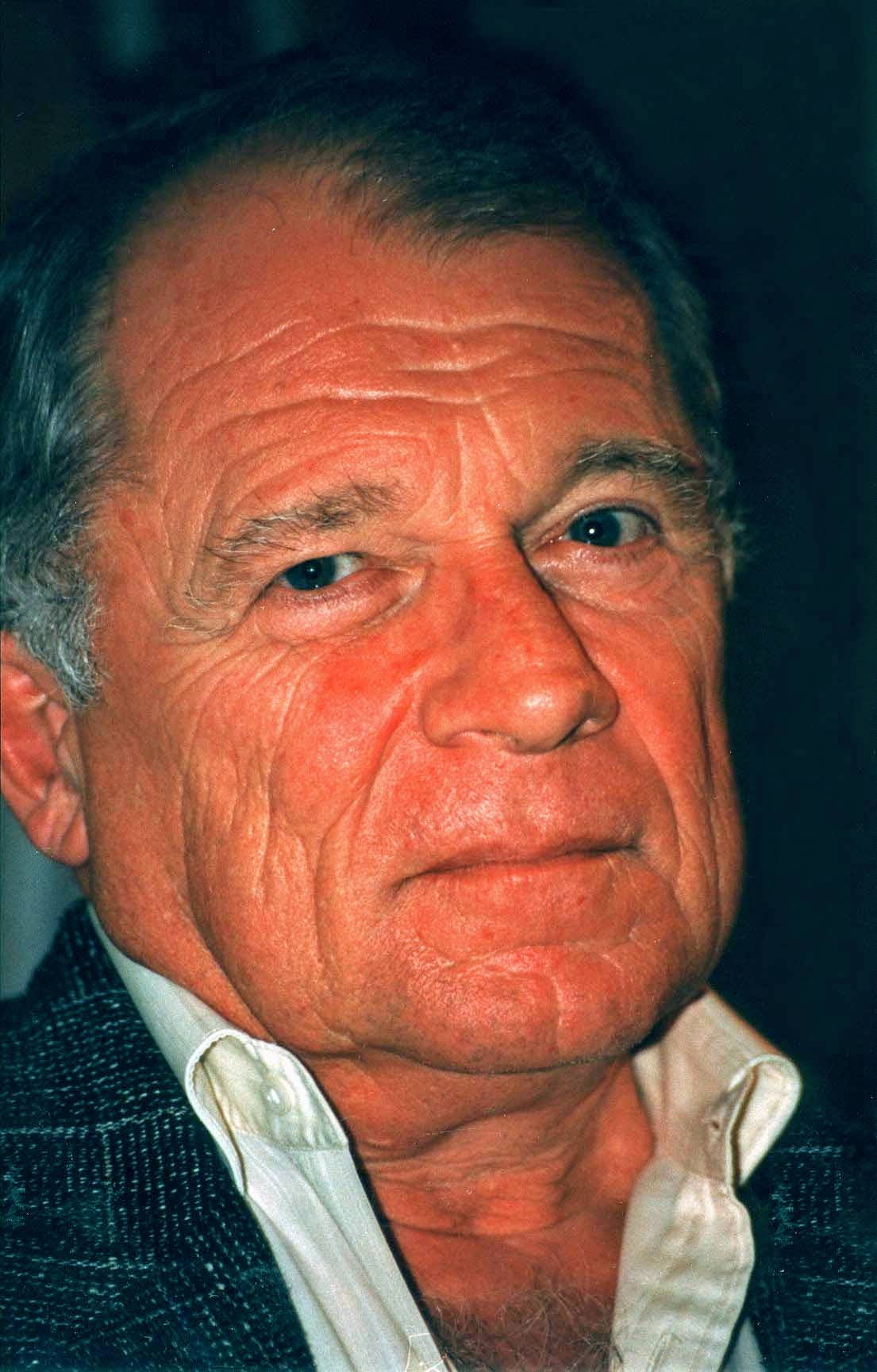
F. Lee Bailey

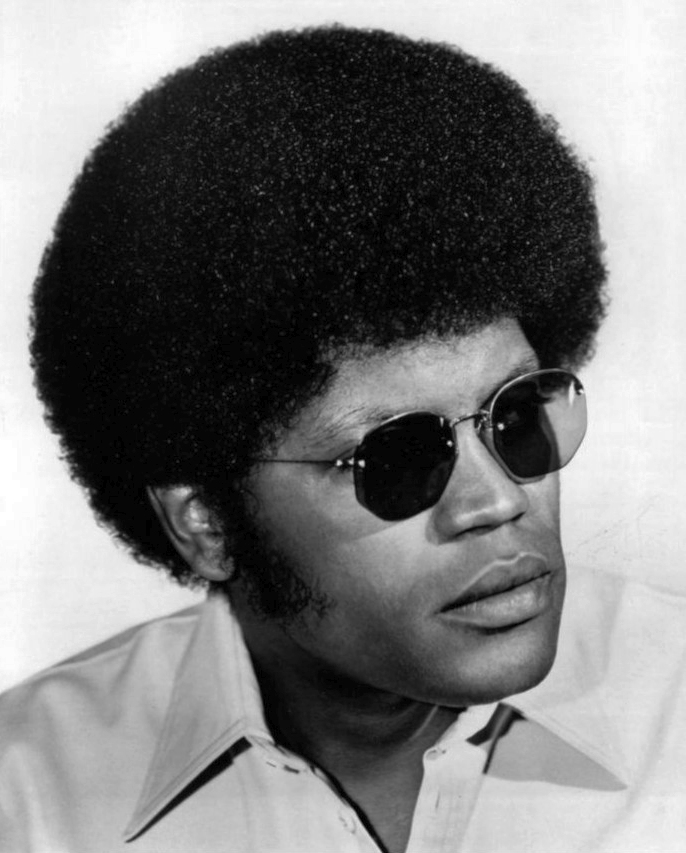
Clarence Williams III

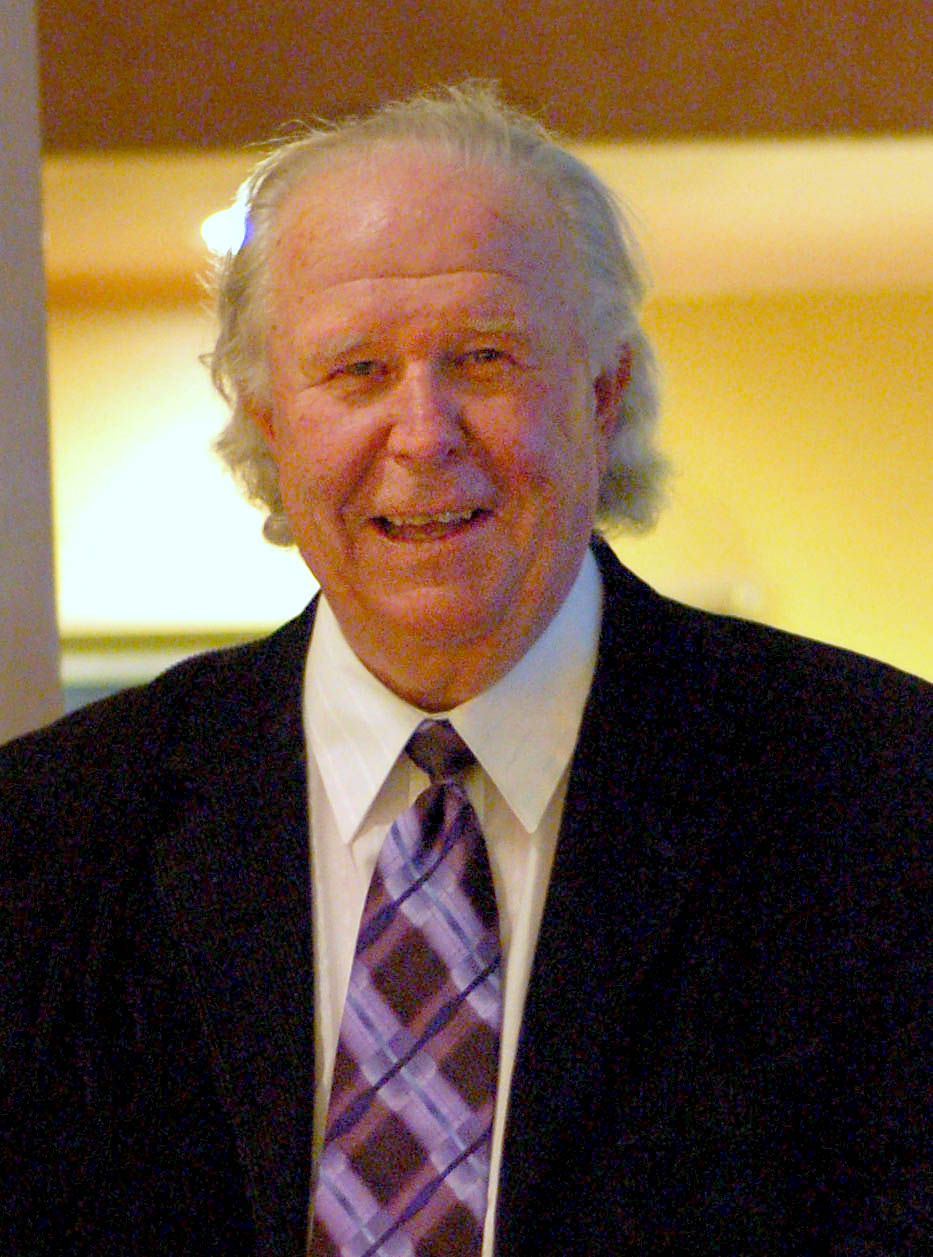
Ned Beatty

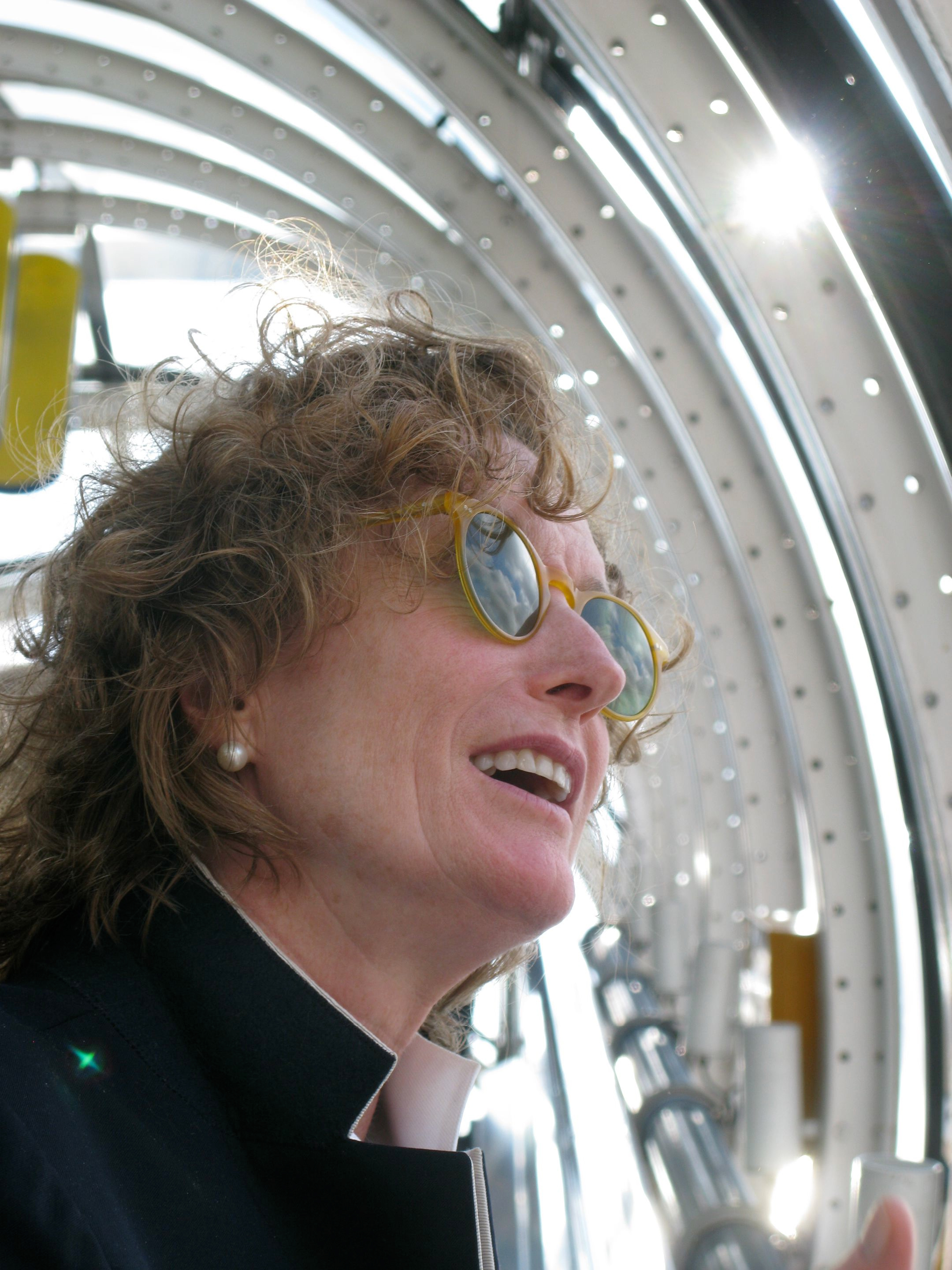
Lisa Banes

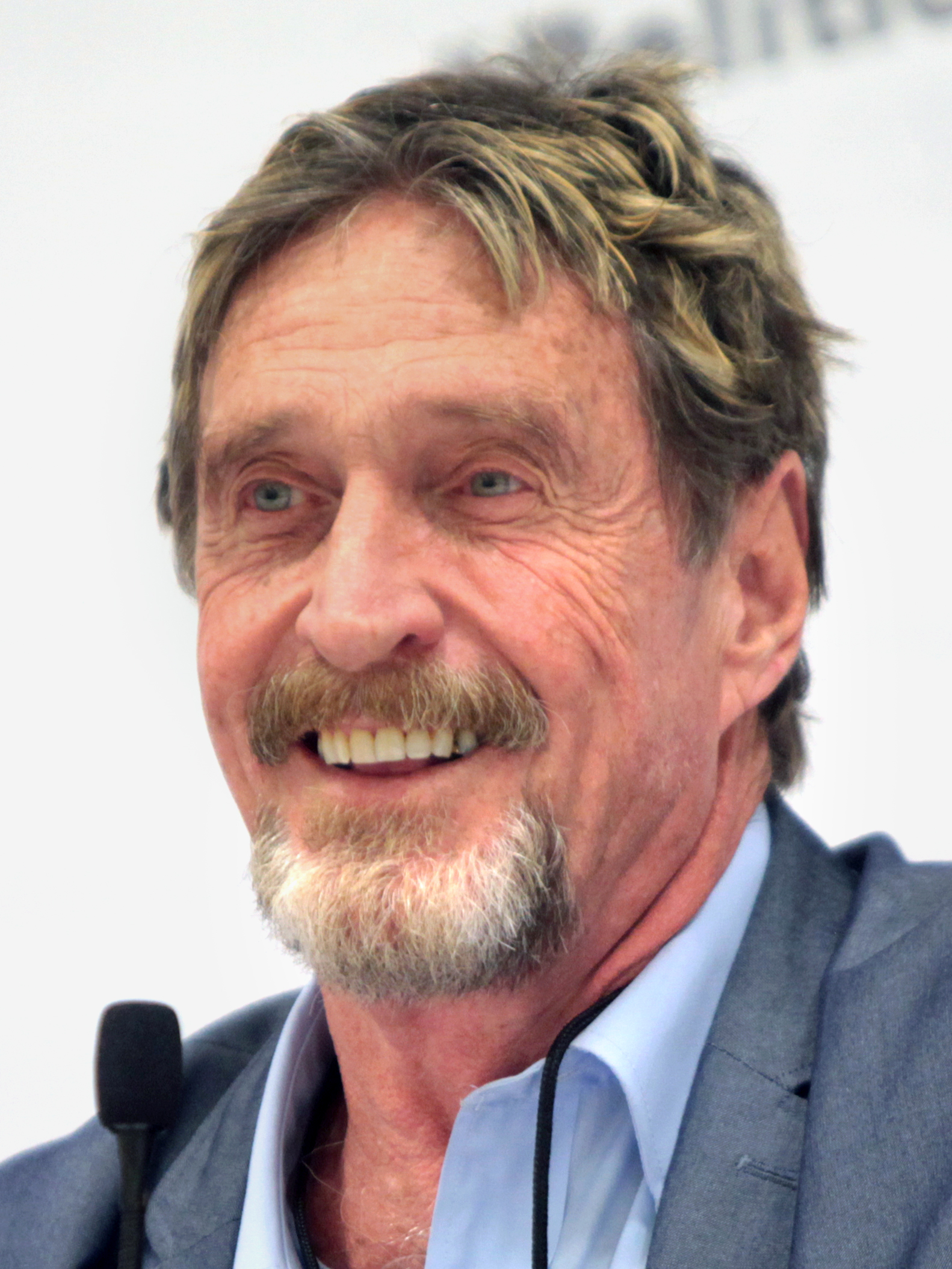
John McAfee

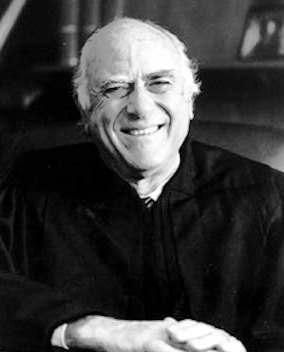
Jack B. Weinstein

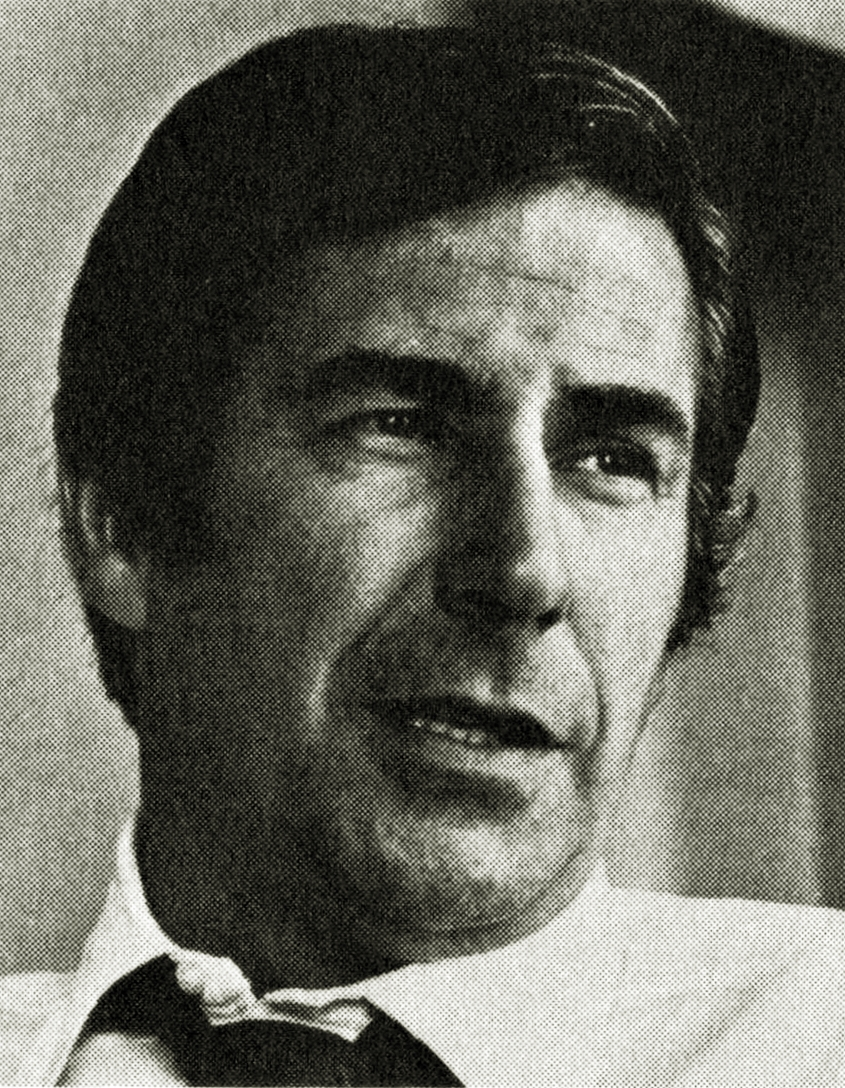
Mike Gravel

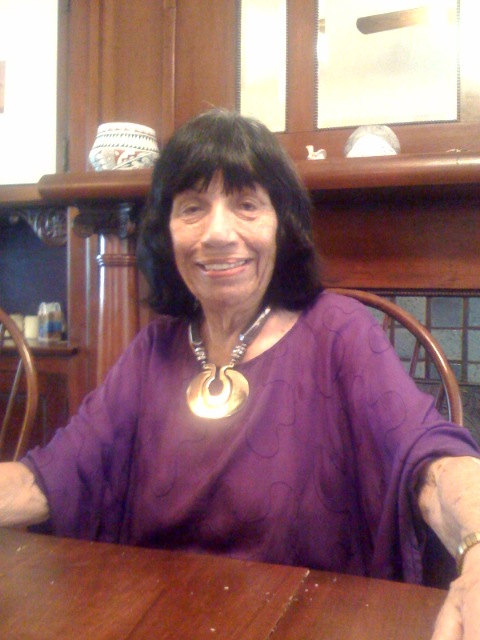
Elizabeth Martínez

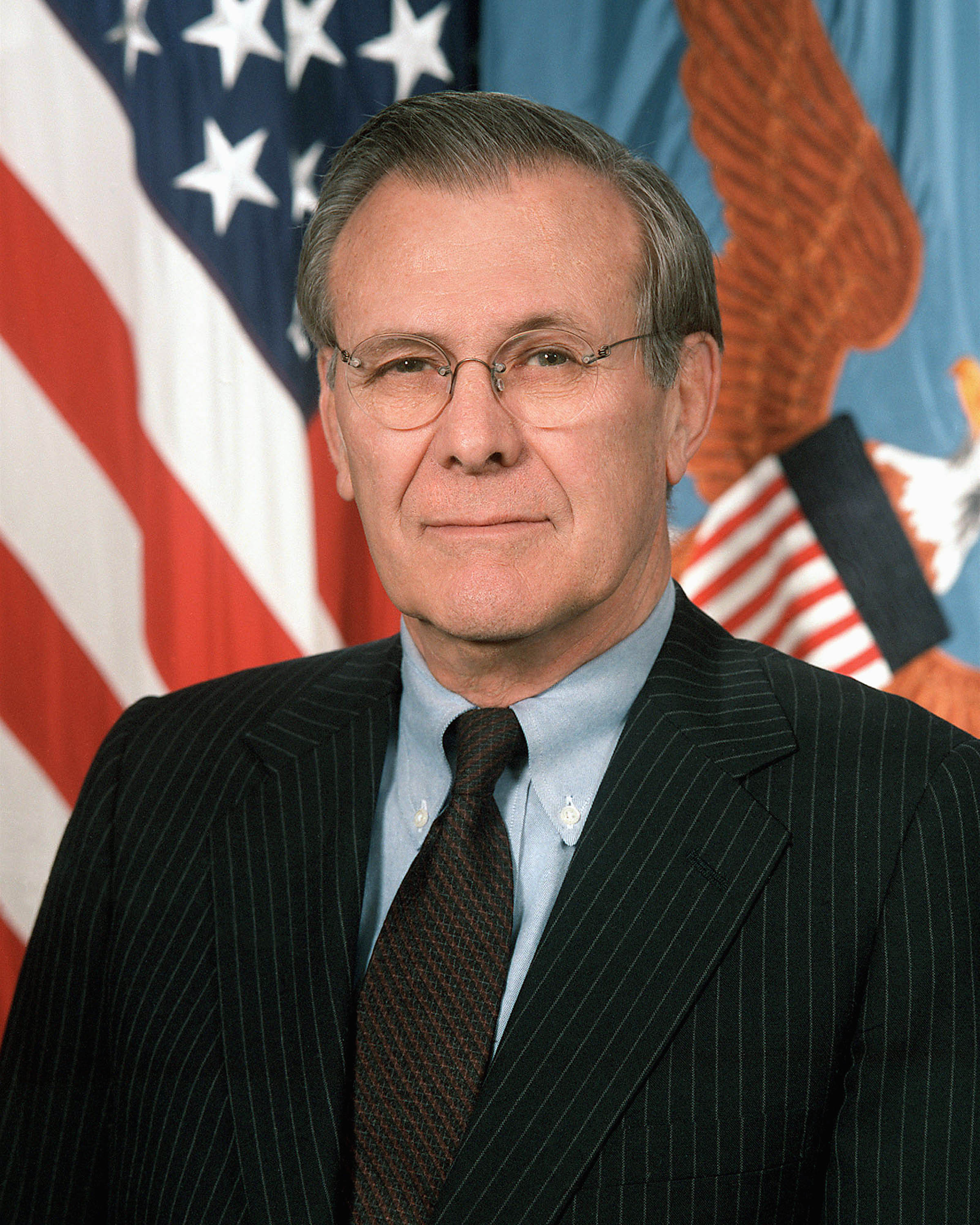
Donald Rumsfeld

- June 1
  - Mike Marshall, 78, baseball player (Los Angeles Dodgers, Montreal Expos, Minnesota Twins) (b. 1943)
  - Bunny Matthews, 70, cartoonist and writer (b. 1951)
- June 2
  - Bill Scanlon, 64, tennis player, cancer (b. 1956)
  - Eric Mobley, 51, basketball player (Milwaukee Bucks, Vancouver Grizzlies), (b. 1970)
- June 3
  - F. Lee Bailey, 87, criminal defense attorney (Sam Sheppard, O. J. Simpson) (b. 1933)
  - Karla Burns, 66, operatic mezzo-soprano (b. 1954)
  - Ernie Lively, actor (The Man in the Moon, The Sisterhood of the Traveling Pants, Looking Glass) (b. 1947)
- June 4
  - John Malcolm Patterson, 99, politician, Governor of Alabama (1959–1963) (b. 1921)
  - Tom Fink, 92, politician, mayor of Anchorage (1987–1994) and speaker of the Alaska House of Representatives (1973–1975) (b. 1928)
  - Clarence Williams III, actor (Purple Rain, The Legend of 1900, The Butler) (b. 1939)
- June 5
  - Galen Young, 45, basketball player (Charlotte 49ers, Yakima Sun Kings, Perth Wildcats) (b. 1975)
  - Richard Robinson, 84, businessman and educator, president and CEO of Scholastic Corporation (since 1975) (b. 1937)
- June 7
  - Douglas S. Cramer, 89, television producer (Wonder Woman, Dynasty, The Love Boat) and art collector (b. 1931)
  - Jim Fassel, 71, football player (The Hawaiians) and coach (Utah Utes, New York Giants) (b. 1949)
- June 8
  - Joseph Margolis, 97, philosopher (b. 1924)
  - Dean Parrish, 79, soul singer (b. 1942)
- June 9
  - Dale Danks, 81, politician, mayor of Jackson (1977–1989), complications from a stroke (b. 1939)
  - Robert Katzmann, 68, jurist, judge (since 1999) and chief judge (2013–2020) for the U.S. Court of Appeals for the Second Circuit (b. 1953)
  - Dakota Skye, 27, pornographic film actress (b. 1994)
- June 10
  - Douglas Ley, 62, academic and politician, member of the New Hampshire House of Representatives (since 2012) (b. 1958)
  - Joyce MacKenzie, 95, actress (Broken Arrow, Tarzan and the She-Devil, Rails Into Laramie) (b. 1925)
- June 11
  - Vern Miller, 92, politician, Kansas Attorney General (1971–1975) (b. 1928)
  - John Gabriel, 90, actor (Ryan's Hope, Stagecoach, The Mary Tyler Moore Show)
- June 12
  - Dennis Berry, 76, film director (The Big Delirium, Chloé, Highlander: The Raven) (b. 1944)
  - Mudcat Grant, 85, baseball player (Cleveland Indians, Minnesota Twins, Oakland Athletics) (b. 1935)
  - Christopher Sign, 45, television journalist (KNXV-TV, WBMA-LD) (b. 1975)
  - John Marinatto, 64, college athletics commissioner, commissioner of the Big East Conference (2009–2012) (b. 1957)
- June 13 – Ned Beatty, 83, actor (Network, Deliverance, Toy Story 3) (b. 1937)
- June 14
  - Hessley Hempstead, 49, football player (Detroit Lions) (b. 1972)
  - Lisa Banes, 65, actress (Cocktail, Young Guns, Gone Girl) (b. 1955)
  - Philip Gannon, 98, educator, founder and president (1957–1989) of Lansing Community College.
  - Deona Marie Knajdek, 31, social activist (b. 1969/1970)
- June 15
  - Jack B. Weinstein, 99, jurist, judge (since 1967) and chief judge (1980–1988) of the U.S. District Court for the Eastern District of New York (b. 1921)
  - Anna C. Verna, 90, politician, member (1975–2012) and president (1999–2011) of the Philadelphia City Council (b. 1931)
- June 16
  - Frank Bonner, 79, actor (WKRP in Cincinnati, Just the Ten of Us) and television director (City Guys), (b. 1942)
  - Janet Malcolm, 86, journalist (The New Yorker, Psychoanalysis: The Impossible Profession, The Journalist and the Murderer), (b. 1934)
  - Norman Powell, 86, television executive and producer (24, Washington: Behind Closed Doors, Rafferty) (b. 1934)
  - Richard Stolley, 92, journalist and editor (People), (b. 1928)
  - Vance Trimble, 107, journalist (The Kentucky Post), Pulitzer Prize winner (1960) (b. 1913)
- June 17 – Alex Harvill, 28, motorcycle stuntman (b. 1992)
- June 18 – Billy Fuccillo, 64, car dealer and owner of Fuccillo Automotive Group (b. 1957)
- June 19 – Champ, 12, dog, presidential pet of Joe and Jill Biden (b. 2008)
- June 20 –
  - Joanne Linville, 93, actress ("The Enterprise Incident" episode of Star Trek, A Star Is Born, Scorpio) (b. 1928)
  - Anne Warner, 77, politician, member of the New Hampshire House of Representatives (b. 1943)
- June 21
  - Diego Cortez, 74, art curator (b. 1946)
  - Mark Doumit, 59, politician, member of the Washington House of Representatives and Senate (b. 1961)
  - Tom Kurvers, 58, ice hockey player (New York Islanders, Montreal Canadiens, New Jersey Devils), Stanley Cup champion (1986) (b. 1962)
- June 22
  - Patrick Allen, 59, football player (Houston Oilers) (b. 1961)
  - Jim Bessman, 68, music journalist (Billboard) (b. 1952)
  - Patricia Reilly Giff, 86, author (Lily's Crossing, Pictures of Hollis Woods) (b. 1935)
  - Richard H. Kyle, 84, judge, U.S. District Court for Minnesota (since 1992) (b. 1937)
- June 23
  - Mike Brooks, 66, journalist (CNN) (b. 1955)
  - John McAfee, 75, British-American computer programmer and businessman (McAfee Associates) (b. 1945)
  - Ellen McIlwaine, 75, American-born Canadian guitarist and blues singer (b. 1945)
  - Mike McLachlan, 75, politician, member of the Colorado House of Representatives (2013–2015) (b. 1946)
  - Bev Scalze, 77, politician, member of the Minnesota House of Representatives (2005–2013) and Senate (2013–2017) (b. 1943)
- June 24
  - Sonny Callahan, 88, politician, member of the U.S. House of Representatives (1985–2003), Alabama Senate (1979–1985) and House of Representatives (1971–1979) (b. 1932)
  - Stephen Dunn, 82, poet, Pulitzer Prize winner (2001) (b. 1939)
  - Frederick S. Humphries, 85, educator, president of Florida A&M University (1985–2001) (b. 1935)
- June 25
  - John Erman, 85, director (My Favorite Martian, Peyton Place, That Girl), Emmy winner (1983) (b. 1935)
  - Jack Ingram, 84, Hall of Fame racing driver, NASCAR Busch Grand National Series champion (1982, 1985) (b. 1936)
- June 26
  - Mike Gravel, 91, politician, member (1963–1967) and speaker (1965–1967) of the Alaska House of Representatives, U.S. Senator (1969–1981) (b. 1930)
  - Jon Hassell, 84, trumpeter and composer (b. 1937)
  - John Langley, 78, television producer (Cops) (b. 1943)
  - Frederic Rzewski, 83, composer and virtuoso pianist (The People United Will Never Be Defeated!) (b. 1938)
  - Johnny Solinger, 55, singer-songwriter (Skid Row) (b. 1965)
- June 27
  - Alison Greenspan, 48, film and television producer (Monte Carlo, The Best of Me, For Life) (b. 1972)
  - Steven Horwitz, 57, economist (b. 1964)
- June 28
  - Lauren Berlant, 63, scholar and writer (b. 1957)
  - Burton Greene, 84, jazz pianist (b. 1937)
  - Harry Johnston, 89, politician, member of the U.S. House of Representatives (1989–1997) (b. 1931)
  - Greg Noll, 84, surfer (b. 1937)
- June 29
  - Stuart Damon, 84, actor (General Hospital, The Champions, Port Charles) (b. 1937)
  - Elizabeth Martínez, 95, Chicana feminist (b. 1925)
  - Donald Rumsfeld, 88, politician, U.S. Representative (1963–1969), White House Chief of Staff (1974–1975), and two-time Secretary of Defense (1975–1977, 2001–2006) (b. 1932)
- June 30
  - Jimmy Fitzmorris, 99, politician, Lieutenant Governor of Louisiana (1972–1980) (b. 1921)
  - Janet Moreau, 93, track and field athlete, Olympic champion (1952) (b. 1927)
  - Bob Newland, 72, football player (New Orleans Saints) (b. 1948)
