= 2021 deaths in the United States (July–December) =

- Decades: 2000s; 2010s; 2020s; 2030s
- See also: History of the United States (2016–present); Timeline of United States history (2010–present); List of years in the United States

Deaths in the last half of the year 2021 in the United States. For the first half of the year, see 2021 deaths in the United States (January–June).

== July ==
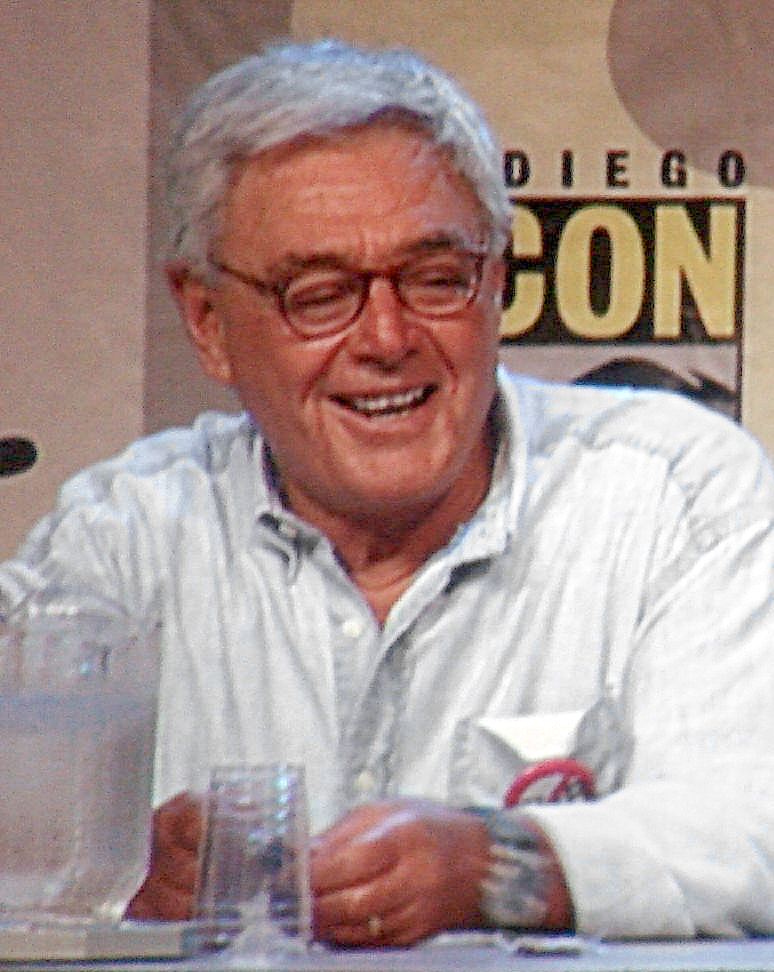
Richard Donner

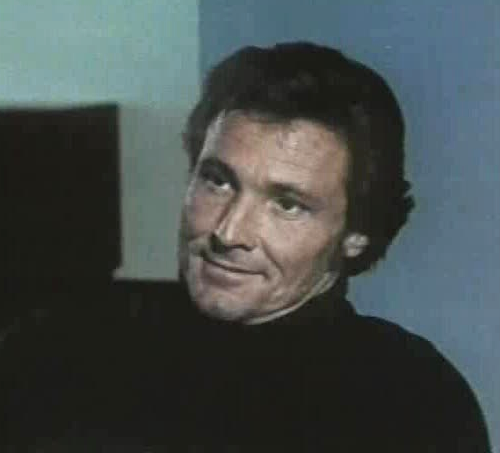
William Smith

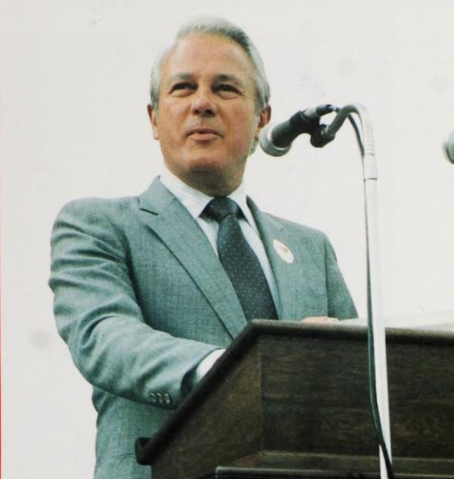
Edwin Edwards

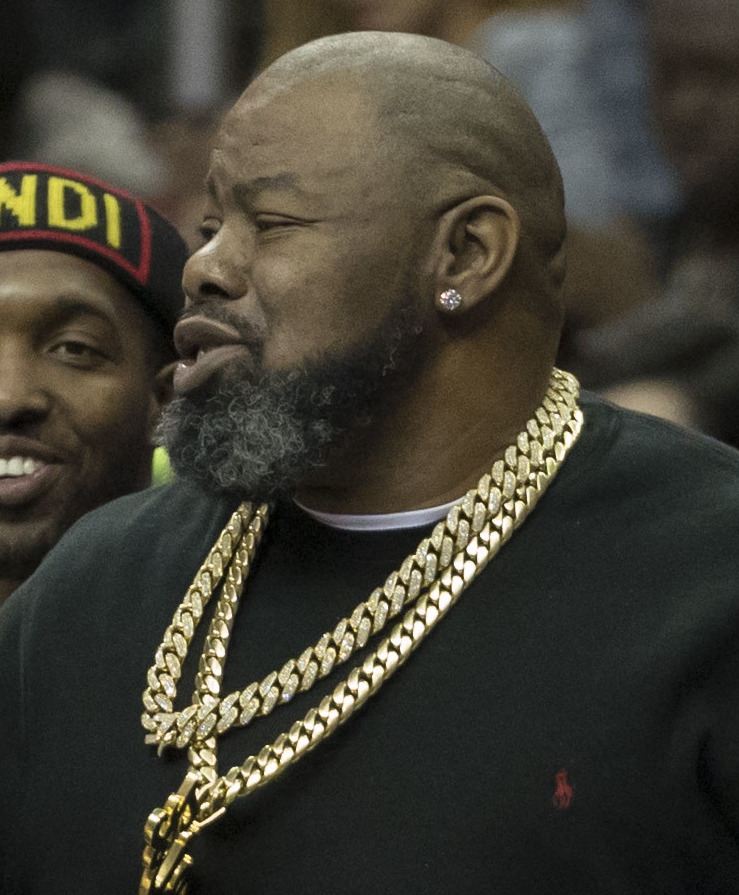
Biz Markie

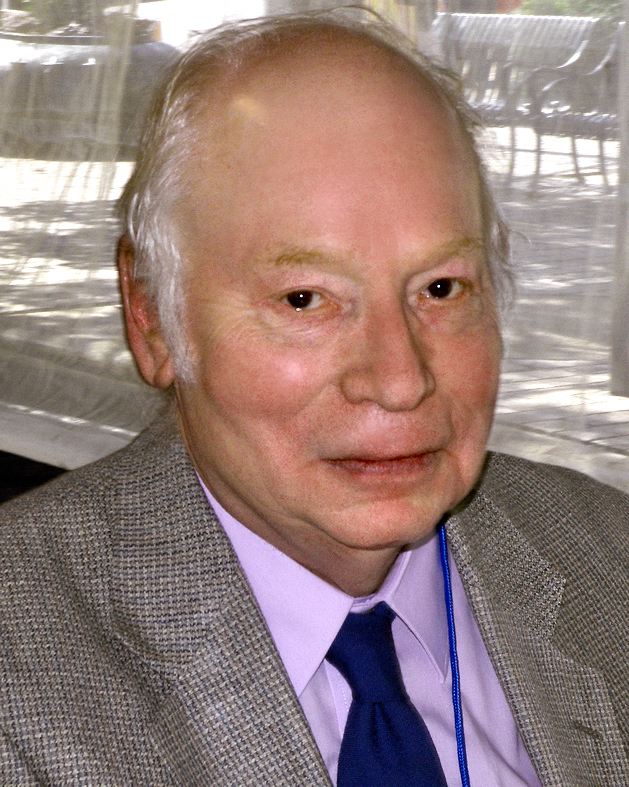
Steven Weinberg

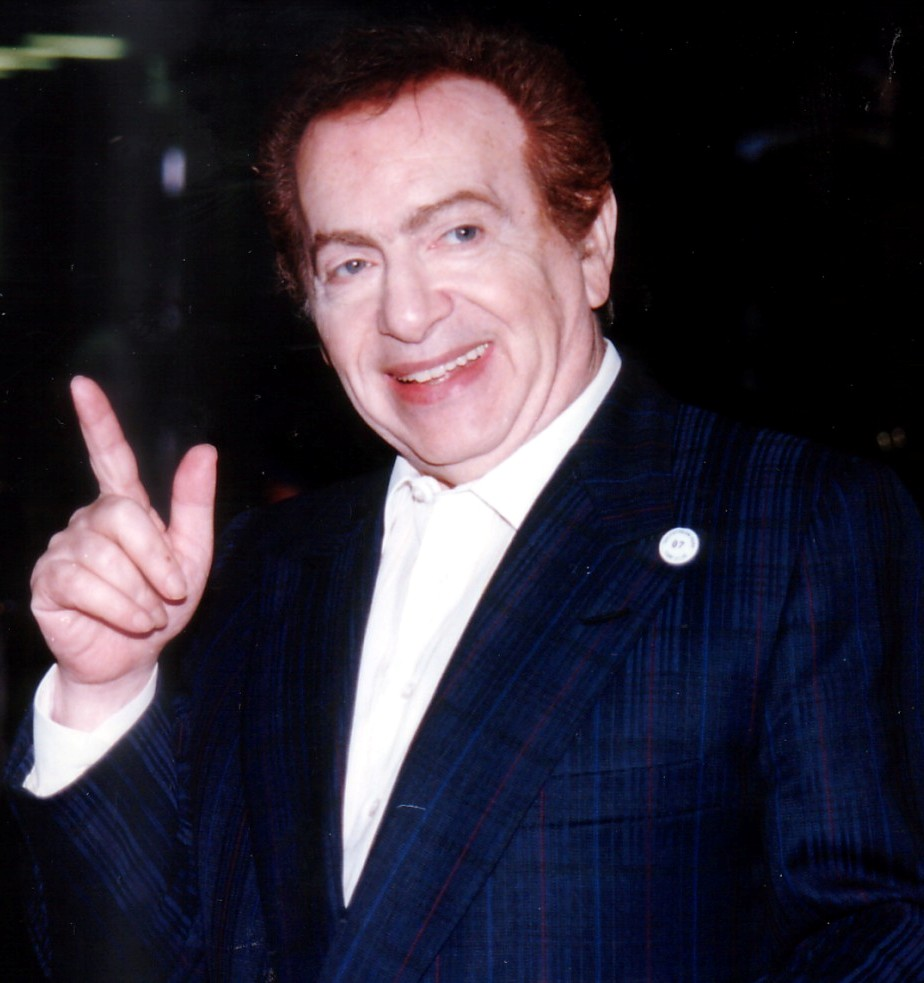
Jackie Mason

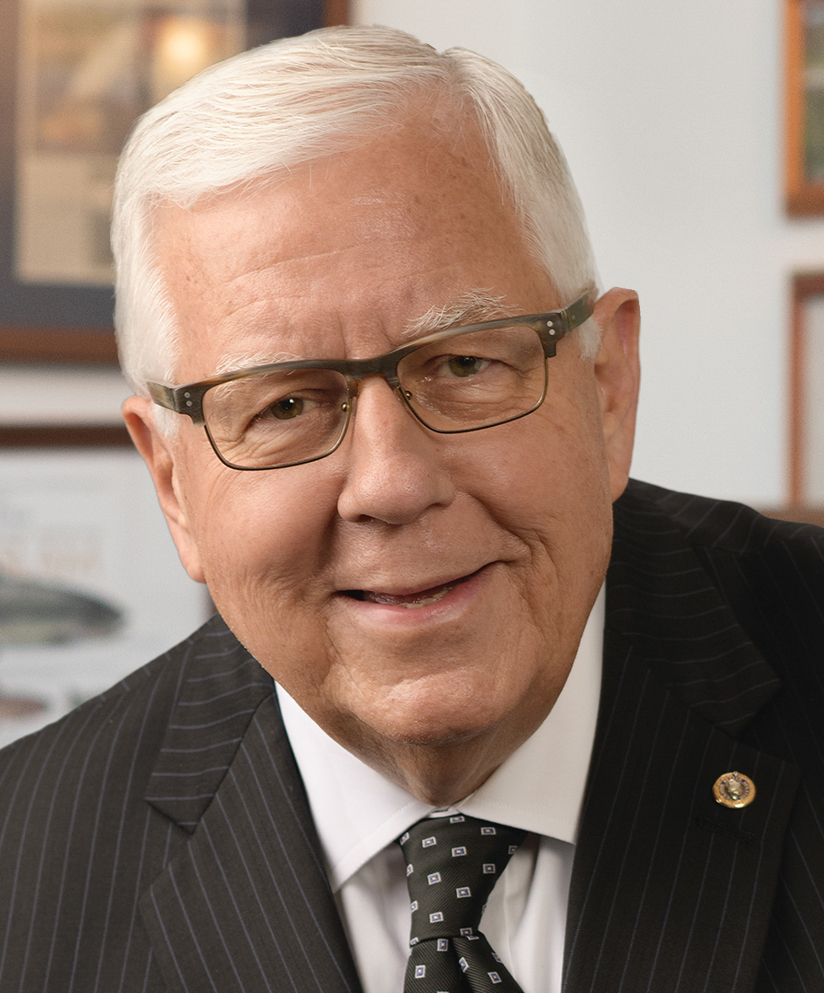
Mike Enzi

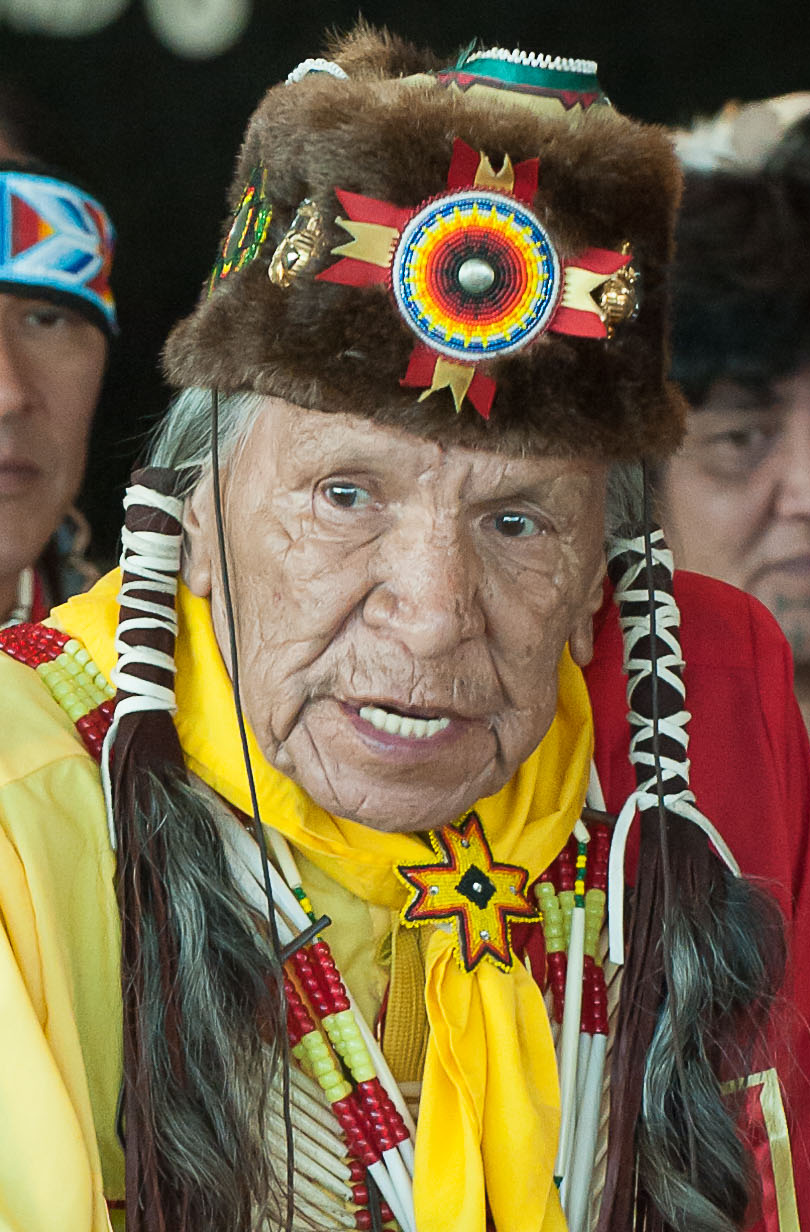
Saginaw Grant

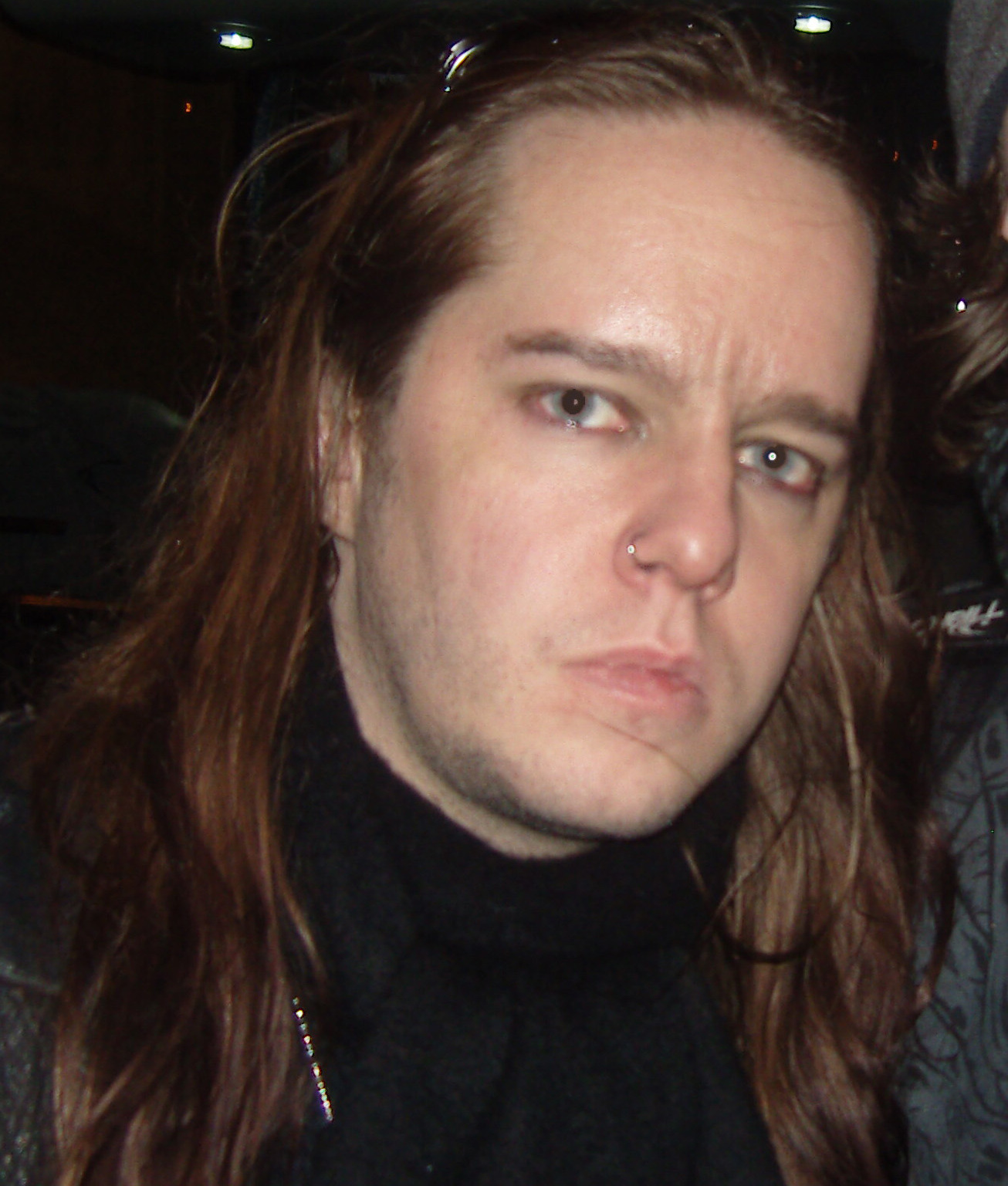
Joey Jordison

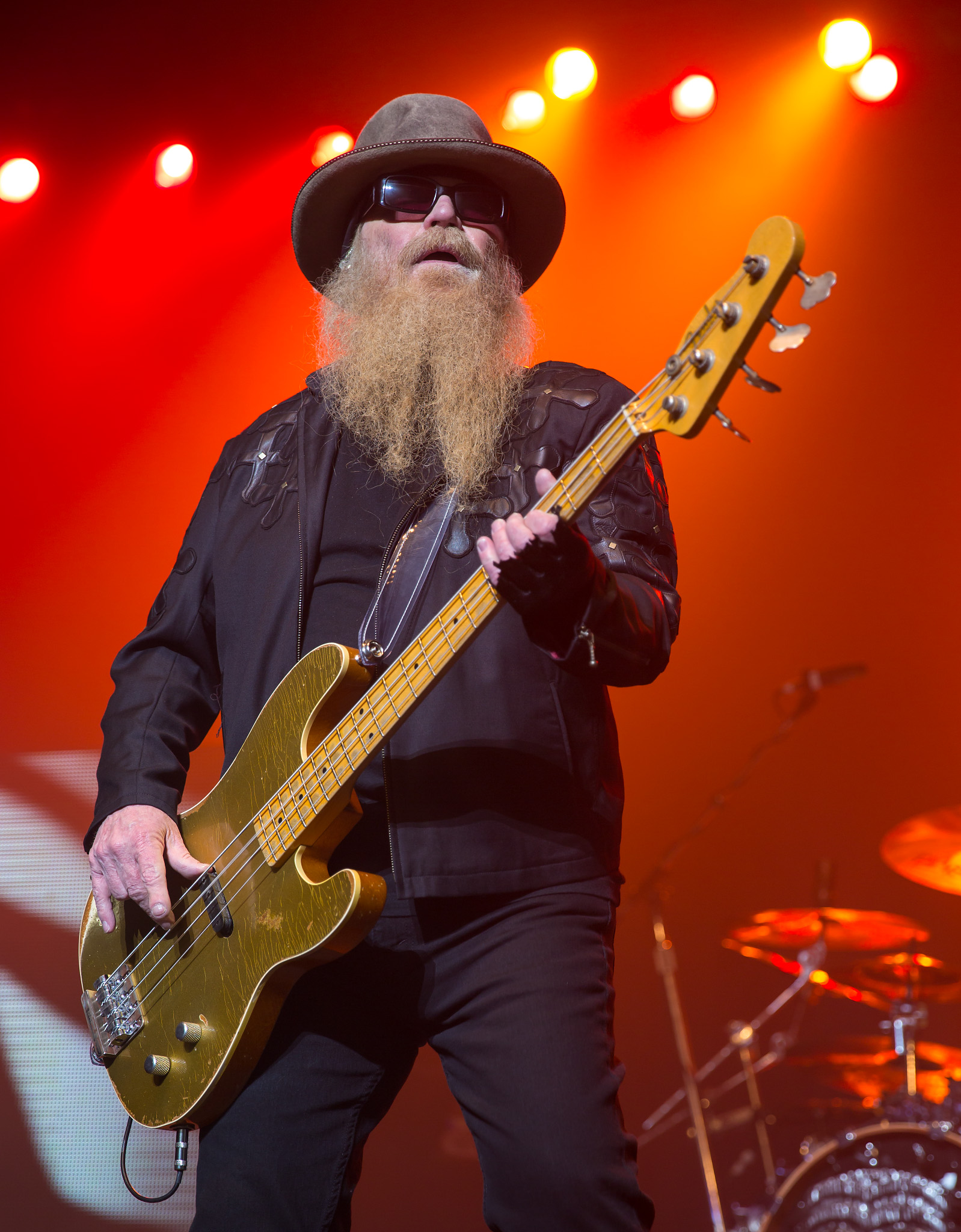
Dusty Hill

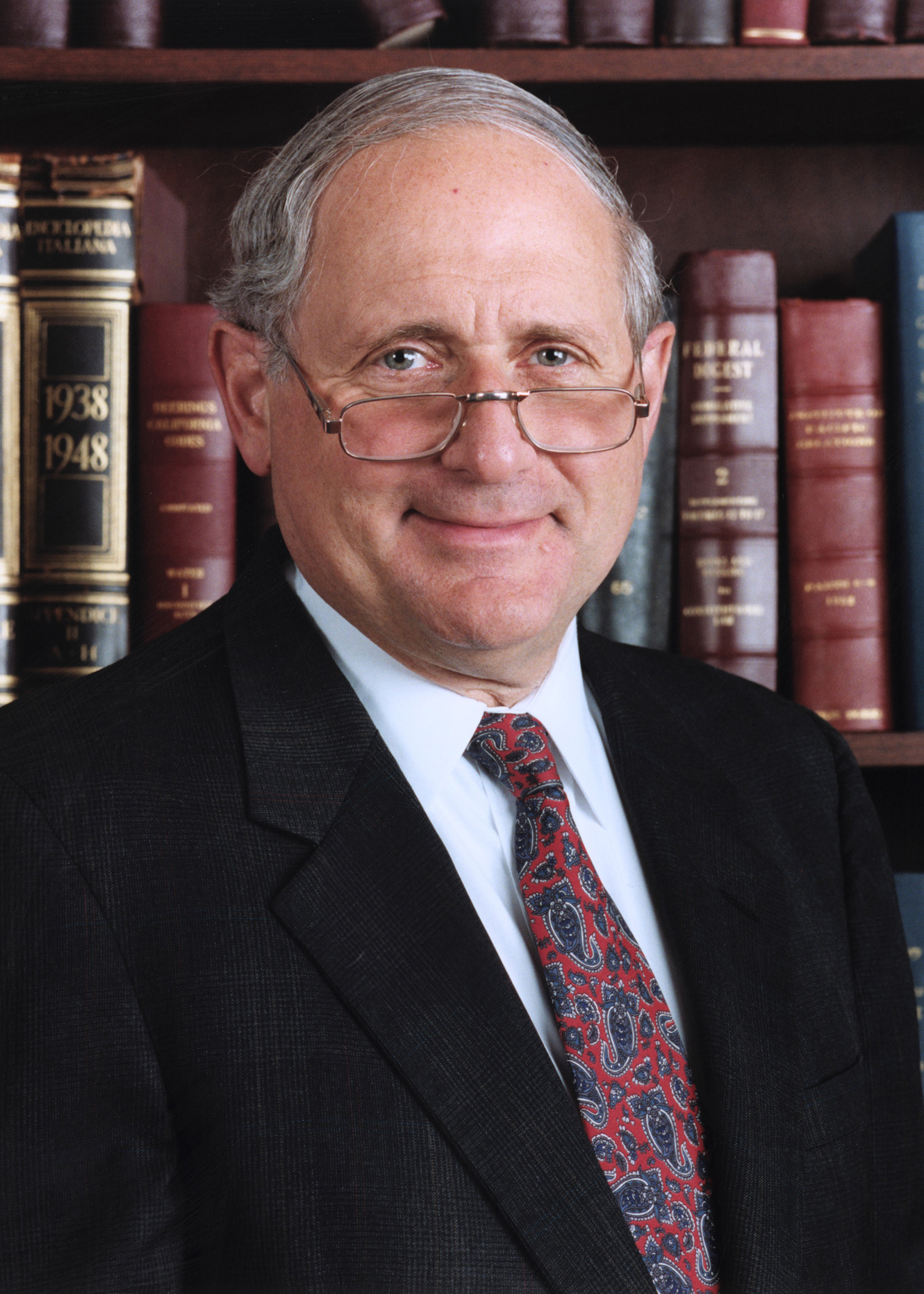
Carl Levin

- July 1 – The Patriot, 59, professional wrestler (AWA, AJPW, WWF) (b. 1961)
- July 3
  - Robert Correia, 82, politician, mayor of Fall River (2008–2010) and member of the Massachusetts House of Representatives (1977–2008) (b. 1939)
  - Haunani-Kay Trask, 71 American-born Hawaiian nationalist and author (b. 1949)
- July 4
  - Sanford Clark, 85, rockabilly singer ("The Fool", "Houston") (b. 1935)
  - Terry Donahue, 77, Hall of Fame college football coach (UCLA Bruins) and executive (San Francisco 49ers) (b.1944)
  - Dennis Gorski, 76, politician, member of the New York State Assembly (1975–1987), Erie County, New York executive (1988–1999) (b. 1944)
  - Anne H. Hopkins, 79, academic administrator and president of University of North Florida (b. 1941)
  - Richard Lewontin, 92, evolutionary biologist (b. 1929)
- July 5
  - Didi Contractor, 91, German-American architect (b. 1929)
  - Richard Donner, 91, film and television director and producer (The Goonies, Tales from the Crypt, Lethal Weapon films) (b. 1930)
  - James Kallstrom, 78, FBI agent and television host (The FBI Files) (b. 1943)
  - William Smith, actor (Laredo, Rich Man, Poor Man) (b. 1933)
- July 6
  - Tom Buford, 72, politician, member of the Kentucky Senate (since 1991) (b. 1949)
  - Suzzanne Douglas, 64, actress (The Parent 'Hood, How Stella Got Her Groove Back, Jason's Lyric) (b. 1957)
  - William H. Pauley III, 68, judge for the U.S. District Court for the Southern District of New York (1998–2018), senior judge (since 2018).
- July 7
  - Greg Clark, 49, football player (San Francisco 49ers) (b. 1972)
  - Robert Downey Sr., 85, actor (To Live and Die in L.A.), film director (Up the Academy, Putney Swope), and producer (b. 1936)
  - Bob F. Griffin, 85, politician, member (1971–1996) and speaker (1981–1996) of the Missouri House of Representatives (b. 1935)
  - Priscilla Johnson McMillan, 92, historian and journalist (b. 1928)
  - Eddie Payne, 69, college basketball coach (USC Upstate Spartans, Oregon State Beavers, East Carolina Pirates) (b. 1951)
  - Chick Vennera, 74, actor (Yanks, The Milagro Beanfield War, Animaniacs) (b. 1947)
  - Chris Youngblood, 55, professional wrestler (WWC, FMW) (b. 1966)
- July 8 – Walter Thomas McGovern, 99, jurist and senior judge of the United States District Court for the Western District of Washington (since 1987) (b. 1922)
- July 10
  - Byron Berline, 77, fiddle player (b.1944)
  - David Carter, 67, football player (Houston Oilers, New Orleans Saints) (b. 1953)
  - Gwendolyn Faison, 96, politician, mayor of Camden, New Jersey (2000–2010) (b. 1925)
  - Travis Fulton, 44, mixed martial artist (b. 1977)
  - Sonny Jackson, 82, college football coach (Nicholls Colonels, McNeese State Cowboys) (b. 1938)
- July 11
  - Charlie Robinson, 75, actor (Night Court, Love & War) (b. 1945)
  - Jerry Steele, 82, basketball coach (Guilford Quakers, Carolina Cougars, High Point Panthers) (b. 1939)
- July 12
  - Edwin Edwards, 93, politician, U.S. Representative and four-time Governor of Louisiana (b. 1927)
  - Bertram Firestone, 89, industrial real estate developer, thoroughbred breeder and horse owner (Genuine Risk) (b. 1931)
  - Alex Gibbs, 80, football coach (Denver Broncos, Atlanta Falcons) (b. 1941)
  - Paul Orndorff, 71, professional wrestler (WWF, WCW) (b. 1949)
  - Joshua Perper, 88, Romanian-born pathologist and toxicologist, chief medical examiner of Broward County, Florida (1994–2011) (b. 1932)
  - John L. Rotz, 86, Hall of Fame jockey (b. 1934)
- July 13
  - Shirley Fry, 94, Hall of Fame tennis player (b. 1927)
  - Margaret Richardson, 78, lawyer and public official, commissioner of internal revenue (1993–1997) (b. 1943)
- July 14
  - Sam Belnavis, 81, automobile racing executive (b. 1939)
  - Dan Forestal, 38, politician, member of the Indiana House of Representatives (2012–2020) (b. 1983)
  - Jeff LaBar, 58, rock guitarist (Cinderella, Naked Beggars) (b. 1963)
  - Julian L. Lapides, 89, politician, member of the Maryland House of Delegates (1963–1967) and senate (1967–1994) (b. 1931)
- July 15
  - Yoel Kahn, 91, Russian-born Chabad rabbi (b. 1930)
  - Jean Kraft, 94, mezzo-soprano (b. 1927)
  - Jerry Lewis, 86, politician, member of the California State Assembly (1969–1978) and U.S. House of Representatives (1979–2013), chair of the House Appropriations Committee (2005–2007) (b. 1934)
  - Dennis Murphy, 94, sports entrepreneur, co-founder of the American Basketball Association and World Hockey Association (b. 1926)
  - Gloria Richardson, 99, civil rights activist (Cambridge movement) (b. 1922)
  - Hugo F. Sonnenschein, 80, economist (Sonnenschein–Mantel–Debreu theorem) (b. 1940)
- July 16
  - Doug Bennett, 75, politician, member of the Michigan House of Representatives (2005–2010) (b. 1946)
  - Stephen Hickman, 72, illustrator (b. 1949)
  - Biz Markie, rapper ("Just a Friend") (b. 1964)
  - Harry M. Rosenfeld, 91, newspaper editor (The Washington Post) (b. 1929)
- July 17
  - John "Bam" Carney, 51, politician, member of the Kentucky House of Representatives (since 2009) (b.1969)
  - Mat George, 26, podcast host (b. 1995)
  - Robby Steinhardt, 71, singer and violinist (Kansas) (b. 1950
- July 18 – Bernie Hansen, 76, politician, member of the Chicago City Council (1983–2002) (b. 1944)
- July 19
  - Layne Flack, 52, poker player (b. 1969)
  - Jenny Lynn, 49, bodybuilder (b. 1972)
  - Chuck E. Weiss, 76, songwriter and vocalist (b. 1945)
- July 22
  - Greg Knapp, 58, football coach (New York Jets, Atlanta Falcons) (b. 1963)
  - Gary Leif, 64, politician, member of the Oregon House of Representatives (since 2018) (b. 1957)
- July 23
  - David Lust, 53, politician, member of the South Dakota House of Representatives (2007–2015, 2016–2019) (b. 1968)
  - Steven Weinberg, 88, theoretical physicist, Nobel Prize laureate (1979) (b. 1933)
- July 24
  - Rodney Alcala, 77, serial killer (b. 1943)
  - Jackie Mason, 93, comedian and actor (The Simpsons, The Jerk, Caddyshack II) (b. 1928)
- July 26
  - Rick Aiello, 65, actor (Twin Peaks: Fire Walk with Me, Do the Right Thing, The Sopranos) (b. 1955)
  - Albert Bandura, psychologist (b. 1925)
  - Mike Enzi, 77, politician, United States Senator from Wyoming (1997–2021) (b. 1944)
  - Mike Howe, 55, heavy metal singer (Metal Church, Heretic) (b. 1965)
  - Joey Jordison, 46, heavy metal drummer (Slipknot, Murderdolls, Sinsaenum) (b. 1975)
  - David Von Ancken, 56, television and film director (Seraphim Falls, Tut, The Vampire Diaries) (b. 1965)
- July 27
  - Jack Carlisle, 91, college football coach (East Tennessee State) (b. 1929)
  - Saginaw Grant, 85, actor (The World's Fastest Indian, The Lone Ranger, "Ozymandias" episode of Breaking Bad) (b. 1936)
  - Dusty Hill, 72, Hall of Fame musician (ZZ Top) and songwriter ("Tush") (b. 1949)
- July 28
  - Wade Cook, 71, author.
  - Nancy Frankel, 92, sculptor (b. 1929)
  - Pete George, 92, weightlifter, Olympic champion (1952) (b. 1929)
  - Ron Popeil, 86, inventor and businessman (Ronco) (b. 1935)
- July 29
  - Robert Dove, 82, politician and academic, parliamentarian of the United States Senate (1981–1987, 1995–2001) (b. 1938)
  - Richard Lamm, 85, politician, governor of Colorado (1975–1987) (b. 1935)
  - John Landon, 71, politician, member of the Iowa House of Representatives (since 2013) (b. 1950)
  - Carl Levin, 87, politician, United States Senator from Michigan (1979–2015) (b. 1934)
  - Janice Mirikitani, 80, poet and political activist (b. 1941)
  - Lin-J Shell, 39, football player (Orlando Predators, Toronto Argonauts, BC Lions) (b. 1981)
- July 30
  - Jack Couffer, 96, film director (Ring of Bright Water), second unit director (Out of Africa), and cinematographer (Jonathan Livingston Seagull) (b. 1924)
  - Jay Pickett, 60, actor (Rush Week, Eve of Destruction, Rumpelstiltskin) (b. 1961)
  - Thea White, 81, voice actress (Courage the Cowardly Dog) (b. 1940)
- July 31
  - Charles Connor, 86, drummer (Little Richard) (b. 1935)
  - Alvin Ing, 89, singer and actor (The Final Countdown, Stir Crazy, The Gambler) (b. 1932)
  - Mark Tarlov, 69, film producer (Christine, Copycat), director (Simply Irresistible), and winemaker (b. 1952)

== August ==
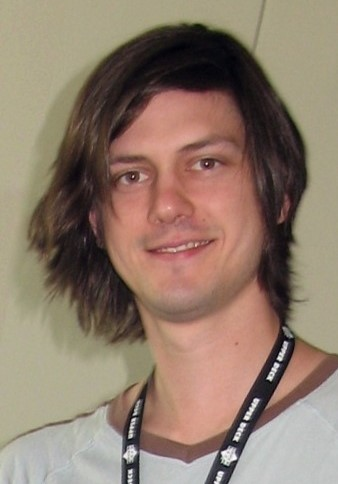
Trevor Moore

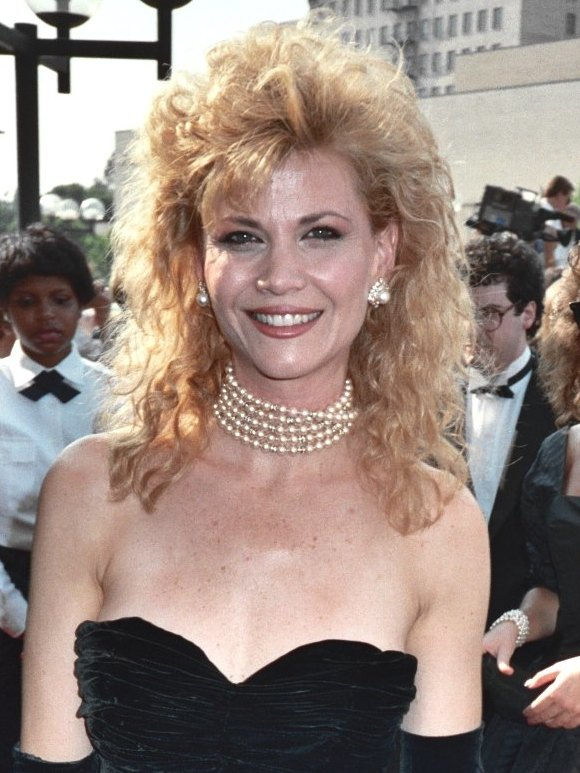
Markie Post

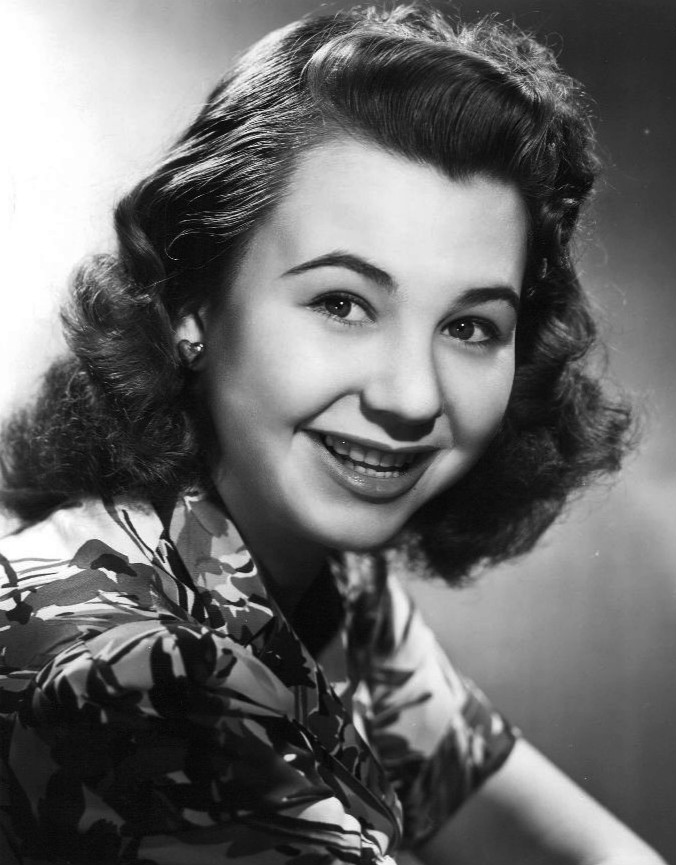
Jane Withers

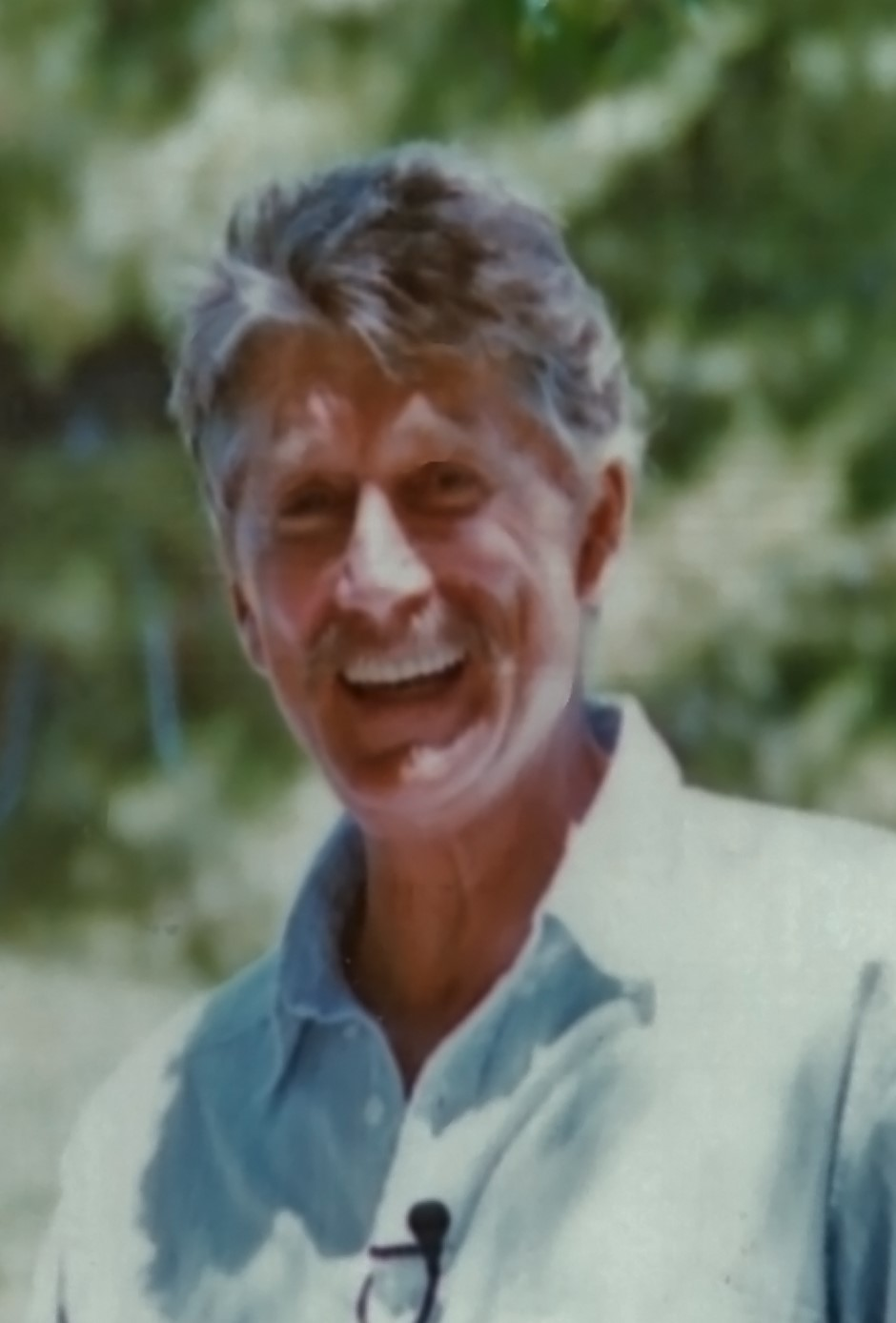
Alex Cord

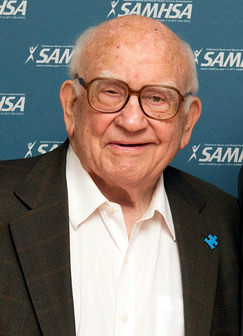
Ed Asner

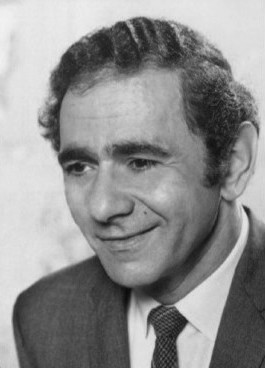
Michael Constantine

- August 1
  - Paul Cotton, 78, singer-songwriter and guitarist (Poco) (b. 1943)
  - June Daugherty, 64, college basketball coach (Boise State Broncos, Washington Huskies, Washington State Cougars) (b. 1956)
  - Abe E. Pierce III, 86, politician, mayor of Monroe, Louisiana (1996–2000) (b. 1934)
  - Tom York, 96, television personality (WBRC) (b. 1924)
  - John Zulberti, 54, college lacrosse player (Syracuse Orange) (b. 1967)
- August 2 – Runoko Rashidi, 67, historian, author and scholar (b. 1954)
- August 3
  - Jerry Carter, 66, politician and pastor, member of the North Carolina House of Representatives (since 2019) (b. 1954–1955)
  - Jody Hamilton, 82, professional wrestler (GCW), promoter (DSW) and trainer (WCW Power Plant) (b. 1938)
  - Kelli Hand, 56, musician and DJ (b. 1965)
- August 4
  - Razzy Bailey, 82, country musician ("Midnight Hauler", "She Left Love All Over Me", "I Keep Coming Back") (b. 1939)
  - Bobby Eaton, 62, professional wrestler (Jim Crockett Promotions, WCW, SMW) (b. 1958)
  - Richard T. Farmer, 86, businessman and philanthropist, founder and CEO of Cintas (1968–2003) (b. 1934 or 1935)
  - Paul Johnson, 50, DJ ("Get Get Down") and record producer (b. 1971)
  - John H. Logie, 81, politician, mayor of Grand Rapids, Michigan (1991–2003) (b. 1939)
  - J. R. Richard, 71, baseball player (Houston Astros) (b. 1950)
  - Dave Severance, 102, Marine Corps colonel (Battle of Iwo Jima) (b. 1919)
  - Betty Lou Varnum, 90, television presenter (The Magic Window) (b. 1931)
  - Tachi Yamada, 76, Japanese-born American physician and gastroenterologist (b. 1945)
- August 5
  - Eloise Greenfield, 91, author (b. 1929)
  - Richard Trumka, 72, labor leader, president of the AFL–CIO (since 2009) and the United Mine Workers (1982–1995) (b. 1949)
  - Vito Valentinetti, 92, baseball player (Chicago Cubs, Washington Senators, Cleveland Indians) (b. 1928)
  - Walter Wangerin Jr., 77, author (The Book of the Dun Cow) (b. 1944)
- August 6
  - Rita Pitka Blumenstein, 88, Yup'ik traditional healer (b. 1933)
  - Ed Emery, 71, politician, member of the Missouri House of Representatives (2003–2011) and Senate (2013–2021) (b. 1950)
  - Donald Kagan, 89, Lithuanian-born American historian (b. 1932)
  - Trevor Moore, 41, comedian (The Whitest Kids U' Know) and actor (Miss March) (b. 1980)
  - John A. Rizzo, 73, attorney (b. 1947)
  - Herbert Schlosser, 95, president and CEO of NBC and co-founder of A&E (b. 1926)
- August 7
  - Paul Bragdon, 94, academic (b. 1927)
  - Mike De Palmer, 59, tennis player and coach (Boris Becker) (b. 1961)
  - Markie Post, 70, actress (Night Court, The Fall Guy, Hearts Afire) (b. 1950)
  - Dennis Thomas, 70, saxophonist (Kool & the Gang) (b. 1951)
  - Jane Withers, 95, actress (Bright Eyes, Ginger, Giant) and children's radio show host (b. 1926)
- August 8
  - Bobby Bowden, 91, Hall of Fame college football coach (Florida State, West Virginia) (b. 1929)
  - Lila R. Gleitman, 91, academic (University of Pennsylvania) (b. 1929)
  - Ben Kamin, 68, rabbi (b. 1953)
  - Pierre Sprey, 84, French-born American defense analyst (Fighter Mafia) and record producer, founder of Mapleshade Records (b. 1937)
  - Walter Yetnikoff, 87, music industry executive (CBS Records International) (b. 1933)
- August 9
  - Rand Araskog, 89, businessman, CEO of ITT Corporation (1979–1998) (b. 1931)
  - Cameron Burrell, 26, sprinter (b. 1994)
  - Carlton H. Colwell, 95, politician, member of the Georgia House of Representatives (1964–1995) (b. 1926)
  - Alex Cord, 88, actor (Airwolf, Stagecoach, The Brotherhood) (b. 1933)
  - Neal Craig, 73, football player (Cincinnati Bengals, Buffalo Bills, Cleveland Browns) (b. 1948)
  - Roy F. Guste, 69, author, photographer, and culinary historian (b. 1951)
  - Pat Hitchcock, 93, English-born American actress (Stage Fright, Strangers on a Train, Psycho) (b. 1928)
  - Bob Jenkins, 73, motorsports announcer (ESPN, ABC, NBC Sports) (b. 1947)
  - Joseph Koterski, 67, Jesuit priest, philosopher and author (b. 1953)
  - Craig Ogletree, 53, football player (Cincinnati Bengals) (b. 1968)
  - Chucky Thompson, 53, record producer (Bad Boy Records) (b. 1968)
- August 10
  - Neal Conan, 71, radio journalist (Talk of the Nation) (b. 1949)
  - Tony Esposito, 78, Canadian-American Hall of Fame ice hockey player (Chicago Blackhawks, Montreal Canadiens), Stanley Cup champion (1969) (b. 1943)
- August 11 – Mike Finnigan, 76, keyboardist and vocalist (b. 1945)
- August 12
  - Dominic DeNucci, 89, Hall of Fame professional wrestler (Stampede Wrestling, NWA, WWWF) (b. 1932)
  - Roger Harring, 88, Hall of Fame college football coach (Wisconsin-La Crosse) (b. 1932)
- August 13
  - Kelsey Begaye, 70, politician, president of the Navajo Nation (1999–2003) (b. 1951)
  - Paula Bradley, 96, politician, member of the New Hampshire House of Representatives (2014–2016) (b. 1924)
  - Nanci Griffith, 68, singer-songwriter (b. 1953)
  - James Hormel, 88, philanthropist, LGBT activist and diplomat, ambassador to Luxembourg (1999–2001) (b. 1933)
  - Rich Milot, 64, football player (Washington Redskins), Super Bowl champion (1982, 1987) (b. 1957)
  - Steve Perrin, 75, game designer (RuneQuest), technical writer and editor (b. 1946)
  - Fez Whatley, 57, comedian and radio host (The Ron and Fez Show) (b. 1964)
- August 14
  - Keith Patchel, 65, musician and composer (b. 1955–1956) (death announced on this date)
  - Mickey Stephens, 77, politician, member of the Georgia House of Representatives (since 2009) (b. 1944)
- August 15
  - Hiro, 90, Japanese-born American commercial photographer (b. 1930)
  - Paul Mitchell, 64, businessman and politician, member of the U.S. House of Representatives (2017–2021) (b. 1956)
  - Dick Schafrath, 84, football player (Cleveland Browns) and politician, member of the Ohio Senate (1987–2000) (b. 1937)
  - Joe Walton, 85, football player (Washington Redskins, New York Giants) and coach (New York Jets) (b. 1935)
- August 16
  - Stanley Aronowitz, 88, political activist and lecturer (b. 1933)
  - William R. Haine, 77, politician, member of the Illinois Senate (2002–2019) (b. 1944)
  - Paul Muegge, 84, politician, member of the Oklahoma Senate (1990–2002) (b. 1936)
  - John Pease, 77, football coach (b. 1943)
  - Lucille Times, 99, civil rights activist (b. 1922)
- August 17
  - Chong-Sik Lee, 90, North Korean-born American political scientist (b. 1931)
  - Robert Orr, 68, business executive, ambassador to the Asian Development Bank (2010–2016) (b. 1953)
  - Leonard Thompson, 69, football player (Detroit Lions) (b. 1952)
- August 18
  - Solly Drake, 90, baseball player (Chicago Cubs, Los Angeles Dodgers, Philadelphia Phillies) (b. 1930)
  - Joseph L. Galloway, 79, newspaper correspondent and columnist (b. 1941)
  - B. Wayne Hughes, 87, businessman, founder of Public Storage (b. 1933)
  - Robert Smith, 85, sport executive and administrator, president of the International Baseball Federation (1981–1993) (b. 1936)
  - Kaari Upson, 51, artist (b. 1970)
- August 19
  - Chuck Close, 81, photorealist painter (b. 1940)
  - Bill Freehan, 79, baseball player (Detroit Tigers) and coach (Michigan Wolverines), World Series champion (1968), b. 1941
  - James W. Loewen, 79, sociologist, historian, and author (b. 1942)
  - Ramo Stott, 87, racing driver (b. 1934)
  - Jean Yokum, 90, financial executive (b. 1931)
- August 20
  - Ian Carey, 45, DJ and record producer (b. 1975)
  - Tom T. Hall, 85, Hall of Fame singer-songwriter ("Harper Valley PTA", "I Love", "The Year That Clayton Delaney Died") (b. 1936)
  - Mark Hamister, 69, arena football executive, owner of the Buffalo Destroyers (1999–2003) and Rochester Brigade (2001–2003) (b. 1952)
  - Larry Harlow, 82, salsa musician and composer (b. 1939)
  - Michael Morgan, 63, conductor (b. 1957)
  - Igor Vovkovinskiy, 38, Ukrainian-born American law student and actor (b. 1982)
  - Brent Yonts, 72, politician, member of the Kentucky House of Representatives (1997–2016) (b. 1949)
- August 21
  - Nickolas Davatzes, 79, television executive (A&E Networks) (b. 1942)
  - Bill Emerson, 83, five-string banjo player (b. 1938)
  - Don Everly, 84, Hall of Fame singer (The Everly Brothers) and songwriter ("Cathy's Clown", "When Will I Be Loved") (b. 1937)
  - Connie Hamzy, 66, groupie (b. 1955)
  - Thad McClammy, 78, politician, member of the Alabama House of Representatives (since 1994) (b. 1942)
  - Floyd Reese, 73, football player (Montreal Alouettes), coach (Minnesota Vikings) and executive (Tennessee Titans) (b. 1948)
  - Jeanne Robertson, 77, humorist, motivational speaker and Miss North Carolina 1963 (b. 1943)
  - Guy Sansaricq, 86, Haitian-born American Roman Catholic prelate, auxiliary bishop of Brooklyn (2006–2010) (b. 1934)
  - Frank L. Schmidt, 77, psychology professor (University of Iowa) (b. 1944)
  - Anthony Scotto, 87, mobster (Gambino crime family) (b. 1934)
  - Phil Valentine, 61, talk radio show host (WWTN) (b. 1951)
- August 22
  - William J. Boarman, 75, printer, public printer of the U.S. (2010–2012) (b. 1946)
  - Kay Bullitt, 96, activist and philanthropist (b. 1925)
  - Vivian Caver, 93, politician, member of the Washington House of Representatives (1994–1995) (b. 1928)
  - Lloyd Dobyns, 85, news reporter (NBC News) (b. 1936)
  - Marilyn Eastman, 87, actress (Night of the Living Dead) (b. 1933)
  - Micki Grant, 80, playwright (Your Arms Too Short to Box with God, Working) and actress (Another World) (b. 1941)
  - Jack Hirschman, 87, poet and social activist (b. 1933)
  - Powell St. John, 80, singer and songwriter (Mother Earth) (b. 1940)
  - Eric Wagner, 62, heavy metal singer (Trouble) (b. 1959)
- August 23
  - Brick Bronsky, 57, professional wrestler (Stampede) and actor (Troma, The Quest) (b. 1964)
  - Tom Flynn, 66, author, novelist and editor (Free Inquiry), executive director of the Council for Secular Humanism (b. 1955)
  - Michael Gage, 76, politician, member of the California State Assembly (1976–1980) (b. 1945)
  - Robert Gerhart, 100, politician, member of the Pennsylvania House of Representatives (1967–1968) and Senate (1969–1972) (b. 1920)
  - Jimmy Hayes, 31, ice hockey player (Boston Bruins, Florida Panthers, Chicago Blackhawks) (b. 1989)
  - Michael Nader, 76, actor (Dynasty, All My Children, Fled) (b. 1945)
- August 24
  - Dale Derby, 72, physician and politician, member of the Oklahoma House of Representatives (2016–2018) (b. 1949)
  - Nicholas Felice, 94, politician, member of the New Jersey General Assembly (1982–2002), mayor of Fair Lawn, New Jersey (1972–1974) (b. 1927)
  - Jerry Harkness, 81, basketball player (Indiana Pacers, New York Knicks), NCAA champion (1963) (b. 1940)
  - John Sheridan, 75, jazz pianist and arranger (b. 1946)
  - George S. Vest, 102, diplomat, ambassador to the European Union (1981–1985) (b. 1918)
- August 25 – Robin Miller, 71, motorsports journalist (Indianapolis Star, Speed Channel, NBCSN) (b. 1950)
- August 26
  - Neal Brendel, 66, rugby union player (national team) (b. 1954)
  - Kenny Malone, 83, drummer (b. 1938)
  - Stanley A. Weiss, 94, mining executive and writer, founder of Business Executives for National Security (b. 1926)
- August 27
  - Edmond H. Fischer, 101, Nobel Prize winning biochemist, Nobel Prize laureate (1992) (b. 1920)
  - Hae Un Lee, 79, South Korean-born American businessman, founder of Lee's Discount Liquor (b. 1942)
  - Sam Salter, 46, R&B singer (b. 1975)
  - L. Neil Smith, 75, science fiction author (The Lando Calrissian Adventures) (b. 1946)
  - Lucille Whipper, 93, politician, member of the South Carolina House of Representatives (1985–1995) (b. 1928)
- August 28 – Ida Keeling, 106, centenarian track and field athlete (b. 1915)
- August 29
  - Ed Asner, 91, actor (The Mary Tyler Moore Show, Elf, Up), president of the Screen Actors Guild (1981–1985), seven-time Emmy winner (b. 1929)
  - Ron Bushy, 79, drummer (Iron Butterfly) (b. 1941)
  - Peggy Farrell, 89, costume designer (Dog Day Afternoon, Holocaust, The Stepford Wives), Emmy winner (1978) (b. 1932)
  - John A. Kaneb, 86, businessman, CEO of HP Hood, part-owner of the Boston Red Sox (b. 1934)
- August 30
  - Junior Coffey, 79, football player (Green Bay Packers, Atlanta Falcons, New York Giants) (b. 1942)
  - Cecil Souders, 100, football player (Detroit Lions) (b. 1921)
  - Robert David Steele, 69, CIA officer and conspiracy theorist (b. 1952)
  - Lee Williams, 75, gospel singer (b. 1946)
- August 31
  - Michael Constantine, actor (b. 1927)
  - Julie Ditty, 42, tennis player (b. 1979)
  - George S. Tolley, 95, agricultural economist (b. 1925)

== September ==
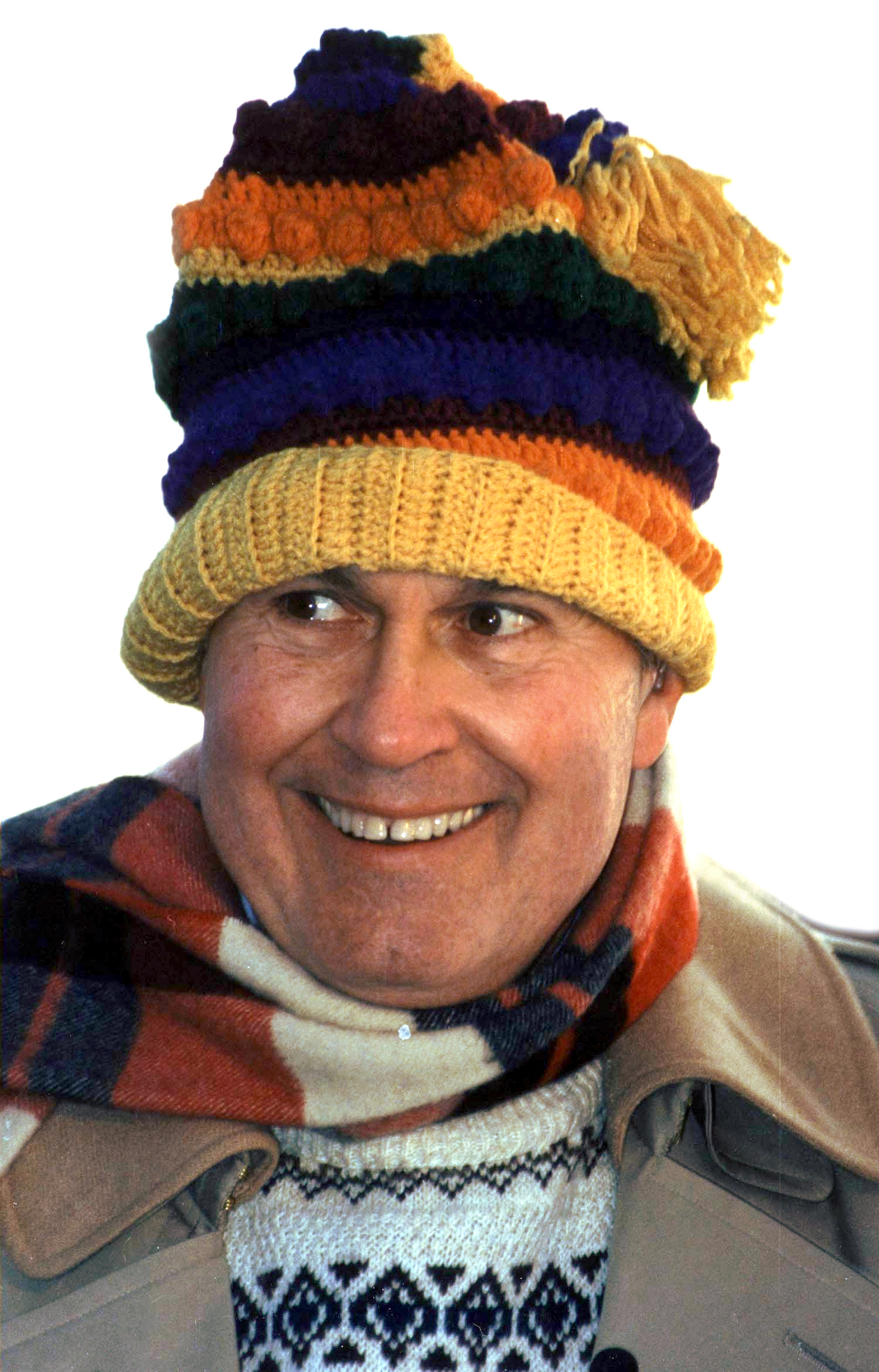
Willard Scott

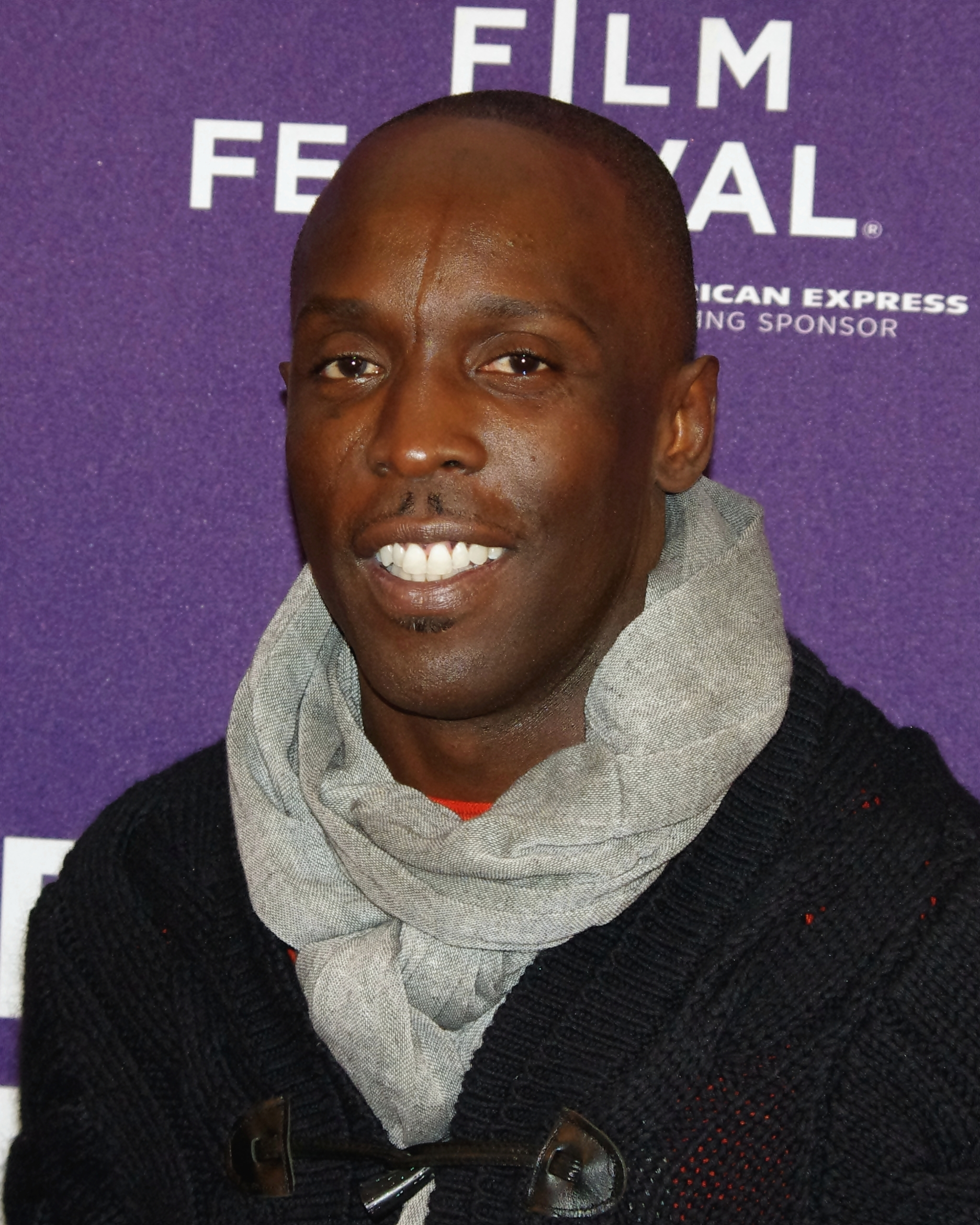
Michael K. Williams

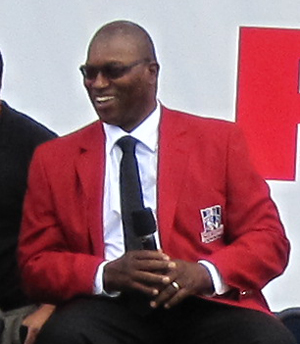
Sam Cunningham

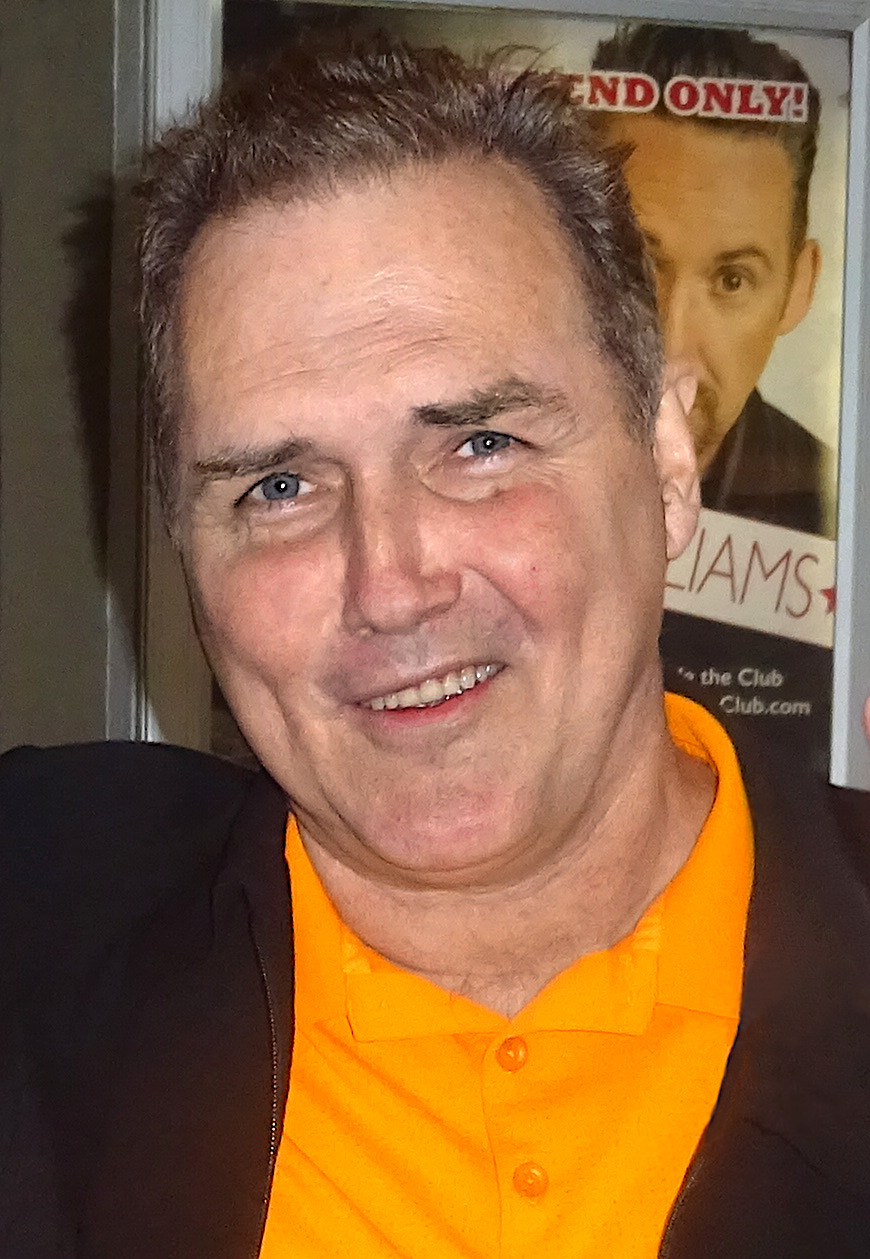
Norm Macdonald

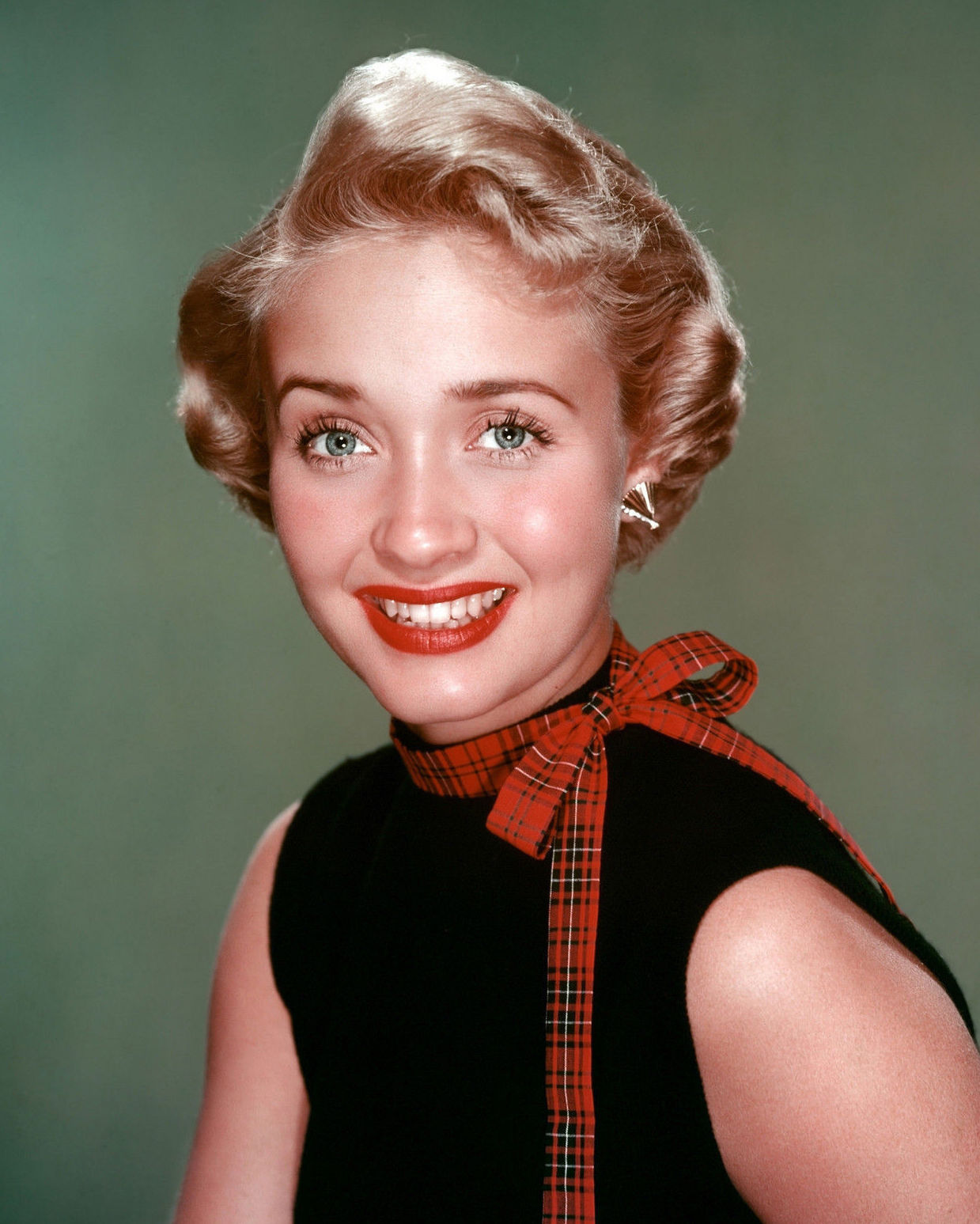
Jane Powell

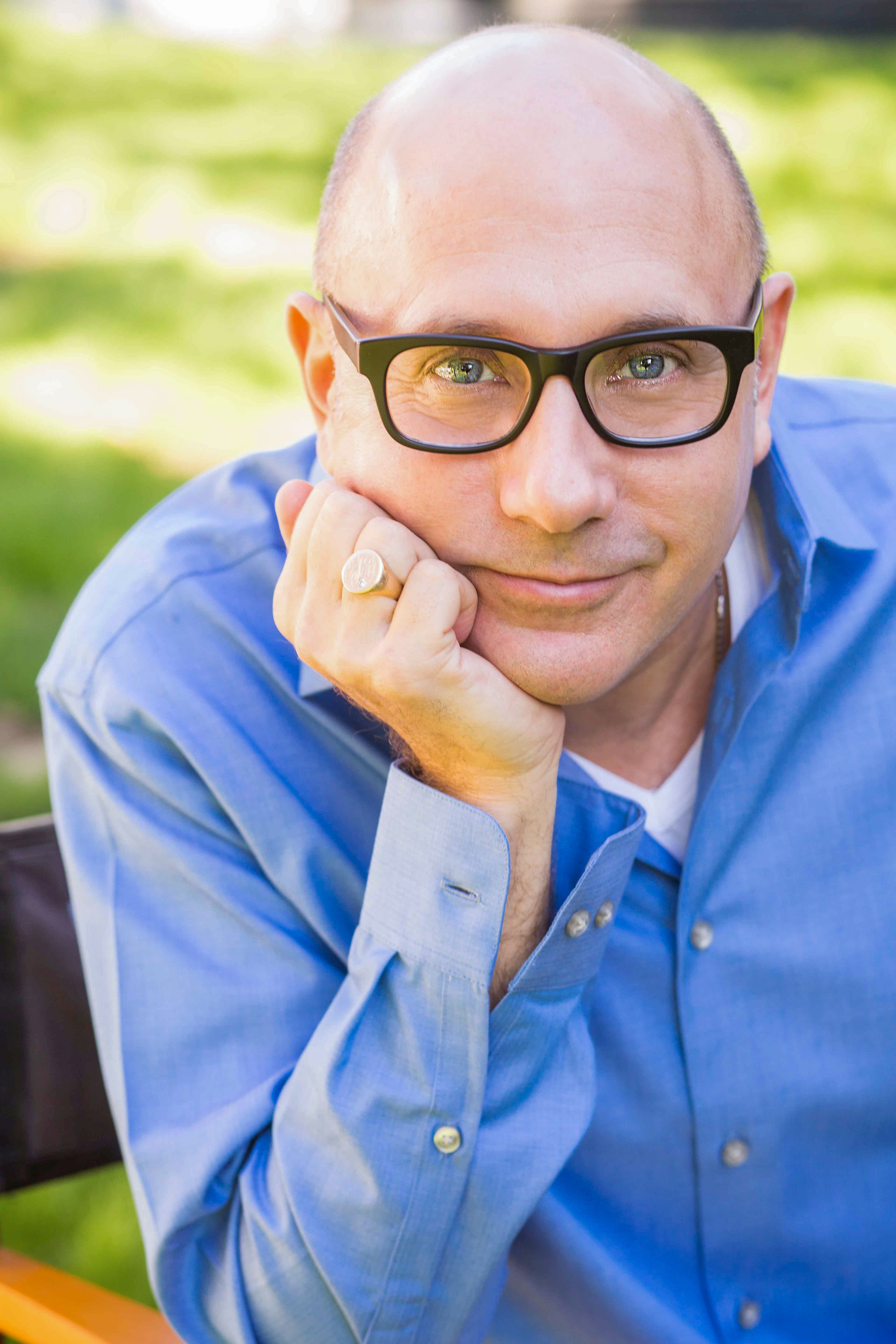
Willie Garson

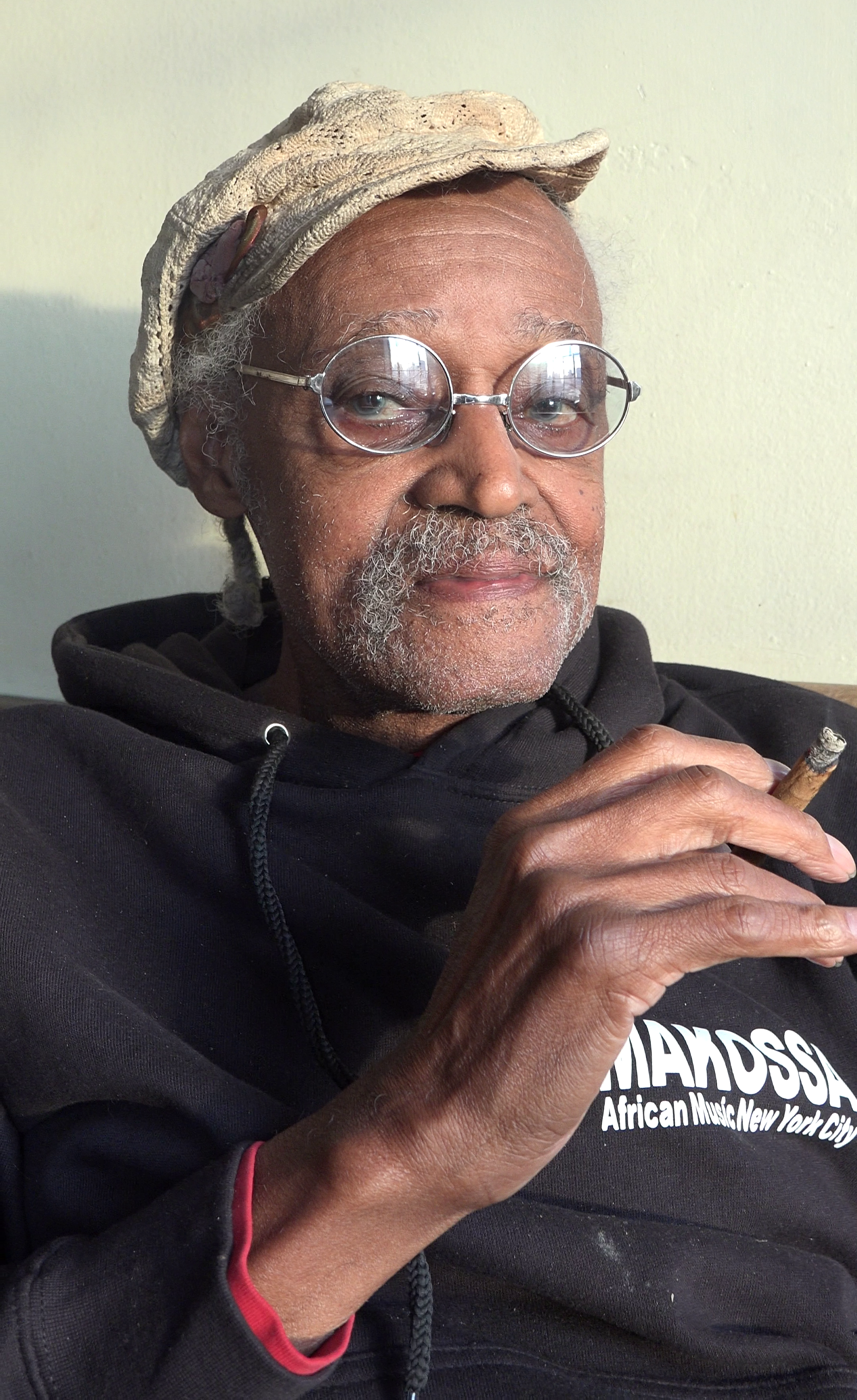
Melvin Van Peebles

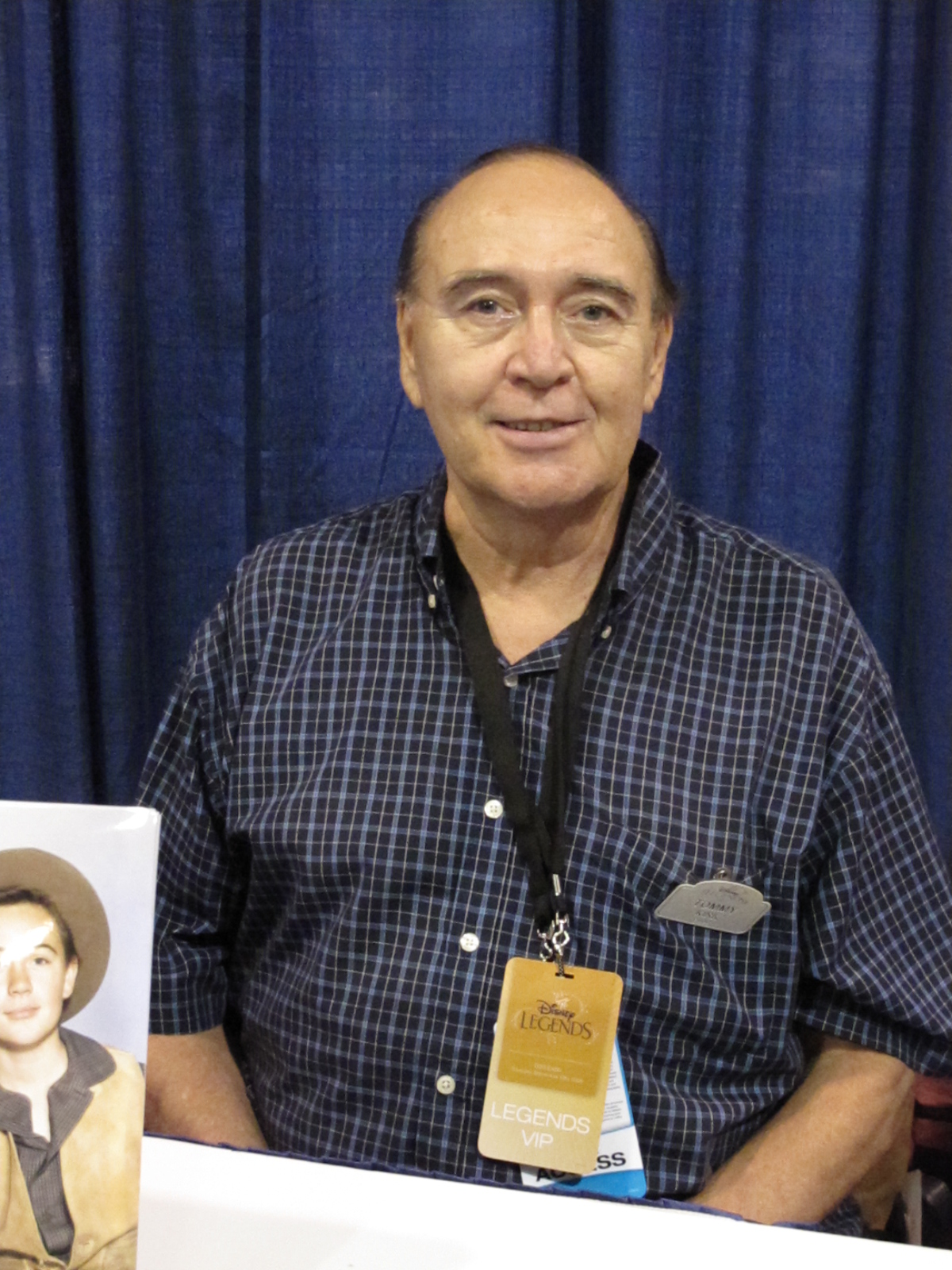
Tommy Kirk

- September 1
  - Daffney, 46, professional wrestler (TNA, WCW) (b. 1975)
  - Carol Fran, 87, soul blues singer, pianist and songwriter (b. 1933)
  - Jim Fuller, 76, football player and coach (Alabama Crimson Tide, Jacksonville State Gamecocks) (b. 1945)
  - Dan Swecker, 74, politician, member of the Washington State Senate (1995–2013) (b. 1947)
- September 2
  - Steve Lawler, 56, professional wrestler and trainer (b. 1965)
  - Keith McCants, 53, football player (Alabama Crimson Tide, Tampa Bay Buccaneers, Houston Oilers) (b. 1968)
  - David Patten, 47, football player (New York Giants, New England Patriots, Washington Redskins) (b. 1974)
- September 3
  - Philip Jamison, 96, watercolorist (b. 1925)
  - Yolanda Lopez, 78, painter, printmaker, and film producer (b. 1942)
- September 4
  - Dell Furano, 70, music industry executive and entrepreneur (b. 1951)
  - Tunch Ilkin, 63, Turkish-born American football player (Pittsburgh Steelers) and broadcaster (b. 1957)
  - Willard Scott, 87, weatherman (Today) (b. 1934)
  - Alberto Vilar, 80, investment manager, arts patron and convicted fraudster (b. 1940)
- September 5
  - Carmen Balthrop, 73, operatic soprano (b. 1948)
  - Eugene N. Borza, 86, historian and academic (b. 1935)
  - Robert P. Hollenbeck, 89, politician, member of the New Jersey General Assembly (1974–1986) (b. 1931)
  - Jonathan Mirsky, 88, journalist and historian (b. 1932)
- September 6
  - Dick Parfitt, 90, college basketball coach (Central Michigan Chippewas) (b. 1931)
  - Frank Russell, 72, basketball player (Detroit Titans, Chicago Bulls) (b. 1949)
  - Todd Scully, 72, Olympian (b. 1948)
  - Adlai Stevenson III, 90, politician, U.S. senator (1970–1981), Illinois Treasurer (1967–1970) and member of the House of Representatives (1965–1967) (b. 1930)
  - Michael K. Williams, 54, actor (The Wire, Boardwalk Empire, The Gambler) (b. 1966)
- September 7
  - Rick Arrington, 74, football player (Philadelphia Eagles) (b. 1947)
  - Carl Bean, 77, Protestant church leader, singer ("I Was Born This Way") and LGBT rights activist (b. 1944)
  - Terry Brennan, 93, college football player and coach (Notre Dame) (b. 1928)
  - Elizabeth A. Clark, 82, professor (b. 1938)
  - Sam Cunningham, 71, football player (New England Patriots) (b. 1950)
  - Phil Schaap, 70, disc jockey and jazz historian (b. 1951)
  - Warren Storm, 84, swamp pop drummer and vocalist (b. 1937)
  - Bill White, 76, professional wrestler (WWWF, GCW, JCP) (b. 1945)
- September 8
  - Derek Bailey, 48, tribal leader and convicted sex offender, chairman of the Grand Traverse Band of Ottawa and Chippewa Indians (2008–2012) (b. 1972)
  - Big Daddy Graham, 68, radio presenter (WIP-FM) and comedian (b. 1953)
  - Betty Karnette, 89, politician, member of the California State Assembly (1992–1994, 2004–2008) and Senate (1996–2004) (b. 1931)
  - Art Metrano, 84, actor and comedian (b. 1936)
  - Robert A. Rovner, 77, politician and lawyer, member of the Pennsylvania State Senate (1971–1974) (b. 1943)
- September 9
  - Marianne Battani, 77, federal judge, Eastern District of Michigan (since 2000) (b. 1944)
  - Harold Franklin, 88, history professor; first African American student at Auburn University (b. 1932)
  - Gene Littles, 78, basketball player (Carolina Cougars) and coach (Cleveland Cavaliers, Charlotte Hornets) (b. 1943)
  - Richard McGeagh, 77, water polo player and Olympic swimmer (1964) (b. 1944)
- September 10 – Stephen H. Grimes, 93, judge, justice for the Supreme Court of Florida (1987–1996) (b. 1927)
- September 11
  - Tommy Hazouri, 76, politician, mayor of Jacksonville (1987–1991) and member of the Florida House of Representatives (1974–1986) (b. 1944)
  - Mick Tingelhoff, 81, Hall of Fame football player (Minnesota Vikings) (b. 1940)
  - Gloria Warren, 95, actress (b. 1926)(Dangerous Money, Cinderella Swings It, Bells of San Fernando) and singer.
- September 12
  - Fran Bennett, 84, actress (Nightingales, Sunset Beach, New Nightmare) (b. 1937)
  - Ben Best, 46, screenwriter (Eastbound & Down) and actor (Superbad, Land of the Lost) (b. 1974)
  - Wendell Wise Mayes Jr., 97, radio and cable television executive (b. 1924)
  - James Snyder Jr., 76, author, attorney and politician, member of the North Carolina House of Representatives (1969–1973) (b. 1945)
  - John Shelby Spong, 90, Episcopal prelate, bishop of Newark (1979–2000) (b. 1931)
  - Bruce Spraggins, 82, basketball player (Philadelphia Tapers, New Jersey Americans) (b. 1939)
- September 13
  - Mike Boyle, 77, politician, mayor of Omaha, Nebraska (1981–1987) (b. 1944)
  - Ruly Carpenter, 81, baseball executive, president of the Philadelphia Phillies (1972–1981) (b. 1940)
  - Don Collier, 92, actor (Bonanza, Gunsmoke, The High Chaparral) (b. 1928)
  - Bob Enyart, 62, talk radio host (b. 1959)
  - Parys Haralson, 37, football player (Tennessee Volunteers, San Francisco 49ers, New Orleans Saints) (b. 1984)
  - George Wein, 95, festival promoter and jazz pianist, founder of the Newport Jazz Festival, Newport Folk Festival, and New Orleans Jazz & Heritage Festival (b. 1925)
  - Earl P. Yates, 97, Navy rear admiral (b. 1923)
- September 14
  - George Ferencz, 74, theatre director (b. 1947)
  - Dave Jenks, 79, author and real estate mogul (b. 1942)
  - Reuben Klamer, 99, board game inventor (The Game of Life) (b. 1922)
  - Norm Macdonald, 61, Canadian comedian (Saturday Night Live) (b. 1959)
- September 15
  - Norman Bailey, 88, British-born American opera singer (b. 1933)
  - Carl DePasqua, 93, college football player (Pittsburgh Panthers) and coach (Waynesburg) (b. 1927)
  - Leta Powell Drake, 83, broadcaster and television executive (KOLN-TV) (b. 1938)
  - Leonard Gibbs, 73, percussionist (b. 1948)
  - Penny Harrington, 79, police officer (b. 1942)
  - Satoshi Hirayama, 91, baseball player (Hiroshima Carp) (b. 1930)
  - W. Tayloe Murphy Jr., 88, politician, member of the Virginia House of Delegates (1982–2000) and Virginia secretary of natural resources (2002–2006) (b. 1933)
  - Joel Rapp, 87, film director and television writer (High School Big Shot, McHale's Navy, Gilligan's Island) (b. 1934)
  - Bill Sudakis, 75, baseball player (Los Angeles Dodgers, Texas Rangers, New York Yankees) (b. 1946)
- September 16
  - George Mraz, 77, Czech-born American jazz musician (b. 1944)
  - Jane Powell, 92, actress (A Date with Judy, Seven Brides for Seven Brothers, Royal Wedding), singer and dancer (b. 1929)
  - Steve Riley, 68, football player (Minnesota Vikings) (b. 1952)
  - John Ruggie, 76, political scientist (b. 1944)
  - Ruth C. Sullivan, 97, autism advocate (b. 1924)
- September 17
  - Roger Brown, 84, Hall of Fame football player (Maryland State, Detroit Lions, Los Angeles Rams) (b. 1937)
  - Russ Dallen, 58, economist (b. 1963) (death announced on this date)
  - Tim Donnelly, 77, actor (Emergency!, The Secret of Santa Vittoria, The Toolbox Murders) (b. 1944
  - Basil Hoffman, 83, actor (The Artist, Hill Street Blues, Santa Barbara) (b. 1938)
- September 18
  - Neil McCarthy, 81, college basketball player (Sacramento State Hornets) and coach (Weber State Wildcats, New Mexico State Aggies) (b. 1940)
  - Mick McGinty, artist (Street Fighter II)
  - Albert J. Raboteau, 78, religion scholar, dean of Princeton University Graduate School (1992–1993) (b. 1943)
- September 19
  - James Bilbray, 83, politician and postal executive, member of the U.S. House of Representatives (1987–1995) and chairman of the Board of Governors of the USPS (2014–2016) (b. 1938)
  - Richard Buckley, 72, journalist and writer (b. 1948–1949)
  - Steve Davisson, 63, politician, member of the Indiana House of Representatives (since 2010) (b. 1957–1958)
  - Richard Lachmann, 65, sociologist (b. 1956)
  - Gabby Petito, 22, vandweller (b. 1999) (body discovered on this date)
  - Ronald F. Probstein, 93, engineer (b. 1928)
- September 20
  - Colin Bailey, 87, English-born American jazz drummer (b. 1934)
  - Sherwood Boehlert, 84, politician, member of the U.S. House of Representatives (1983–2007) and chair of the House Science Committee (2001–2007) (b. 1937)
  - Cloyd Boyer, 94, baseball player (St. Louis Cardinals) (b. 1927
  - Sarah Dash, 76, singer (Labelle) (b. 1945)
  - Jim Van Engelenhoven, 78, politician, member of the Iowa House of Representatives (1999–2012) (b. 1943)
  - Chauncey Howell, 86, journalist (Women's Wear Daily, The New York Times, WNBC) (b. 1935)
  - Billy Maxwell, 92, golfer (b. 1929)
- September 21
  - Angelo Codevilla, 78, Italian-born American professor emeritus of international relations (b. 1943)
  - Marcia Freedman, 83, American-Israeli activist, MK (1974–1977) (b. 1938)
  - Willie Garson, 57, actor (Sex and the City, White Collar, John from Cincinnati) (b. 1964)
  - Marilyn Golden, 67, disability advocate (b. 1954)
  - Al Harrington, 85, Samoan-American actor (Hawaii Five-O) (b. 1935)
  - Joan Howard Maurer, 94, author and actress
  - John Brendan McCormack, 86, Roman Catholic prelate, bishop of Manchester (1998–2011) (b. 1935)
  - Jack Minore, 82, politician, member of the Michigan House of Representatives (1999–2004) (b. 1938)
  - Peter Palmer, 90, actor (Li'l Abner, Custer) (b. 1931)
  - Melvin Van Peebles, 89, film director, actor and playwright (Sweet Sweetback's Baadasssss Song, Posse, Ain't Supposed to Die a Natural Death) (b. 1932)
  - Anthony Pilla, 88, Roman Catholic prelate, auxiliary bishop (1979–1980) and bishop (1980–2006) of Cleveland (b. 1932)
  - Frank Pratt, 79, politician, member of the Arizona Senate (2017–2021) and House of Representatives (2009–2017, since 2021) (b. 1942)
- September 22
  - Bob Moore, 88, session bassist and orchestra leader (b. 1932)
  - Floyd Sagely, 89, football player (b. 1932)
  - Jay Sandrich, 89, Hall of Fame television director (The Mary Tyler Moore Show, The Cosby Show, Soap), four-time Emmy winner (b. 1932)
- September 23
  - David H. DePatie, 91, film and television producer (The Pink Phink, The Lorax, Spider-Man and His Amazing Friends) (b. 1929)
  - Andrew Douglas, 89, jurist justice of the Ohio Supreme Court (1985–2002) (b. 1932)
  - Pee Wee Ellis, 80, saxophonist, composer and arranger (b. 1941)
  - Bruce Fleisher, 72, golfer (b. 1948)
  - Natalie Meyer, 91, politician, Secretary of State of Colorado (1983–1995) (b. 1930)
  - Charles Grier Sellers, 98, historian (b. 1923)
  - John August Swanson, 83, visual artist (b. 1938)
  - Sue Thompson, 96, pop and country singer ("Sad Movies (Make Me Cry)", "Norman") (b. 1925)
- September 24
  - Cornelia Clark, 71, jurist, justice of the Tennessee Supreme Court (since 2005) (b. 1950)
  - Freddie Fu, 70, Hong Kong-American orthopaedic surgeon (b. 1950–1951)
  - Diana Natalicio, 82, academic administrator, president of the University of Texas at El Paso (1988–2019) (b. 1939)
  - Raymundo Joseph Peña, 87, Roman Catholic prelate, bishop of El Paso (1980–1995) and Brownsville (1995–2009) (b. 1934)
- September 25 – Walter Scott Jr., 90, civil engineer, CEO of Kiewit Corporation (1979–1998) (b. 1931)
- September 26
  - Frances Farenthold, 94, politician, member of the Texas House of Representatives (1969–1973) (b. 1926)
  - George Frayne IV, 77, singer and keyboardist (Commander Cody and His Lost Planet Airmen) (b. 1944)
  - Bobby Zarem, 84, publicist (b. 1936)
- September 27
  - Andrea Martin, 49, singer-songwriter ("I Love Me Some Him", "Before You Walk Out of My Life", "Don't Let Go"), and producer (b. 1972)
  - James L. Mathewson, 83, politician, member of the Missouri House of Representatives (1974–1980) and Senate (1980–2006) (b. 1938)
- September 28
  - Karan Armstrong, 79, operatic soprano (b. 1941)
  - Will Bagley, 71, historian and writer (Blood of the Prophets) (b. 1950)
  - James Buswell, 74, violinist (b. 1946)
  - Edward Helfrick, 93, politician, member of the Pennsylvania House of Representatives (1977–1980), and Senate (1981–2003) (b. 1928)
  - Tommy Kirk, 79, actor (Old Yeller, The Shaggy Dog, The Misadventures of Merlin Jones) (b. 1941)
  - Phi Nhung, 49, Vietnamese-American singer and actress (b. 1972)
  - Lonnie Smith, 79, jazz musician (b. 1942)
  - Ray Snell, 63, football player (Tampa Bay Buccaneers, Pittsburgh Steelers, Detroit Lions) (b. 1958)
  - Moshe David Tendler, 95, rabbi and biologist (b. 1926)
- September 29
  - Ravil Isyanov, 59, Russian-born American actor (GoldenEye, K-19: The Widowmaker, Transformers: Dark of the Moon) (b. 1962)
  - Lee Quarnstrom, 81, journalist (b. 1939–1940)
  - Mike Renzi, 75, composer and music director (Sesame Street) (b. 1946)
  - Michael Tylo, 73, actor (The Young and the Restless, Zorro, Guiding Light) (b. 1948)
- September 30
  - Carlisle Floyd, 95, opera composer (b. 1926)
  - John Rigas, 96, businessman and convicted fraudster, co-founder of the Adelphia Communications Corporation (b. 1924)

== October ==
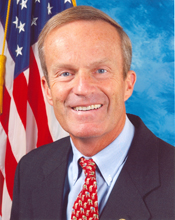
Todd Akin

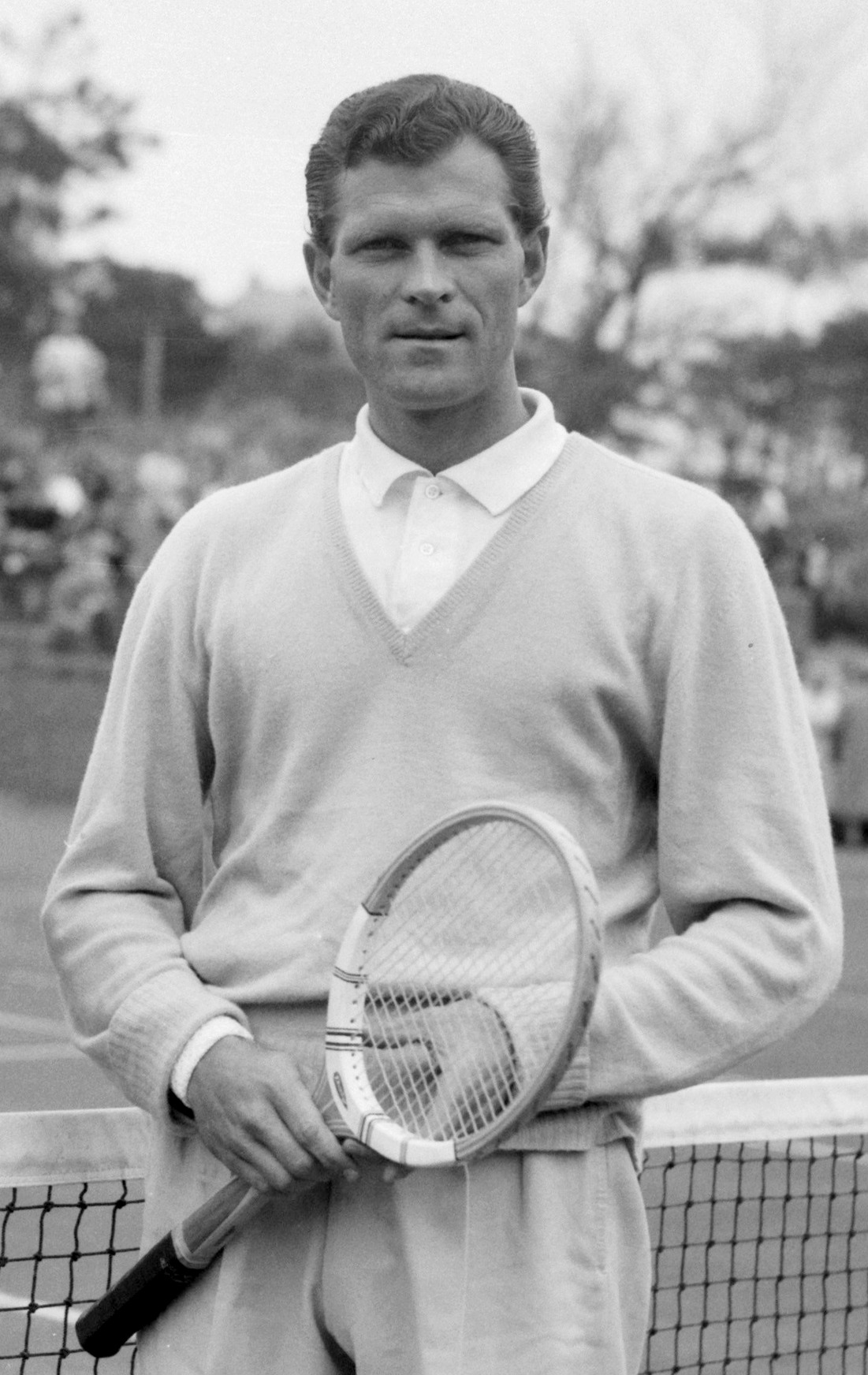
Budge Patty

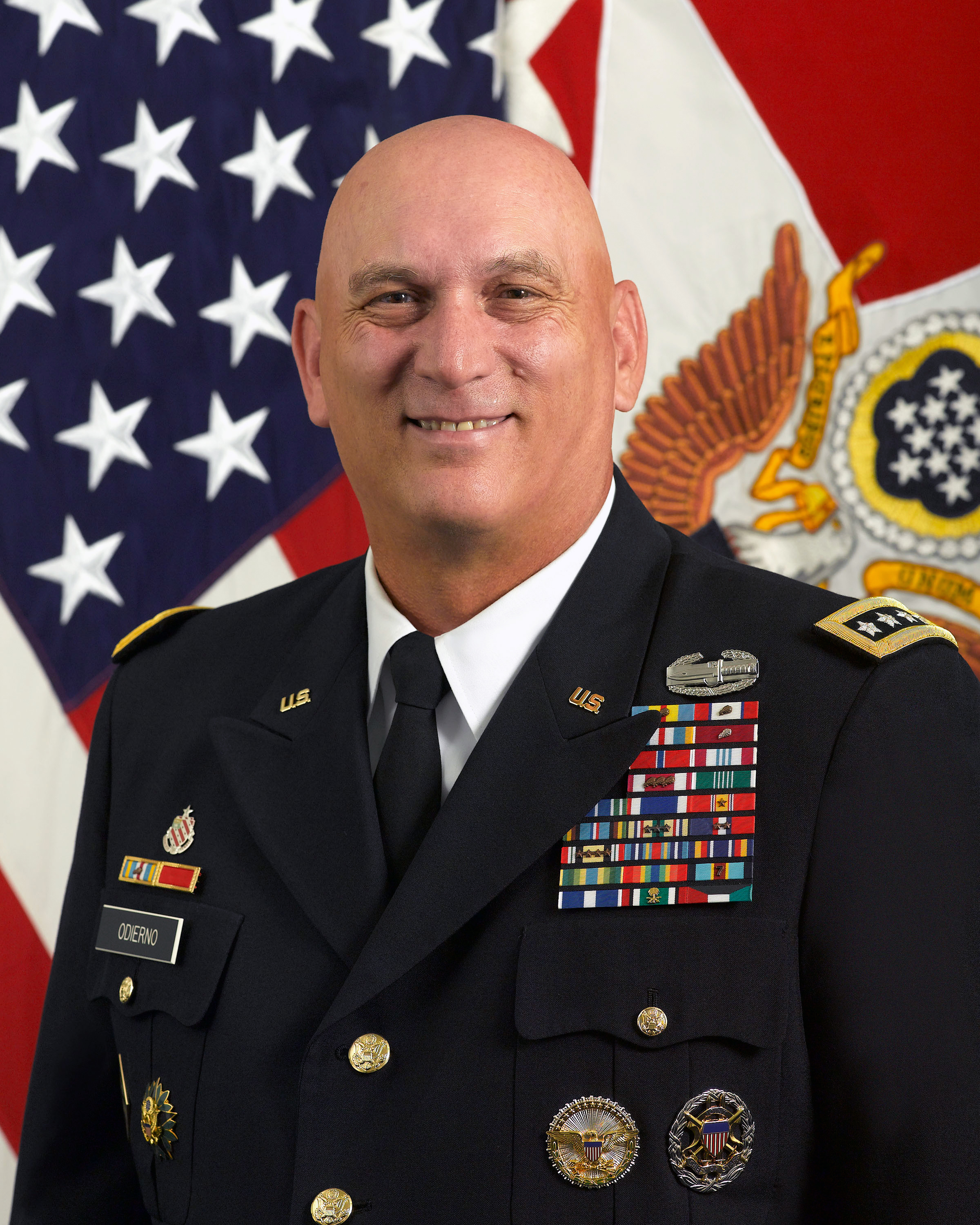
Raymond T. Odierno

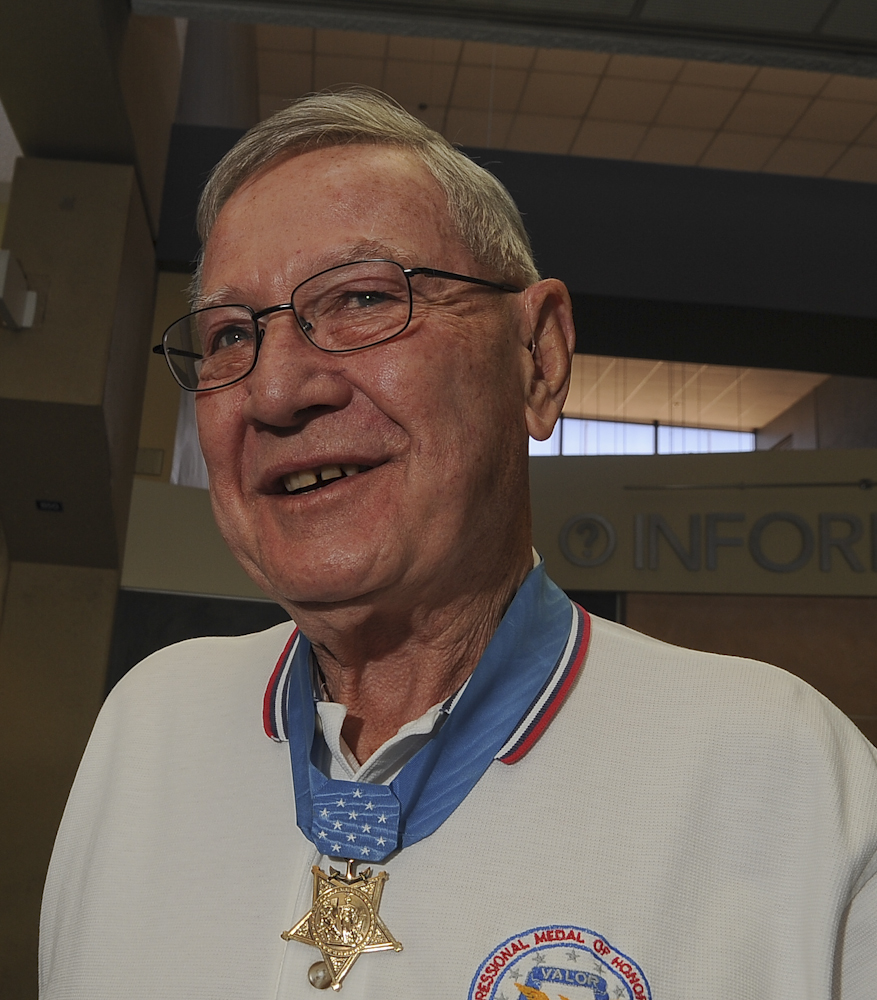
Duane E. Dewey

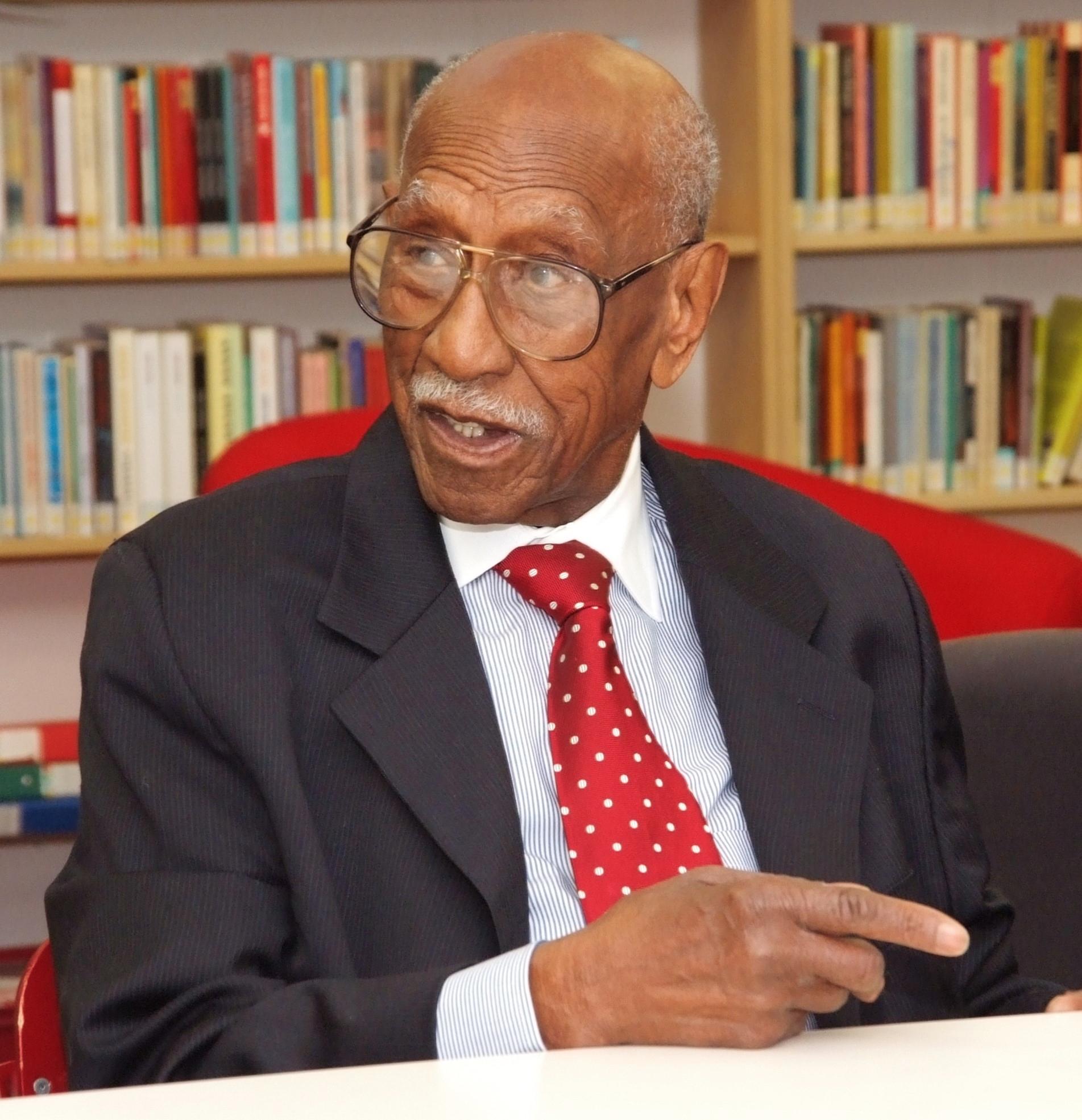
Timuel Black

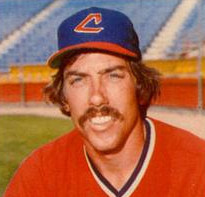
Ray Fosse

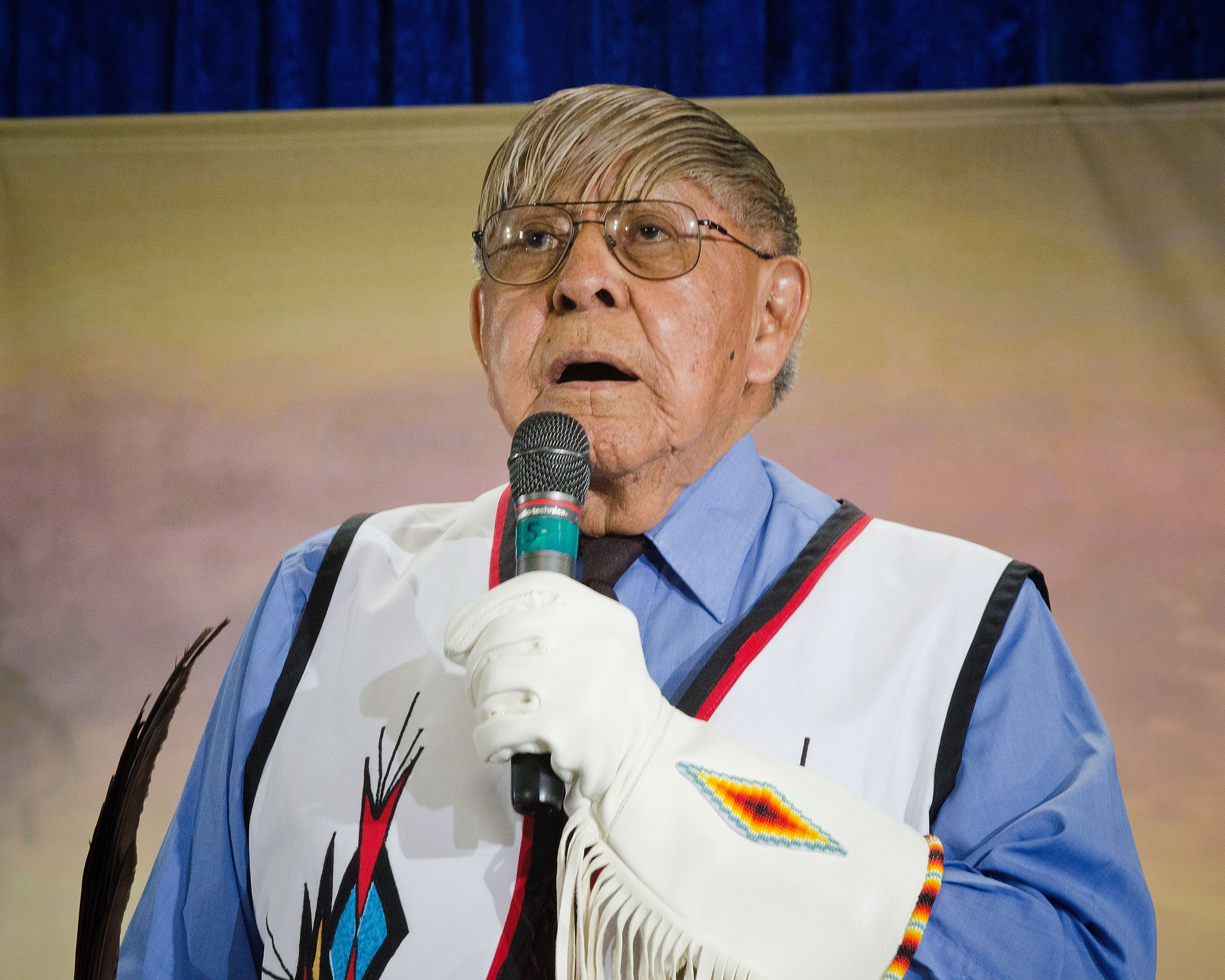
Earl Old Person

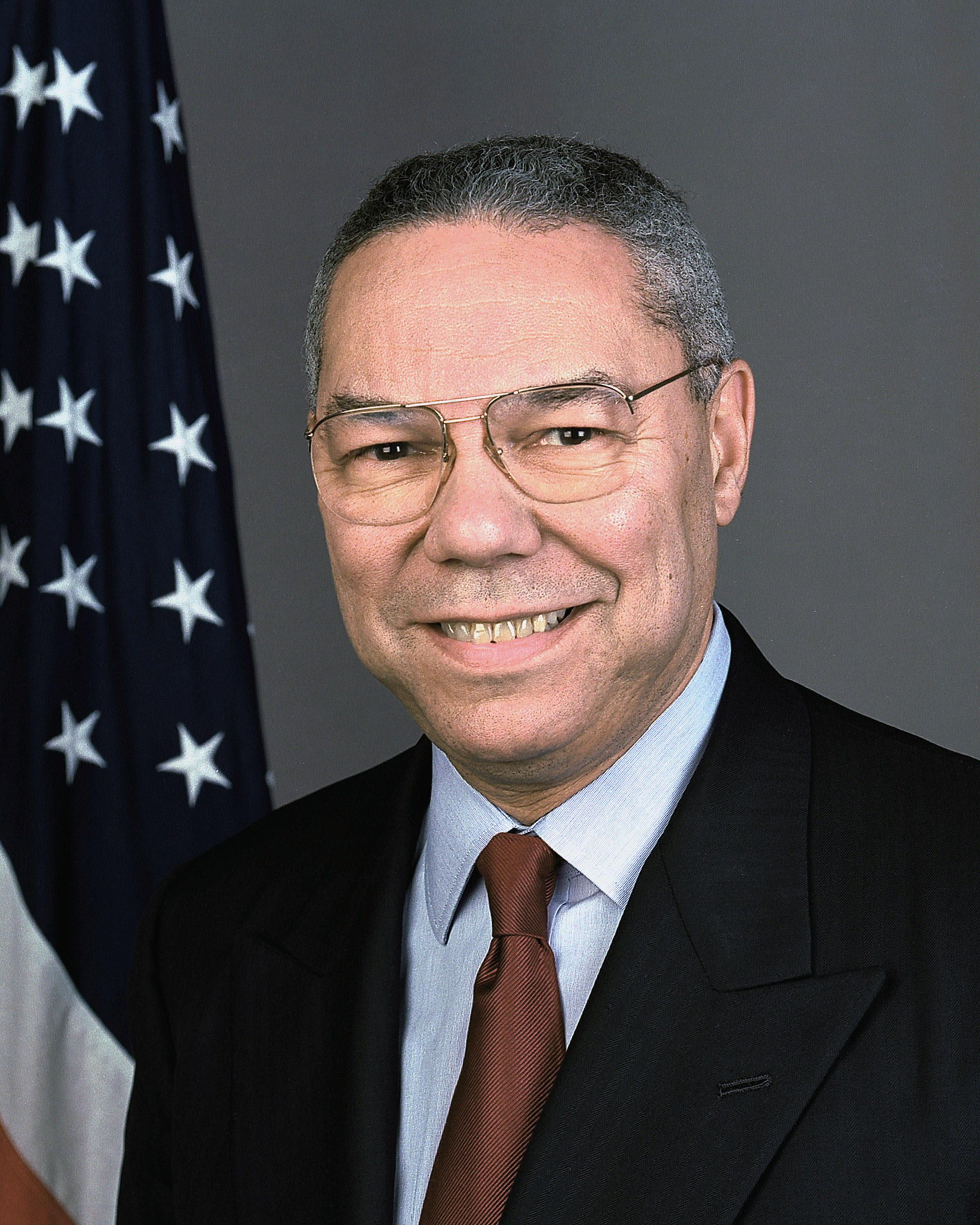
Colin Powell

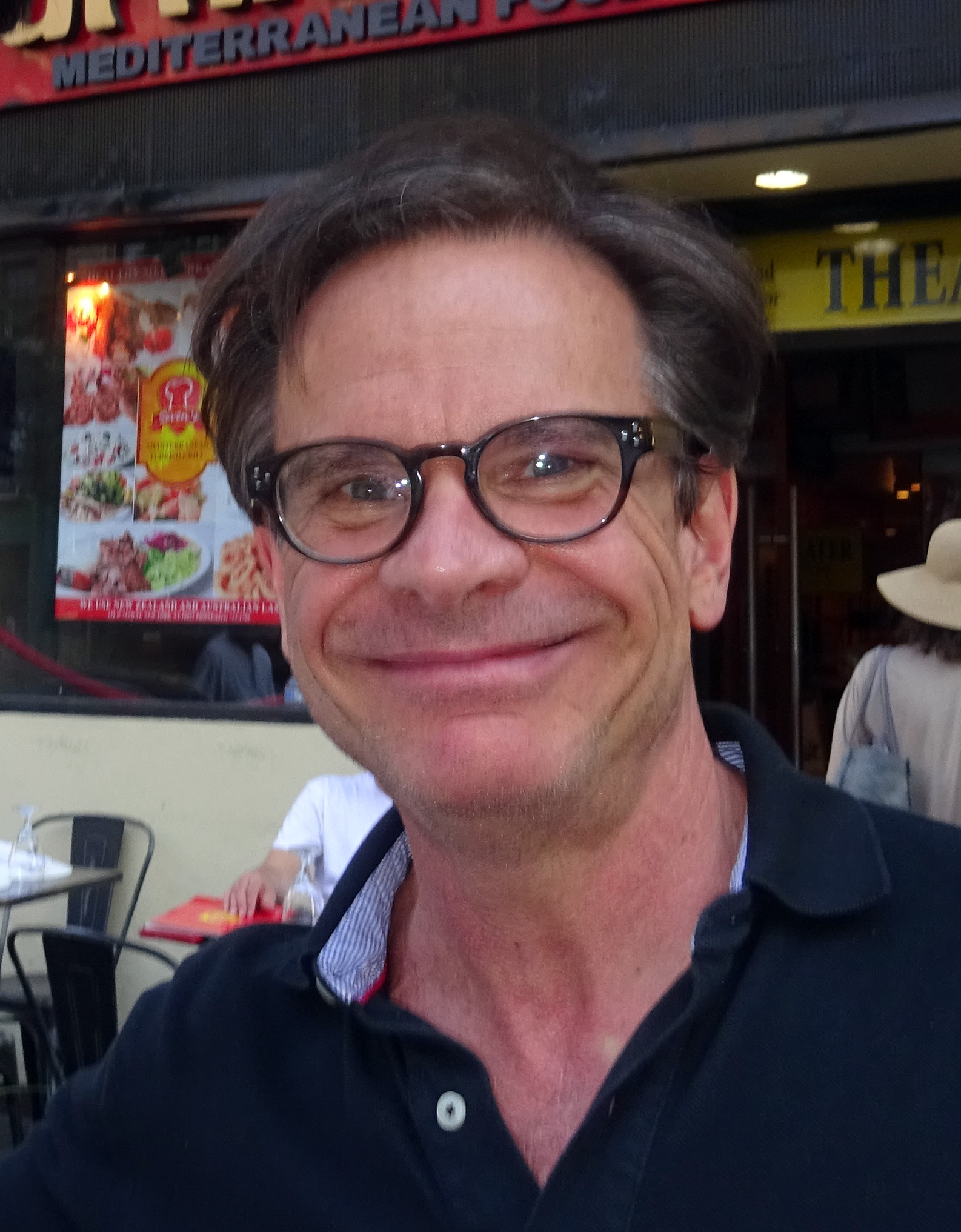
Peter Scolari

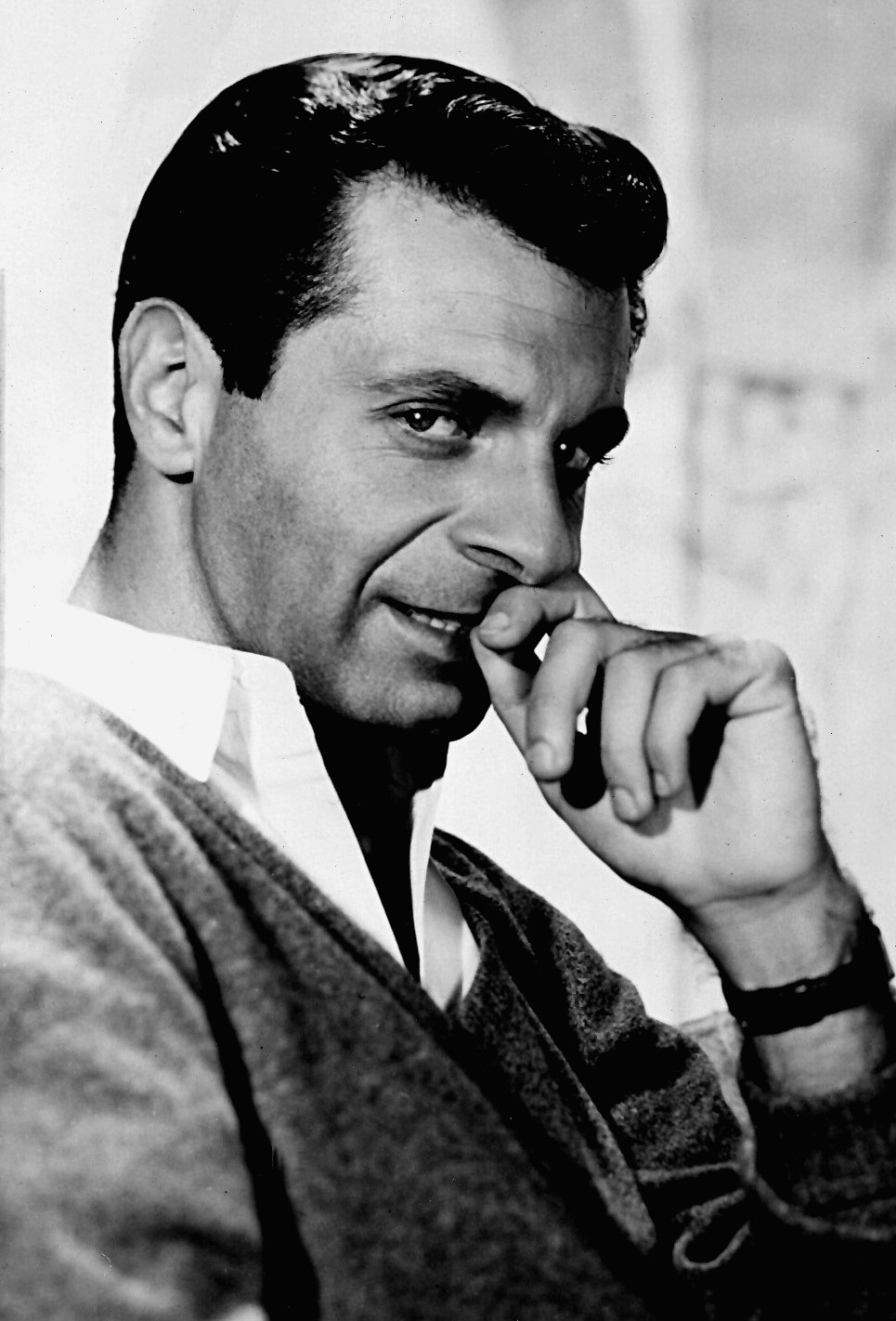
Mort Sahl

- October 1
  - Buddy Alliston, 87, football player (Winnipeg Blue Bombers, Denver Broncos) (b. 1933)
  - Raymond Gniewek, 89, violinist (b. 1931)
  - Lissy Jarvik, 97, Dutch-born American psychiatrist (b. 1924)
  - Frank Locascio, 89, mobster (Gambino crime family) (b. 1932)
  - Andrea Schroeder, 57, politician, member of the Michigan House of Representatives (since 2019) (b. 1964)
- October 2
  - Jack Biondolillo, 81, bowler, (b. 1940)
  - Dana Bumgardner, 67, politician, member of the North Carolina House of Representatives (since 2013) (b. 1954)
  - Anthony Downs, 90, economist and politologist (An Economic Theory of Democracy) (b. 1930)
  - Richard Evans, 86, actor (Peyton Place, Islands in the Stream, Dirty Little Billy) (b. 1935)
  - Chuck Hartenstein, 79, baseball player (Chicago Cubs, Pittsburgh Pirates, St. Louis Cardinals) (b. 1942)
  - Jim Hess, 84, high school and college football coach (Angelo State Rams, Stephen F. Austin Lumberjacks, New Mexico State Aggies) (b. 1936)
  - Mortimer Mishkin, 94, neuropsychologist (b. 1926)
  - Bill Russo, 74, college football coach (Lafayette Leopards, Wagner Seahawks) (b. 1947)
  - John Wes Townley, 31, racing driver (NASCAR Camping World Truck Series) (b. 1989)
  - Sidney Walton, 102, World War II veteran (b. 1919)
  - Major Wingate, 37, basketball player (Springfield Armor, Shanxi Zhongyu, Tofas Bursa) (b. 1983)
- October 3
  - Todd Akin, 74, politician, member of the Missouri (1989–2001) and U.S. House of Representatives (2001–2013) (b. 1947)
  - Lee Brozgol, 80, artist (b. 1941)
  - Cynthia Harris, 87, actress (Mad About You, Up the Sandbox, Three Men and a Baby) (b. 1934)
  - Irwin Marcus, 102, psychiatrist (b. 1919)
  - Neal Sher, 74, lawyer (b. 1947)
- October 4
  - Mike Connelly, 85, football player (Dallas Cowboys) (b. 1935)
  - Alan Kalter, 78, television announcer (Late Show with David Letterman) (b. 1943)
  - Budge Patty, 97, Hall of Fame tennis player (b. 1924)
  - Eddie Robinson, 100, baseball player and general manager (Cleveland Indians, New York Yankees, Texas Rangers) (b. 1920)
  - Sebastian Shaw, 53, Vietnamese-born American serial killer (b. 1967)
- October 5
  - Hobo Jim, 68, folk singer-songwriter (b. 1952–1953)
  - Ernest Lee Johnson, 61, convicted criminal (b. 1960)
  - Jerry Shipp, 86, basketball player, Olympic champion (1964) (b. 1935)
- October 6
  - Lou Antonelli, 64, author (b. 1957)
  - Patricia McMahon Hawkins, 72, diplomat, ambassador to Togo (2008–2011) (b. 1948–1949)
  - Patrick Horgan, 92, British-born American actor (Ryan's Hope, The Doctors) (b. 1929) (death announced on this date)
  - Martin J. Sherwin, 84, historian and biographer (American Prometheus), Pulitzer Prize winner (2006) (b. 1937)
  - Sheldon Stone, 75, particle physicist (b. 1946)
  - Ted Venetoulis, 87, politician (b. 1934)
- October 7
  - Myriam Sarachik, 88, experimental physicist (b. 1933)
  - Jan Shutan, 88, actress (Room 222, Ben Casey) (b. 1932)
  - Ralph Spinella, 98, Olympic fencer (1960) (b. 1923)
- October 8
  - Pauline Bart, 91, sociologist (b. 1930)
  - Yisrayl Hawkins, 87, cult leader (House of Yahweh) (b. 1933–1934)
  - Raymond T. Odierno, 67, military officer, chief of staff of the Army (2011–2015) (b. 1954)
  - Richard Ohmann, 90, literary critic (b. 1931)
  - Jorge Antonio Solis, 70, federal judge, Northern District of Texas (1991–2016) (b. 1951)
  - Jem Targal, 74, bass guitarist and singer-songwriter (b. 1946–1947)
- October 9
  - Rich Barry, 81, baseball player (Philadelphia Phillies) (b. 1940)
  - Jean Ledwith King, 97, attorney, teacher and political activist (b. 1924)
  - Shawn McLemore, 54, gospel singer (b. 1967)
  - Dee Pop, 65, drummer (Bush Tetras, The Gun Club) (b. 1956)
  - Anne Saxelby, 40, cheesemonger (b. 1981)
- October 10
  - Granville Adams, 58, actor (Oz, Homicide: Life on the Street, Empire) (b. 1962–1963)
  - Ken Casanega, 100, football player (San Francisco 49ers) (b. 1921)
  - Jim Coley, 70, politician, member of the Tennessee House of Representatives (2007–2020) (b. 1951)
  - Bob Herron, 97, stuntman (Spartacus, Diamonds Are Forever, Rocky) and actor (b. 1924)
  - David Kennedy, 82, advertising executive, co-founder of Wieden+Kennedy (b. 1938–1939)
  - Joyce Lebra, 95, historian (b. 1925)
  - Peter O'Donnell, 97, businessman, investor, and philanthropist (b. 1924)
  - Megan Rice, 91, nun and nuclear disarmament activist (b. 1930)
  - Ruthie Tompson, 111, animator (Pinocchio, Fantasia, Dumbo) (b. 1910)
- October 11
  - Tony DeMarco, 89, Hall of Fame boxer, world welterweight champion 1955 (b. 1932)
  - Duane E. Dewey, 89, soldier, Medal of Honor recipient (b. 1931)
  - Deon Estus, 65, singer and bassist (Wham!, George Michael) (b. 1956)
  - Jack J. Grynberg, 89, Polish-born American oil and gas developer (b. 1932)
  - Bill Hudson, 88, politician, member of the Alaska House of Representatives (1987–1995, 1997–2003) (b. 1932)
  - Robert Introne, 79, politician, member of the New Hampshire House of Representatives (2000–2016) (b. 1942)
  - Ray Sullivan, 44, politician, member of the Rhode Island House of Representatives (2005–2011) (b. 1977)
  - Herbert L. Wilkerson, 101, military officer, commanding general of Camp Lejeune (1972–1973) (b. 1919)
- October 12
  - Leon Black, 89, college basketball coach (Texas Longhorns) (b. 1931–1932)
  - Warren Bryant, 65, football player (Atlanta Falcons, Los Angeles Raiders) (b. 1955)
  - Ricarlo Flanagan, 41, comedian and actor (Shameless, Walk the Prank) (b. 1980)
  - Brian Goldner, 58, business executive and film producer (Transformers, G.I. Joe), CEO of Hasbro (2008–2021) (b. 1963)
  - Julie L. Green, 60, visual artist (b. 1961)
  - Roy Horan, 71, actor (Game of Death II, Snake in the Eagle's Shadow) and martial artist (b. 1950)
  - Marcus Malone, 77, percussionist (Santana) and composer ("Soul Sacrifice") (b. 1944)
  - Bruce Spraggins, 82, basketball player (Virginia Union Panthers, New Jersey Americans) (b. 1939)
  - Kariamu Welsh, 72, choreographer (b. 1949)
- October 13
  - Otis Armstrong, 70, Hall of Fame football player (Purdue Boilermakers, Denver Broncos) (b. 1950)
  - Timuel Black, 102, historian and civil rights activist (b. 1918)
  - Ray Fosse, 74, baseball player (Cleveland Indians, Oakland Athletics, Seattle Mariners, Milwaukee Brewers) and broadcaster, World Series champion (1973, 1974) (b. 1947)
  - Bill Hager, 74, politician (b. 1947)
  - Dale Kildee, 92, politician, member of the U.S. House of Representatives (1977–2013), Michigan Senate (1975–1976) and House of Representatives (1965–1974) (b. 1929)
  - Earl Old Person, 92, Blackfeet tribal leader (b. 1929)
  - Gary Paulsen, 82, novelist (Hatchet, Dogsong, The River) (b. 1939)
  - Clem Tillion, 96, politician, member of the Alaska House of Representatives (1963–1975) and Senate (1975–1981), Senate president (1979–1981) (b. 1925)
- October 14
  - Emani 22, 22, R&B singer (b. 1989)
  - Phil Leadbetter, 59, musician, resonator guitar player (b. 1962)
  - Tom Morey, 86, musician, engineer and surfboard shaper (b. 1935)
  - Diane Weyermann, 66, film producer (Collective, An Inconvenient Truth, RBG) (b. 1954–1955)
- October 15
  - Tuineau Alipate, 54, Tongan-born American football player (Minnesota Vikings, Saskatchewan Roughriders, New York Jets) (b. 1967)
  - Dan Benishek, 69, politician, member of the U.S. House of Representatives (2011–2017) (b. 1952)
  - Joanna Cameron, 70, actress (The Secrets of Isis, I Love My Wife, Pretty Maids All in a Row) (b. 1951)
  - Larry Koon, 77, politician, member of the South Carolina House of Representatives (1975–2005) (b. 1944)
  - Dorothy Steel, 95, actress (Black Panther, Poms, Jumanji: The Next Level) (b. 1926)
  - Don Stonesifer, 94, football player (Chicago Cardinals) (b. 1927)
  - Dave Washington, 73, football player (Denver Broncos, Buffalo Bills, San Francisco 49ers) (b. 1948)
- October 16
  - Wes Cooley, 65, motorcycle road racer (b. 1956
  - Dennis Franks, 68, football player (Philadelphia Eagles) (b. 1953)
  - Frank Hargrove, 94, politician, member of the Virginia House of Delegates (1982–2010) (b. 1927)
  - Betty Lynn, 95, actress (The Andy Griffith Show, Cheaper by the Dozen, Meet Me in Las Vegas) (b. 1926)
  - Paul Salata, 94, football player (San Francisco 49ers) and actor (Angels in the Outfield, The Kid from Left Field) (b. 1926)
  - Pat Studstill, 83, football player (Detroit Lions, Los Angeles Rams, New England Patriots) (b. 1938)
  - Ron Tutt, 83, drummer (Elvis Presley) (b. 1938)
- October 17
  - Chuck Bundrant, 79, businessman, co-founder and chairman of Trident Seafoods (b. 1941–1942)
  - Brian Gassaway, 49, mixed martial artist (UFC) (b. 1972)
  - Bruce Gaston, 74, Thai classical musician (b. 1947)
  - David M. Livingston, 80, physician (b. 1941)
  - Mike McCoy, 73, petroleum engineer, businessman, and former minority owner of the Dallas Cowboys (b. 1948)
  - Floyd Salas, 90, novelist and social activist (b. 1931)
- October 18
  - Christopher Ayres, 56, voice actor (Dragon Ball, One Piece, Black Butler) (b. 1965)
  - Val Bisoglio, 95, actor (Saturday Night Fever, The Frisco Kid, Quincy, M.E.) (b. 1926)
  - Ralph Carmichael, 94, composer (The Blob, My Mother the Car) and arranger (b. 1927)
  - Maxine Conder, 95, Navy rear admiral, director, Navy Nurse Corps (1975–1979) (b. 1926)
  - Jo-Carroll Dennison, 97, pageant winner (Miss America 1942) and actress (Winged Victory, The Jolson Story) (b. 1923)
  - David Finn, 100, public relations executive and photographer, co-founder of Ruder Finn (b. 1921)
  - Charlie Kulp, 96, aerobatic pilot (b. 1925)
  - William Lucking, 80, actor (Sons of Anarchy, The Rundown, The Magnificent Seven Ride!) (b. 1941)
  - Pamela McCorduck, 80, English-born American author and journalist (b. 1940)
  - Colin Powell, 84, Army general and politician, U.S. Secretary of State (2001–2005), Chairman of the Joint Chiefs of Staff (1989–1993), National Security Advisor (1986–1987) (b. 1937)
  - Charles Ryan, 94, politician, mayor of Springfield, Massachusetts (1962–1967, 2004–2008) (b. 1927)
  - Bill Zeliff, 85, politician, member of the U.S. House of Representatives (1991–1997) (b. 1936)
- October 19
  - Jack Angel, 90, voice actor (Voltron, The Transformers, A.I. Artificial Intelligence) (b. 1930)
  - Tullis Onstott, 66, geologist (b. 1955)
- October 20
  - Pat Campbell, 61, talk radio host (KFAQ) (b. 1960)
  - Mihaly Csikszentmihalyi, 87, Hungarian-American psychologist (flow state concept) (b. 1934)
  - Tom Hannegan, 51, politician, member of the Missouri House of Representatives (since 2017) (b. 1970)
  - Michael Laughlin, 82, film director (Strange Invaders), producer (Two-Lane Blacktop), and writer (Town & Country) (b. 1938)
  - Brian Laundrie, 23, (former) partner to famous YouTube star Gabby Petitio. Remains found on this date.
  - Jerry Pinkney, 81, illustrator (John Henry, The Talking Eggs: A Folktale from the American South) and children's writer (The Lion & the Mouse) (b. 1939)
- October 21
  - George Butler, 78, British-American filmmaker (Pumping Iron, The Endurance: Shackleton's Legendary Antarctic Expedition, Going Upriver) (b. 1943)
  - Kathy Flores, 66, rugby union player (b. 1955)
  - Martha Henry, 83, American-born Canadian actress (The Wars, Dancing in the Dark, Mustard Bath) (b. 1938)
  - Halyna Hutchins, 42, Ukrainian-born American cinematographer (Archenemy, Darlin', Rust) (b. 1979)
  - Robin McNamara, 74, singer-songwriter ("Lay a Little Lovin' on Me") and musician (b. 1947)
  - Quandra Prettyman, 88, professor of African-American studies and English Literature at Barnard College (b. 1933)
- October 22
  - Jay Black, 82, singer (Jay and the Americans) (b. 1938)
  - Cap Dierks, 89, politician, member of the Nebraska Legislature (1987–2003, 2007–2011) (b. 1932)
  - Valentin Gapontsev, 82, Russian-American businessman, founder of IPG Photonics (b. 1939)
  - Peter Scolari, 66, actor (Newhart, Bosom Buddies, Girls), Emmy winner (2016) (b. 1955)
- October 23
  - Theodore H. Geballe, 101, physicist (b. 1920)
  - Bob Neumeier, 70, sportscaster (WBZ, ESPN, NBC Sports) (b. 1950)
  - Carolyn Pollan, 84, politician (b. 1937)
  - Grant Woods, 67, politician, Arizona attorney general (1991–1999) (b. 1954)
- October 24
  - Gene Freidman, 50, Russian-American taxi executive (b. 1970)
  - Arnold Hano, 99, novelist, biographer and journalist (b. 1922)
  - Sonny Osborne, 83, bluegrass musician (Osborne Brothers) and banjo player (b. 1937)
  - James Michael Tyler, 59, actor (Friends, Motel Blue) (b. 1962)
- October 25
  - Willie Cobbs, 89, blues singer, harmonica player and songwriter ("You Don't Love Me") (b. 1932)
  - Ginny Mancini, 97, big band singer and philanthropist, wife of Henry Mancini (b. 1924)
  - Tim Thompson, 97, baseball player (Brooklyn Dodgers, Kansas City Athletics, Detroit Tigers) (b. 1924)
- October 26
  - Linda Carlson, 76, actress (The Beverly Hillbillies, Murder One, Kaz) (b. 1945)
  - Joe Lee Dunn, 75, college football player and coach (New Mexico Lobos, Ole Miss Rebels) (b. 1946)
  - Walter Herbert, 73, music manager (Steve Miller Band, Roxette, Europe) and musician (b. 1948)
  - Mike Lucci, 81, football player (Cleveland Browns, Detroit Lions), Pro Bowl selection (1971) (b. 1939)
  - Rose Lee Maphis, 98, country music singer (b. 1922)
  - Mort Sahl, 94, Canadian-born American comedian (hungry i) and actor (In Love and War, All the Young Men) (b. 1927)
  - Glen Tuckett, 93, college baseball coach (BYU Cougars) and athletic director (Brigham Young University) (b. 1927)
- October 27
  - William Cook, 57, computer scientist (b. 1963)
  - Bob Ferry, 84, basketball player (Detroit Pistons, St. Louis Hawks) and executive (Washington Bullets) (b. 1937)
  - Tyler Herron, 35, baseball player (St. Louis Cardinals) (b. 1986)
  - Russell Jennings, 66, politician, member of the Kansas House of Representatives (since 2013) (b. 1955)
  - Wakefield Poole, 85, dancer, choreographer and adult filmmaker (Boys in the Sand, Bijou) (b. 1936)
- October 28
  - Linwood Holton, 98, politician, governor of Virginia (1970–1974) (b. 1923)
  - Calvin Jones, 70, football player (Denver Broncos) (b. 1951)
  - Jovita Moore, 54, news anchor (WSB-TV) (b. 1967)
  - Camille Saviola, 71, actress (The Purple Rose of Cairo, Addams Family Values, Star Trek: Deep Space Nine) (b. 1950)
  - Dick Szymanski, 89, football player (Baltimore Colts) (b. 1932)
  - Mike Trivisonno, 74, radio broadcaster (WTAM) (b. 1947)
- October 29
  - Gustave Diamond, 93, federal judge, Western District of Pennsylvania (since 1978) (b. 1928)
  - Fran Frisch, 73, cartoonist (b. 1948)
  - Raoul Middleman, 86, painter (b. 1935)
- October 30
  - Harris Berman, 83, physician, dean of Tufts University School of Medicine (2009–2019) (b. 1938)
  - Jerry Remy, 68, baseball player (California Angels, Boston Red Sox) and broadcaster (NESN) (b. 1953)
  - Justus Rosenberg, 100, Polish-born American educator and Resistance member during World War II (b. 1921)
  - Ron Serafini, 67, ice hockey player (California Golden Seals) (b. 1953)
  - Lafayette Stribling, 87, basketball coach (Mississippi Valley State University, Tougaloo College) (b. 1934)
- October 31
  - Frank Farrar, 92, politician, attorney general (1963–1969) and governor (1969–1971) of South Dakota (b. 1929)
  - Miguel Mena, 34, Peruvian-born American jockey (b. 1986)

== November ==
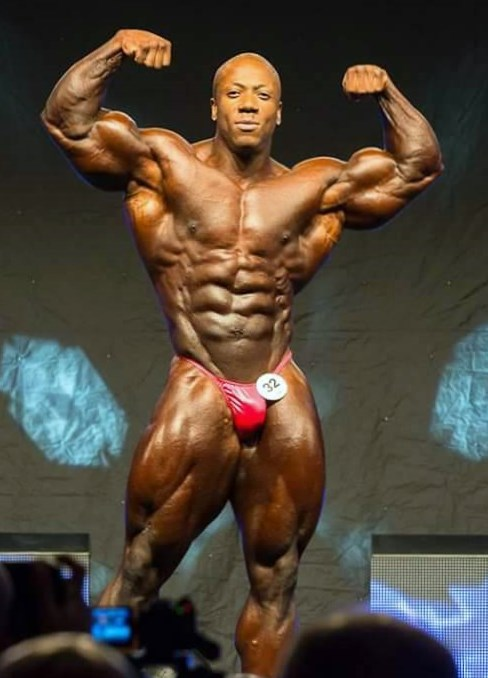
Shawn Rhoden

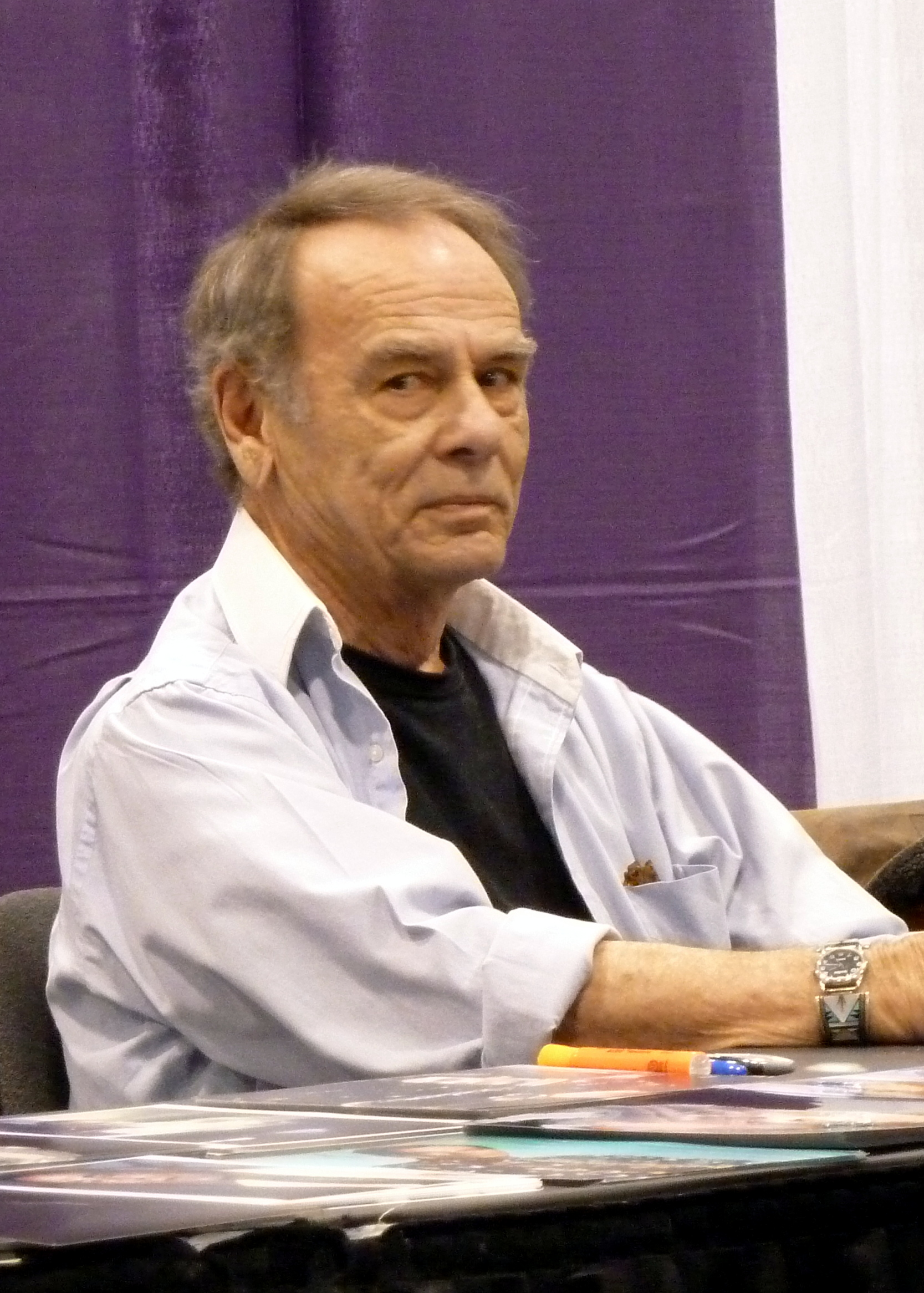
Dean Stockwell

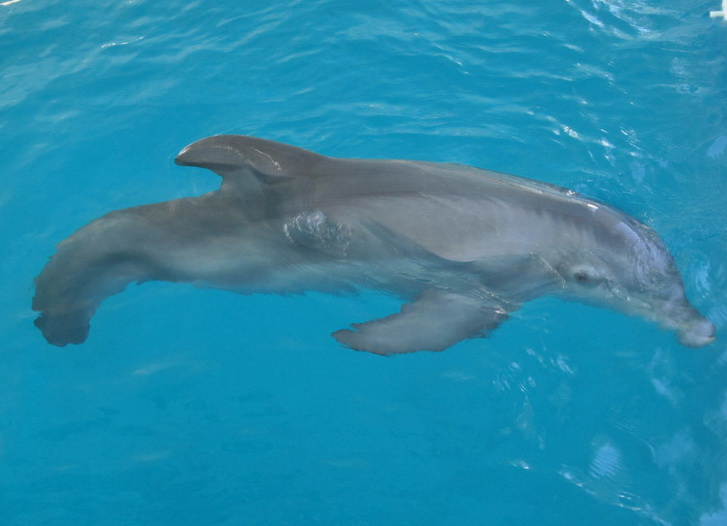
Winter

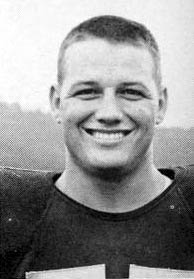
Sam Huff

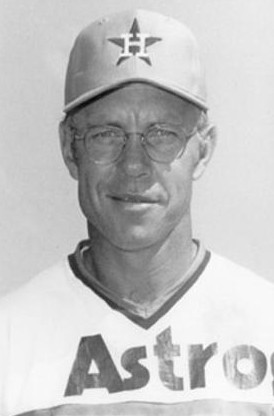
Bill Virdon

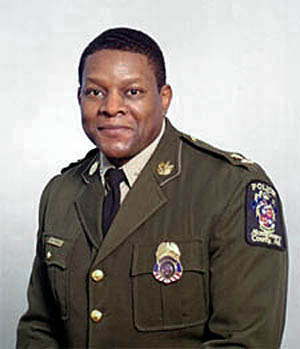
Charles Moose

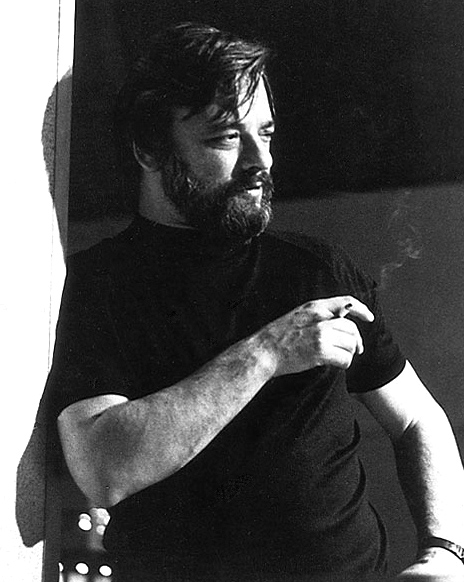
Stephen Sondheim

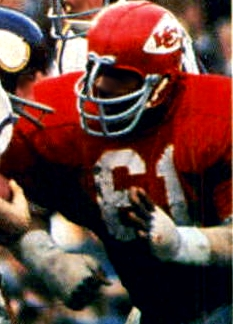
Curley Culp

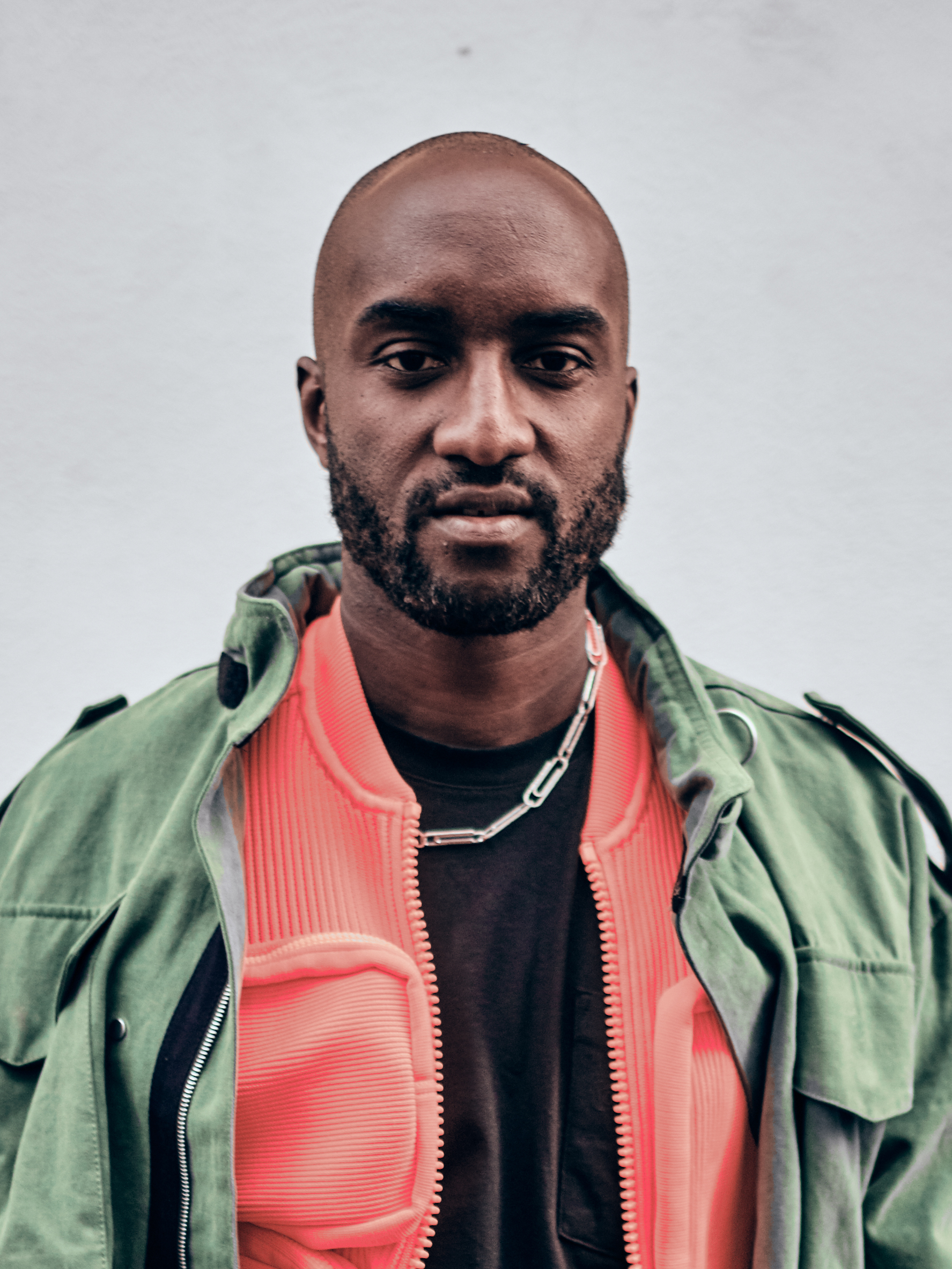
Virgil Abloh

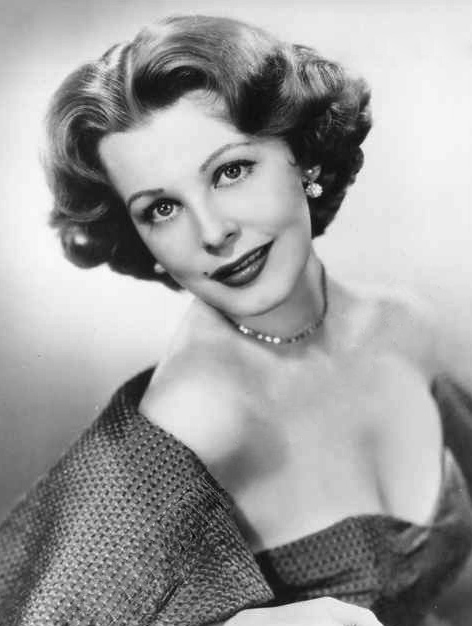
Arlene Dahl

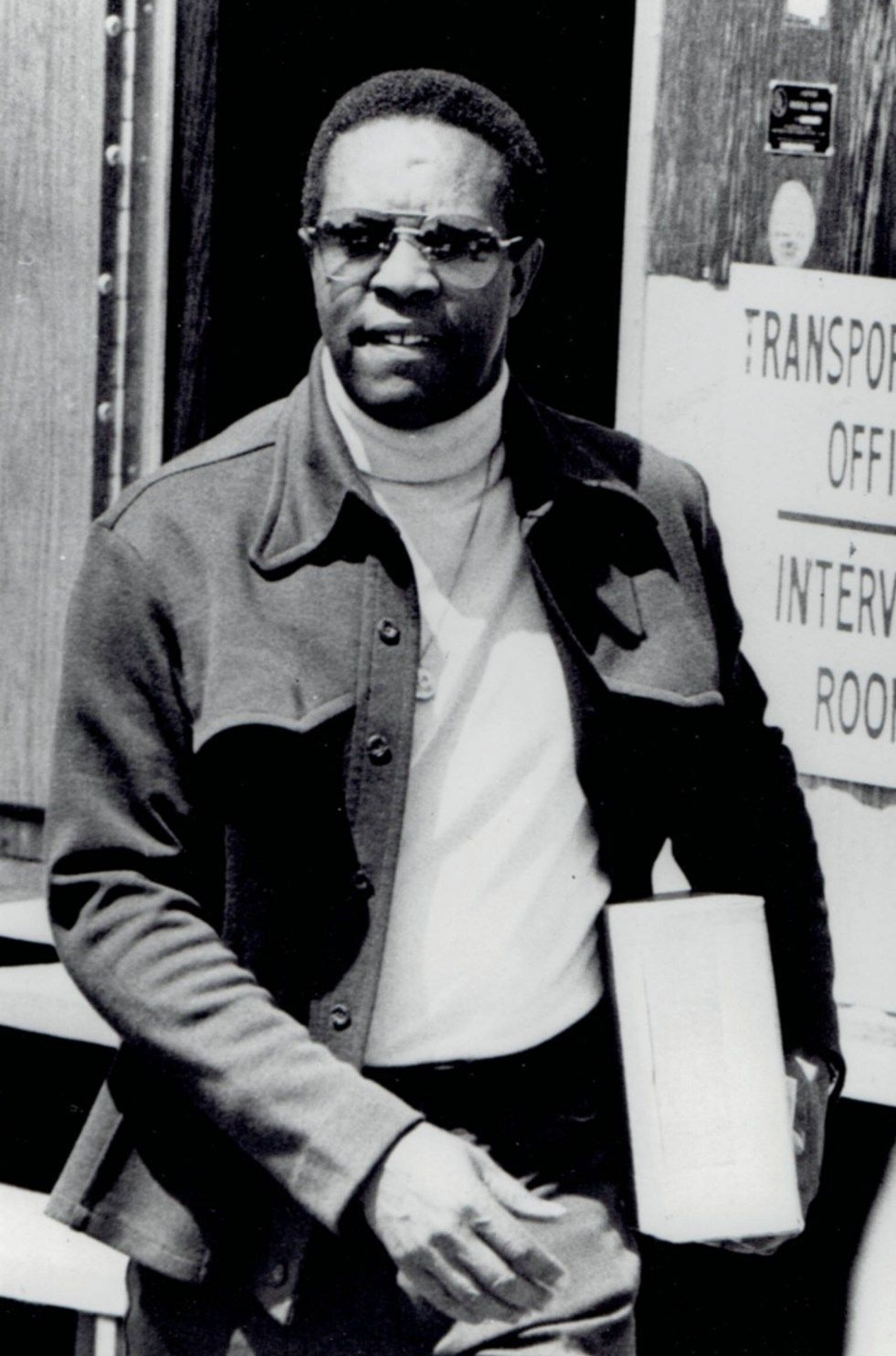
Lee Elder

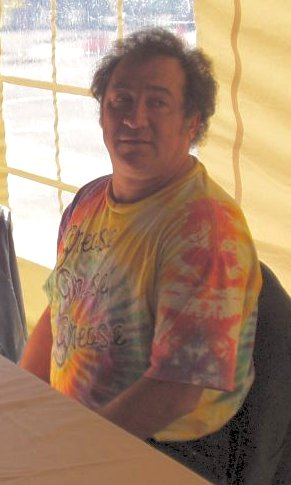
Eddie Mekka

- November 1
  - Aaron Beck, 100, psychiatrist (Cognitive therapy, Beck Depression Inventory), co-founder of the Beck Institute for Cognitive Behavior Therapy (b. 1921)
  - Emmett Chapman, 85, jazz musician (b. 1936)
  - Pat Martino, 77, jazz guitarist and composer (b. 1944)
  - Lawrence Donald Soens, 95, Roman Catholic prelate, bishop of Sioux City (1983–1998) (b. 1926)
  - William Spaulding, 97, politician, member of the Council of the District of Columbia (1975–1987) (b. 1924)
- November 2
  - John Aiken, 89, ice hockey player (Montreal Canadiens) (b. 1932)
  - Jane Brown Grimes, 80, Hall of Fame tennis executive, president of the United States Tennis Association (2007–2008) (b. 1941)
  - Flora D. Crittenden, 97, educator and politician, member of the Virginia House of Delegates (1993–2004) (b. 1924)
  - Paul A. Libby, 100, fluid dynamicist and academic (b. 1921)
  - John Marshall, 76, football player (San Francisco 49ers, Seattle Seahawks, Green Bay Packers) (b. 1945)
  - Dennis Moore, 75, politician and lawyer, member of the U.S. House of Representatives (1999–2011) (b. 1945)
  - Declan Mulligan, 83, Irish-born American rock musician (The Beau Brummels) (b. 1938)
  - Neal Smith, 101, politician, member of the U.S. House of Representatives (1959–1995) (b. 1920)
- November 3
  - Wilma Chan, 72, politician, member of the California State Assembly (2000–2006) and the Alameda County Board of Supervisors (1995–2000, since 2011) (b. 1949)
  - Tom Matte, 82, football player (Baltimore Colts) (b. 1939)
  - Warren Powers, 80, football player (Oakland Raiders) and coach (Missouri Tigers, Washington State Cougars) (b. 1941)
- November 4
  - Barbara-Rose Collins, 82, politician, member of the U.S. House of Representatives (1991–1997) (b. 1939)
  - Aaron Feuerstein, 95, industrialist and philanthropist, CEO of Malden Mills (b. 1925)
  - Ruth Ann Minner, 86, politician, governor of Delaware (2001–2009), member of the Delaware House of Representatives (1975–1983) and Senate (1983–1993) (b. 1935)
  - Mike Pitts, 61, football player (Philadelphia Eagles, Atlanta Falcons, New England Patriots) (b. 1960)
  - Claude Nelson Warren, 89, anthropologist (b. 1932)
  - Roger Zatkoff, 90, football player (Green Bay Packers, Detroit Lions) (b. 1931)
- November 5
  - Charlie Burns, 85, American-born Canadian ice hockey player (Minnesota North Stars, Boston Bruins, Pittsburgh Penguins) (b. 1936)
  - Robert S. Kiss, 63, politician, speaker of the West Virginia House of Delegates (1997–2007) (b. 1957)
  - Ross Tolleson, 65, politician (b. 1956)
- November 6
  - Peter Aykroyd, 66, Canadian comedian (Saturday Night Live) and actor (Coneheads, Nothing but Trouble) (b. 1955)
  - Angelo Mosca, 84, Hall of Fame football player (Hamilton Tiger-Cats, Ottawa Rough Riders) and professional wrestler (NWA) (b. 1937)
  - Shawn Rhoden, 46, Jamaican-American professional bodybuilder, Mr. Olympia winner (2018) (b. 1975)
  - Harvey White, 83, football player (Boston Patriots) (b. 1938)
- November 7
  - Dean Stockwell, 85, actor (Quantum Leap, Married to the Mob, Paris, Texas) (b. 1936)
  - Ronnie Williams, 59, basketball player (Florida Gators, Tampa Bay Thrillers, Mississippi Jets) (b. 1962)
- November 8
  - Medina Dixon, 59, basketball player (Old Dominion Lady Monarchs), Olympic bronze medalist (1992) (b. 1962)
  - Margo Guryan, 84, singer-songwriter ("Sunday Mornin'") (b. 1937)
  - Peter Zimroth, 78, attorney (b. 1943)
- November 9
  - Max Cleland, 79, politician, senator (1997–2003), Georgia secretary of state (1983–1996) and administrator of veterans affairs (1977–1981) (b. 1942)
  - Jerry Douglas, 88, actor (The Young and the Restless) (b. 1932)
  - Willis Forko, 37, Liberian-American footballer (Real Salt Lake, Bodø/Glimt, national team) (b. 1983)
  - Larry Gordon, 76, musician (b. 1945)
  - Richard Kyanka, 45, blogger, founder of Something Awful (b. 1976)
  - Duane Wilson, 87, baseball player (Boston Red Sox) (b. 1934)
- November 10
  - Delma Cowart, 80, racing driver (b. 1941)
  - Clyde Emrich, 90, Olympic weightlifter and football coach (Chicago Bears) (b. 1931)
  - Bob Gill, 90, illustrator and graphic designer (b. 1931)
  - Ed Lucas, 82, sportswriter (New York Yankees) (b. 1939)
  - Lloyd McCuiston, 103, politician, member (1961–1994) and speaker (1981–1983) of the Arkansas House of Representatives (b. 1918)
- November 11
  - Germain Belzile, economist (b. 1957)
  - Glen de Vries, 49, businessman and space tourist (Blue Origin NS-18) (b. 1972)
  - Harris W. Fawell, 92, politician, member of the U.S. House of Representatives (1985–1999) and the Illinois Senate (1963–1977) (b. 1929)
  - John Goodsall, 68, American-British rock guitarist (Atomic Rooster, Brand X) (b. 1953)
  - Jay Last, 92, physicist (b. 1929)
  - Edward L. Sadowsky, 92, politician, member of the New York City Council (1962–1985) (b. 1929)
  - Art Stewart, 94, baseball scout (b. 1927)
  - Winter, 16, dolphin with a prosthetic tail, subject of Dolphin Tale (b. 2006)
- November 12
  - Bob Bondurant, 88, Hall of Fame racing driver (Formula One) and instructor (b. 1933)
  - Stephen H. Davis, 82, mathematician (b. 1939)
  - Hugh Leatherman, 90, politician, member (since 1981) and president pro tempore (2014–2019) of the South Carolina Senate (b. 1931)
  - Bill Reichart, 86, Canadian-born American Olympic ice hockey player (1964) (b. 1935)
  - Rock Hard Ten, 20, thoroughbred racehorse and sire (b. 2001)
- November 13
  - Ed Bullins, 86, playwright (Goin' a Buffalo) (b. 1935)
  - Gilbert Harman, 83, philosopher (b. 1938)
  - Sam Huff, 87, Hall of Fame football player (New York Giants, Washington Redskins) and commentator (b. 1934)
  - Philip Margo, 79, musician (The Tokens) (b. 1942)
  - Petra Mayer, 46, book review editor (NPR) (b. 1974–1975)
  - William Wright, 69, American-born Australian Roman Catholic prelate, bishop of Maitland-Newcastle (2011–2021) (b. 1952)
- November 14
  - W. Sterling Cary, 94, Christian minister (b. 1927)
  - Alex D. Dickson, 95, Anglican prelate, bishop of West Tennessee (1983–1994) (b. 1926)
  - Heath Freeman, 41, actor (Raising the Bar, Bones, Skateland) (b. 1980)
  - Jerry Johnson, 77, baseball player (Philadelphia Phillies, San Francisco Giants, San Diego Padres) (b. 1943)
  - Thomas Porteous, 74, jurist, judge of the U.S. District Court for Eastern Louisiana (1994–2010) (b. 1946)
  - Christopher Walls, 16, student (Hallandale High School)
- November 16
  - Bobby Collins, 88, football coach (Southern Miss Golden Eagles, SMU Mustangs) (b. 1933)
  - Drew Gibbs, 59, football coach (Kean Cougars) (b. 1962)
  - Larry J. Hopkins, 88, politician, member of the U.S. House of Representatives (1979–1993) (b. 1933)
- November 17
  - Gene Carter, 86, lawyer and jurist, judge of the U.S. District Court for Maine (since 1983) (b. 1935)
  - Jimmie Durham, 81, sculptor and poet (b. 1940)
  - Dave Frishberg, 88, jazz musician (b. 1933)
  - Art LaFleur, 78, actor (Field of Dreams, The Sandlot, The Santa Clause 2) (b. 1943)
  - Stu Rasmussen, 73, politician, mayor of Silverton, Oregon (2009–2015) (b. 1948)
  - Young Dolph, 36, rapper (b. 1985)
- November 18
  - Peter Buck, 90, restaurateur, co-founder of Subway (b. 1930)
  - Slide Hampton, 89, jazz trombonist (b. 1932)
  - Sue Picus, 73, contract bridge player (b. 1948)
  - William Evan Sanders, 101, Episcopalian prelate, bishop of East Tennessee (1985–1992) (b. 1919)
- November 19
  - Julie Belaga, 91, politician, member of the Connecticut House of Representatives (1977–1987) (b. 1930)
  - Rod Blackburn, 82, ice hockey player (New Hampshire Wildcats) (b. 1939)
  - Ian Fishback, 42, army officer and whistleblower (b. 1979)
  - Don Kojis, 82, basketball player (Detroit Pistons, San Diego Rockets, Seattle SuperSonics) (b. 1939)
  - Bernard Rollin, 78, philosopher and academic (b. 1943)
  - Will Ryan, 72, voice actor (The Land Before Time, The Little Mermaid, An American Tail) and singer (b. 1949)
- November 20
  - Billy Hinsche, 70, musician (Dino, Desi & Billy, The Beach Boys) (b. 1951)
  - Steve Smith, 57, football player (Los Angeles Raiders, Seattle Seahawks) (b. 1964)
- November 21
  - Yul Anderson, 63, musician (b. 1958)
  - Robert Bly, 94, poet (Iron John: A Book About Men, The Sibling Society) (b. 1926)
  - Mary Brown, 86, politician, member of the Michigan House of Representatives (1977–1994) (b. 1935)
  - Lou Cutell, 91, actor (Pee-wee's Big Adventure, Betty White's Off Their Rockers, Seinfeld) (b. 1930)
  - Marcella LeBeau, 102, Lakota politician, nurse and World War II veteran (b. 1919)
  - Ralph Miller, 88, Olympic alpine skier (1956) (b. 1933)
  - Scott Robbe, 66, television and film producer (Seven and a Match, Queer Eye) (b. 1955)
- November 22
  - Erhaab, 30, Thoroughbred race horse (b. 1991)
  - Noah Gordon, 95, novelist (The Physician) (b. 1926)
  - Doug Hill, 71, meteorologist (WUSA, WJLA-TV) (b. 1950)
  - Susan V. John, 64, politician, member of the New York State Assembly (1991–2010) (b. 1957)
  - Doug Jones, 64, baseball player (Milwaukee Brewers, Cleveland Indians, Oakland Athletics) (b. 1957)
  - Joanne Shenandoah, 64, singer and composer (b. 1956 or 1957)
  - Sylvia Weinstock, 91, baker (b. 1930)
- November 23
  - Don Shondell, 92, volleyball coach (b. 1929)
  - Bill Virdon, 90, baseball player (St. Louis Cardinals, Pittsburgh Pirates) and manager (Houston Astros) (b. 1931)
- November 24
  - Lisa Brown, 67, actress (As the World Turns, Guiding Light) (b. 1954)
  - U. L. Gooch, 98, aviator and politician, member of the Kansas Senate (1993–2004) (b. 1923)
  - Marilyn McLeod, 82, singer-songwriter ("Love Hangover", "You Can't Turn Me Off (In the Middle of Turning Me On)") (b. 1939)
  - Jim Warren, 85, computer scientist, co-founder of the West Coast Computer Faire and Dr. Dobb's Journal (b. 1936)
- November 25
  - Charles Moose, 68, author and police officer (D.C. sniper attacks), chief of the Montgomery County Police Department (1999–2003) (b. 1953)
  - Anne Rudin, 97, politician, mayor of Sacramento (1983–1992) (b. 1924)
- November 26
  - Buster Guzzardo, 98, politician, member of the Louisiana House of Representatives (1987–1996) (b. 1923)
  - Don Phillips, 80, casting director (Dog Day Afternoon, Fast Times at Ridgemont High) and producer (Melvin and Howard) (b. 1940)
  - Mark Roth, 70, bowler (b. 1951)
  - Stephen Sondheim, 91, composer and lyricist (West Side Story, Company, Sweeney Todd: The Demon Barber of Fleet Street), nine-time Tony winner (b. 1930)
- November 27
  - Adolfo, 98, Cuban-born American fashion designer (b. 1923)
  - Curley Culp, 75, Hall of Fame football player (Kansas City Chiefs, Houston Oilers, Detroit Lions), Super Bowl champion (1970) (b. 1946)
  - Gregory J. Hobbs Jr., 76, judge (b. 1944)
  - Shirley McBay, 86, mathematician and activist (b. 1935)
  - Ed McClanahan, 89, novelist and essayist (b. 1932)
  - Eddie Mekka, 69, actor (Laverne & Shirley) (b. 1952)
- November 28
  - Virgil Abloh, 41, fashion designer, founder and CEO of Off-White (since 2012) (b. 1980)
  - Doyle Hamm, 64, convicted murderer and botched execution survivor (b. 1957)
  - Chuck Hazama, 89, politician, mayor of Rochester, Minnesota (1979–1995) (b. 1932)
  - Emmit King, 62, Olympic sprinter (1984, 1988) (b. 1959)
  - Carrie Meek, 95, politician, member of the U.S. House of Representatives (1993–2003) (b. 1926)
  - Jolene Unsoeld, 89, politician, member of the Washington (1985–1989) and the U.S. House of Representatives (1989–1995) (b. 1931)
- November 29
  - Otis Anderson Jr., 23, football player (UCF Knights) (b. 1998)
  - Arlene Dahl, 96, actress (Journey to the Center of the Earth, A Southern Yankee, Reign of Terror) (b. 1925)
  - Don Demeter, 86, baseball player (Los Angeles Dodgers, Philadelphia Phillies, Detroit Tigers) (b. 1935)
  - Lee Elder, 87, golfer and first African American to play in the Masters (b. 1934)
  - LaMarr Hoyt, 66, baseball player (Chicago White Sox, San Diego Padres) (b. 1955) (death announced on this date)
  - C. J. Hunter, 52, Olympic shot putter (1996) and coach, world champion (1999) (b. 1968)
  - Bruce William Kauffman, 86, jurist, judge for the U.S. District Court for Eastern Pennsylvania (1997–2009) (b. 1934)
  - Tommy Lane, 83, actor (Live and Let Die, Shaft) (b. 1938–1939)
- November 30
  - Albert Bustamante, 86, politician, member of the U.S. House of Representatives (1985–1993) (b. 1935)
  - Dave Draper, 79, bodybuilder, actor (Lord Love a Duck, Don't Make Waves) and author (b. 1942)
  - Philip Heymann, 89, lawyer, deputy attorney general (1993–1994) (b. 1932)
  - Marcus Lamb, 64, televangelist, founder of Daystar (b. 1957)
  - Mary Maher, 81, American-born Irish trade unionist, feminist and journalist (b. 1940)
  - Kal Rudman, 91, disc jockey, founder of the Kal and Lucille Rudman Foundation (b. 1930)
  - Marjorie Tallchief, 95, ballerina (b. 1926)

== December ==
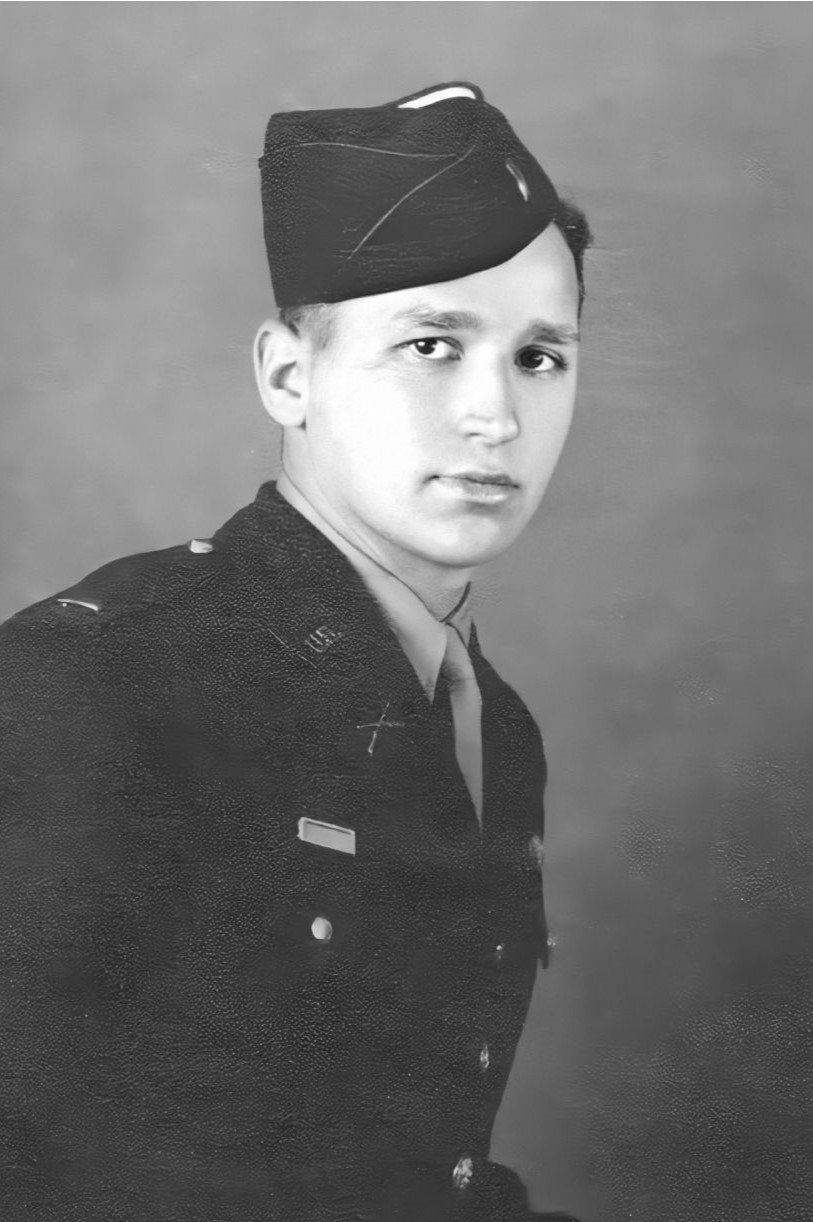
Edward Shames

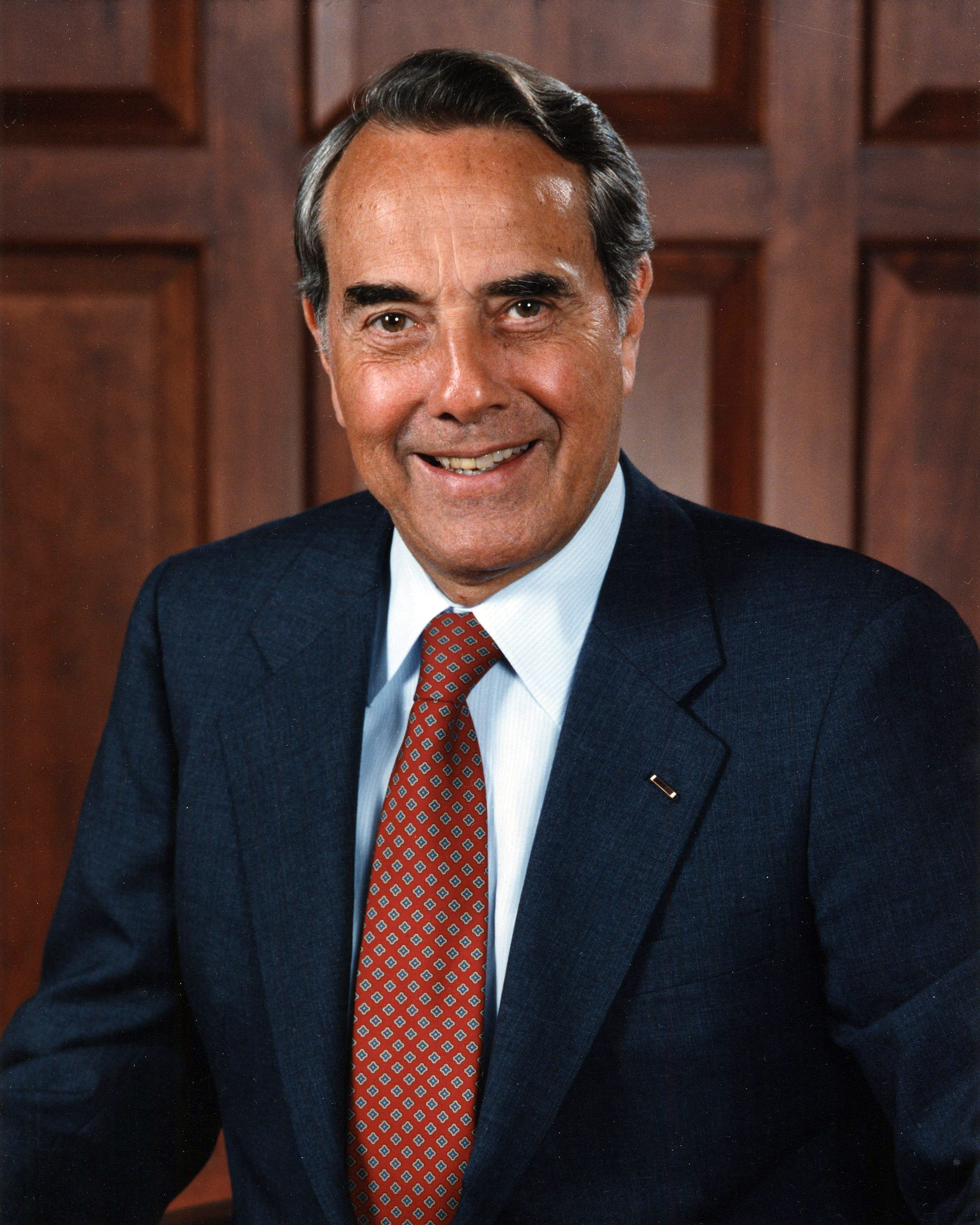
Bob Dole

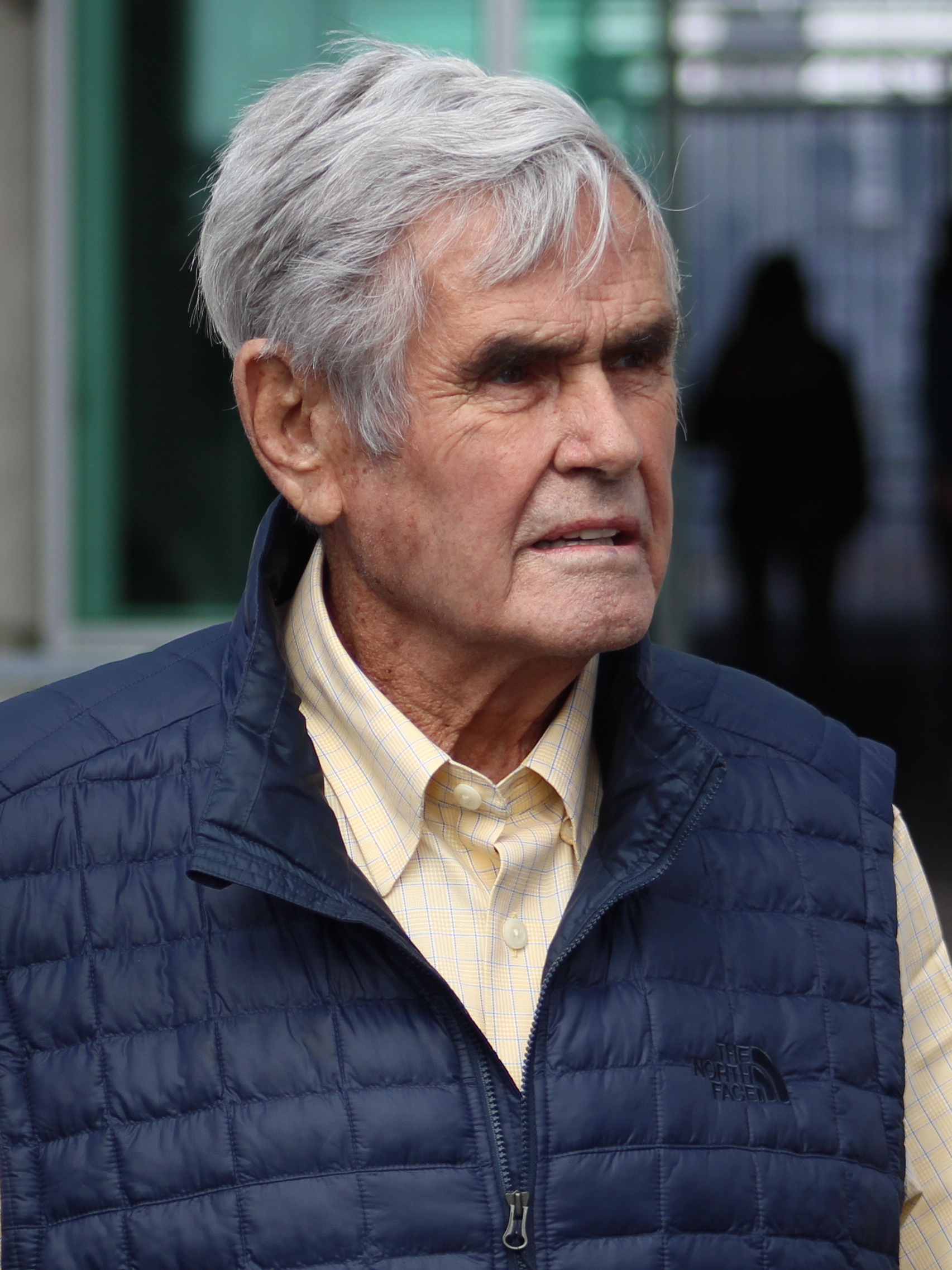
Al Unser

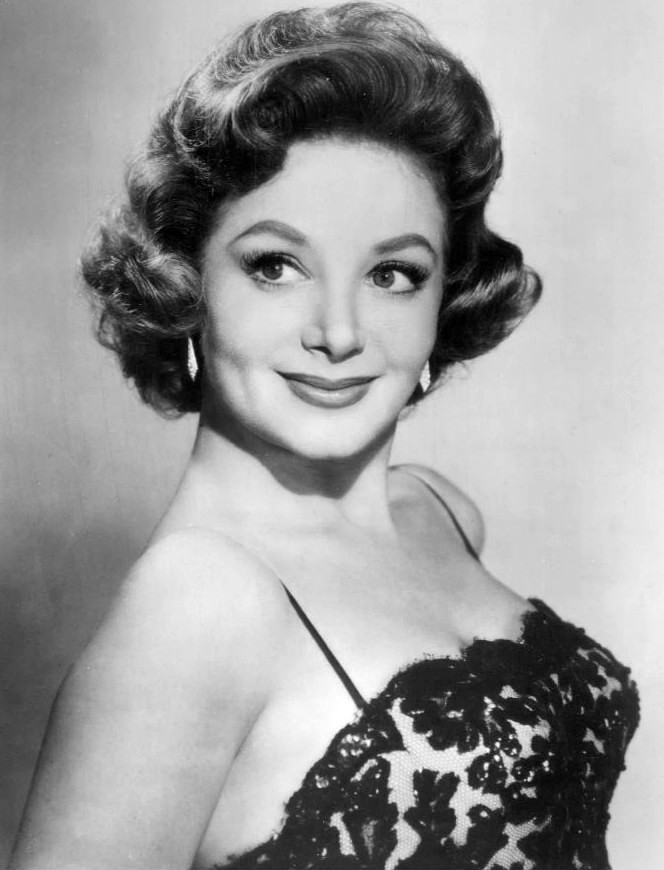
Cara Williams

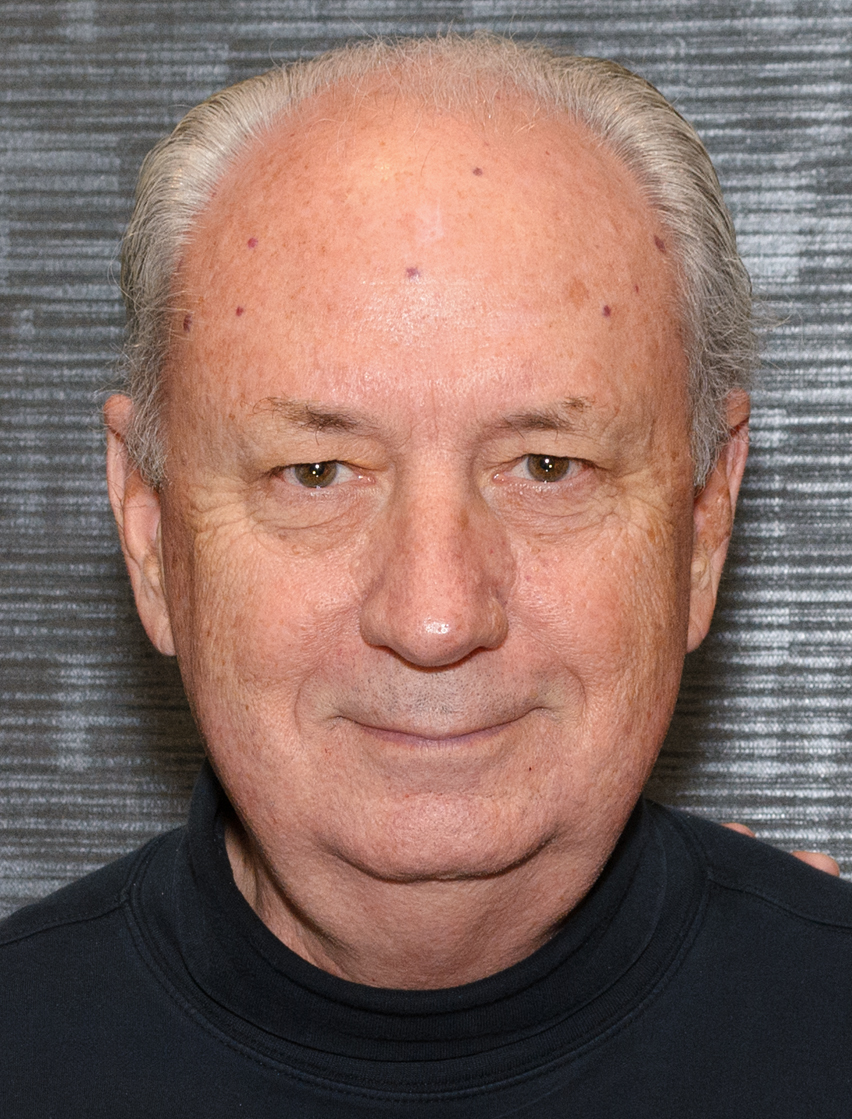
Michael Nesmith

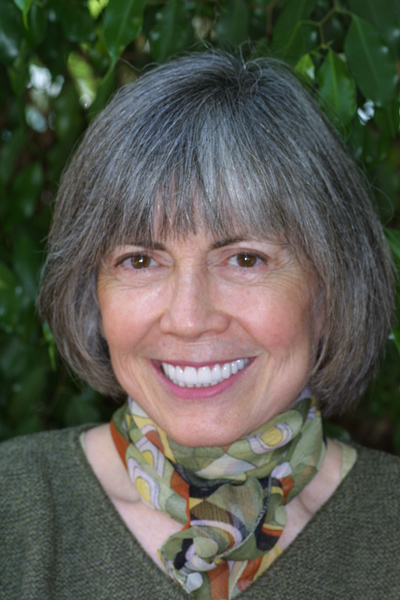
Anne Rice

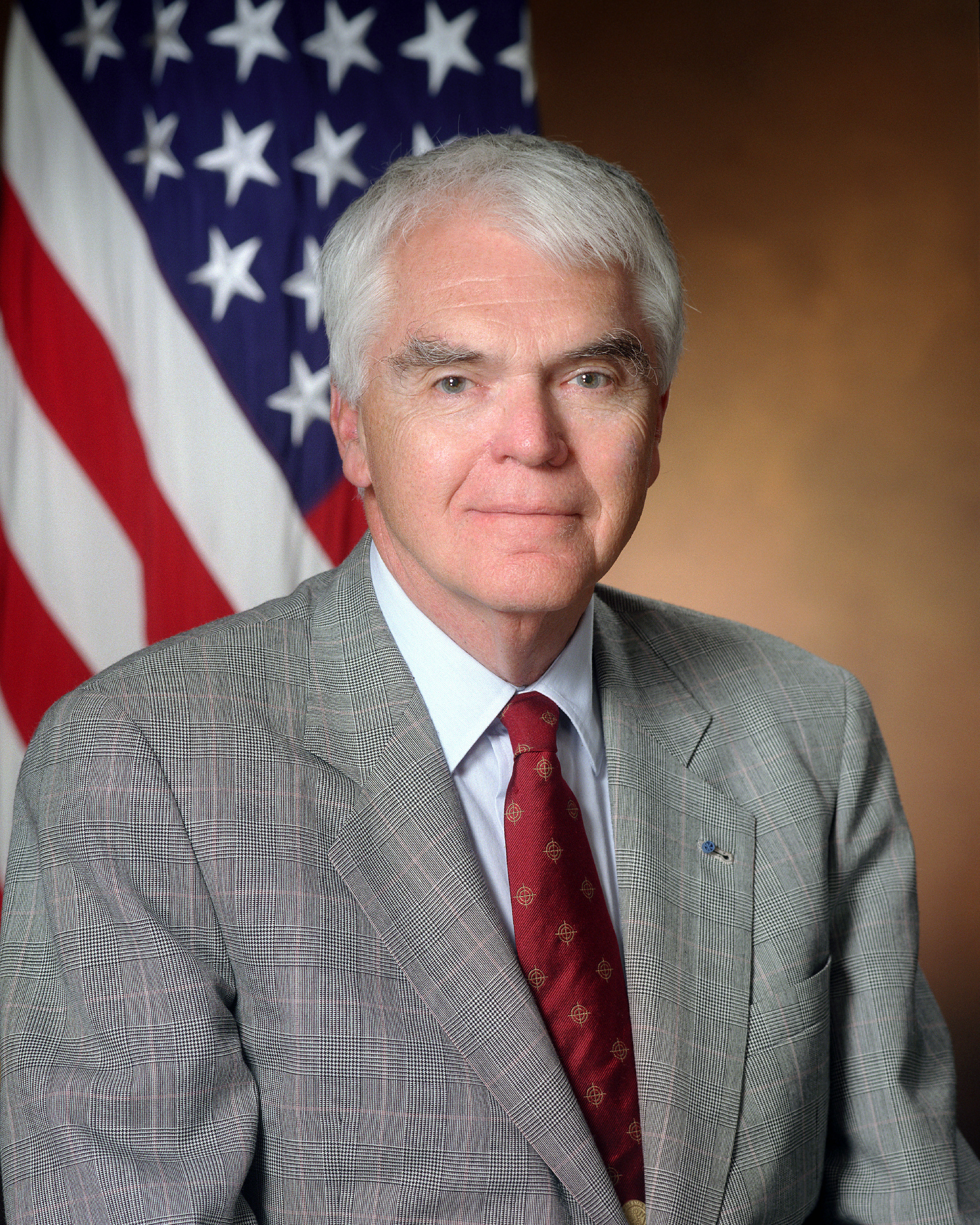
Hans Mark

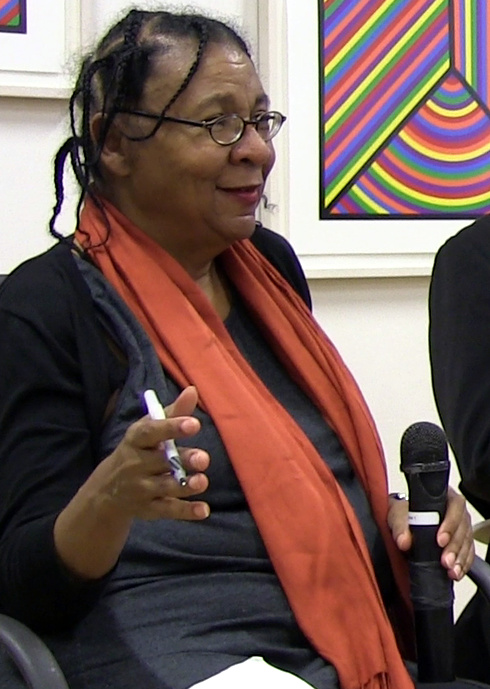
bell hooks

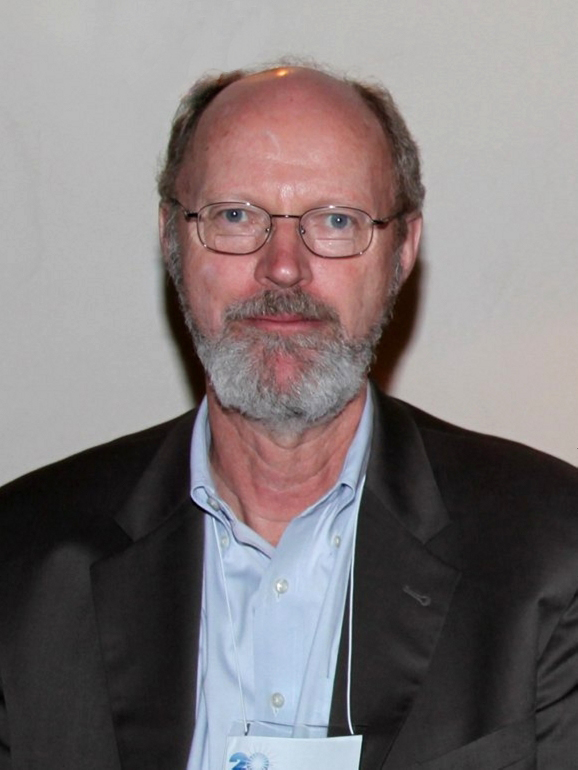
Robert H. Grubbs

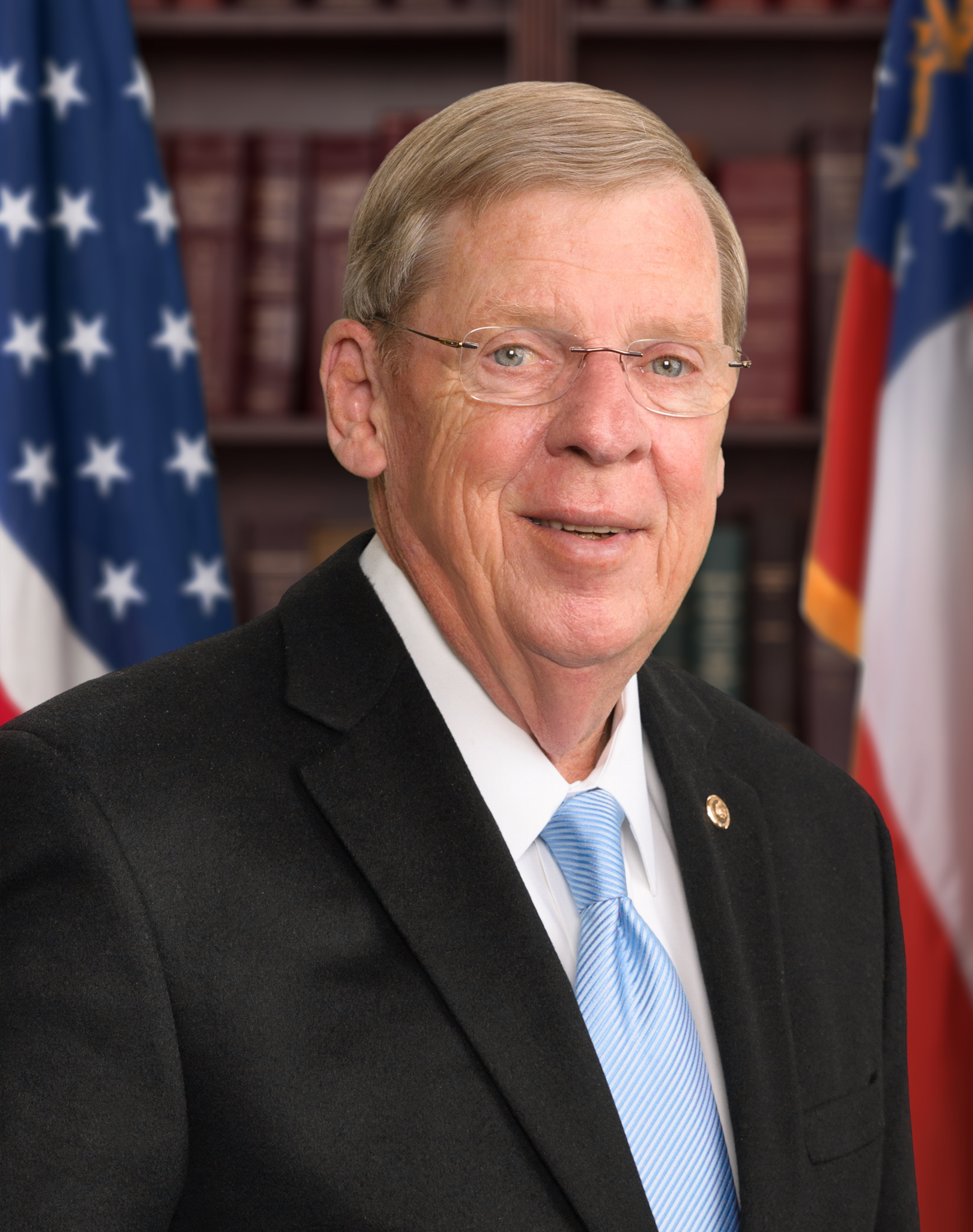
Johnny Isakson

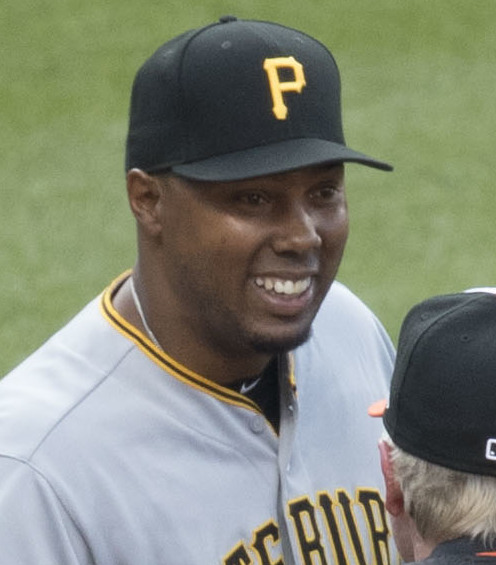
Kimera Bartee

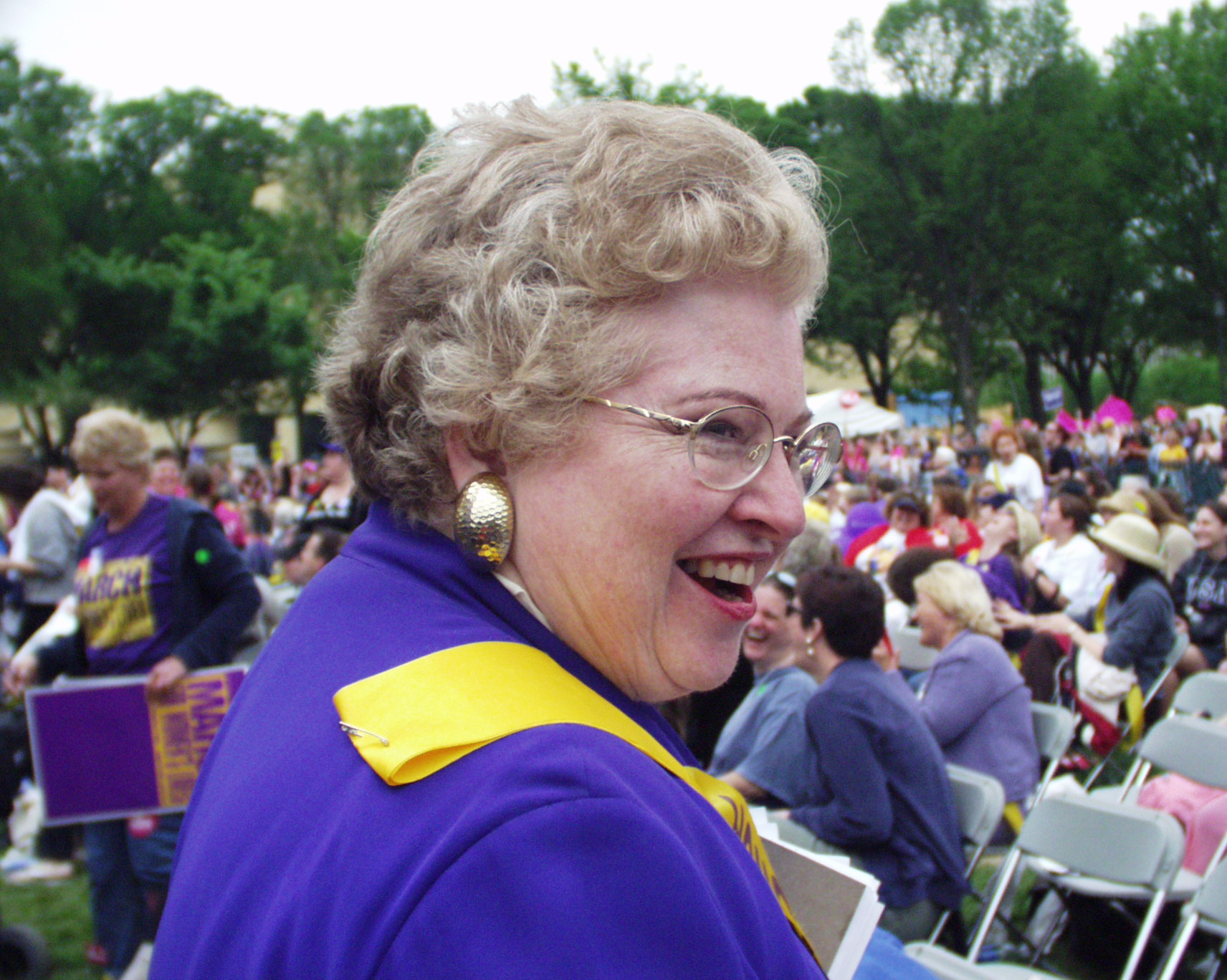
Sarah Weddington

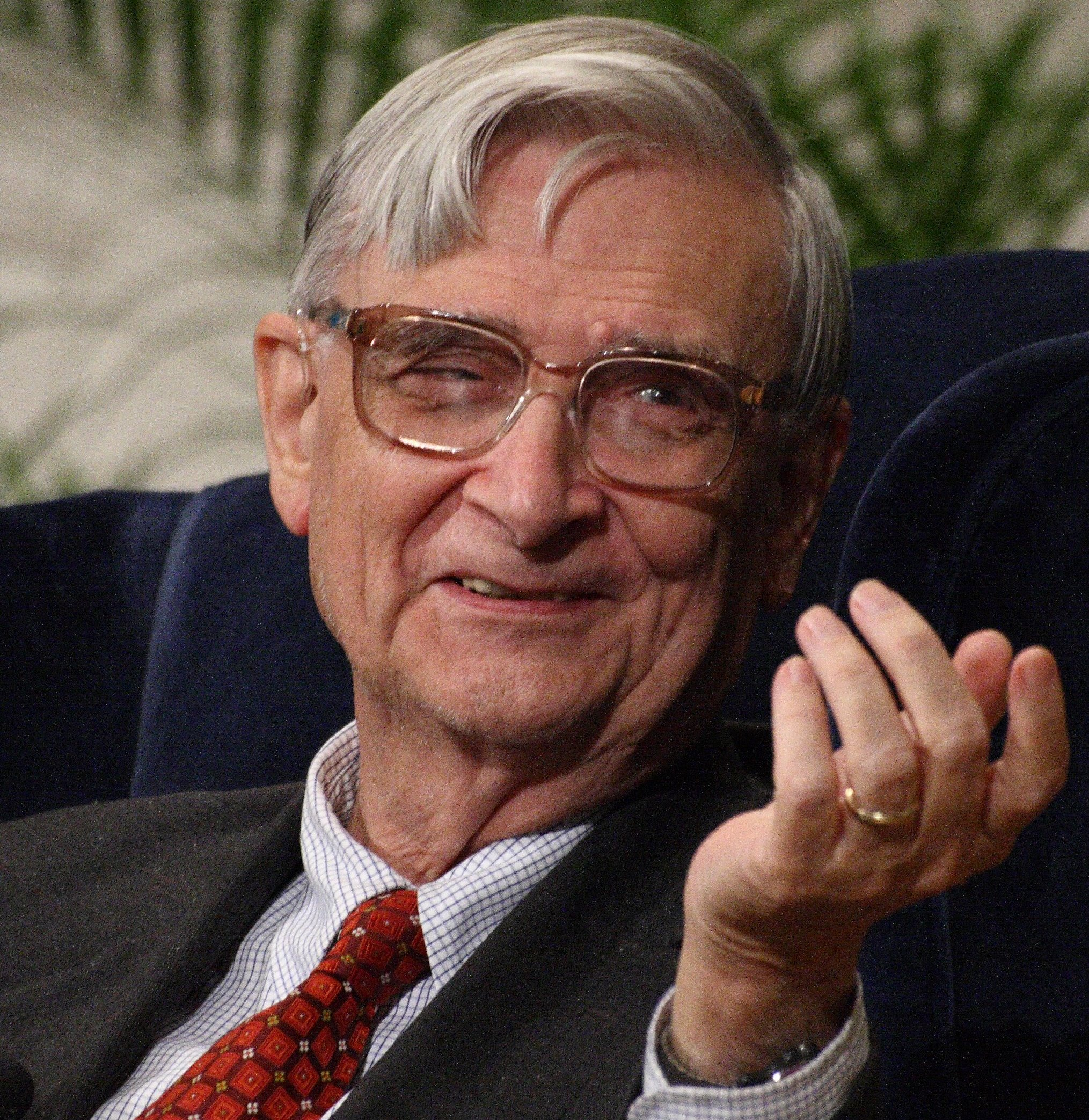
E. O. Wilson

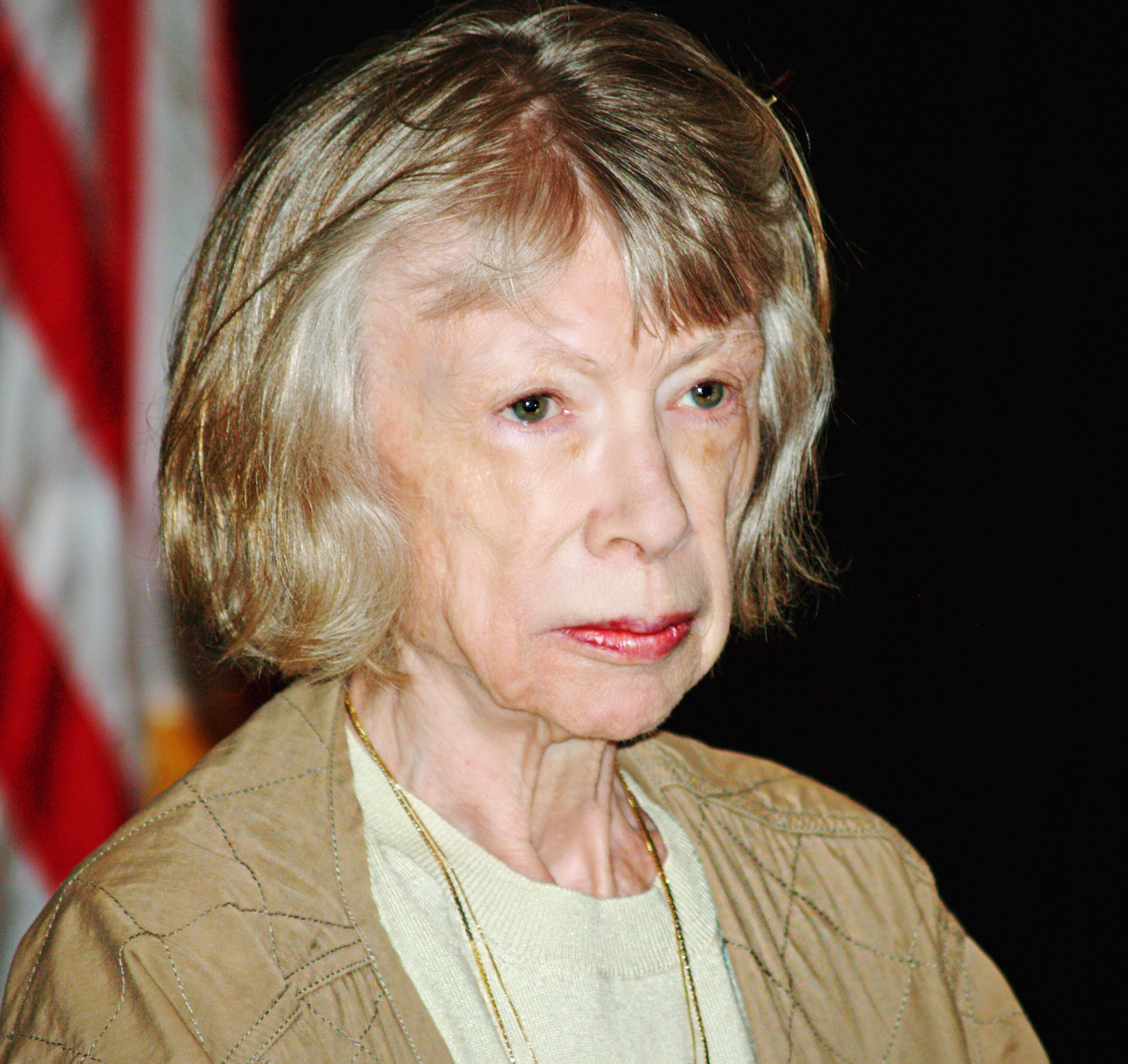
Joan Didion

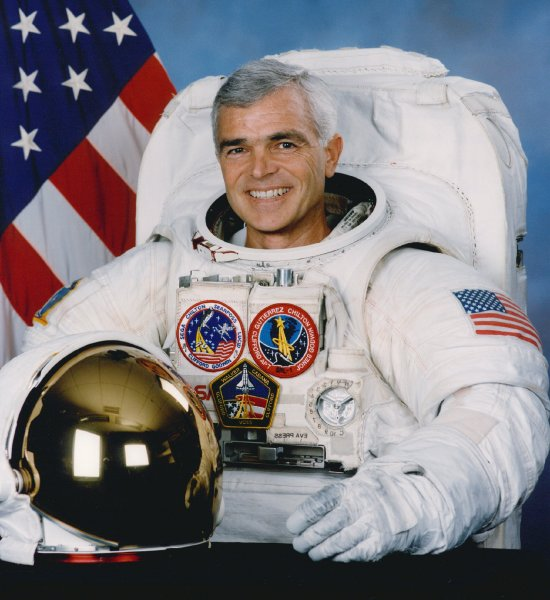
Michael R. Clifford

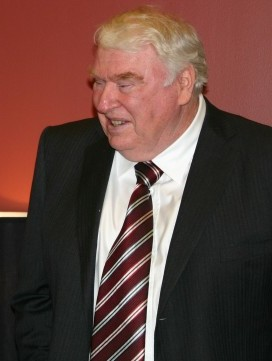
John Madden

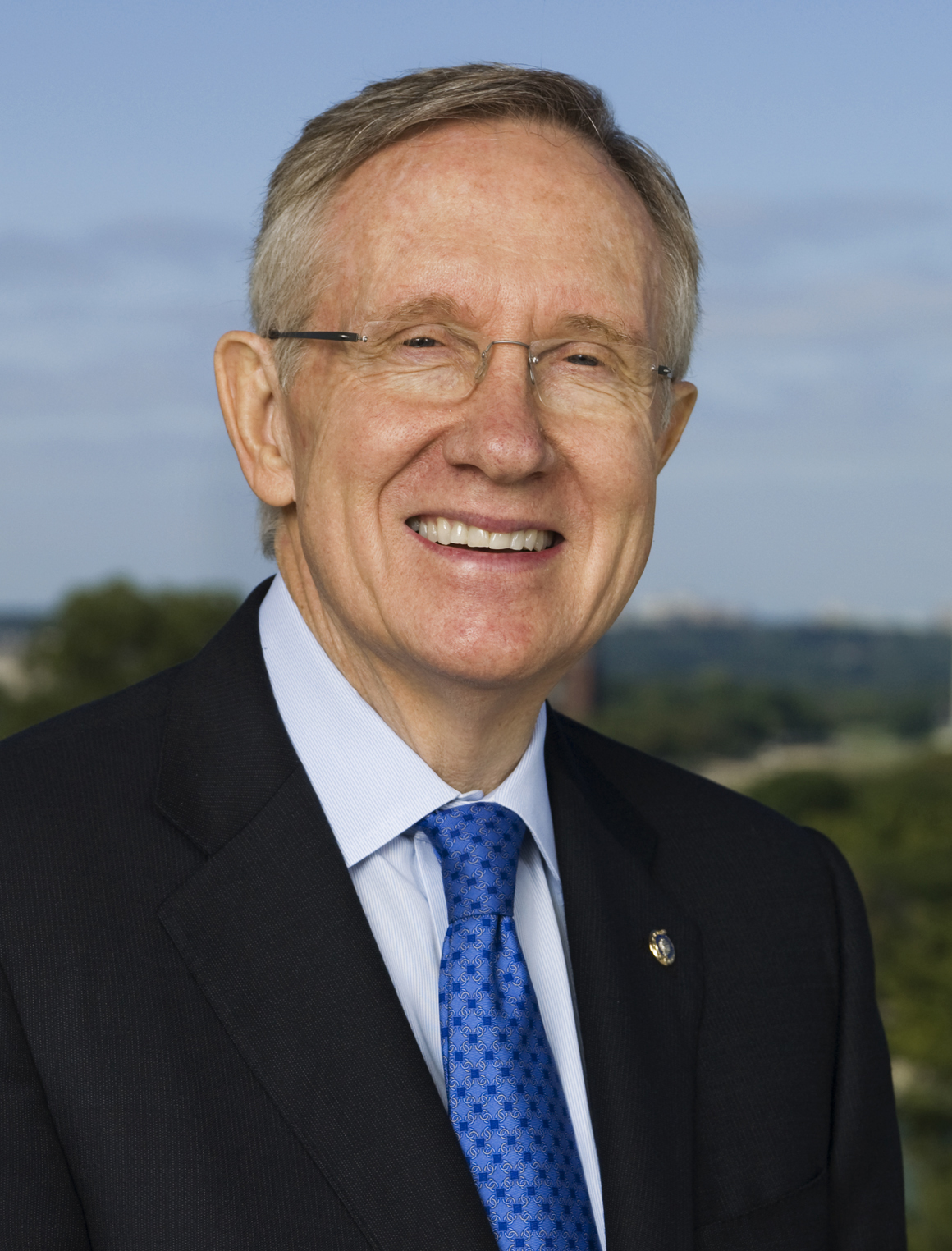
Harry Reid

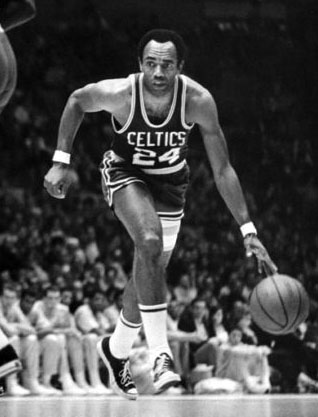
Sam Jones

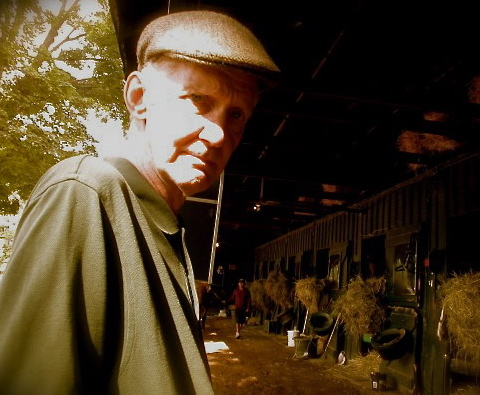
Billy Turner

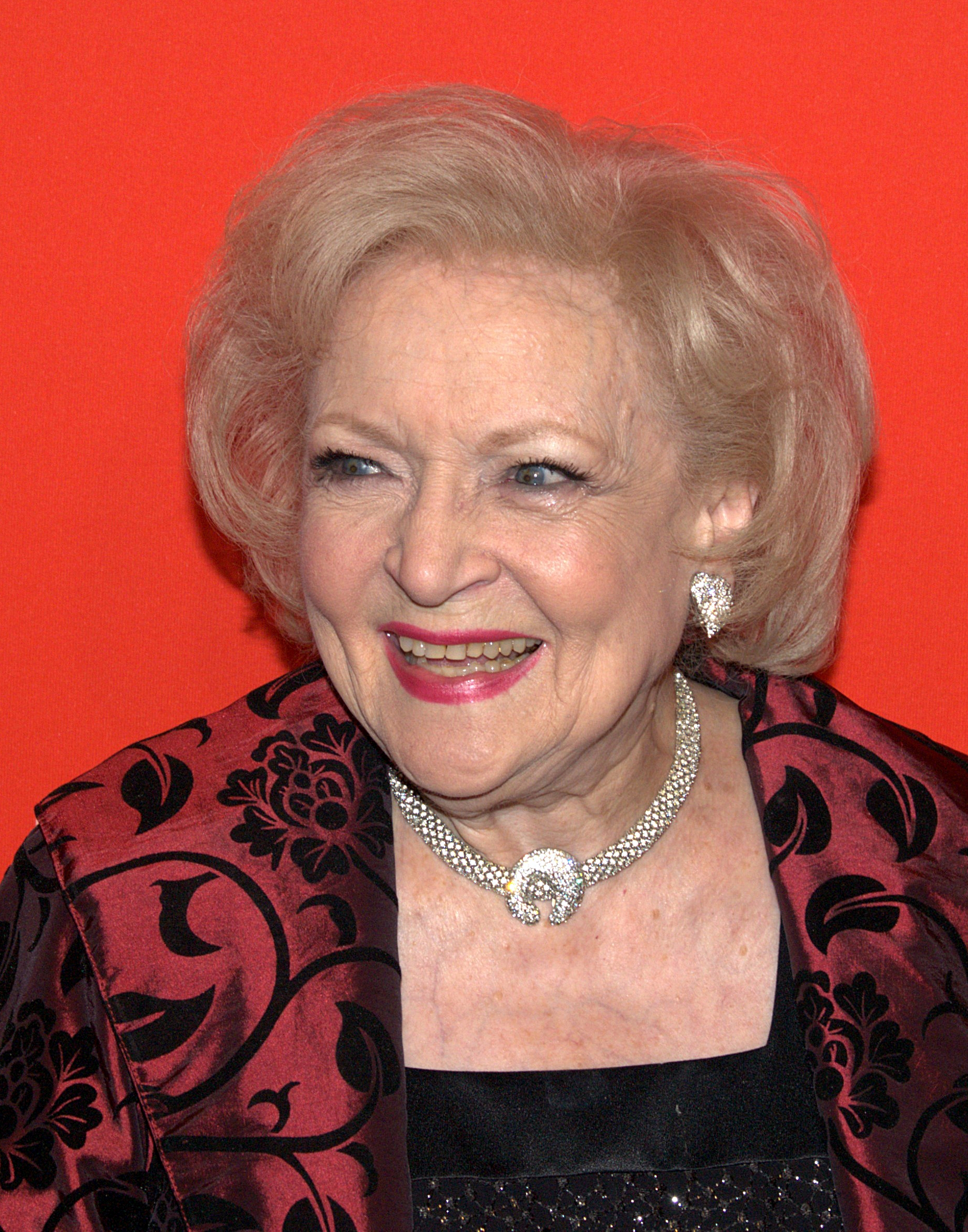
Betty White

- December 1
  - Jacqueline Avant, 81, philanthropist (b. 1940)
  - Ben Boo, 96, politician, mayor of Duluth (1967–1975), member of the Minnesota House of Representatives (1984–1993) (b. 1925)
  - Alvin Lucier, 90, composer (b. 1931)
  - Suzette Winter, 90, filmmaker (b. 1921)
- December 2
  - Richard Costello, 70, police officer (b. 1951)
  - Darlene Hard, 85, Hall of Fame tennis player (b. 1936)
  - Richard Lerner, 83, chemist (b. 1938)
  - Alex Orban, 82, Hungarian-American Olympic sabre fencer (1968, 1972, 1976) (b. 1939)
  - Lawrence Weiner, 79, conceptual artist (b. 1942)
- December 3
  - Claude Humphrey, 77, Hall of Fame football player (Atlanta Falcons, Philadelphia Eagles) (b. 1944)
  - Denis O'Brien, 80, talent manager (George Harrison) and film producer (Monty Python's Life of Brian, Time Bandits) (b. 1941)
  - Melvin Parker, 77, drummer (James Brown) (b. 1944)
  - Edward Shames, 99, U.S. Army colonel and last surviving officer of Easy Company (b. 1922)
  - Charlotte Mailliard Shultz, 88, socialite (b. 1933)
- December 4
  - Martha De Laurentiis, 67, film producer (Breakdown, Hannibal, U-571) (b. 1954)
  - Stonewall Jackson, 89, country music singer ("Waterloo", "B.J. the D.J.", "I Washed My Hands in Muddy Water") (b. 1932)
  - Shirley Zussman, 107, sex therapist (b. 1914)
- December 5
  - Bob Dole, 98, politician, member of the U.S. House of Representatives (1961–1969) and Senate (1969–1996), Republican nominee for president in 1996 (b. 1923)
  - Bill Glass, 86, Hall of Fame football player (Saskatchewan Roughriders, Detroit Lions, Cleveland Browns) (b. 1935)
  - Buddy Merrill, 85, steel guitarist (The Lawrence Welk Show) (b. 1936)
  - Scott Page-Pagter, 52, voice actor and television producer (Power Rangers) (b. 1969)
  - Bill Staines, 74, folk musician (b. 1947)
- December 6
  - George Fleming, 84, football player (Oakland Raiders, Winnipeg Blue Bombers) and politician (b. 1937)
  - Glenn Foster, 31, football player (New Orleans Saints) (b. 1990)
  - Fred Hiatt, 66, journalist, editor, and columnist (The Washington Post) (b. 1955)
  - Medina Spirit, 3, Thoroughbred racehorse, Kentucky Derby winner (2021) (b. 2018)
  - Jerome Lyle Rappaport, 94, lawyer, political leader, and real estate developer (b. 1927)
  - Julius S. Scott, 66, author (The Common Wind) (b. 1955)
- December 7
  - Lionel Antoine, 71, football player (Chicago Bears) (b. 1950)
  - Carol Jenkins Barnett, 65, businesswoman (Publix) (b. 1956)
  - Joe Hernandez, 81, football player (Toronto Argonauts, Edmonton Eskimos, Washington Redskins) (b. 1940)
  - Donald McClarren, 83, politician, member of the New Hampshire House of Representatives (b. 1938)
  - Matt Scherer, 38, track and field athlete (b. 1983)
  - Greg Tate, 64, music critic (The Village Voice) and musician (Burnt Sugar), co-founder of the Black Rock Coalition (b. 1957)
- December 8
  - Hal E. Broxmeyer, 77, microbiologist (b. 1944)
  - Gerry Foley, 89, American-Canadian ice hockey player (New York Rangers, Toronto Maple Leafs, Los Angeles Kings) (b. 1932)
  - Barry Harris, 91, jazz musician (b. 1929)
  - Blackjack Lanza, 86, Hall of Fame professional wrestler (WWE, AWA) (b. 1935)
  - Daniel Laskin, 97, surgeon and educator (b. 1924)
  - Richie Lewis, 55, baseball player (Florida Marlins, Detroit Tigers, Oakland Athletics) (b. 1966)
  - Mark Pike, 57, football player (Buffalo Bills) (b. 1963)
  - John L. Sorenson, 97, anthropologist, scholar and author (b. 1924)
  - Warren John Nutter, 84, murderer (b. 1937)
- December 9
  - Don Asmussen, 59, cartoonist (San Francisco Chronicle) (b. 1962)
  - Donald Cozzens, 82, Roman Catholic priest, author and lecturer (b. 1939)
  - Speedy Duncan, 79, football player (San Diego Chargers, Washington Redskins) (b. 1942)
  - Robert Jervis, 81, politologist (b. 1940)
  - David Lasley, 74, singer-songwriter (b. 1947)
  - Larry Sellers, 72, actor (Dr. Quinn, Medicine Woman) (b. 1949)
  - Demaryius Thomas, 33, football player (Denver Broncos, New York Jets, Houston Texans), Super Bowl champion (2016) (b. 1987)
  - Al Unser, 82, racing driver, four-time Indianapolis 500 winner, IndyCar champion (1983, 1985) (b. 1939)
  - Cara Williams, 96, actress (The Defiant Ones, Pete and Gladys, Boomerang) (b. 1925)
- December 10
  - Michael Nesmith, 78, musician (The Monkees) and songwriter ("Different Drum", "Joanne"), Grammy winner (1982) (b. 1942)
  - Gene Prebola, 83, football player (Oakland Raiders, Denver Broncos) (b. 1938)
  - Tyler E. Stovall, 67, historian, president of the American Historical Association (2017) (b. 1954)
  - Leland Wilkinson, 77, statistician and computer scientist (b. 1944)
- December 11 – Anne Rice, 80, author (The Vampire Chronicles, Lives of the Mayfair Witches) (b. 1941)
- December 12
  - Sid Blanks, 80, football player (Houston Oilers, Boston Patriots) (b. 1941)
  - Nai-Ni Chen, 62, Taiwanese-American choreographer and dancer (b. 1959)
  - James P. Dugan, 92, politician, member of the New Jersey Senate (1969–1977) (b. 1929)
  - Bernie Fowler, 97, politician, member of the Maryland Senate (1983–1994) (b. 1924)
  - Roland Hemond, 92, baseball executive (Chicago White Sox, Baltimore Orioles, Arizona Diamondbacks) (b. 1929)
  - Jimmy Rave, 39, professional wrestler (TNA, ROH) (b. 1982)
- December 13
  - Clyde Bennett, 89, football player (Ottawa Rough Riders) (b. 1932)
  - Blackberri, 76, singer-songwriter and community activist (b. 1945)
  - Lillian Luckey, 102, baseball player (South Bend Blue Sox) (b. 1919)
  - Charles R. Morris, 82, writer (Los Angeles Times, The Wall Street Journal) and banker (b. 1939)
  - Joe Simon, 85, soul and R&B singer ("The Chokin' Kind", "Get Down, Get Down (Get on the Floor)", "Power of Love") (b. 1936)
- December 14
  - Ken Kragen, 85, music manager and producer ("We Are the World"), founder of Hands Across America (b. 1936)
  - Henry Orenstein, 98, Polish-American Hall of Fame poker player and toymaker (b. 1923)
  - Tony Perez, 90, boxing referee (b. 1921)
  - Sonny Rhodes, 81, blues singer and guitarist (b. 1940)
- December 15
  - Bridget Hanley, 80, actress (Here Come the Brides, Harper Valley PTA) (b. 1941)
  - Len Hauss, 79, football player (Washington Redskins) (b. 1942)
  - bell hooks, 69, feminist author (Ain't I a Woman?, Feminist Theory: From Margin to Center, All About Love: New Visions) (b. 1952)
  - Marilee Stepan, 86, swimmer, Olympic bronze medalist (1952) (b. 1935)
  - Wanda Young, 78, singer (The Marvelettes) (b. 1943)
- December 16
  - Robert Cumming, 78, artist, sculptor and photographer (b. 1943)
  - George Gekas, 91, politician, member of the United States House of Representatives (1983–2003) (b. 1930)
  - Hub, 62, bass guitarist (The Roots) (b. 1959)
  - Baruch A. Levine, 91, Bible scholar (New York University) (b. 1930)
  - Edith Prague, 96, politician, member of the Connecticut House of Representatives (1982–1990) and Senate (1994–2012) (b. 1925)
  - Alan B. Scott, 89, ophthalmologist, developer of botulinum toxin (b. 1932)
  - Ben Tollefson, 94, politician, member of the North Dakota House of Representatives (1985–2000) and Senate (2000–2008) (b. 1927)
- December 17
  - Eve Babitz, 78, writer and visual artist (b. 1943)
  - Doug Ericksen, 52, politician, member of the Washington House of Representatives (1999–2011) and Senate (since 2011) (b. 1969)
  - Alexander Garvin, 80, urban planner (b. 1941)
  - Herb Guenther, 80, politician, member of the Arizona House of Representatives (1987–1993) and senate (1999–2003) (b. 1941)
  - Harry Jacobs, 84, football player (Boston Patriots, Buffalo Bills, New Orleans Saints) (b. 1937)
  - Frank Mula, 71, television writer and producer (The Simpsons, Cosby, Life with Bonnie), Emmy winner (2000, 2001) (b. 1950)
  - Burt Prelutsky, 81, television writer (M*A*S*H, Diagnosis: Murder, Dragnet) (b. 1940)
  - Russell Maroon Shoatz, 78, militant (Black Liberation Army) and convicted murderer (b. 1943)
- December 18
  - Drakeo the Ruler, 28, rapper (b. 1993)
  - Kangol Kid, 55, rapper and songwriter (UTFO) (b. 1966)
  - Hans Mark, 92, German-born American aerospace engineer, secretary of the Air Force (1979–1981) (b. 1929)
  - Joan Murray, 84, journalist (b. 1937)
- December 19
  - Ron Anderson, 75, vocal coach (Axl Rose, Chris Cornell, Ozzy Osbourne) (b. 1946)
  - Billy Conway, 65, drummer (Morphine, Treat Her Right) (b. 1955–1956)
  - Nicholas Georgiade, 88, actor (The Untouchables) (b. 1933)
  - Carie Graves, 68, rower, Olympic champion (1984) (b. 1953)
  - Robert H. Grubbs, 79, chemist (Grubbs catalyst), Nobel Prize laureate (2005) (b. 1942)
  - Johnny Isakson, 76, politician, member of the U.S. House of Representatives (1999–2005), Senate (2005–2019) and Georgia House of Representatives (1977–1991) (b. 1944)
  - Russ Potts, 82, politician, member of the Virginia Senate (1992–2008) (b. 1939)
  - Adam Rosen, 37, American-born British Olympic luger (2006, 2010, 2018) (b. 1984)
  - Robert Strichartz, 78, mathematician (b. 1943)
- December 20
  - Kimera Bartee, 49, baseball player (Detroit Tigers, Cincinnati Reds, Colorado Rockies) and coach (b. 1972)
  - Elizabeth Fennema, 93, educator (b. 1928)
  - Willard H. Murray Jr., 90, politician, member of the California State Assembly (1988–1996) (b. 1931)
- December 21
  - John Galbraith, 98, politician, member of the Ohio House of Representatives (1967–1986) (b. 1923)
  - Gary Lee Sampson, 62, spree killer (b. 1959)
  - George Sheltz, 75, Roman Catholic prelate, auxiliary bishop of Galveston-Houston (2012–2021) (b. 1946)
- December 22
  - Lester E. Fisher, 100, zoologist, director of Lincoln Park Zoo (1962–1992) (b. 1921)
  - George Keiser, 75, politician, member of the North Dakota House of Representatives (since 1992) (b. 1946)
  - Bob Keselowski, 70, stock car racing driver (NASCAR) (b. 1951)
  - Corporal Kirchner, 64, professional wrestler (WWF, NJPW, W*ING) (b. 1957)
  - Barbara Shaw, 79, politician, member of the New Hampshire House of Representatives (since 2010) (b. 1942)
  - Franklin A. Thomas, 87, community developer and philanthropist, president and CEO of the Ford Foundation (1979–1996) (b. 1934)
- December 23
  - Chris Dickerson, 82, bodybuilder, Mr. Olympia winner (1982) (b. 1939)
  - Joan Didion, 87, writer (Slouching Towards Bethlehem, Play It as It Lays, The Year of Magical Thinking) (b. 1934)
  - Robert Holland, 81, business executive, CEO of Ben & Jerry's (1995–1996) (b. 1940) (death announced on this date)
  - Grace Mirabella, 92, magazine editor, editor-in-chief of Vogue (1971–1988) and founder of Mirabella (b. 1929)
  - Stanley M. Truhlsen, 101, ophthalmologist (b. 1920)
  - Louie L. Wainwright, 98, corrections administrator (b. 1923)
- December 24
  - J. D. Crowe, 84, banjo player and bluegrass band leader (New South) (b. 1937)
  - Harvey Evans, 80, actor (West Side Story) (b. 1941)
  - Gwendolyn Killebrew, 82, operatic contralto (Deutsche Oper am Rhein) (b. 1939)
  - Clark Richert, 80, artist (b. 1941)
- December 25
  - Harry Colomby, 92, German-born American talent manager (Michael Keaton) and screenwriter (Johnny Dangerously, Working Stiffs) (b. 1929)
  - Bruce Davis, 65, football player (Oakland/Los Angeles Raiders, Houston Oilers) (b. 1956)
  - Tiffini Hale, 46, television presenter (The Mickey Mouse Club) and singer (The Party) (b. 1975)
  - Thomas Lovejoy, 80, ecologist (b. 1941)
  - Richard Marcinko, 81, Navy SEAL commander and one of its founders (b. 1940)
  - Jonathan Spence, 85, English-born American historian and sinologist (b. 1936)
  - Wayne Thiebaud, 101, painter (b. 1920)
  - Ralph Warburton, 97, Olympic ice hockey player (1948) (b. 1924)
- December 26
  - Gary B. Beikirch, 74, soldier, Medal of Honor recipient (b. 1947)
  - Fred McLafferty, 98, chemist (McLafferty rearrangement) (b. 1923)
  - Mameve Medwed, 79, novelist (b. 1942)
  - Sarah Weddington, 76, attorney (Roe v. Wade) and politician, member of the Texas House of Representatives (1973–1977) and White House Political Director (1979–1981) (b. 1945)
  - E. O. Wilson, 92, biologist (Sociobiology: The New Synthesis) and writer (On Human Nature, Consilience), Pulitzer Prize winner (1979, 1991) (b. 1929)
- December 27
  - Norman Freeman, 90, Olympic sailor (1976) (b. 1931)
  - Robert Preston, 92, politician, member of the New Hampshire Senate (1964–1966, 1972–1990) (b. 1929)
  - Andrew Vachss, 79, crime fiction author (Strega, Batman: The Ultimate Evil) and attorney (b. 1942)
  - Myrna Williams, 92, politician, member of the Nevada Assembly (1985–1993) and Clark County commissioner (1995–2007) (b. 1929)
- December 28
  - James Cayne, 87, businessman, CEO of Bear Stearns (b. 1934)
  - Michael R. Clifford, 69, astronaut (STS-53, STS-59, and STS-76) (b. 1952)
  - Mary Fairhurst, 64, lawyer, justice (2003–2020) and chief justice (2017–2020) of the Washington Supreme Court (b. 1957)
  - John Madden, 85, football coach (Oakland Raiders), Super Bowl champion (1977), sports commentator (Fox, CBS), and namesake of the Madden NFL video game series (b. 1936)
  - Harry Reid, 82, politician, Lieutenant Governor of Nevada (1971–1975), member of the U.S. House of Representatives (1983–1987), and Senate (1987–2017), Leader of the Senate Democratic Caucus (2005–2017), Senate Majority leader (2007–2015) (b. 1939)
- December 29
  - Sue Cline, 75, politician, member of the West Virginia Senate (2016–2020) (b. 1946) (death announced on this date)
  - John Hartman, 71, Hall of Fame drummer (The Doobie Brothers) (b. 1950)
  - William Moncrief, 101, oil and gas executive (b. 1920)
  - Nancy Worley, 70, politician, secretary of state of Alabama (2003–2007) (b. 1951)
- December 30
  - Sam Jones, 88, Hall of Fame basketball player (Boston Celtics) (b. 1933)
- December 31
  - Roger Bradfield, 97, children's author and illustrator (b. 1924)
  - Fred Cone, 95, football player (Green Bay Packers, Dallas Cowboys) (b. 1926)
  - Christine Grant, 85, Scottish-born American athletic director (University of Iowa) (b. 1936)
  - Stephen Hartgen, 77, politician and news editor (Times-News), member of the Idaho House of Representatives (2008–2018) (b. 1944)
  - Elihu Katz, 95, American-born Israeli sociologist and communication scientist (b. 1926)
  - Jeanine Ann Roose, 84, actress (It's a Wonderful Life) (b. 1937)
  - Billy Turner, 81, horse trainer (Seattle Slew), Triple Crown winner (1977) (b. 1940)
  - Betty White, 99, actress (The Golden Girls, The Mary Tyler Moore Show, Hot in Cleveland) and comedian, five-time Emmy winner (b. 1922)
